= Ștefan Foriș =

Romanian communist activist, journalist, and politician (1892–1946)

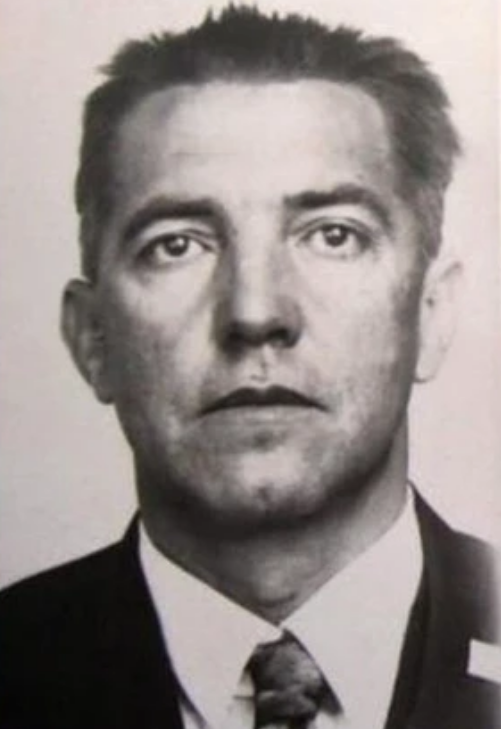
- Mug shot of Foriș in 1940

General Secretary of the Romanian Communist Party
- In office December 1940 – 4 April 1944
- Preceded by: Boris Stefanov (titular General Secretary); Béla Breiner (acting)
- Succeeded by: Emil Bodnăraș, Constantin Pîrvulescu, Iosif Rangheț (acting); Gheorghe Gheorghiu-Dej (titular General Secretary)

Personal details
- Born: István Fóris; 9 May 1892 Tatrang, Brassó County, Austria-Hungary
- Died: Summer 1946 (aged 54) Dorobanți, Bucharest, Kingdom of Romania
- Other political affiliations: Hungarian Communist Party (1918–1919); Socialist Party of Romania (1919–1921); Peasant Workers' Bloc (1926–1933)
- Spouse: Loti Csere
- Domestic partner(s): Tatiana Leapis; Victoria Sârbu
- Children: 1
- Education: Eötvös Loránd University
- Occupation: Journalist, accountant
- Nickname(s): Marius, Ungurul

Military service
- Allegiance: Austria-Hungary; Soviet Hungary
- Branch/service: Hungarian Landwehr; 32nd Artillery Regiment
- Years of service: 1914–1918; 1919
- Rank: Hadnagy
- Battles/wars: World War I Hungarian–Romanian War

Ștefan Foriș (Romanian pronunciation: [ˈʃteˈfan ˈforiʃ]; born István Fóris, also known as Marius; 9 May 1892 – summer 1946) was a Hungarian and Romanian communist journalist who served as general secretary of the Romanian Communist Party (PCR or PCdR) between December 1940 and April 1944. Born a Transylvanian Csángó and an Austro-Hungarian subject, he saw action with the Hungarian Landwehr throughout World War I. While training in mathematics at Eötvös Loránd University, he affiliated with the Galileo Circle and, moving to the far-left, entered the Hungarian Communist Party in late 1918. During the brief existence of a Hungarian Soviet Republic, he joined the war against Romania (1919), but subsequently opted to settle in the Romanian Kingdom, at Brașov. Foriș emerged as a local leader of the Socialist Party, largely failing at convincing his subordinates to join the PCR upon its creation (1921). He took up underground work even before the PCR was formally outlawed, while establishing his public profile as an accountant and a correspondent for moderate left-wing newspapers—including Adevărul and Facla.

From his new home in Bucharest, Foriș presided upon two PCR front organizations, including the Red Aid's local branch and the Peasant Workers' Bloc. He was caught up in the repression of the mid-to-late 1920s, but escaped to the Soviet Union before being sentenced. He was a Comintern cadre to 1929, choosing to return to Bucharest in 1928, after a general amnesty. Foriș was assigned as head of agitprop, and worked in parallel as a correspondent of TASS; he also took a direct part in power struggles, being instrumental in the 1928 overthrow of general secretary Elek Köblös. A member of the PCR Central Committee in 1930, he was himself neutralized by the Romanian authorities between 1931 and 1935, when he was jailed and, by his own account, repeatedly beaten. Upon reemerging, he became personally involved in forging the PCR's popular front strategy, though he failed in his main goal of forming a reciprocal alliance with the National Peasants' Party. Under the National Renaissance Front dictatorship (1938–1940), Foriș traced a controversial policy for the PCR, sparking his personal conflict with activist Lucrețiu Pătrășcanu.

Foriș emerged as PCR leader following the ouster of Boris Stefanov, and was recognized as such by the Comintern during another one of his Soviet travels. He presided upon a particularly inauspicious period in communist history, which saw dwindling support for the PCR; Foriș was also tasked with explaining the Molotov–Ribbentrop Pact, with its truce between the Comintern and fascism—locally represented by the Iron Guard. He was notorious for his failure to predict the invasion of the Soviet Union by Nazi Germany and Romania in mid 1941, thereafter finding his legitimacy openly challenged by Petre "Zidaru" Gheorghe and Teohari Georgescu; in the aftermath, he also refused to sponsor a partisan movement, and obstructed others from attempting to form one. Foriș's leadership style also relied on isolation and atomization of the existing party cells, a matter which contributed to his own demise. In 1943, he upset the powerful "prison faction" centered on Caransebeș penitentiary—its leaders, Gheorghe Gheorghiu-Dej and Emil Bodnăraș, conspired with Constantin Pîrvulescu to have Foriș deposed.

In April 1944, an unusually docile Foriș agreed to Bodnăraș's forceful demands, and resigned on the spot. He was kidnapped alongside his lover Victoria Sârbu, and then held hostage in PCR safe houses. Gheorghiu-Dej eventually took over as general secretary, and only tolerated Foriș as a contributor to the PCR's illegal press. After the anti-German coup of 23 August, which brought the PCR into government, the Foriș–Sârbu couple was repeatedly tormented, and made aware that their freedom was relative. Allegedly contemplating emigration into Hungary, Foriș was again kidnapped on orders from the new party elite, and bludgeoned to death by Gheorghe Pintilie. He was singled out as a traitor in party literature, though his fate remained undisclosed until April 1968, which was three years after Gheorghiu-Dej's own death. Foriș was only partly rehabilitated by Nicolae Ceaușescu as the new general secretary, with constant reference being made to his "grave mistakes"; as a sign of reconciliation, his remains were dug up and reburied in the Freedom Park necropolis.

== Biography ==
=== Early life ===
Foriș was born in Tatrang, Transylvania, Brassó County, part of Austria-Hungary (Transleithania) at the time—now Tărlungeni, Brașov County. As reported by historian Hilda Hencz, his ethnic origin was not only Hungarian, but also specifically Csángó, from a branch that had settled in Burzenland. Another historian, Cristina Diac, highlights Foriș's origins in the "Seven Villages" area, "whose inhabitants were often trilingual". Aside from his native Hungarian, Foriș was able to speak Romanian, German and French, talents which allowed him to work as a journalist. He lived at the same time as another Tatrang Csángó who shared both his first and last names, and who achieved posthumous recognition as a Hungarian folk poet—though he remains less known than his political namesake. Another coincidence brought Foriș the communist, and his family, into contact with the parents of Violeta Andrei, later famous as a film actress and as the wife of PCR potentate Ștefan Andrei.

Foriș's own parents, István Fóris Sr and Anna Kocsis, had a peasant background. In a 1940 autobiographical record, Foriș described his father as a woodcarver, bricklayer, and "small entrepreneur", whose one financial achievement was in setting up his own brickworks, always on the verge of bankruptcy. He claims to have supported himself from fourth grade, when he became a tutor to Saxon children. Such statements are partly contradicted by his grandson, architect Ștefan Sîrbu, who notes that Anna ended up owning several brickworks, allowing her son a comfortable existence. According to Diac, the family was successful enough to have been rated as "exploiters" under the communist guidelines. István Jr, who Romanianized his Christian name as "Ștefan", grew up to an impressive height of over 1.80 meters (approximately 6 feet); he was also "noticeably obese".

The future PCR leader completed his secondary studies in exact sciences at a lyceum in Brassó (today Brașov). On 1 August 1914, just shortly after the start of World War I, Foriș was drafted in the Hungarian Landwehr as an artillery cadet. According to his own reports, he saw action on the Italian front, and later in Albania. He served to November 1918, when he was demobilized as a Hadnagy (Lieutenant). He then resumed his education at the Eötvös Loránd University in Budapest, graduating from its Faculty of Physics and Mathematics in 1919. Marxist historian Florea Nedelcu argues that, in this context, Foriș also became "fully acquainted with the powerful revolutionary movement that was rocking the Austro-Hungarian empire, with the emancipation struggles of the popular masses, with national liberation movement of the oppressed peoples against the Habsburg monarchy." The young veteran had joined the Galileo Circle, which he called a "progressive organization". During the formation of a People's Republic, he was also drawn into the Hungarian Communist Party, which he formally joined in December 1918. His loyalties were split that same month, when the journal Szabad Gondolat ("Free Thought"), put out by the Galileo Circle, proceeded to mock communism. Foriș responded by writing a brochure defending his party, but in the end decided not to publish it. As he noted, the text was heavily influenced by anarchism, which he had come to see as embarrassing.

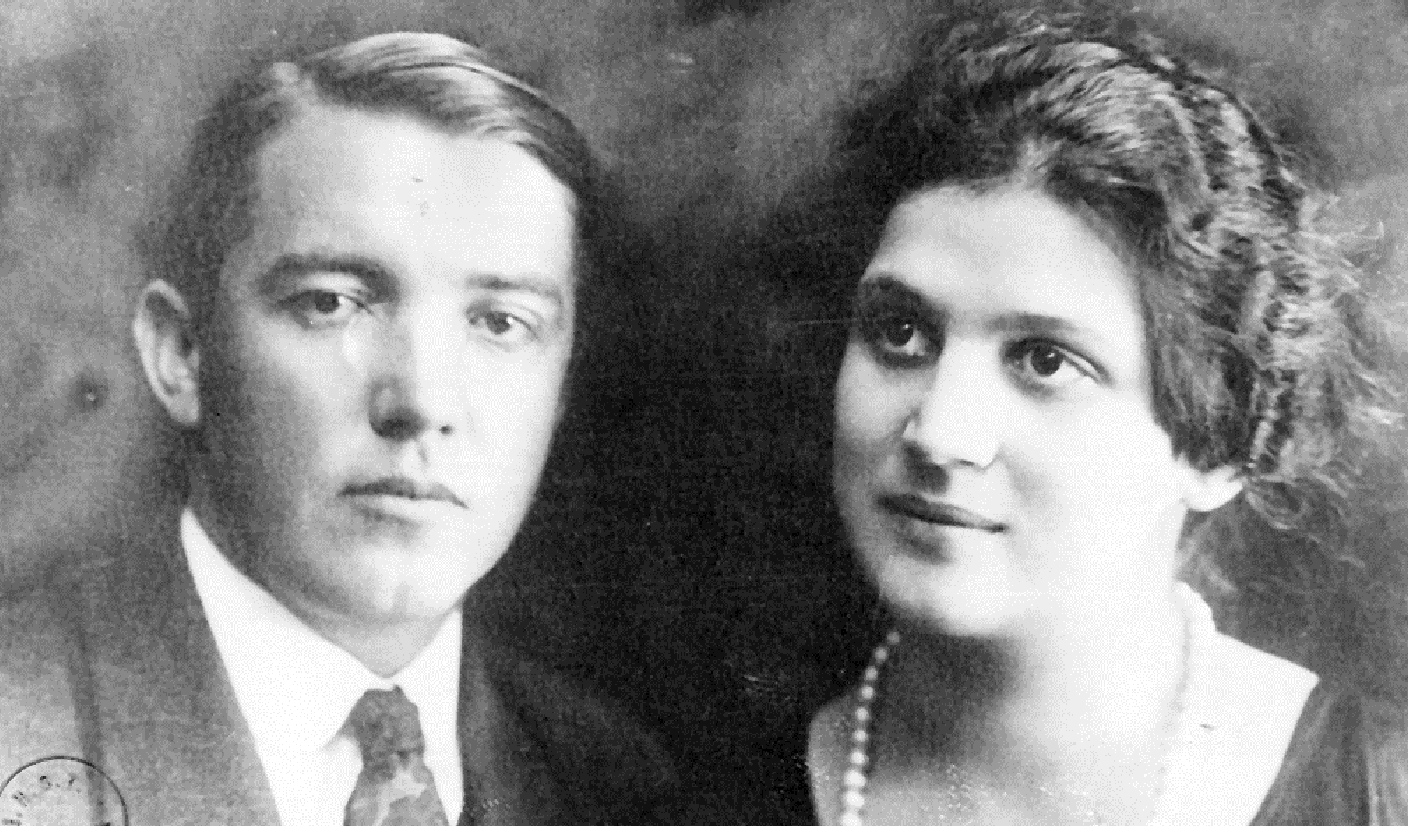
Ștefan and Loti Foriș

Foriș was part of the movement to establish the Hungarian Soviet Republic in March 1919. The following month, he volunteered for the communist army's 32nd Artillery Regiment, seeing action in the Hungarian–Romanian War. After Budapest fell to the Romanians, Foriș settled within the Kingdom of Romania (which had since also been united with Transylvania), entered the local Socialist Party (PS) in October 1919, and affirmed himself as a contributor to left-wing publications, beginning with Világosság ("The Light"). He and Eugen Rozvan were co-editors for Dezső Jász's newspaper, Előre ("Forward"), which was published from 1921 to 1923, when it was banned. He was for a while married to a fellow communist, Loti (also known as Lotty or Loți) Csere, who would later share his fate as a political prisoner of the interwar.

Foriș rallied with the PCR (or PCdR) upon its creation in May 1921—with Iosif István and Zoltán Hortesz, he set up the committee steering Brașov's PS cell toward communist affiliation. As he noted in 1940, the effort was undermined by "centrists", who managed to prevent most PS members from joining them, but was acknowledged by Elek Köblös and Aladar Berger of the PCR, who made Foriș their connection for the entire Transylvania. With much of the PCR leadership rounded up in the Dealul Spirii Trial, Foriș reported being overwhelmed by his tasks. In June 1922, after several weeks of insomnia, he attended a trade unions' congress at Sibiu, and collapsed in front of his colleagues. They had him interned at the local psychiatric hospital. Though he "got to my senses after some 5 days", he found that his workload had been much reduced. As the core staff of Világosság, he and Rozvan developed an antipathy for Köblös, who appointed a "centrist" favorite, Sándor Asztalos, as editor-in-chief. According to Foriș, such behavior pinpointed Köblös as a "right-wing" communist. This variant of events is contradicted by historian Liviu Pleșa, who notes that Foriș and Vasile Luca (whom Foriș had employed at Előre) were part of a "Magyar camp" which helped Köblös take over as PCR general secretary in 1924.

=== PCR outlawing ===
The authorities had Világosság banned in late 1922, though Foriș and Rozvan made some efforts to revive it under different names. Foriș found his next employment as a Transylvanian correspondent for Adevărul and Dimineața dailies, which were left-wing but non-communist. He eventually moved to Bucharest, the Romanian capital, in 1923, working as a junior accountant for a real estate magnate, Mihail Askenasy; he was also an editor for Munkás ("The Worker"), the PCR's Hungarian-language newspaper, alongside Dezideriu Lichtenstein. In April 1924, the authorities moved to outlaw the PCR, shutting down its newspapers. As Foriș recounts, Lichtenstein was expelled from Romania, while he himself was "invited" by the Romanian secret police, or Siguranța Statului, to an interrogation. He decided not to show up, and became a wanted person, some eight months before Romania actually criminalized PCR membership. In June, he was reassured by the PCR general secretary, Gheorghe Cristescu, that it was safe for him to return from hiding. He was nonetheless arrested, and subjected to interrogation as to "who had contributed the last issue of Munkás". Foriș declined to answer and opted to go on hunger strike, being ultimately set free by a military prosecutor a week into his protest.

Foriș returned from jail as an accountant for another firm, Metalica, and signed up for trade union representing the interests of petty clerks, but quit his job for another editorial office, at N. D. Cocea's Facla. He was co-opted by the PCR's front organizations, joining the executive board of the Red Aid section, where, in 1925, he took over the office of secretary from Gheorghe Vasilescu-Vasia. He established a strike action committee for the Unified Trade Unions, and also created a League Against Terror, placing the latter under Dem I. Dobrescu. After the Tatarbunary Uprising and its quashing, Foriș and his Red Aid section worked to elicit an international reaction against the rebels' prosecution. Foriș acknowledged that the move failed when the local Red Aid, advised by Mihail Cruceanu, attempted to bribe the judges. The resulting scandal prompted the Red Aid's international bureau to cut off funding for Romania. He was himself re-arrested in October 1925, but released when the Red Aid and Cocea intervened in his favor.

Foriș was subsequently appointed to the Central Committee of the Peasant Workers' Bloc. He was then caught up in the clampdown which began with Boris Stefanov's arrest in 1926, but, faced with a negligent prosecutor, was able to slip out of custody, and was promoted on the Central Committee secretariat during a clandestine meeting (November 1926). Arrests continued, and each new one carried the risk of a denunciation. Foriș was exposed in April 1927, following confessions made by Petre Imbri and Haia Lifșiț, upon which he was detained in Oradea. Indicted in a trial held in Cluj, he claimed to have been bastinadoed as a means to obtain his own confession. Foriș began another hunger strike and, after 27 days, was released in the care of his family pending trial. He himself counted three more arrests for 1927–1928, including one which resulted in a 20-days stay at Jilava Prison.

As he himself reported, he made an illegal crossing into the Soviet Union, during May–June 1928, attending the 4th PCR Congress, which was held in the Ukrainian SSR. It resulted in Köblös's removal from his executive position; Foriș was reportedly offered a seat on the Central Committee, but refused the honor as too premature. Köblös's downfall was partly his own contribution, made possible when he attracted Luca into the opposition. He returned to Bucharest briefly, and was again on Soviet territory in September, when his Red Aid colleagues had him sent on a health vacation to Yalta. He then served as the exile cadre of the PCR and its representative to the Comintern (1928–1930). Foriș lived for a while in Kharkov, then Moscow, and eventually Berlin. He was tried in absentia by the Cluj tribunal, and sentenced to ten years imprisonment and to a 50,000 lei fine.

The Romanian elections of December 1928 brought into power Iuliu Maniu, who decreed a general amnesty. Foriș caught news of this, and asked the Comintern to send him back to Romania. He could only return to Bucharest in January 1930, when he was also co-opted by the Central Committee. Subsequently, Foriș served as Transylvanian secretary, and was selected head of the nationwide agitprop section. He claimed to have personally edited for print the first issue of a core PCR newspaper, Scînteia (August 1931). The Soviet news agency, TASS, employed him and Loti as correspondents. He was taking part in the conflict opposing Marcel Pauker to Vitali "Barbu" Holostenco, as a conditional supporter of the latter, and expressing regret that the PCR was succumbing to "fractionism". In 1931, Nicolae Iorga and his Democratic Nationalists formed a new Romanian cabinet, which revised Maniu's liberal stances. Interpreting Iorga though the Comintern's grid, Foriș became convinced that the country was a "military fascist dictatorship". He later expressed regret over this misreading, which had caused "confusion in the party."

Foriș lived most of the rest of his life in hiding from the authorities; he was again apprehended in August 1931, while preparing for a Soviet vacation. According to Foriș, he may have been unintentionally exposed by Loti, who was followed on her way to meet her TASS supervisor. They appeared together before a new trial, this time in front of the Ilfov County tribunal; Ștefan was represented by lawyers Paul Moscovici and Petre Zisu, while Loti's defense was handled by Iosif Șraier. They argued that, while admittedly communist, the Forișes had not published illegal manifestos, and also that their work for TASS was not illegal. The presiding judge sentenced Ștefan to a five-year jail term and a 10,000-lei fine; Loti was given a two-year sentence. In October 1932, she allegedly "provided a number of very important confessions that are still being kept secret."

Moved between Văcărești and Doftana prisons in 1931–1934, Ștefan Foriș was released in 1935, two years before the end of his sentence. He had been allowed to network and teach "party history" in the former, but, once he arrived at Doftana in July 1933, was censored and incapacitated with beatings. One late 1933 report suggests that he was "so disfigured that his own wife was unable to recognize him as her husband. Foriș, who was physically one of the strongest of our imprisoned comrades, was taken to the visiting room on a stretcher". While in jail, he took credit for exposing Richard Wurmbrand as a "Trotskyist" and Siguranța provocateur. Also during that interval, Loti separated from Foriș, and became Șraier's paramour; Foriș took as his lover the fellow communist Tatiana Leapis (later married Bulan). By some accounts, he was also romantically involved with Melita Scharf, who was later in a relationship with Iosif Chișinevschi—before marrying Gheorghe Apostol.

=== "Popular front" tactic ===
Foriș's political adversaries report that he had signed an affidavit which reneged his communism. As one of them, Apostol acknowledges that Foriș's "treason" came after he had been subjected to a "regimen of physical and moral destruction". This had been ordered by Doftana's warden, Eugen Săvinescu-Balaurul, who then used Foriș's capitulation as evidence that the regimen worked. The claim was partly validated by Foriș's autobiographical note, which featured his obligatory self-criticism: "I submit[ted] to the regulations and would not engage in communist propaganda while jailed at Doftana." As he put it at the time, this had been an "enormous mistake", for which he shared the blame with inmates such as Béla Breiner and Gheorghe Gheorghiu-Dej. The original verdict of ten years was eventually annulled by the Romanian authorities. By late 1935, Foriș had returned to his work in the PCR, and, alongside Dori Goldstein, was seeking to forge an alliance with the Social Democratic Party (PSDR). In April 1936, he covered the PSDR congress for Atlas newspaper, commending the Social Democratic left for having settled the platform around several communist-inspired goals: "against fascism and the looming war, for a mutual assistance treat with the Soviet Union, for the union of all democratic and proletarian forces".

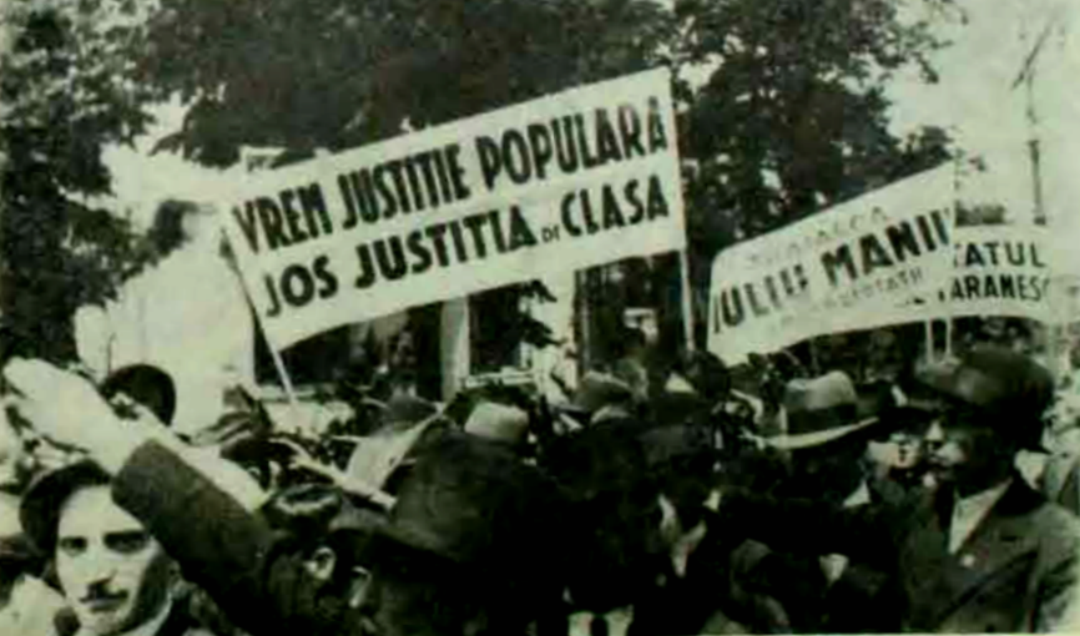
Communists from the various Sectors of Bucharest, attending a National Peasants' Party rally (31 May 1936). On the left, the communist slogan: Vrem justiție populară / Jos justiția de clasă ("We demand popular justice / down with class justice"); on the right, National Peasantist signs celebrating Iuliu Maniu and the "Peasant State"

Foriș was also networking with social scientist and lawyer Lucrețiu Pătrășcanu, who was organizing defense in the celebrity trials of Ana Pauker (known as the "Craiova Trial") and Petre Constantinescu-Iași. Foriș and Luca appeared as defense witnesses for the former, testifying that the Unified Trade Unions, though revolutionary in nature, were not a PCR front. As reported by Pătrășcanu's wife Elena, their trial-organizing activities were largely futile, reduced to "endless gatherings [...] at a coffee shop." During these meetings, Pătrășcanu vented his frustration at the PCR alliance policy, which was trying to create a popular front with Maniu's National Peasants' Party (PNȚ). The alliance was in any case rejected on behalf of the PNȚ by Ion Mihalache, when he finally agreed to meet with Foriș in June 1936. The Spanish Civil War, which erupted later that year, saw Foriș engaged in the recruitment effort for the International Brigades. He was responsible for the one documented case of a Romanian not being allowed to join, when he declared that volunteer Ion Clonțan, expelled from the PCR in the early 1930s, was a "Trotskyist".

A Bucharest Police report from July 1936 noted that Pătrășcanu, Foriș, and Moscu Kohn had been dismissed from the Central Committee for their failure to prevent Ana Pauker's capture—this resulted in Foriș's reasigment to the agitprop section. The Detective Corps, meanwhile, identified Foriș and Sorin Toma as the men behind "all legal publications put out by the communist party", including Era Nouă ("New Era"), nominally published by Cocea. This claim was validated decades later by Era Nouă contributor Gogu Rădulescu, who describes Foriș as the magazine's "initiator". In late 1936, Foriș was the PCR delegate to the International Peace Conference in Brussels, and, on his way home, took short breaks in the spa towns of Austria and Czechoslovakia. Upon his return, he formed the PCR's secretariat for legal work, on which he co-opted Pătrășcanu, Goldstein, and Ilie Pintilie. From May 1937, Breiner reduced this section to a two-man body, comprising Foriș and Pintilie.

Foriș and his subordinates, including Toma, Leonte Răutu and Ștefan Voicu, expelled from the party a young writer, Alexandru Sahia; in August, following Sahia's death from disease, Foriș ordered his posthumous recovery, which, in 1938, included a pilgrimage to his grave. Around that time, Foriș was in permanent contact with the young communist Silviu Brucan, who had infiltrated the PNȚ press and was given free hand to run the weekly Dacia Nouă. As Brucan reports: "Although the party platform dictated collaboration with the democratic parties, Foriș could not wrap his head around how I could work so well with the Liberals and the Peasantists". Together, Foriș and Pintilie were responsible for tying the PCR to the PNȚ ahead of the December 1937 elections, which, as Foriș acknowledged, proved to be a debacle—once the National Peasantists had signed a non-aggression pact with the fascist Iron Guard.

On 8 January 1938, Scînteia lamented the party's "fundamental defect", namely its inability to coalesce a "front of all democratic organizations and parties [against] the openly fascist and governmental lists." During the next few weeks, Breiner was in the Soviet Union and Pintilie was being isolated as a potential Siguranța asset, leaving Foriș as the one-person secretariat. In the meantime, Foriș embraced a tactic of reaching out to more moderate leftist groups. He was again in contact with Cocea, and through the PCR connection Mircea Bălănescu, sponsored Cocea's string of "legal/semi-legal gazettes". This partnership took form even as Cocea was building a personal rapport with the Siguranța's Director, Mihail Moruzov. A later dossier compiled on Cocea by the Siguranța places Foriș among the staff writers for Cocea's Reporter magazine, alongside Pătrășcanu, Emil Husar, Dolfi Trost, and Ilie Zaharia. Reporter was banned by a new government, formed around Octavian Goga and his National Christian Party. A similar list of its collaborators appeared in Goga's magazine Țara Noastră, which exposed Reporter as a "communist mouthpiece [...] with only communists as authors."

By February 1938, the Romanian Kingdom had slid into authoritarianism and corporate statism, replacing all parties with the National Renaissance Front (FRN). Nedelcu writes that, by then, Foriș was fully committed to the anti-fascist platform embraced by the PCR, which defined a "defensive war against fascist imperialism" as being in Romania's best interest. In order to understand more about Romanian society and economic trends, he broke party protocol and asked a covert communist, Voicu, to write an expose on such topics. Against Pătrășcanu, Ion Mețiu, and others, Foriș also supported a policy of infiltrating FRN structures, in particular its workers' guilds. Allegedly, this quarrel prompted Pătrășcanu to effectively cut himself off from the PCR until 1944. In that context, Pătrășcanu also noted that Foriș had done very little to prevent the Romanian working class from falling under the Iron Guard's spell—a special session of the Central Committee reprimanded him and issued a rebuttal.

The arrest of another communist, Elena Balog, resulted in the neutralization of PCR movement in Oltenia, which was headed by Ion Popescu-Puțuri. The Siguranța was also informed of Foriș's new role and whereabouts, arresting him on 18 November 1938. The roundup ran parallel to a violent settling of scores between the FRN and the Iron Guard. In the end, the communist detainees were released, since, as Foriș argues, there was nothing to corroborate Balog's statements. Unbeknown to Foriș, there was a relaxation of measures against the PCR, which had been ordered by the FRN's Interior Minister, Armand Călinescu. A Police officer, Sterian C. Constantin, confirmed in 1963 that, in 1939–1940, he was under orders to stop his surveillance of Foriș's group and allocate more resources to encroaching on the Iron Guard. During early 1939, Foriș still drew attention from the Siguranța over his contacts with Zaharia Stancu and Lumea Românească circle.

=== Taking over ===
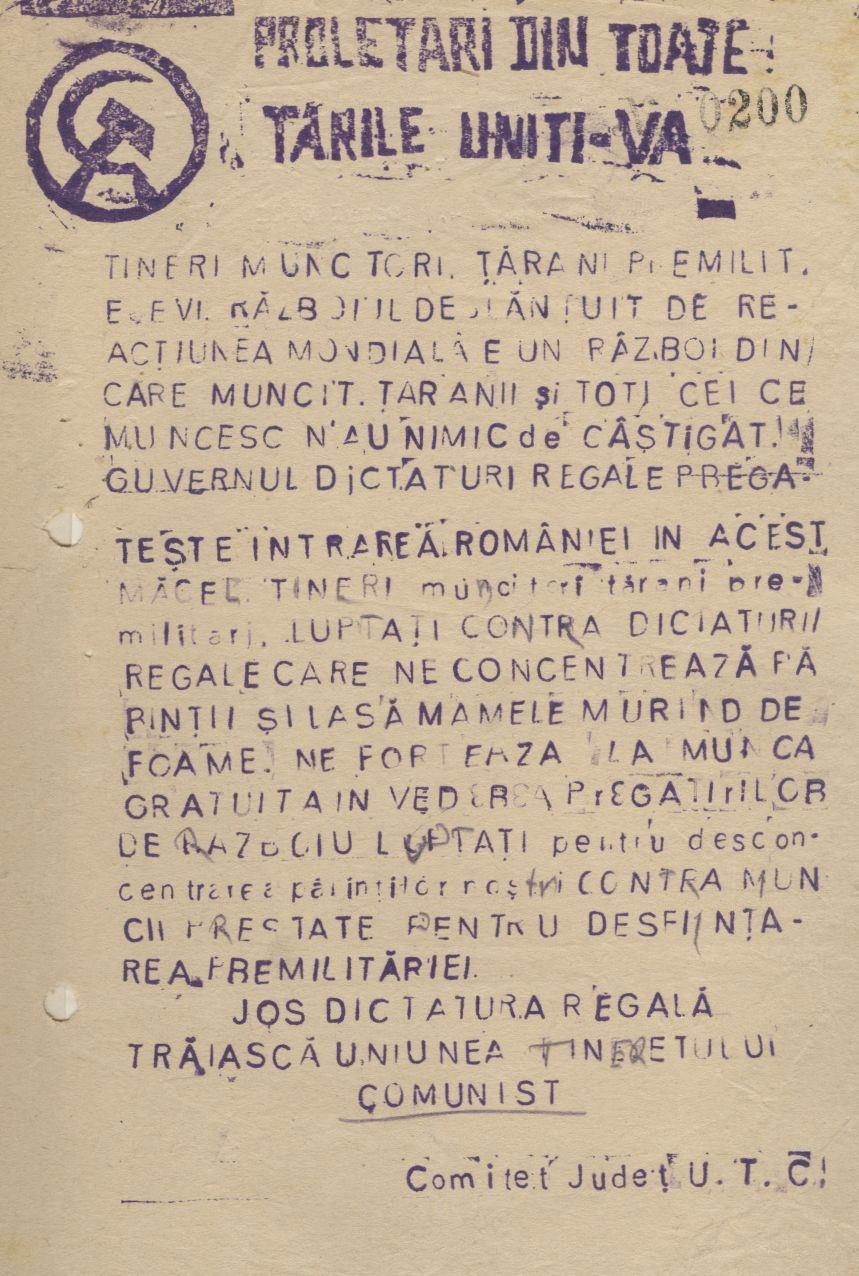
Union of Communist Youth manifesto against the National Renaissance Front and for "avoiding war", put out in Bessarabia in 1940

During October 1939 (that is, a month after the start of World War II, and some weeks after Călinescu's assassination by the Guard), Foriș secretly directed Cocea and Gheorghe Vlădescu-Răcoasa toward creating a new pro-communist weekly, Observatorul ("The Observer"). Though his two friends obtained permission from the Ministry of Propaganda, cascading events prevented the newspaper from ever being launched. In early 1940, Stefanov lost his position as PCR general secretary. Breiner was assigned as his temporary replacement, but died in March, leaving Foriș as the unofficial PCR leader. He resumed his investigation into the spread of "Trotskyism", a charge that was being posthumously leveled against Marcel Pauker. Foriș visited his widow, Ana, in her cell prison at Râmnicu Sărat, where he tried to obtain clear evidence that she repudiated Marcel's politics. In a negative referral addressed to the Comintern, he recorded that she was being slyly evasive on the topic.

Faced with such complications and made aware that the PCR was failing to attract the Romanian workers, the Comintern asked for two high-level activists to be sent as party representatives in Moscow; as the first picks, Luca and Ștrul Zighelboim attempted to make their way across the Soviet–Romanian border in Bukovina. They were apprehended by the Romanian Border Police and jailed at Cernăuți. These events prompted Foriș and Teohari Georgescu to take over the mission, by crossing into Soviet territory during May. This was just ahead of a Soviet ultimatum that resulted in Romania's cession of Bessarabia and northern Bukovina. From 22 May the interim leadership of the PCR most likely went to another duo, formed by Chișinevschi and Gavril Birtaș. According to Apostol, it was still Foriș who dictated the party line, especially by advising all PCR men who wished to serve the cause to simply emigrate into the Soviet Union—resulting in another mass desertion from party ranks.

Having secured support from the Comintern, Foriș was appointed general secretary in lieu of the ousted Stefanov. Its approval came despite negative referrals from Georgescu and Kohn. The former saw Foriș as irritable and negligent, while the latter described Foriș's decision-making process as "sluggish". This verdict is also backed by Sorin Toma, who first met Foriș in the home of his father, the poet Alexandru Toma. He recalls that the agitprop leader was unbearably silent and stressed out, and would only address his peers after first smoking a cigarette or two. At the time a PCR cadre, Grigore Răceanu sees Foriș as "intelligent just as he was sly", but also prone to "aggressive behavior" whenever he was contradicted. Rădulescu found him to be "always serious, a man of few words." Foriș merely "seemed sluggish", but was in fact a "true intellectual, with a deep and thorough manner of thinking, and soul-wise a sensitive man, with his warm amiable smile as a window into his soul."

A 1949 report by communist sympathizer Gheorghe Micle has it that, while abroad in July 1940, Foriș transmitted a Soviet offer for a military protectorate over Romania. As Micle puts it, Birtaș and Iosif Rangheț backed the effort, which required Micle to contact the PNȚ for a "National Unity" government (and a platform of "national anti-fascist resistance"). The offer was rejected by Maniu, who noted that the Soviet Union was itself "imperialistic", with the Bessarabian ultimatum being proof of this; his own priority was in "reunifying the Nation". According to Răceanu, Foriș himself approved of the Bessarabian Soviet annexation, seeing it as a fulfillment of Comintern directives; Răceanu, who documented in writing his own opposition to this policy, was expelled from the party on the basis of his statement.

On 31 December 1940, Foriș reached Romania by sailing clandestinely from southern Bessarabia (incorporated by the Ukrainian SSR) and into Tulcea. This part of the operation was overseen by Dumitru Coliu, using connections in the Lipovan fishing community. On his passage through Northern Dobruja, Foriș was reportedly met by a female comrade, Victoria Sârbu, who became his friend. His transport to Bucharest was organized by Birtaș and Agneta Runcan, who then hid him in the Runcan home on Bouleanu Street, and later at Oscar Redlingher's villa in Dorobanți. He lived largely in seclusion, only stepping out of the house at night, generally using Birtaș and Romeo Runcan as his connections to the outside. He also relied on Remus Koffler for collecting funds from regular members, as well as "from well-off intellectuals, entrepreneurial engineers, high-ranking functionaries"; examples of major sponsors include Emil Calmanovici, who also did bookkeeping for the party.

Foriș was confirmed with a perfunctory ceremony which simply acknowledged Comintern directives. During these events, Romania's FRN had crumbled, giving way to an Iron Guard government, called "National Legionary State", which proclaimed its alignment with Nazi Germany and the other Axis powers. By then, the Axis alliance no longer conflicted with the communist agenda: Foriș had to maneuver his party in the wake of the Molotov–Ribbentrop Pact, which had enshrined a two-year armistice between Moscow and Berlin. He immediately circulated his critique of Stefanov's mandate, accusing him of lassitude and "sectarian" tendencies. As Foriș noted, Stefanov had not kept up with the course of German–Soviet relations, and was still publishing anti-Nazi manifestos that "would have been fine before the pact between the Soviet Union and Germany". The National Legionary regime began by cultivating friendly relations with the PCR: though it did not liberate cadres from their imprisonment, the Iron Guard politely greeted them and engaged them in polite discussions. Some party cells viewed the situation as intolerable. In November, during Foriș's absence, Petre "Zidaru" Gheorghe had rallied PCR cadres in the Bucharest neighborhood of Obor, for a public demonstration against Germans and Guardists alike. This resulted in another clampdown and loss of personnel, which reportedly angered the new general secretary.

Shortly after Foriș's return, a brief civil war incapacitated and deposed the Iron Guard, leaving Romania to be governed by General Ion Antonescu. Under Antonescu's watch, the country consolidated its alliance with Germany (see Romania during World War II); during his first meetings with PCR cadres, Foriș remained reassuring that there would be no German–Soviet war, though he also informed them: "in case there is a war, communists must present themselves for active duty with their respective military units", so as to bring propaganda efforts on the front line. Repression of the PCR, meanwhile, reached its most severe phase. The clampdown became manifest in April 1941, when the Siguranța managed to capture almost all of the PCR leadership, including Foriș's closest collaborators—party eminences Chișinevschi and Teohari Georgescu. The circumstances of this "spectacular arrest" are obscure, but there is indication that Foriș himself credited Siguranța informants for its success; when promoting a young man, Constantin Carp, to fill in a leadership position, he expressed his amazement that Carp had not been arrested—thus hinting that he considered all comrades suspect. A contributing factor to Siguranța's success was Birtaș's failure to uphold secrecy. Informed of this, Foriș had Birtaș and his wife stripped of their party membership.

=== Resisting the resistance ===
The PCR was thus successfully neutralized by Antonescu ahead of the German–Romanian attack on the Soviet Union, which took place in June 1941. "Zidaru" claimed that, just weeks ahead of the invasion, Foriș still vouched for the German–Soviet entente. The course of events pushed him to adopt a reserve plan. According to a hostile report by PCR activist Ștefan Pavel, Foriș now suggested that communists should still not resist recruitment into the Romanian Army: "he'd tell everyone: go into the army and, once there, defect to the Soviet side; as if the Soviets would be waiting for us with open arms!" From November 1941, Nicolae Petrea, Mihai Levente and Ion Vincze were tasked by the PCR with hampering the war effort in Transnistria, where they sold or donated food parcels stolen from the National Institute of Statistics.

Interested in organizing a more committed and armed resistance, "Zidaru" took initiative in publishing his own manifesto, addressed to his subordinates in Ilfov County. Foriș criticized the text for its reference to Bessarabians as "our Romanian brethren", rather than as "Moldovans", but also for the claim that Romania and Finland were witting accomplices in Germany's actions. In private conversations, Foriș depicted "Zidaru" as a fascist. This dispute inaugurated another period of tensions and "factionalism", with Petre Gheorghe emerging as a powerful rival by December 1941. Foriș reacted by sending Constantin Pîrvulescu to dismiss Ilfov's entire PCR executive committee, which refused to abide by that order until January 1942, when Foriș protege Petrea managed to replace "Zidaru".

During those months, the communist prisoners, mostly held at Caransebeș, awaited more directives from the general secretary. Finally, in October 1941, Gheorghiu-Dej wrote Foriș on their behalf, expressing his willingness to follow central commands. In the meantime, Foriș had ordered Chișinevschi and Georgescu to be investigated by a special party commission. Both were immediately cleared, but Foriș remained unconvinced. He procrastinated until April 1942, when he finally wrote to Caransebeș that he considered the two comrades to have been compromised; Georgescu defended himself by spreading rumors that Foriș himself was a traitor. As a member of the Caransebeș in-crowd, Apostol credited these rumors to his death:

Foriș was the one who turned over the Central Committee secretariat to the Siguranța. [...] Foriș had convened a party session at a safe house, its address only known to him. This was where Chișinevschi, Teohari Georgescu and Birtaș arrived [...], each on his own and at separate intervals. [...] The deal was that Foriș would be the last to arrive. What arrived instead was a group of Siguranța agents. They arrested everyone there.

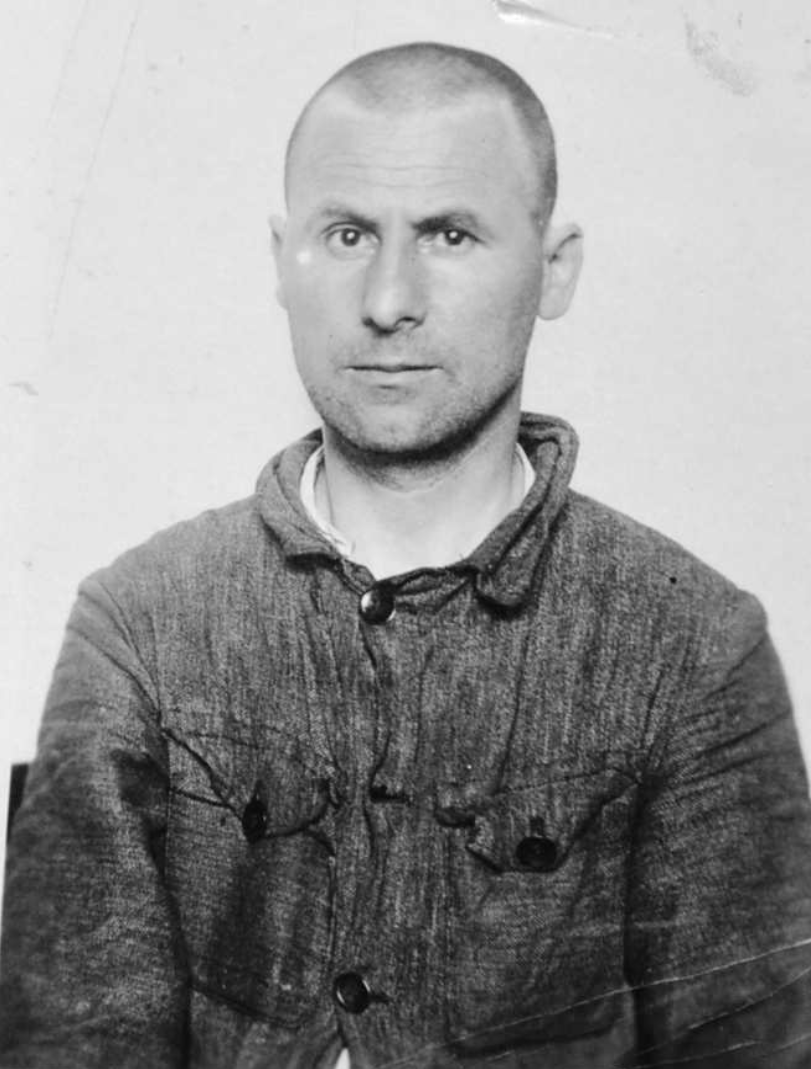
Mug shot of Petre "Zidaru" Gheorghe upon his arrest in April 1942

Political scientist and eyewitness Pavel Câmpeanu notes that Foriș was personally responsible for another debacle, also taking place in April 1942—namely, the Siguranța raid on the Union of Communist Youth, which disassembled Ilfov's organizational network, resulting in the arrest of activists Justin Georgescu (who died in custody) and "Zidaru" (who was executed later on). The raid disturbed other communists, who suspected that the party central had been compromised by informants; Foriș denied their claims by issuing his own conspiracy theory, which nominated his accusers, including Petre Gheorghe's Jewish wife, as "Hitlerite" provocateurs. In reality, the network had been exposed through a long-term sting operation by the German Security Office, which followed Gheorghe's contacts with the Bulgarian underground. According to various testimonies, "Zidaru" still regarded Foriș (or Ungurul, "The Hungarian") as a figure of ultimate authority, and dedicated his last thoughts to regretting their earlier conflict. Gheorghe's sister, Ivanka Sarisky, did not share in his sentiment, writing to her comrades that Foriș needed to be "purged".

By 1943, almost all the leadership of the party was either living in exile in the Soviet Union (forming the "Muscovite faction" of the party) or in prison either in Romania-proper or in Romanian-run labor camps in Transnistria (as the "prison faction"). Only three members of the communist leadership—Foriș, Pătrășcanu, and Koffler—were free, remaining active clandestinely, and constituting the "secretariat faction". Foriș, Koffler, and Victoria Sârbu, who was now both his secretary and lover, oversaw the small group from a secret location in Bucharest. One success registered by the PCR in late 1943 and early 1944 was in attracting funds from the Jewish industrialist Max Auschnitt. Reportedly, Foriș also sold off his mother's brickworks, setting aside funds for a bombing campaign that would have sabotaged Romania's war industry—the bombs were never assembled. In his attempt to organize such actions, Foriș relied on Petre Melinte, who, unbeknown to him, was a Siguranța man, responsible for turning in another saboteur, Francisc Panet.

According to Răceanu, Foriș appeared impatient about forming a Romanian guerilla force, confident that the PCR could still count on popular support. When asked by Răceanu to form such units from the secretariat faction, Foriș reputedly lost his cool, arguing that such an initiative would end in the PCR's physical extermination. Other accounts also note that the general secretary was skeptical and inconsistent when it came to organizing both the bombing campaigns and any actual partisan units. This matter perplexed his comrade, Carp, who once asked Foriș to take notes from the Bulgarian and Yugoslav resistance movements. Foriș reportedly answered:

where would we even begin, can't you see we have no means at our disposal, that we are not in the same position as Yugoslavia and Bulgaria, with their tradition of fighting, that the Germans came [over to Romania] as allies.

Carp's account is supported by Petrea. He reports that, in 1943, Foriș ordered his subordinates not to respond when a group of youths wanted to donate home-made bombs, which they hoped the communists would use against the Wehrmacht. Also according to Petrea, the "military commission" set up by Rangheț and Emil Bodnăraș in November 1941 had produced only "abstract" plans by September 1943, and was mostly concerned with organizing a communist takeover. As Petrea notes, Foriș and Sârbu were involved in analyzing its work, and insisted on noting its major flaws, including Bodnăraș's disregard for the PCR leadership and "other resistance groups created by the opposition [to Antonescu]." In the end, they decided to blame Rangheț for the debacle, assigning it to Bodnăraș, who took Pîrvulescu as his assistant. In 1943, Foriș was looking forward to the prospect of an Allied landing in the Balkans, as an exterior prop in the movement to topple Antonescu. Though he owned a two-way radio, specifically provided to him as a means to contact Moscow, Foriș never used it, allegedly prompting Georgi Dimitrov, of the Comintern's Research Institute 205, to angrily point out that "he had no idea what was going on there [in Romania]". Instead, in late 1942 Foriș and Pătrășcanu met again in Lena Constante's home. Here, they wrote a memo for the Secret Intelligence Service, reporting on PCR units that could serve in the event of a British landing.

=== Caransebeș conspiracy ===
Apostol notes that his fellow inmates were planning to break out of Caransebeș in spring 1943, and had secured support from a prosecutor. The plan was reportedly obstructed by Foriș, who wanted the PCR to take full credit for any such attempt. In this context, Foriș (or "Marius") became an obstacle to the rise of the "prison faction", who now acknowledged Gheorghiu-Dej as its leader. Foriș was also increasingly critical of his subordinates' behavior and ideology, which probably contributed to his isolation inside the party he led. Câmpeanu reports that Foriș's personal habits also eroded his legitimacy:

The [Redlingher villa] on Iuliu Tetrat Street served two purposes: one was as a refuge, protecting him either from arrest or from being tailed by the Siguranța; the other was as a command center. The first of these two was only an instrument to help in fulfilling the latter. Foriș's peculiarities inverted the relationship between the two functions. With his endless loitering in his upstairs room [...], he unquestionably drifted away from the lively ambiance of the city and of the country at large, but also of the party, the same party which he was otherwise bent on leading. Slowly but surely, he was becoming the imaginary leader of a party that, as it turns out, mostly existed in his own imagination.

In addition to losing party cadres in mass arrests, Foriș was purposefully alienating PCR veterans, removing them from positions of importance and pushing instead figures such as Carp and Petrea, both of whom were in their twenties, and the 30-years-old Nicu Tudor (who was a Siguranța informant). In October 1943, he put out a letter for the Caransebeș group, in which he criticized their autonomous enforcement of inner-party policies. Câmpeanu sees this Foriș's claims as a singular chronicle of Gheorghiu-Dej stances during that stage of war. They document Gheorghiu-Dej's move to exclude 100 members from the Caransebeș party cell, his offer to contribute prison labor for Caransebeș Airport, as well as his and his comrades' interest in joining the anti-Soviet effort on the Eastern Front. Foriș also reported that his rivals in Caransebeș had supported a prison administrator, noted for his mistreatment of the inmates, under the pretext that he was politically an Anglophile; other communists complained to him about Gheorghiu-Dej's stances. The period saw an impromptu prison inspection by Colonel Alexandru Petrescu, who, according to Foriș, had been called in to identify and punish delators, therefore backing Gheorghiu-Dej's group. Câmpeanu does not fully credit this account, but notes that it may furnish indirect proof for cooperation between the authorities and this particular communist faction, once the war no longer seemed winnable.

An irate Gheorghiu-Dej responded to Foriș's accusations, and aired some of his own grievances, in a letter that he wrote on rolling paper. The document inaugurated a "counter-inquiry" that became a nucleus of the PCR's "Foriș dossier". It formulated a standard narrative, depicting Foriș as either responsible for, or in any case satisfied by, the April 1941 clampdown, which had allowed him to "surround himself with worthless, docile, and suspicious elements"—the rhetoric targeted Koffler and Carp primarily. Gheorghiu-Dej's opposition movement soon rallied other communists, both inside prisons and in the underground. By some accounts, they were cheered on by Birtaș, who hoped that Foriș's removal would signal his own reinstatement as a PCR man. Among the prominent activists who had received Foriș' reproaches were Bodnăraș, Pîrvulescu, Rangheț, and, increasingly so, Pintilie. Bodnăraș was even demoted by the general secretary in March 1944—having been charged with keeping documents relative to planned sabotage actions, he was made responsible for the ease with which these were confiscated by the authorities.

According to Câmpeanu, the move against Foriș was pre-approved in Caransebeș by Gheorghiu-Dej; the mission was "extravagant", but its audacity helped to solidify lifetime links between the fellow conspirators. Upon arriving to a new detention spot in Târgu Jiu, Gheorghiu-Dej met with Popescu-Puțuri, whom Foriș had accused of being a fascist. The two agreed that the letter was "filthy calumny", with Gheorghiu-Dej adding: mă piș pe ea! ("I'll piss on it!"). Popescu-Puțuri played up his comrade's suspicions, that the PCR had "fallen into enemy hands", by recounting how Foriș had been allowed to walk out of jail during the Balog round-up of 1939. Gheorghiu-Dej was told by his sources, including Popescu-Puțuri, that the Central Committee was preparing a letter to have him removed from his offices; in his view, therefore, he acted defensively. He had by then vetoed both Rangheț's option, which was to calmly talk Foriș into accepting a new leadership, and the radical plan to have Foriș physically liquidated.

Câmpeanu writes that the scheme was also facilitated by other factors: one is that Foriș, a Comintern appointee, had lost his legitimacy once the Comintern had been dissolved; another was the Soviet push into north-eastern Romania, which would have legitimized whoever was general secretary at the moment of Soviet victory—"a general secretary arrested by his own party had little chance of inspiring confidence to the future occupiers." During communications between Gheorghiu-Dej and Bodnăraș, it was agreed in favor of toppling the entire PCR leadership. Two major factors contributed to Bodnăraș's high profile in the affair. One was his disseminating of rumors about having secured Soviet approval, resulting in his being viewed as representing the Soviet MGB; another was circumstantial: the Antonescu regime had allowed Bodnăraș to go free upon the completion of an earlier sentence. While intended as a ruse to document his contacts for the Siguranța, this move also allowed him direct access to Foriș.

=== Capture ===
Bodnăraș himself acknowledged that, despite the animosities, such access was rendered easy by Foriș's own sedentary nature: "Marius [...] would have me around for days on end. His way was to keep you up at night, to have you sleep with him in the same room; he would make the coffee, he would chain smoke and would just jabber on". Gheorghiu-Dej and his associates were rushed into taking the decision by another letter from Foriș. Seemingly congenial, it detailed a plan for a mass prison escape that was fundamentally impractical, and would have exposed those attempting it to the direst of consequences. This persuaded the group that they were engaged in an existential battle with Foriș. Having already sketched out his secret plan, Bodnăraș submitted to Foriș and Petrea one final time on 29 March 1944, when he appeared before them to discuss his inability to form resistance units; "Marius" proposed relieving him of his posting. During a break in the proceedings, Bodnăraș approached Rangheț and Pârvulescu, who advised him to strike as soon as possible.

On 4 April, just after a massive air bombing of Bucharest (which also destroyed Foriș's hiding place), Bodnăraș and Pîrvulescu, assisted by Rangheț, captured and deposed Foriș. Bodnăraș himself reported that the operation had discreet backing from Auschnitt and Colonel Victor Precup. The kidnapping took place at Foriș's temporary home on Carol Knappe Street, Domenii, with both Koffler and Sârbu present. Unable to assess the situation due to the ongoing bombing raids, Foriș accepted at face value Bodnăraș's claims of Soviet endorsement, handed in his pistol and his personal papers, and replied back: Eu mă supun ("I submit"). According to Câmpeanu, his failure to put up resistance evidences his Soviet political education, the doctrine that "one cannot be right against the party." A message drafted and read aloud by Bodnăraș was notable in that it failed to mention either what trespassing Foriș stood accused of, or who it was that would replace him. He never interrupted his reading—even though there were signs that Rangheț had failed to show up with the armed guard that would have neutralized any potential resistance. Only Sârbu tried to register her objection: when asked to hand in the PCR archive, she asked for a part session to be convened on the matter. Bodnăraș retorted that it was "too late for that".

As historian Sorin Oane puts it, Bodnăraș had unusual leeway, with "Foriș and his immediate helpers accepting their deposition as if hypnotized." Bodnăraș was satisfied with the overall docility of his targets, and left the house to look for Rangheț and his men. During that interval, Foriș, Koffler and Sârbu were guarded by Romeo Runcan; the three prisoners and their sentinel never questioned the legality of their situation. After regrouping, the conspirators locked Foriș up in Bodnăraș's safe house in Vatra Luminoasă, southern Bucharest, where their guards included Bodnăraș's wife Florica. After this, the three kidnappers established a joint leadership, or troika, which, during the same year, recognized Gheorghiu-Dej as the new general secretary. During the kidnapping, Gheorghiu-Dej was still awaiting for confirmation of Bodnăraș's success, which would have allowed him to prepare an escape from Târgu Jiu. When he received a letter attesting this, he rewarded the messenger (Popescu-Puțuri's wife Maria) with a gift of 2,000 lei. The note was encoded:

The inheritance [that is, the party documents] was passed down to us, and the head of the family [Foriș], his wife [Sârbu] and the family friend [Koffler] were taken to a good sanatorium [a house controlled by Bodnăraș' faction].

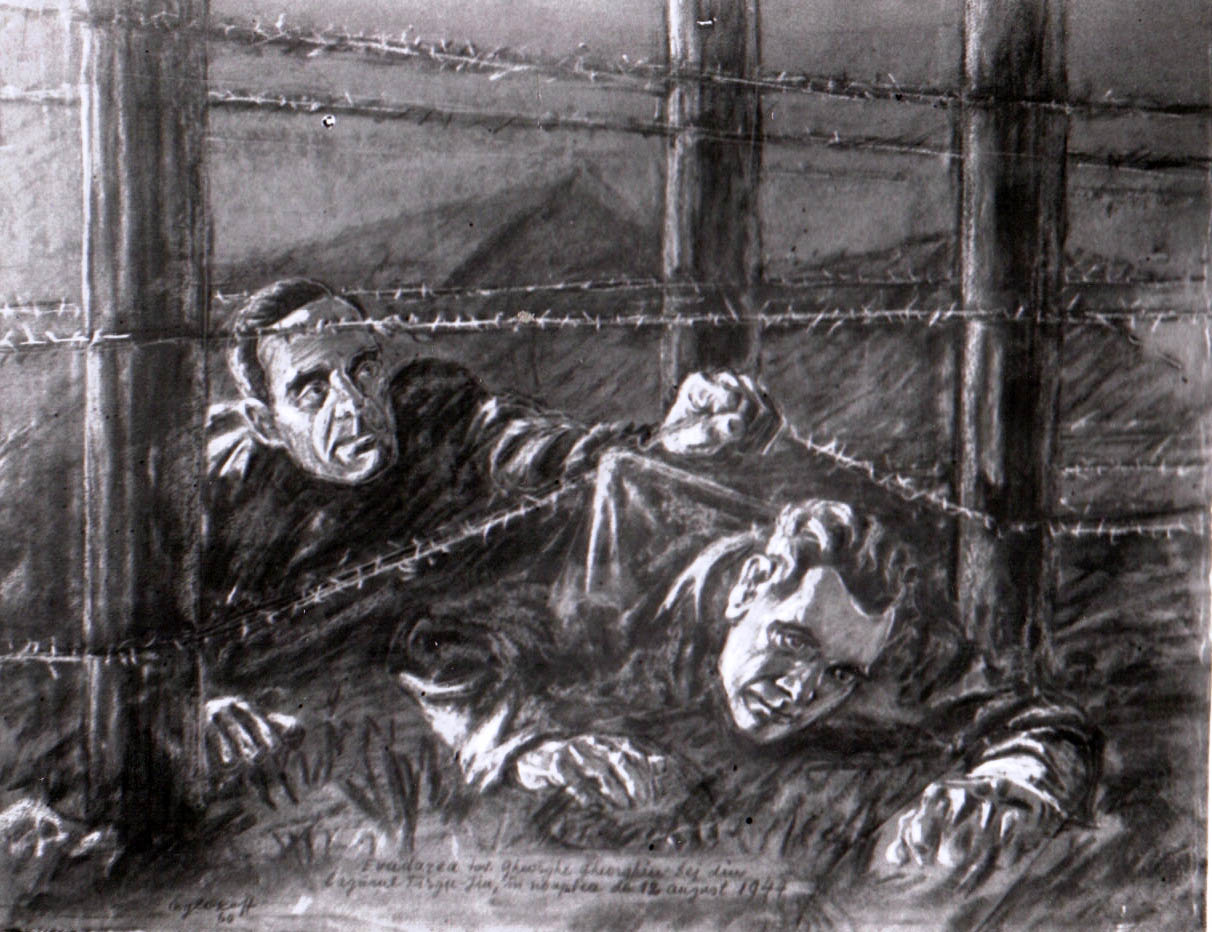
Gheorghe Gheorghiu-Dej (left) escaping from Târgu Jiu camp on 10 August 1944. Propaganda drawing from 1960

Gheorghiu-Dej's associate, Ion Vincze, described the events of 4 April as a "purge of the party leadership", carried out "without alerting the enemy." Pătrășcanu, who represented an isolated intellectual circle (which also included Miron Constantinescu and Grigore Preoteasa), had also agreed to support the move. His approval was probably obtained as early as 1943, though, as an outsider, he was never invited to share in the spoils. At the time, Foriș was alleged to have infiltrated the PCR as an informant for the Siguranța during the 1920s and '30s, and that collaboration with the authorities had ensured his freedom during the early 1940s. One such account argues that Foriș had agreed to help Siguranța agents in their 1930s fights with the Iron Guard. The official charge involved his "cowardice" in front of reactionary forces, probably due to his indifferent handling of the partisan movement.

After the event, Foriș was assigned a position on the editorial staff for the underground newspaper România Liberă, which he maintained throughout the final months of Antonescu's regime. This was shortly before the anti-German coup of August 23, which took Romania out of the Axis; during these events, Petrea was recovered by the PCR, serving as Bodnăraș' liaison with General Dumitru Dămăceanu. During the coup's aftermath, Antonescu himself was jailed in the Bodnăraș hideout at Vatra Luminoasă. The PCR took power as part of the National Democratic Bloc (backed by King Michael I), and Gheorghiu-Dej ordered Foriș to be taken into custody by the PCR's paramilitary unit, the Patriotic Combat Formations; kidnapped in late September, he was set free in January 1945. During the interval, he completed another self-critical report, which noted: "In order to avert any complications and for the party to carry out its tasks with support from the Red Army, I handed in all my network, at once. I submitted a written statement attesting my unconditional submission, which the new C[entral] C[ommittee] could use to take over the party with no obstacle left in its path."

=== Killing ===
The period also saw the "Muscovites" making their return to Romania, with Ana Pauker as their leader. According to an oral statement by Gheorghiu-Dej, Pauker feigned perplexity upon being confronted with Foriș's ouster: "But who was it that has replaced an elected leadership?" In his defense of Gheorghiu-Dej, Apostol claims that Pauker and the "Muscovites" had secretly hoped for a Foriș–Luca–Pauker troika, which would have overseen Romania's full dismemberment—with Hungary annexing Transylvania, and Western Moldavia absorbed by the Moldavian SSR (see Greater Moldova). Foriș's removal, Apostol concludes, was a preemptive strike to ensure that Romania could be recognized by the Allies. Apostol further claims that, in 1944, Gheorghiu-Dej had already consolidated his reputation as a figure in Romanian national-communism, whereas Foriș was an "anti-national", taking Romania itself "to the brink of destruction".

The issue was not explored further (Pauker "never sketched a single perceptible gesture toward having Foriș recovered"), and the former general secretary continued to be regarded as a dangerous character. On 6 January 1945, there was an apparent break in his persecution, with Bodnăraș informing him that he had been found innocent and would be sent to do agitprop work in Cluj County. After rumors that he had authored a manifesto questioning the actions of Gheorghiu-Dej, Bodnăraș and others, he was again captured on 23 March, only to be released twenty days later. During that interval, he went on hunger strike and authored his "Last Will", which ended with a statement of his faith in the PCR, the Soviet Union, and Joseph Stalin. His last time in relative freedom occurred during late May and early June, when he was allowed to move in with his companion Victoria. On 9 June, a squad led by Pintilie approached Foriș on Calea Victoriei, and again kidnapped him. Apparently, this happened while Foriș was purchasing supplies needed for a trip to Hungary, having planned to settle with his family in a house owned by one of Victoria's brothers.

In the 1960s, Pintilie, who was serving as Securitate chief, told prosecutor Grigore Răduică that the Soviet Embassy had asked Gheorghiu-Dej to have "Marius" murdered before the Allied Commission could investigate the case. Răduică reports that this was "around February 1945", which is more than a year before Foriș's death, as documented in other sources. As historian Robert Levy notes, this one-year interval reflects the total period that Foriș spent as Pintilie's prisoner. According to various reports, his killing was ultimately decided through a confidential vote at the top of the party. The final decision was taken by Gheorghiu-Dej, Georgescu, Luca, and Pauker—interrogated as a deviationist in 1952, Georgescu claimed to have masterminded the plan. Apostol reports that Gheorghiu-Dej had originally wanted Foriș tried by a jury of his peers in the underground PCR; eventually: "I suppose that Dej was presented with a done deal when it comes to Foriș". Overall, he claims, "Dej had no decisive role in [his] killing." Levy credits Pauker's opposing account, which is that "Foriș's 1946 execution was carried out on orders of Dej and Bodnăraș, without the party Secretariat's knowledge or approval." He reports that accounts of Pauker's innocence are also provided by Pintilie's wife Ana Toma, as well as by Victoria Sârbu's sister Maria.

According to later testimonies, Foriș was attacked by Pintilie and Pintilie's chauffeur, Dumitru Neciu (known to Georgescu as Petre Bulgaru, and to others as Mitea); Pintilie shattered his skull using a crowbar. The two conspirators buried Foriș in a nearby yard on Aleea Alexandru, Dorobanți, outside the building which came to house the Polish Embassy; they covered the hole with earth and debris. When her lover would not return home, Victoria Sârbu filed a missing persons complaint with the Romanian Police. Two of Foriș's collaborators were killed in the same manner during the following days, and buried on Aleea Alexandru, in similar circumstances. Răduică had no means of verifying their identities, but relied on Pintilie's vague recollections: "the second one [after Foriș] was some citizen from Timișoara area, whom people knew as 'the kraut', but whose real name he did not know, [...] as for the third one, as he put it, he had no way of recalling who that was." One of the two victims is now known to have been named Nicolae Pârgariu, also rendered as "Ion Zelea Pârgaru". The other was tentatively identified as Petre Melinte.

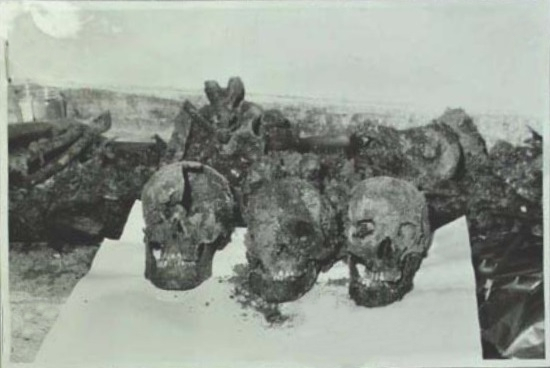
Skulls of Foriș, Nicolae Pârgariu, and another male victim (possibly Petre Melinte), dug up and photographed during the rehabilitation of 1968

As recounted by Răduică, "when asked by Gheorghiu-Dej what he had done with Foriș, Pintilie answered 'I have finished him off', his statement taken by Dej with a short silent break". Closely followed by the establishment of a Romanian communist state, this purge opened the road for further attacks on the members of the "secretariat faction"—beginning with arbitrary arrests of PCR members who were pressured to testify against Foriș. Gheorghiu-Dej and others in the new party leadership ensured that Koffler and Pătrășcanu were depicted as members of one and the same spy ring as Foriș. The original indictment had it that "the imperialists have used [...] Foriș, Koffler, and Pătrășcanu, to whom they attributed roles as the inner-party fifth column." In March 1950, Koffler protested against these maneuvers, and overall against Gheorghiu-Dej's indifference to legality, asking:

Where is [Foriș] these days? Has he had a trial? How may we condemn the fascists for liquidating Thälmann, [...] when we, the party of honesty, of truth, will suppress an honest communist—or, in case he is guilty, why hasn't he faced trial?

This campaign culminated in the 1954 execution of Koffler and Pătrășcanu, at the end of a trial orchestrated by the communist regime (it also involved Emil Calmanovici, who was killed, or left to die, while in custody). The latter affair aired some of the charges leveled against Foriș himself, which, historian Lavinia Betea notes, included trivial details—Foriș stood accused of courting his female subordinates, of humiliating comrades Răceanu and Rangheț, and of leaving important documents with Mircea Biji, whom the Siguranța had captured. The claim that Foriș had mishandled sabotage works was meant to conceal Bodnăraș's own incompetent handling of PCR materiel.

== Legacy ==
=== Cover-up and rumors ===
Scholar Balázs Szalontai cites Foriș's liquidation as an example that inner-party purges could develop locally in Eastern European communism—before Stalin had them included in his guidelines for governance. The same trend, he notes, was illustrated when Mustafa Gjinishi was killed by the Albanian resistance. Political scientist Vladimir Tismăneanu draws another parallel between Foriș and Marceli Nowotko, who was likely assassinated by his rivals within the Polish Workers' Party. The homegrown component is also highlighted in other sources, with historian Adrian Cioroianu and journalist Victor Frunză arguing that Foriș's dismissal marked a complete rupture in historical continuity between the PCR as established in 1921 and the post-1944 group. As Cioroianu notes, the final version of the PCR was entirely shaped by the group of Caransebeș prisoners.

At a party plenary meeting in November or December 1961, Gheorghiu-Dej introduced another element to his justification, claiming that, before his execution, "Zidaru" had sent a message to Caransebeș, asking his comrades "not to forget about Foriș". As one of the Caransebeș conspirators, Vincze marked the 20th anniversary of the August coup in 1964 with an article in Scînteia. Written in the context of De-Stalinization, it alleged that Foriș had always been an agent of the Siguranța, and that this had gone unnoticed in the Soviet Union. Vincze argued that Stalin, made overconfident by his cult of personality, had "imposed Foriș as PCR leader, without having consulted the party base, and without a profound investigation into his political profile." According to Foriș family tradition, General Medrea handled the destruction of Foriș's private archives, though some of them, regarding underground activities up to 1944, were quietly transported into Soviet territory.

Into the 1950s, the regime dedicated resources to finding out whether Foriș had in fact ever been recruited by the Siguranța. Teohari Georgescu personally interrogated the former Siguranța boss, Eugen Cristescu, asking him to validate the rumor, but "could not find out". Historian Cristian Troncotă suggests that this failure was not necessarily proof of Foriș's innocence: "[Cristescu knew] that any such disclosure could spell his end. [...] when one exposes even just one name, he's likely to expose all, and some of the ex-informant comrades were still alive, and holding on to important positions in the party hierarchy or in state government." As Câmpeanu notes, official takes were unwittingly debunked in 1960 by Bodnăraș, who recounted that he and "Marius" were discussing details about Gheorghiu-Dej's planned escape from prison. Had he believed that Foriș was a Siguranța man, he could not have made him privy to such schemes.

PCR activist Ion Gheorghe Maurer argues that, around the same time, he was working on a samizdat critical of Marxism, and that he had informed Gheorghiu-Dej, otherwise a "close friend", about his intentions. This made him fear "that I'd get hit upside the head, like Foriș"; in one instance, Pintilie reportedly confirmed that the Soviet command was for Maurer to be similarly liquidated. Petre Pandrea, a former lawyer of the imprisoned communists who had conversed with Foriș, had by then run afoul of Gheorghiu-Dej's administration, and was serving time in Aiud prison. By 1961, he had been allowed to keep diaries, informing of his recurring thoughts about the plight of men and women that he still regarded as heroes of their cause, including Foriș. As Pandrea put it:

I do not believe that engineer Foriș, a general secretary of the PCR, was ever a Siguranța asset. This is my intuition, and all I have as proof is the atmosphere, the climate, the memories of my nightlong conversation with the man. Engineer Foriș was too stern, too little a hoodlum, too unslippery, too upright and solemn, for him to be playing a double-game. And why would he have? For the money? Engineers are always quick to find work. The Foriș dossier remains open and blood-stained.

=== Rehabilitation ===
In April 1968, Foriș and Pătrășcanu were rehabilitated by the Central Committee of the Romanian Communist Party which was by then under the leadership of Gheorghiu-Dej's successor, Nicolae Ceaușescu. A special party committee, headed by Foriș's enemy Ion Popescu-Puțuri, found suspicions of treason to have been spurious in Foriș's case. It also concluded that the latter had shown incompetence in handling party matters during his time in office, and that he had allowed the group to be infiltrated by Siguranța agents. In speech to the PCR session in Bucharest, Ceaușescu summarized the commission's findings, as well as his own conclusions from them: "[the commission noted that Foriș] was innocent, that he was executed without any legal grounding, and what is more, without even a trial—that, in this case as well [as others], we are actually dealing with an assassination." As summarized by Câmpeanu: "While disavowing Gheorghiu-Dej, Ceaușescu rehabilitated Foriș but constantly underscored his faults, and only absolved Pătrășcanu of the treason and espionage charges". Later in the same year, Foriș's body was uncovered and reburied at the Monument of the Heroes for the Freedom of the People and of the Motherland, for Socialism in Bucharest's Freedom Park. Investment in his crypt was an unexpected expenditure, and costs were cut by using Rușchița marble rather than imported Bohus granite used on Gheorghiu-Dej and others.

The inquiry results were communicated to PCR sections, leading some activists to voice their dismay. Vasile Daju of Timiș County expressed disbelief that such "terrorist actions" could occur under the watch of Gheorghiu-Dej, "whom all the people treasured and loved". Also in Timiș, Paul Niculescu-Mizil underscored the notion that, for all his mistakes, "there was nothing to justify the barbarian, extrajudicial killing, crowbar-to-the-head, of a party ex-leader." As the committee's main attribute was parting with the legacy of Gheorghiu-Dej, Foriș's case remained without other notable consequences (Teohari Georgescu himself was later assigned another office inside the PCR). Publicizing "Marius"'s killing proved instrumental in Pintilie's expulsion from the party. Nevertheless, the assassin was still present at official ceremonies, and was decorated with the Tudor Vladimirescu Order only two years later. The event was ridiculed by Jean Coller, a second-rank activist who had learned about Foriș's fate. The ceremony also honored poet Aurel Baranga, leading Coller to name it Ranga și Baranga ("The Crowbar-anga").

The rehabilitation was allowed some exposure in the cultural press, as with a May 1968 editorial by Radu Popescu, which thanked the party leadership for their restitution of justice, commenting that both Foriș and Pătrășcanu had endured "unimaginable torture" and "continuous infamy". Around the same time, an issue of the popular history magazine Magazin Istoric, which unwittingly exposed the circumstances of Foriș's killing, was removed form circulation by the censorship apparatus. Rumors confirmed by censor Leonte Răutu had it that Ceaușescu himself ordered this freeze. In a 1969 article about PCR involvement in the coup against Antonescu, Popescu-Puțuri observed:

party activity was under stress due to some shortcomings and mistakes of general secretary Șt[efan] Foriș, reflecting his negative traits of character and methods unfit for the party, [and] creating an abnormal state within the party [...]. After some preparatory measures, on 4 April 1944 Șt[efan] Foriș was removed from his position as general secretary of the PCR C[entral] C[ommittee]. This act stood as an important moment in the life and activity of the party, restoring its unity of action, its combative and mobilizing capacity.

Another party historian, Mihai Rusenescu, argued:

A majority of papers published before 1964 have described Șt[efan] Foriș as a traitor or an enemy agent. Documents published after that date show that on 4 April Ștefan Foriș and others in the party leadership were removed for activities which display serious shortcomings and grave mistakes. This does not however mean that he was responsible of treason.

The same argument was taken up by Nedelcu in his Scînteia of 11 May 1972, which marked Foriș's 80th birthday. However, as cautioned by historian Florian Banu, the rehabilitation formed part of Ceaușescu's "smokescreen". This was

designed to camouflage maneuvers which allowed [him as] the new leader to concentrate full power in his own hands. The new era, one 'enshrining socialist legality', did not in fact differ from the former unless it was in the intensity of violence exerted against one's opponents.

Betea suggests that the new leadership maintained secret knowledge about Bodnăraș's misdeeds, including when it came to Foriș's "elimination", and used them to pressure him into total compliance. Additionally, Ștefan Andrei recalls private meetings with Ceaușescu in which the latter "would not fully criticize Foriș"—the communist leader described the plan to break Gheorghiu-Dej out of jail as commendable. Câmpeanu contrarily notes that Ceaușescu, as a Gheorghiu-Dej acolyte for his entire youth, never actually met Foriș, but only understood him as a cautionary example of weakness:

Perhaps the core lesson that this passed on was one about the latent vulnerability of the a general secretary's position. Two decades after being consummated, Foriș's experience provided Ceaușescu with the awareness that limitless power as provided by the office could only become effective if the one using it transformed it into a personal attribute.

If Ceaușescu perpetuated and enhanced dictatorial practices, it was largely because Foriș's "absolute failure", whence "any general secretary who allows his advisers to engage him in disputes is committing political suicide". Ceaușescu's unwillingness to either reform the PCR or relinquish power resulted in his being toppled by the December 1989 Revolution. In its penultimate phase, power passed from the PCR to a National Salvation Front, and the Ceaușescus were executed. As argued by political scientist Alexandru Gussi, the outcome was steeped in the history of "violence as experienced between PCR leaders, especially during the change of leadership"—with the Foriș assassination as a paradigm. Publishing his memoirs shortly after, Silviu Brucan, who had also participated in the Revolution, referred to Foriș as having been removed by a "coup de force", whereby Bodnăraș and Rangheț "pushed the illegal work along a dynamic line."

== Personal life and family ==
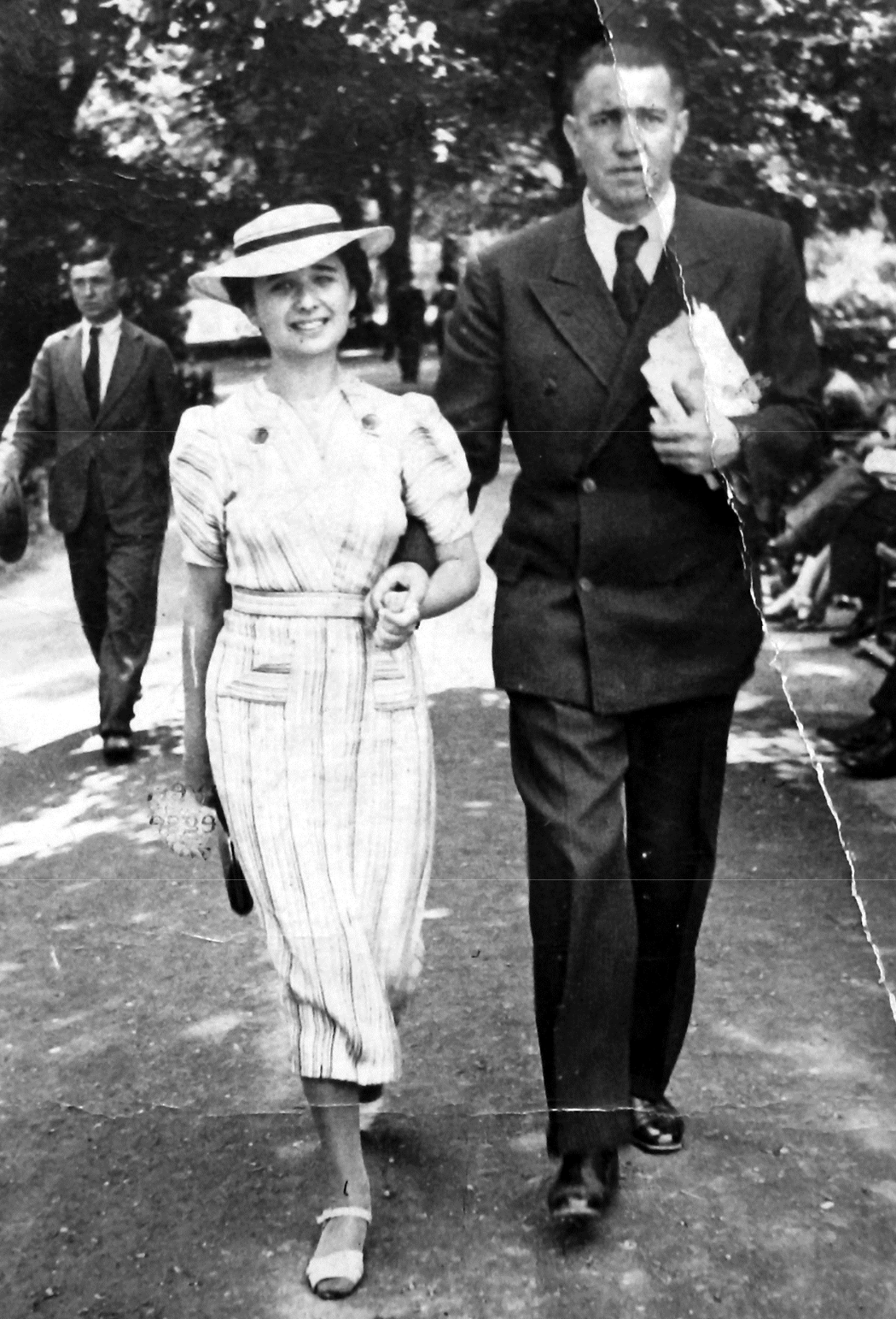
Foriș and Victoria Sârbu, candid shot of c. 1944

Foriș's lover, Victoria Sârbu, was born in Soroca, Bessarabia in 1909. Though she is often depicted as a Bessarabian Jew, she was in fact of Serbian Romanian and Romanian Bessarabian heritage; while her father had taken to Bolshevism, one of her brothers, Iulian Sârbu, sympathized with the Iron Guard. As an unemployed graduate of the University of Iași's Faculty of Natural Science, Victoria worked as a courier for the Red Aid, before joining PCR defense teams for indicted party members. During the 1930s, she organized communist cells on the Prahova Valley, where both her brothers worked as teachers. Victoria carried out her activities as a party leader during the war, though there is disagreement regarding her membership status: while some sources suggest that she had not joined the party throughout most of her underground career, her grandson, Ștefan Sîrbu, regards her as an early inductee. At one point, her sister, Elena Pavel, was unsuccessfully courted by Gheorghiu-Dej. She engaged in political agitation alongside Ștefan Pavel, who became her husband. He was eventually notorious as Foriș's political enemy, serving as Minister of the Interior in the 1950s.

Among the charges brought against Foriș was his alleged attempt to seduce Constanța Crăciun, a prominent PCR activist who supported Gheorghiu-Dej; he was accused of having pressured her to become his mistress at the time when she was already in a relationship with Vincze, and of having thus caused her a nervous breakdown which had facilitated her capture by authorities. Under pressure from her interrogators, Sârbu partly confirmed the rumor, stating that she had become Foriș's partner soon after the incident. At the time of her lover's kidnapping, Victoria was heavily pregnant. After being held in a cellar in Floreasca during the early months of April 1945, she gave birth to a daughter, Vera-Victoria Foriș, whom the couple named in celebration of victory over fascism.

Following Foriș's disappearance, his mother repeatedly petitioned authorities to answer as to his whereabouts. The standard account is that, in 1947, a group of secret policemen allegedly acting on the orders of Gheorghiu-Dej, and supervised by Alexandru Nicolschi, kidnapped her from her residence in Oradea. They then tied rocks to her neck and drowned her in the Crișul Repede. During his hearing of 1967, Nicolschi indicated that Gavrilă Birtaș, who had become one of his subordinates in Oradea, had taken the initiative: "Comrade Bîrtaș [sic] had received the indication to talk to her and get her to return to Oradea and admit herself into an old people's home. Details of how Comrade Bîrtaș has accomplished the mission are not known to me." Historian Doina Jela argued in 2001 that the story might be revised, since some later finds suggest that Anna Fóris died in hospital, and that the Securitate only disposed of her dead body.

Persecutions of various kinds also touched other members of Foriș's entourage. Carp and Petrea "were kept in jail for years on end." Ladislau Redlingher, who had bunked with "Marius" in his father's villa during 1941, was told that his activity in the PCR underground would not be recognized by the party leadership: "he had not been involved, as he imagined, in protecting the general secretary, but rather Foriș the traitor". Formally imprisoned in December 1949, Victoria was indicted in the Pătrășcanu–Remus Koffler trial, and repeatedly tortured during that inquiry. She was held in custody for another six years, being ultimately sentenced in April 1954. She was set free in 1955, after a medical examination found that she was mentally ill. At the time, she was yet unsure about her partner's demise. The issue was cleared in the mid-to-late 1960s, when Pintilie, who had "gone insane", phoned her brother Eugen and confessed to the killing—he later rescinded, placing full blame on Neciu. Also then, Sârbu filed an appeal, which resulted in her rehabilitation by the Supreme Tribunal on 28 May 1968.

According to Apostol, "after 23 August 1944", and to her husband's death, Loti was "visiting almost daily" with the Foriș–Sârbu couple. Alone among the women who had been romantically tied to "Marius", she took and preserved his last name. She still had it in April 1945, when she served under Ana Pauker in the Anti-fascist Union of Romanian Women, and in February 1948, when she was elected to the Central Committee of the Union of Democratic Women. Câmpeanu believes that she carried the name to her death, but this is inaccurate: in her later life, she went as "Laura Cernea". While her own daughter embraced anti-communism, Victoria spent the late 1950s as an employee of the State Library, after which she was allowed back into the PCR nomeklatura. According to family tradition, she was again snubbed after a social gaffe at a party, which stemmed from her shock at having come face to face with Bodnăraș. In old age, her only income was as a pensioner of the Red Aid society. Vera, who trained as a geophysicist, changed her last name to Sîrbu upon her 18th birthday—though she also reconnected with her father's roots by learning Hungarian. She never fully recovered from the shock caused by the persecution of her parents; after 1968, she was awarded a pension from the Romanian state.

Loti died in January 1987, followed by Victoria in December of that same year. Vera committed suicide in 1989. This was shortly ahead of the anti-communist revolution, which resulted in the Freedom Park mausoleum being repurposed. By 1999, Ștefan Foriș's remains had been sent back to his surviving relatives. Never married, Vera was survived by three children from three different men, whose identities remain unknown. She had grown estranged from first-born daughter Sanda (died 2007), whom she regarded as a Securitate informant; another daughter moved to The Netherlands, where Foriș's great-granddaughter was born. Elena Pavel, who had since died in a prison fire, had continued to be used as an asset in PCR propaganda for as long as the regime lasted; her and Victoria's sister, Maria Sîrbu, was a professor at the University of Bucharest Faculty of Physics, where she sometimes spoke to her students about Elena's "combative firmness". A similar cult had developed around Foriș's lover Tatiana Leapis-Bulan. Leapis-Bulan rose through the PCR ranks after the 1960s, owing to her inclusion in Elena Ceaușescu's intimate circle of friends.

== Notes ==
Party political offices
Preceded by Boris Stefanov	General secretary of the Romanian Communist Party; 1940–1944	Succeeded by Gheorghe Gheorghiu-Dej
