= Nicolae Massim =

Romanian theatre director

Nicolae Massim (1909–1981) was a Romanian theater director. A graduate of the School of Liberal Arts and Philosophy of the University of Cluj, Romania, and of the Institute of Theatre and Film Arts (IATC), Bucharest, he made his directorial debut staging historical plays by the renowned historian Nicolae Iorga at the Cultural League Theatre of the People's University that Iorga founded in the town of Vălenii de Munte.

== Career ==
At the National Theatre Bucharest, Nicolae Massim made his debut as assistant director to Ion Sahighian, and during long and distinguished career with the National Theatre, Nicolae Massim directed many memorable hits such as Othello, The House of Bernarda Alba or "The Glass of Water". In parallel with his activity at the National Theatre of Bucharest, Nicolae Massim was a professor, and for a while the dean of the Stage Directing department, within the Institute of Dramatic Arts and Cinematography (IATC) of Bucharest.

In 1945, together with Lucia Calomeri, an actress, Elena Pătrășcanu and Lena Constante, set design artists, Nicolae Massim founded the world-famous "Țăndărica" Marionette and Puppet Theatre of Bucharest. Recruiting a first nucleus of talented and enthusiastic puppeteers such as Dorina Tănăsescu, Antigona Papazicopol and Elvira Chladek, and using the voices of reputed actors from the National Theatre of Bucharest, Nicolae Massim directed the first marionette show in Romania "With Țăndărica to the Southern Seas". After that, throughout his entire career, Nicolae Massim remained an enthusiastic contributor to the theatre being an artistic mentor of stage director Margareta Niculescu, his former student at IATC, who in 1949 replaced Lucia Calomeri as artistic director of the theatre.

== Later life ==
After a long and distinguished directorial and teaching career, Nicolae Massim was forced to leave the National Theatre Bucharest for political reasons and accept an artistic director position of the less prestigious "Youth Theatre". At that theatre Nicolae Massim worked with young and promising actors such as Florin Vasiliu, George Marcovici, Olga Tudorache, Mircea Anghelescu, the Ciprian brothers, the Marsellos brothers or the Sahighian sisters, contributing to establishing them as stars in memorable plays such as a stage adaptation of Dickens' David Copperfield, Schiller's The Brigands, Shakespeare's Much Ado About Nothing, Shaw's Bunbery and many others. In addition to helping young talents achieve stardom, Nicolae Massim was also diligent to bring back to the limelight established veterans of the Romanian stage, such as Maria Filotti, who had been condemned to oblivion by the communist authorities because of their "bourgeois" origins.
