= Lucrețiu Pătrășcanu =

Romanian communist politician (1900–1954)

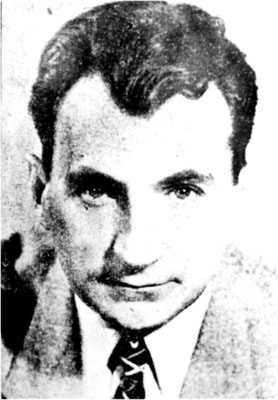

Minister of Justice of Romania
- In office 23 August 1944 – 23 February 1948
- Prime Minister: Constantin Sănătescu; Nicolae Rădescu; Petru Groza
- Preceded by: Ion C. Marinescu
- Succeeded by: Avram Bunaciu

Personal details
- Born: 4 November 1900 Bacău, Kingdom of Romania
- Died: 17 April 1954 (aged 53) Jilava Prison, Ilfov County, Romanian People's Republic
- Cause of death: Execution by shooting
- Party: Romanian Communist Party
- Spouse(s): Elena Pătrășcanu, née Schwamern
- Parent(s): Dimitrie D. Pătrășcanu; Lucreția Pătrășcanu
- Education: University of Bucharest; Leipzig University
- Profession: Lawyer

Lucrețiu Pătrășcanu (Romanian pronunciation: [luˈkretsju pətrəʃˈkanu]; 4 November 1900 – 17 April 1954) was a Romanian communist politician and leading member of the Communist Party of Romania (PCR), also noted for his activities as a lawyer, sociologist and economist. For a while, he was a professor at the University of Bucharest. Pătrășcanu rose to a government position before the end of World War II and, after having disagreed with Stalinist tenets on several occasions, eventually came into conflict with the Romanian Communist government of Gheorghe Gheorghiu-Dej. He became a political prisoner and was ultimately executed. Fourteen years after Pătrășcanu's death, Romania's new communist leader, Nicolae Ceaușescu, endorsed his rehabilitation as part of a change in policy.

== Early life ==
Pătrășcanu was born in Bacău to a leading political family, as the son of Poporanist figure Dimitrie D. Pătrășcanu (Lucrețiu's mother, Lucreția, was a scion of the Stoika family of Transylvanian petty nobility). He became a Poporanist and later a socialist in his youth, joining the Socialist Party of Romania in 1919, and working as editor of its newspaper, Socialismul (1921). Professionally, he was educated at the University of Bucharest's Faculty of Law, from which he graduated in 1922, and at Leipzig University, earning his PhD in 1925.

He had an intense journalistic activity. Collaborator in numerous newspapers, where he published his articles under various pseudonyms: M Andreescu; Bercu; R. Boldur; Coca; V. Dragomir; Fischer; Ghiță; Grigorescu; Ion. C. Ion; N. Lascenco; Mihalcea; Miron; Victor Mălin; A. Moldoveanu; Andrei Moldoveanu; L. D. Pătrășcanu; Stătescu; Titu; Vrabie and with the initials A. M and L. D. P.

Increasingly radical after the success of the October Revolution, he was one of the original members of the PCR (known as PCdR at the time) in 1921. Pătrășcanu, Elek Köblös, and Ana and Marcel Pauker were the representatives of the group to the 4th Comintern Congress in Moscow (November–December 1922). Back in Romania, Pătrășcanu was arrested and imprisoned at Jilava in 1924 (the year when the party was outlawed); he went on hunger strike until being relocated to a prison hospital.

At the Kharkiv Congress of 1928, where he was present under the name Mironov, Pătrășcanu clashed with the Comintern overseer Bohumír Šmeral, as well as with many of his fellow party members, over the issue of Bessarabia and Moldovenism, which was to be passed into a resolution stating that Greater Romania was an imperialist entity. Pătrășcanu argued:

Moldovans are not a nation apart and – from a historical and geographical point of view – Moldovans are the same Romanians as the Romanians in Moldavia [on the right bank of the Prut River]. Thus, I believe that the introduction of such a false point renders the resolution itself false.

== 1930s ==
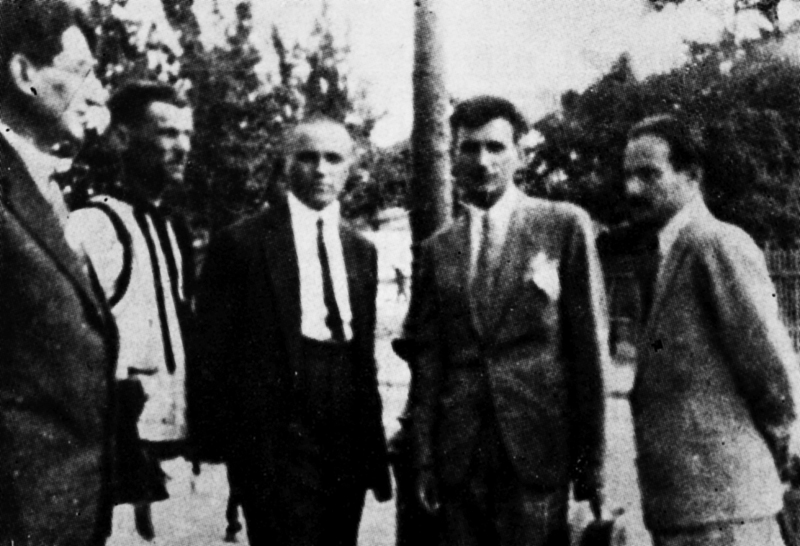
Eugen Rozvan, Vasile Cașul, Ștefan Dan, Pătrășcanu, and Imre Aladar in 1931

With Imre Aladar, Eugen Rozvan, and two others, Pătrășcanu was elected to the Chamber of Deputies in May 1931 as a candidate for the Workers and Peasants' Bloc, an umbrella group masking the outlawed party. Later in the same year, the 5th Party Congress (held in Soviet exile, at Gorikovo), chose him among the new Central Committee members while Alexander Stefanski rose to the position of general secretary.

In 1932, he was involved in polemics at the Criterion group, where he and his collaborator Belu Zilber defended a Stalinist view of Vladimir Lenin in front of criticism from the right-wing Mircea Vulcănescu and Mihail Polihroniade, as well as from the Austromarxist perspective of Henri H. Stahl.

Pătrășcanu again served as the PCdR's representative to the Comintern in 1933, and 1934 (remaining in Moscow until 1935); Stelian Tănase argues that during this time he developed doubts about Stalinism itself. During the following years, Pătrășcanu continued to prioritize opposition to fascism, and remained active in the PCR. In 1936, he was heading the defense team of PCR members who were facing the much-publicized Craiova Trial, but was himself denounced as a communist and consequently handed the position to Ion Gheorghe Maurer.

== World War II imprisonment ==
Pătrășcanu was imprisoned during World War II and, after August 1940, spent time at the Târgu Jiu internment camp with Gheorghe Gheorghiu-Dej and the "prison faction" of the Party (the communists inside Romania, virtually all imprisoned at various stages of the war, as opposed to those who had taken refuge inside the Soviet Union).

Like his fellow activist Scarlat Callimachi, he was set free by the National Legionary Government while the fascist Iron Guard, which allied Romania with Nazi Germany, was trying to preserve good relations with the Soviet Union. He subsequently followed orders from Teohari Georgescu to re-create a defunct outlet of the party, the cultural society Amicii URSS ("Friends of the USSR").

In 1941, following the Legionary Rebellion, he was again arrested by the regime of Conducător Ion Antonescu. After a release from camp for health reasons in 1943, he was under house arrest in Poiana Țapului; allowed to settle in Bucharest later in that year, he remained under supervision until May 1944.

== 1944 negotiations and fall of Foriș ==
According to Ioan Mocsony Stârcea, marshal of King Michael I's court between 1942 and 1944, he met Pătrășcanu in April 1944 in order to mediate an agreement between the monarch and the Communists regarding a pro-Allied move to overthrow Antonescu and withdraw Romania, which was fighting the Soviets on the Eastern Front, from the Axis.

Pătrășcanu (together with Emil Bodnăraș) represented the Communist Party during the clandestine talks with the National Liberal and National Peasants' parties, aimed at overthrowing the Antonescu dictatorship. Corneliu Coposu, who later claimed had friendly contacts with Pătrășcanu at the time, also claimed that the latter had been selected by the Soviets as representative of the Communists (during negotiations in Cairo, Nikolai Novikov, the Soviet ambassador to Egypt, had reportedly first mentioned Pătrășcanu's name to Barbu Știrbey for further contacts). It was also at this time that Gheorghiu-Dej and Bodnăraș, together with Constantin Pîrvulescu and Iosif Rangheț, toppled the general secretary Ștefan Foriș, and assumed leadership of the party (Gheorghiu-Dej had probably attracted Pătrășcanu's support for the planned move as early as 1943).

According to Mocsony Stârcea, Pătrășcanu was responsible for a compromise between the Communist Party and institutions of the Romanian monarchy (allegedly assuring the king that it was not his party's intent to proclaim a republic without a previous referendum on the matter). Coposu also claimed that, through Pătrășcanu, the Communist Party had entered negotiations with the other opposition groups and informed them of abandoning its previous theses of the future Romanian state.

== 23 August and government position ==
The collaboration led to the arrest of Ion Antonescu and Mihai Antonescu at the Royal Palace in Bucharest, during the 23 August Coup (1944). Pătrășcanu (together with Belu Zilber) authored the proclamation to the country which the king read on National Radio immediately after the coup, and, confronting the new Premier Constantin Sănătescu, imposed himself as a PCR representative on the delegation that signed Romania's armistice with the Soviets, on 12 September 1944. Present in Moscow, he contacted Ana Pauker and Vasile Luca through their overseer Andrey Vyshinsky, reestablishing communication between the two major sections of the PCR. Pătrășcanu joined the Central Committee in 1945 – after having returned to Romania with the Red Army late in 1944 – and was largely responsible for the success his party had in controlling Romania's legal framework for the following years.

During Soviet occupation, he served on the Romanian Politburo from 1946 to 1947 and held power in the new governments, as Minister without Portfolio (1944) and Minister of Justice (1944–1948). Pătrășcanu, who attempted to become general secretary early in 1944 (before Gheorghiu-Dej secured the position for himself), was considered leader of the party's "Secretariat Communists" (perceived as less willing to follow Stalin's directions).

After the ascension of the Petru Groza government, Pătrășcanu was also one of the initiators of purges and persecutions, being responsible for dismissing and arresting members of the civil service who were considered suspect, for the creation of the Romanian People's Tribunals, as well as the appointment of prosecutors (promoting Avram Bunaciu, Constanța Crăciun, and Alexandra Sidorovici).

Citing a statement by Pătrășcanu rendered by The New York Times, British Trotskyist commentator Tony Cliff extended his critique of the people's democracies of the Eastern Bloc to the realm of justice systems and retribution for war crimes. According to the American newspaper, Pătrășcanu had reassured media that "industrialists, businessmen and bankers will escape punishment as war criminals"; Cliff also argued that the new course in justice had failed to alter what he saw as Romania's "bureaucratic and militarist character". Indeed, under Pătrășcanu, Romania was the only country in Eastern Europe to initiate only a small number of court proceedings against accused war criminals and collaborators. This declaration of practically singular responsibility allowed many of those guilty of war crimes and collaboration to escape punishment in postwar Romania. The postwar regime "went easy" on the mass of genocidal antisemites, sentencing them to relatively minor punishments. Early amnesties were often granted. For example, on 1 June 1945, Pătrășcanu successfully had 29 death sentences commuted by the King.

Pătrășcanu put pressure on King Michael to sign legislation that went against the letter of the 1923 Constitution, which contributed to the latter's decision to initiate the "royal strike" (a refusal to countersign documents issued by the Groza executive).

== Early conflicts with the Party ==
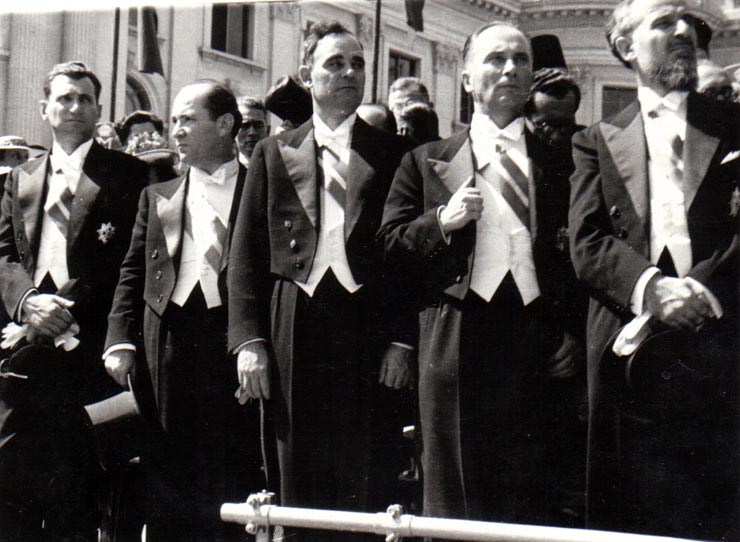
Pătrășcanu, Teohari Georgescu, Gheorghe Gheorghiu-Dej, Lothar Rădăceanu, and Ștefan Voitec at the 23 August 1945 Parade in Palace Square, Bucharest

During the late 1940s, he is thought to have begun expressing his opposition to strict Stalinist guidelines; at the same time, Pătrășcanu had become suspect to the rest of the party leadership for his intellectual approach to socialism. Gheorghe Apostol, a collaborator of Gheorghiu-Dej's, later expressed a particular view on the matter of Pătrășcanu's relations with the rest of the party:

He was a reliable party intellectual. But he was also a very arrogant man, self-important, intolerant, and unwilling to communicate with his party comrades. And yet, Gheorghiu-Dej treasured him. Between '46–'48, Pătrășcanu changed quite a lot."

Around February 1945, he began to fear the possibility that Emil Bodnăraș was planning his assassination and that he intended to blame it on political opponents of the Communist Party (as a means to direct sympathy towards the latter group). He suspected that Bodnăraș had chosen to back Gheorghiu-Dej (allegedly fearing that Pătrășcanu was betraying the fragile alliance established before the fall of Ștefan Foriș). Consequently, he attempted to block Bodnăraș's rise to power, and denounced his reputedly corrupt activities as Secretary in the Interior Ministry to the other members of the leadership.

Historiography is divided over the possibility of Pătrășcanu having initially allied himself with the PCR's second in command, Ana Pauker, in her post-war confrontation with Gheorghiu-Dej. It is apparent that Pătrășcanu was alarmed by Pauker's close cooperation with Soviet overseers, and especially by her tight connection with Dmitry Manuilsky; it was also contended that Pauker was intrigued by Pătrășcanu's self-promotion in front of Soviet overseers during late 1944. Under arrest, however, Pătrășcanu asserted that he was closest to Pauker and Teohari Georgescu among the Romanian party leaders.

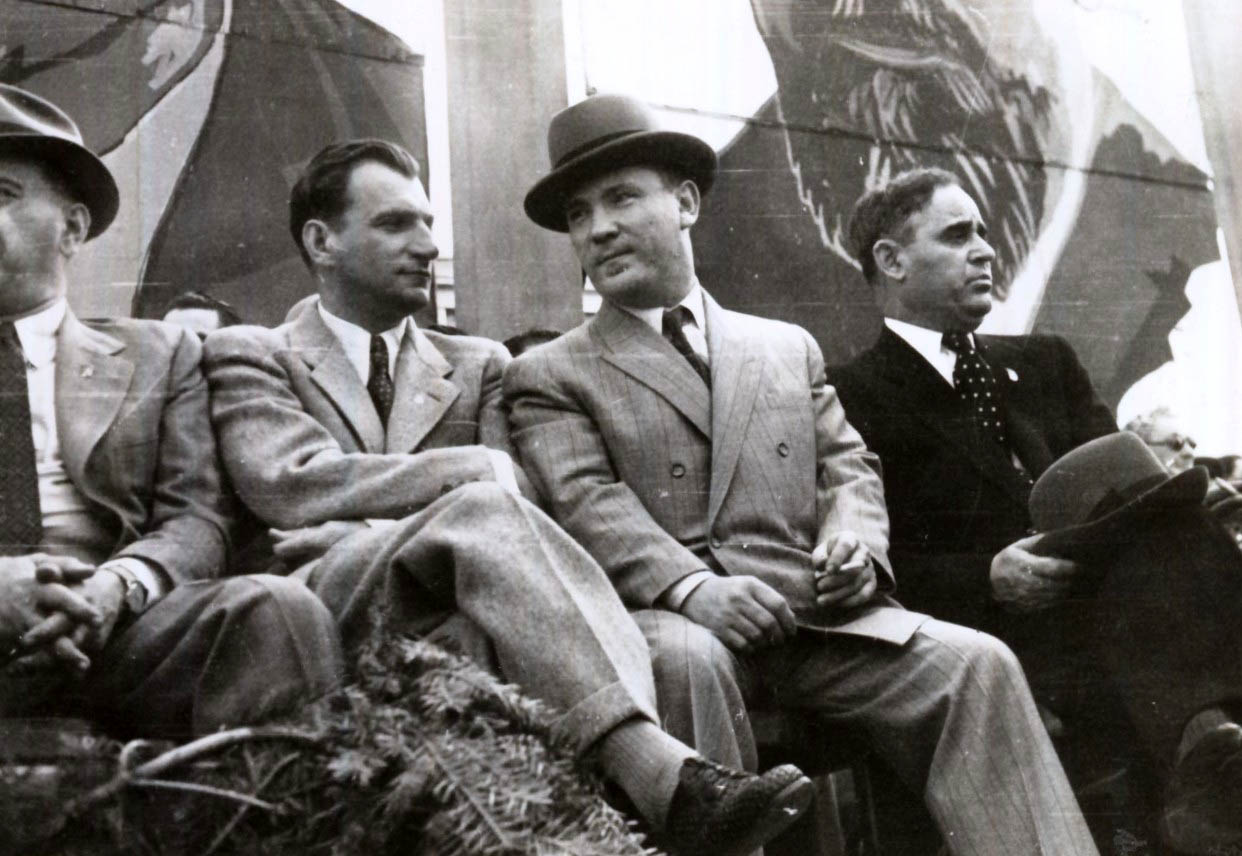
Pătrășcanu, Teohari Georgescu, and Gheorghe Gheorghiu-Dej watching a May Day parade in Bucharest, 1946

Although, overall, Pătrășcanu was argued to have been much less revolutionary-minded than various other PCR ideologues, his original perspective on Marxism remained strongly connected with party doctrine in its most essential points (including his intense advocacy of collectivization, using statistics to point out the existence of a class of chiaburi, the Romanian equivalent of the Soviet kulaks). He showed himself surprised when informed that the Soviet Union had planned a rapid communization of the country, and dismissed Vasile Luca and Pauker's vocal support for the latter policy. Instead, he argued in favor of "making a distinction inside the bourgeoisie", and opening the Communist Party to collaboration with the National Liberal Party. Based on this, he denounced Pauker's agreement with Gheorghe Tătărescu's National Liberal dissidence (the National Liberal Party-Tătărescu, which he called "a gang of con artists, blackmailers, and well-known bribers").

A serious break with the party line occurred in early 1946, when Pătrășcanu decided to take initiative and intervened in the standoff between King Michael I and the Petru Groza executive (an episode colloquially known as greva regală, "the royal strike"); with the help of Lena Constante, he approached the anti-communist figures Victor Rădulescu-Pogoneanu and Grigore Niculescu-Buzești, calling on them to convince the monarch to resume communications with his government.

== 1946 elections ==
During the campaign preceding the rigged elections of 1946, he was actively involved in the PCR's electoral campaign in Transylvania, and, after drought and famine surfaced in several other areas of Romania, he attempted to persuade the peasants of Arad County to sell their wheat harvest to the government, to be used as aid. Received with suspicion, he later reported that he had eventually been able to carry out the task.

Responding to Hungarian-Romanian clashes, Pătrășcanu gave a speech in the city of Cluj, one in which he took a Romanian patriotic/nationalist standpoint against separatist aspirations. It stated:

In the name of the government and of the PCR, I raise my voice against border changes [in connection with the disputed status of newly-recovered Northern Transylvania]. Democratic Romania ensures equal rights to coinhabiting nationalities, but the Magyar population needs to understand that its belonging to the Romanian state is definitive. Nobody has the right to debate our borders.

He ran for the position of deputy in Arad County, and won through various electoral frauds (in Arad's case, forty inspectors nominated by the government had sole control over counting and recording the results).

Pătrășcanu soon received harsh criticism from Gheorghiu-Dej, who branded the views expressed as "chauvinism" and "revisionism". In parallel, the National Peasants' Party, as the main force opposing the PCR, published praises of Pătrășcanu in its paper Dreptatea, until Pătrășcanu met with the editor, Nicolae Carandino, and explained that such articles were harming his image inside the Communist Party. Nevertheless, Pătrășcanu's writings of the time show that, in contrast with his 1928 point of view, he had largely accommodated ‘Leninist’ principles regarding the national issue as well as the Soviet stance regarding Bessarabian topics, although he used more neutral terms than the ones present in official propaganda, and was known to have deplored the unwillingness of the PCR to reduce and refine its internationalist policies.

== Marginalisation ==
In 1946–1947, Pătrășcanu was nevertheless a member of the Tătărescu-headed Romanian delegation to the Paris Peace Conference, and, in fact, one of the signatories of the Peace Treaty with Romania. According to Belu Zilber, during this time, he read Arthur Koestler's Darkness at Noon (a glimpse into forced confessions alluding to the 1936–1937 Moscow Trials, the book was banned throughout the Eastern Bloc). The attitudes he expressed in Paris were considered nationalist by his Soviet overseers, and he himself complained to Gheorghiu-Dej about the party's suspicion surrounding his diplomatic activities.

He was progressively marginalized inside the Party: his texts became subject to censorship and, on public occasions, his name was mentioned after those of less significant politicians. The Communist press virtually ceased referring to Pătrășcanu as "comrade", and used instead the more distant formula "Professor Pătrășcanu", at the same time as Gheorghiu-Dej's speeches on combating internal currents of the Party. The VIth Party Congress in February 1948 did not confirm his Central Committee membership, and in the months following the event, he was removed from government office.

Belu Zilber claimed that having himself been subject to suspicion and marginalisation, he had attempted to warn Pătrășcanu of the change in climate, and had asked him to consider fleeing the Eastern Bloc, only to be stiffly rebuffed. Zilber was eventually arrested in February 1948, on suspicion that he had been a Siguranța Statului agent infiltrating the party.

== Securitate imprisonment and interrogations ==
On 28 April 1948, Pătrășcanu was arrested and came under the investigation of a party committee, comprising the high-ranking Communists Teohari Georgescu, Alexandru Drăghici, and Iosif Rangheț; interrogations were occasionally attended by Gheorghiu-Dej. His file indicates that the secret police (which was soon to become the Securitate) had been keeping him under surveillance from as early as the summer of 1946.

In the fall of 1949, Gheorghiu-Dej (apparently contradicting the committee's conclusions) ordered Pătrășcanu's transfer into the custody of the Secret Service of the Council of Ministers (SSI) under the provisional charge that Pătrășcanu had not reported various political crimes. A report on "Titoism" and collaboration with the maverick Socialist Federal Republic of Yugoslavia was presented to the Cominform: it placed Pătrășcanu, the Hungarian Republic's László Rajk, and Bulgaria's Traicho Kostov in the same camp, as "imperialist agents" (see Tito–Stalin split, Informbiro). The investigation also implicated Remus Koffler, who had been imprisoned in 1944, during the confrontation between Gheorghiu-Dej and Ștefan Foriș.

The day after the SSI began its inquiry, Pătrășcanu attempted suicide by slitting his veins with a smuggled razor blade; upon his recovery, he tried to take his life a second time by swallowing an overdose of sleeping pills.

Immediately after his second suicide attempt, the Pătrășcanu inquiry was transferred to the Interior Ministry, where it was suspended for a six-month period to enable officers to determine a factual basis in the case. When the inquiry resumed in February 1951, Interior Minister Teohari Georgescu ordered that the detainees in the case were not to be physically coerced, in stark contrast to the expressed instructions of the ministry's chief Soviet adviser, Aleksandr Sakharovsky, to do everything necessary to determine the guilt of the accused. In the summer of 1951 Teohari Georgescu, together with his deputies Gheorghe Pintilie and Mișu Dulgheru, reached the conclusion that there was no basis to continue Pătrășcanu's prosecution—and did so while the Soviet advisers were away on their summer vacation. When the advisers returned, they angrily vetoed any closing of the Pătrășcanu inquiry.

It was in 1951 that Pătrășcanu responded to the charges voiced by Gheorghiu-Dej after the Cluj incident, indicating that he had attempted to "answer to the Hungarian revisionist campaign", as well as to aid his party in competing with the appeal of the National Peasants' Party among Romanians in Transylvania (to "take the weapon that was Transylvania away from Maniu supporters' hands"). He also criticized his own advocacy of a PCR alliance with the National Liberal Party.

He was accused of having been financed by "bourgeois" figures during the electoral campaign, and even of having been bought by agents of the United States or of planning, together with Ioan Mocsony Stârcea and Titoist agents, an "imperialist" insurrection in Săvârșin. The latter allegation also surfaced in the parallel investigations of Koffler and Emil Calmanovici.

Serious questions remain on the positions of the various Romanian Communist leaders on the Pătrășcanu case. The matter has not been satisfactorily resolved in the Romanian archives, for the simple reason that all records and transcripts of Politburo and Secretariat discussions on Pătrășcanu were summarily destroyed on Gheorghiu-Dej's orders. In any case, no piece of evidence or confession was obtained by the inquiry until after May 1952, after the purge of Ana Pauker and Teohari Georgescu, who were accused by the Soviet adviser Sakharovskii of having "sabotaged and postponed investigations" in the Pătrășcanu case. The Central Committee plenum that purged them assigned the Pătrășcanu investigation to a team of Securitate officials and their Soviet advisors, directly supervised by Alexandru Drăghici, Alexandru Nicolschi, and Vladimir Mazuru. Under this new team, torture and beating began to be employed in interrogations in the Pătrășcanu case for the first time in the fall of 1952. In time, authorities also alleged that, before 1944, Pătrășcanu, like Zilber, had acted as an agent of Siguranța Statului.

== Trial and execution ==
Pătrășcanu was kept in detention until 1954, when he was executed on 17 April with Koffler at Jilava Prison, near Bucharest, after a show trial overseen by Iosif Chișinevschi. It is possible that he was tortured throughout the questioning conducted on direct orders from the Securitate's Alexandru Drăghici, and there have been rumours that he had one leg amputated before his trial. Researcher Lavinia Betea notes however that, when his and Koffler's body where exhumed in 1968, both their skeletons were complete. Moreover, she concludes that, unlike the case of other defendants, physical violence was never used against Pătrășcanu or his wife. The execution took place in the courtyard of Jilava Prison; Ion Mihai Pacepa claimed in his book, Cartea neagră a Securității, that Pătrășcanu was shot in the back of the head by a Securitate colonel.

In preparation for the procedures, the Securitate took direct inspiration from the Slánský trials in socialist Czechoslovakia (where a team of Romanian officers had been sent to take notes) and, possibly, from the Soviet Trial of the Twenty One (which was allegedly used as template for Calmanovici's fabricated confession).

Pătrășcanu refused to be represented by a lawyer, and even to organize his own defense. Aside from some outbursts against the prosecutors, he stated:

I have nothing to say, except [that I] spit on the charges brought against me.

The actions taken against Pătrășcanu and others signaled the start of a wave of arrests and prison sentences, including that of his wife, as well as those of Harry Brauner, Lena Constante, Petre Pandrea (who was Pătrășcanu's brother-in-law), Herant Torosian, Mocsony Stârcea, Calmanovici, Victoria Sârbu (who had been Ștefan Foriș's lover), and Alexandru Ștefănescu. In preparation for the trial, the Securitate organized interrogations of political detainees or suspects (Gheorghe Tătărescu, who testified against Pătrășcanu and was the target of a sharp rebuke from the latter).

Belu Zilber, the first of the group to give in to Securitate pressures and confess to the charges, was verbally attacked by Pătrășcanu inside the courthouse – Pătrășcanu notably accused him of having invented the entire conspiracy account. Records of their various interrogations show that both he and Calmanovici identified Emil Bodnăraș as the main instigator of their downfall. Reportedly, Zilber had the following opinion of Pătrășcanu: "He was anti-Stalinist and anti-Russian, but for the sake of power he would sign on any Stalinist ineptitude and wickedness. I think his only purpose in life, more than socialism, was to enter history."

== Rehabilitation ==
He was posthumously rehabilitated in April 1968 by Nicolae Ceaușescu, in the latter's attempt to discredit his predecessors and establish his own legitimacy. The main target of this campaign, as indicated by a Central Committee resolution, was Drăghici:

[...] the party leadership has uncovered the anti-party line which Alexandru Drăghici, encouraged by servile, uncultured, and decaying elements, has introduced to the [Securitate] bodies' activities, attempting to remove them from party control and to erect them into supreme bodies standing above party and state leadership, thus causing serious harm to activity in various domains, including that of scientific research.

A party committee which included Ion Popescu-Puțuri investigated the matter of his arrest and interrogation, concluding that evidence against Pătrășcanu was fabricated, that he had been systematically beaten and otherwise ill-treated, and that a confession had been prepared for him to sign. This was coupled with various irregularities in procedures (such as the court having been given only 24 hours to assess evidence from years of investigation, and the death penalty having been decided by the party leadership before being imposed on the panel of judges). Evidence was also presented that some of the false confessions were designed as political weapons in internal party struggles (implicating names of politicians who were not facing trial at the time).

At the Party Plenum in late April 1968, Ceaușescu used Pătrășcanu's case and other ones to single out the negative influence of Drăghici and Iosif Chișinevschi, while also placing suspicion on Emil Bodnăraș and Gheorghe Apostol, who had approved of Pătrășcanu's purge. All of them were required to express "self-criticism", while Gheorghiu-Dej was condemned for having "initiated and overseen" the measures.

Ceaușescu profited on the enduring perception of Lucrețiu Pătrășcanu's activities as patriotic and verging on dissidence, while shadowing his fundamental role in the creation of the new penal system in Romania. In fact, although he was frequently quoted and displayed by the regime, Pătrășcanu's life was usually described in brief and vague sentences. In popular discourse, Pătrășcanu was also largely identified with positive causes, and remained among the most popular Communist figures after the Romanian Revolution of 1989 toppled the regime. Streets in Sector 3 of Bucharest and in Bacău were named after him.

== Sociology ==
=== Overview ===
In his most important volumes (most of which attracted public attention only after 1944), Pătrășcanu combined his commitment to Marxism-Leninism with his sociological training, producing an original outlook on social evolution (focusing on major trends in Romanian society from the time of the Danubian Principalities to his day).

Aside from its support for communist tenets, his work shared many characteristics with the prominent currents of the Romanian sociological school (notably, the attention paid to prevailing social contrasts in a peasant-dominated environment), and made occasional use of material provided by Dimitrie Gusti's comprehensive surveys.

=== On feudalism and serfdom ===
According to Pătrășcanu, Moldavia and Wallachia had forsaken feudalism by the mid 18th century, maintaining instead a form of serfdom which had not been affected by the reforms of Hospodar Constantine Mavrocordatos. He argued that, whereas feudalism was supported by metayage, legislation passed by Mavrocordatos had endorsed and prolonged corvées, a system consecrated in the 1830s by the new Organic Statute. In his view, capitalism had manifested itself mainly as a reactionary force inside Romanian economy during the time of Phanariote rules. Thus, despite characteristic underdevelopment (which he also noted), the local economy had not contrasted with the stages postulated by Marxian economics.

Pătrășcanu contended that the first relevant social conflict had occurred in 1821, at the time of Tudor Vladimirescu's Wallachian uprising. He rejected the notion that, despite Vladimirescu's statements to the contrary, the rebellion had a peasant character, and argued instead that it was evidence of low-ranking boyars and merchants ("the embryo of a class, that was to become the bourgeoisie") attempting to emancipate themselves from Ottoman pressures. In his view, its nationalist character (see Rise of nationalism under the Ottoman Empire) had been manipulated by high-ranking boyars as a measure to dissuade adverse reactions to privileges.

=== On radicalism and reformism ===
The Wallachian Revolution of 1848, the most successful of similar revolts at the time, was, according to Pătrășcanu, a mature reaction of bourgeois circles against boyar supremacy ("it only sought [...] to replace a [privileged] minority with another"), but was generally not opposed to preserving an estate-based economy. He similarly rejected Junimea's traditional criticism of post-1848 realities, indicating that, in its theory of "forms without substance", the group had failed to note that, as a means to preserve several conservative tenets, Westernization in Romania had willingly, and not accidentally, adopted an incomplete form.

In analyzing the history of liberalism and radicalism in Romania, he concluded that many of the most extreme social reformists had rallied in opposition to land reform (he saw this phenomenon as having made possible the toppling of Romania's Domnitor Alexandru Ioan Cuza, whom he saw as a supporter of industrialization). He extended this criticism to socialist groups other than his own, arguing that the prevalent reformism was "the cult of legalism".

These views placed Pătrășcanu in opposition to other left-wing authors in Romania – namely, the influential Poporanists, most of whom had emphasized various contradictions between the Marxian model and local realities, using Junimea's theory as a fundament (aside from Pătrășcanu's own father, these included his contemporary Virgil Madgearu and, to a certain degree, the Marxist Constantin Dobrogeanu-Gherea). In parallel, Pătrășcanu's theories were in sharp contrast with those held by advocates of economic liberalism, and especially with Ștefan Zeletin's.

=== On the 20th century ===
As part of his reflection on post-1900 realities, Pătrășcanu contended that, relatively delayed in comparison to economies of the Western world, Romania had become subject to "primitive accumulation of capital", where the role of colonialism was taken by exploitation of the peasantry. Like Madgearu, he appealed to the works of Rudolf Hilferding, but used them as a basis to argue that foreign capital was being accumulated inside Romania, and only transferred further through a limited number of industries. The Marxist historian Henri H. Stahl has challenged this particular thesis, calling it "highly questionable".

While endorsing some aspects of Dobrogeanu-Gherea's theories regarding the ways in which serfdom was allegedly prolonged, in a discreet form, even after the 20th century, Pătrășcanu challenged his refusal to investigate the effects of capitalism in rural areas. According to Pătrășcanu, the establishment of estate leaseholders, which he viewed as the cause for the 1907 revolt and other, more minor, peasant rebellions, was not a sign of prolonged feudalism, but one of capitalist penetration into agriculture. Contradicting the Social Democratic ideologists Lothar Rădăceanu and Șerban Voinea (whom he accused of having lost contact with the working class), Pătrășcanu theorized that the Romanian petite bourgeoisie was shrinking under pressure from successful capitalists, while rejecting the notion that civil servants belonged to the middle class.

Arguing in favor of a Romanian communist society during the late 1940s, Pătrășcanu indicated a series of essential steps to this goal: after discarding all legislation passed by the Ion Antonescu regime and purging the administrative apparatus, a political amnesty was to be declared, all properties upwards of 50 hectares were to be confiscated, the National Bank passed into state property while trade unions came under government supervision and a new labour code was enforced, and civil liberties were enhanced. Ultimately, a new people's democratic government was to be imposed, removing all forms of antisemitism and chauvinism from public discourse and preserving good relations with the Soviet Union. Polemically, Pătrășcanu theorized that all these steps were "democratic-bourgeois", and not socialist in their essence.

The arguably most influential of Pătrășcanu's writings remains his analysis of the Romanian intelligentsia, part of Probleme de bază ale României. Transcending Leninist rhetoric, the work postulates a characteristic inability of Romanian intellectuals in sacrificing petty politics for the common good, and argues that Romanian elites, while in subservience to the State, have traditionally been attracted to extremism. On one instance in 1945, when theorizing about intellectual déclassés, he proposed their neutralization and systematic supervision.

== Personal life ==
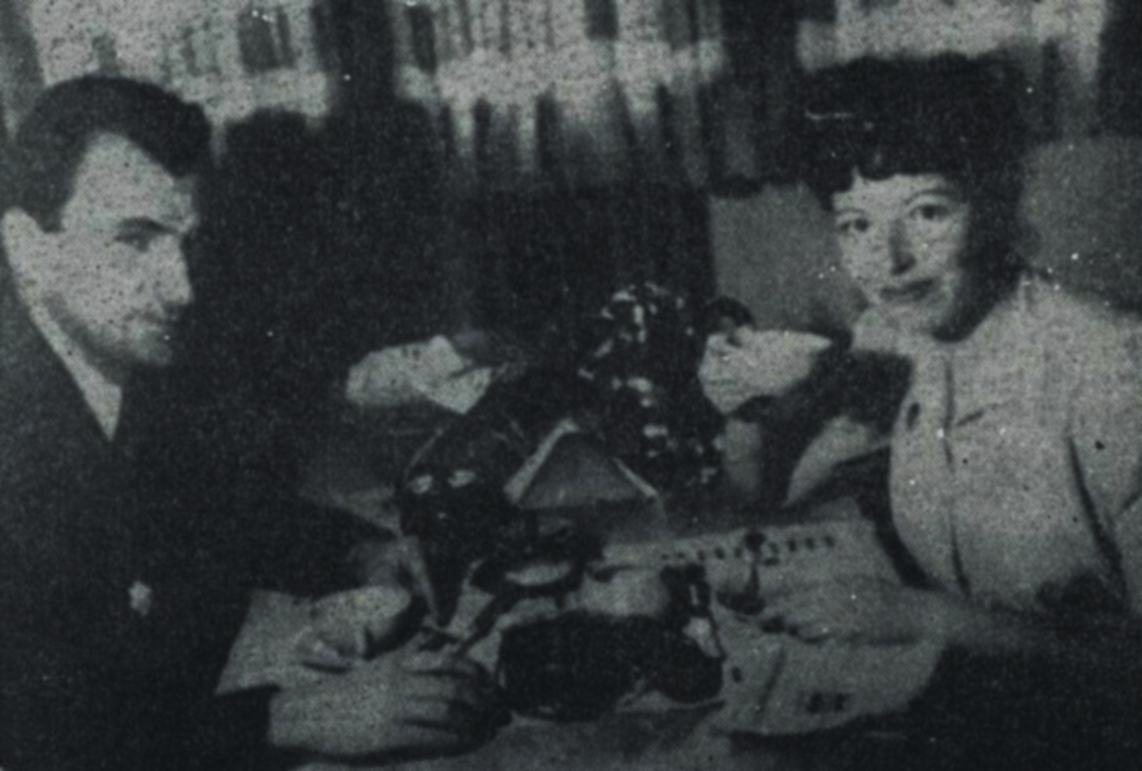
Lucrețiu and Elena Pătrășcanu at their residence on Vasile Lascăr Street in Bucharest, 1945

Lucrețiu Pătrășcanu was married to Elena, born Herta Schwamen, who had a career as a stage designer (employed, with Lena Constante, by the Țăndărică Theater in Bucharest). Elena, who was Jewish, avoided the first wave of official antisemitic persecutions at the end of the 1930s (under the Octavian Goga government) by converting to the Romanian Orthodox Church (she was baptized by the socialist sympathiser Gala Galaction).

Elena Pătrășcanu was also a party activist, and was instrumental in maintaining links between her husband and other Communist leaders during the early stages of World War II. Implicated in the trial and forced to testify against Lucrețiu Pătrășcanu, she was given eight years in prison. She spent over a year of that sentence at Dumbrăveni Prison, together with Victoria Sârbu and Lena Constante.

The Pătrășcanus had no children.

== In art ==
Titus Popovici's play Puterea și adevărul ("The Power and the Truth"), published in the early 1970s (staged by Liviu Ciulei and filmed, in 1971, by Manole Marcus), centers on the character Petrescu, largely based on Pătrășcanu, who is persecuted by the party secretary Pavel Stoian (a disguised reference to Gheorghiu-Dej), while living to see his hopes for a better future fulfilled by Mihai Duma (standing for Ceaușescu). For a while after its publication, Puterea și adevărul was translated into several languages and used as official propaganda in cultural contacts with the outside world.

In his 1993 film The Mirror (Începutul adevărului, also known as Oglinda), Sergiu Nicolaescu cast Șerban Ionescu as Pătrășcanu.

== Published volumes ==
- Un veac de frământări sociale, 1821–1907 (A Century of Social Unrest, 1821–1907)
- Probleme de bază ale României (Fundamental Problems of Romania)
- Sub trei dictaturi (Under Three Dictatorships)
- Curente și tendințe în filozofia românească (Schools of Thought and Tendencies in Romanian Philosophy)
