= Lena Constante =

Romanian artist, essayist and memoirist (1909–2005)

- Born: June 18, 1909; Bucharest, Kingdom of Romania
- Died: November 2, 2005 (aged 96)
- Education: Romanian Art Academy
- Occupations: Artist, essayist, memoirist
- Spouse: Harry Brauner

Lena Constante (June 18, 1909 – November 2, 2005) was a Romanian artist, essayist, and memoirist, known for her work in stage design and tapestry. A family friend of Communist Party politician Lucrețiu Pătrășcanu, she was arrested by the Communist regime following the conflict between Pătrășcanu and Gheorghe Gheorghiu-Dej. She was indicted in his trial and spent twelve years as a political prisoner.

Constante was the wife of the musicologist Harry Brauner, and the sister-in-law of the painter Victor Brauner.

== Biography ==
Born in Bucharest, she was the daughter of an Aromanian journalist (Constantin Constante, who had immigrated from Macedonia) and his Romanian wife. The Constante family left the city during the World War I German occupation, and Lena spent much of her childhood in Iași, Kherson, Odessa, London, and Paris.

Returning at the end of the conflict, she studied painting at the Romanian Art Academy in Bucharest, and established friendships with leading intellectuals of her time, including Brauner, Mircea Vulcănescu, Petru Comarnescu, Henri H. Stahl, Mihail Sebastian, and Paul Sterian. During the period, she became sympathetic to left-wing politics and joined the sociological project initiated by Dimitrie Gusti, aiding in the creation of comprehensive monographs on traditional Romanian society; her visits to various villages acquainted her with traditional folk art, especially religious icons, which she later used as inspiration in her work.

Constante first exhibited her art in 1934, and had personal shows in 1935, and 1946; her last exhibit before being arrested occurred in Ankara, Turkey (1947).

After 1945, she was employed as a stage designer by the newly founded Țăndărică Theater, where she met Elena Pătrășcanu, Lucrețiu's wife. In early 1946, when Pătrăşcanu, who was Romania's Minister of Justice, decided to go against the will of his party and intervened in the standoff between King Michael I and the Petru Groza executive (greva regală – "the royal strike"), she mediated between him and two well-known anti-communist figures Victor Rădulescu-Pogoneanu and Grigore Niculescu-Buzești, in an attempt to ensure their support for a political compromise.

Together with her friend Brauner, as well as Remus Koffler, Belu Zilber, Petre Pandrea, Herant Torosian, Ioan Mocsony-Stârcea, the engineer Emil Calmanovici, Alexandru Ștefănescu, and others, she was implicated in Pătrășcanu's 1954 trial, being sentenced to twelve years in prison. The person who took initiative in bringing her to trial was Securitate deputy chief Alexandru Nicolschi.

During repeated interrogations by the Securitate, Constante tried to fend off false accusations of "Titoism" and "treason", but, the victim of constant beatings and torture (much of her hair was torn from the roots), and confronted with Zilber's testimony — which implicated her —, she eventually gave in and admitted to the charges.

Throughout the rest of her life, she maintained a highly critical view of Zilber, and expressed her admiration for Pătrășcanu, who had for long resisted pressures and had been executed in the end. As she stated in 2004,

"I did not know [Lucrețiu Pătrășcanu] too well. It was not [because of] him that I went to jail. Neither was it [because of] Mrs. Elena [Pătrășcanu]. His friend, Belu Zilber, made us go to jail, me and my husband. Zilber was never pleased with all the things he kept inventing in his confessions and he would concoct some stuff that aimed to please the interrogators. To please [Gheorghiu-]Dej."

For much of her time in prison, Constante was kept in virtually complete solitude, a special regime which she later attributed to her earlier refusal to confess. Repeatedly beaten and again tortured during her stay in special prisons for women, she much later confessed that she was never able to forgive the people responsible for her plight. She was freed in 1962; in 1963, she married Brauner, who had also been released. They both were rehabilitated during Nicolae Ceauşescu's campaign of reviewing Romania's history under Gheorghiu-Dej (1968).

Constante exhibited her works on two other occasions (in 1970 and 1971, both centered on tapestry and collage art).

In 1990, after the Romanian Revolution, she published her French-language autobiography L'évasion silencieuse ("The Silent Escape"), at the Éditions La Découverte in Paris. The volume, which Vladimir Tismăneanu has compared to the works of Margarete Buber-Neumann, is written as a diary, and makes use of her prolific memory, which allowed her to record an immense succession of days, years after events had passed. It won the Prize of French-Language Writers' Association, and was translated into English as The Silent Escape: Three Thousand Days in Romanian Prisons, with a preface by Gail Kligman; the Romanian version (Evadarea tăcută) received the Romanian Academy's Lucian Blaga Prize. In 1993, she also published Evadarea imposibilă. Penitenciarul politic de femei Miercurea Ciuc 1957–1961 ("The Impossible Escape. The Political Prison for Women in Miercurea Ciuc 1957–1961").

In 1997, Constante starred as herself in Nebunia Capetelor, a film by Thomas Ciulei based on The Silent Escape; Ciulei had originally intended to cast Maia Morgenstern as Constante, but ultimately decided to pay a special tribute to the book's theme ("I wanted to force the spectator to build himself an imaginary space, as Lena Constante had done when she was in her cell").

She died on November 2, 2005.
