= Antonescu =

Antonescu is a common family name in Romania derived from the root name, Antonius. Persons named Antonescu include:

- Ion Antonescu (1882-1946), Romanian politician and military officer, Conducător during World War II
- Crin Antonescu (1959), Romanian politician, Minister of Youth and Sports, President of the Senate
- Mihai Antonescu (1904-1946), Romanian politician, Minister of Foreign Affairs of Romania during World War II
- Dumitru Antonescu (1945-2016), Romanian footballer
- Maria Antonescu (1892-1964), Romanian socialite, wife of Ion Antonescu
- Petre Antonescu (1873-1965), Romanian architect
- Petre Antonescu (1891-1957), Romanian soldier
- Victor Antonescu (1871-1947), Romanian politician
- Victor Antonescu (1936), Romanian film director
