= Emil Calmanovici =

Romanian engineer, businessman (1896 - 1956)

Emil Calmanovici (March 1896 – March 12, 1956) was a Romanian engineer, businessman, and communist militant. Known for the financial support he gave to the Romanian Communist Party (PCR) during the late 1930s and early 1940s, he became a political prisoner of the Communist regime after being implicated in the show trial of his collaborator Lucrețiu Pătrășcanu. Calmanovici died in mysterious circumstances in Aiud Prison, while on recovery from a hunger strike.

== Biography ==
=== Early life and financial success ===
Born to a Jewish family in Piatra Neamț, he was the son of Mendel and his wife Ana, who ran a business in the town. A graduate of the Ludwig-Maximilians-Universität München and the University of Berlin, where he was confronted with the establishment of the Nazi regime and became an avid reader of Karl Marx and Vladimir Lenin, he also amassed a fortune in his youth, owing to his real estate investments. Calmanovici decided to dedicate his wealth to the PCR cause, at a time when the party was outlawed.

By the end of World War II, when they were nationalized, his properties included two construction enterprises, additional shares in a logging company centered in his native town, seven apartments, and over 18,000 m^{2} in Bucharest real estate.

=== Party financier ===
According to Calmanovici's statements, he had contributed massive sums to various PCR enterprises between 1937 (the year when he joined the group) and 1944, being responsible for the purchase of a printing press, the renovation of the Central Committee seat in Bucharest, a clandestine radio station, and a kindergarten for children of party members. He estimated that his investments totaled 30 million lei in 1942 currency, which he argued was over 75% of his total income. Calmanovici took pride in noting that this contribution was by far the highest of all those recorded (including that of Jacques Berman). In addition, he contended, nationalization of his wealth had brought the state over 1 billion lei in 1947 currency.

Inside the PCR, he kept only sporadic contacts with the "prison faction", a group led by Gheorghe Gheorghiu-Dej (according to one account, during the time when Gheorghiu-Dej was held in Doftana prison, Calmanovici sent him a jacket as a gift). Instead, he was close to Pătrășcanu's maverick group (later known as the "Secretariat faction"), a fact which, in time, contributed to his arrest and imprisonment (both of which were instigated by members of the "prison faction").

=== Late 1940s ===
During the war, when Romania joined the Axis powers and participated in Operation Barbarossa, Calmanovici was among those charged with establishing contacts between the Communists and other opposition groups. At the time, his relation with the pro-Allied financier Alexandru Ștefănescu helped him gain intimate knowledge of various negotiations between the National Peasants' Party (PNȚ) and the National Liberal Party (PNL) on one side and Ion Antonescu's dictatorial government on the other, as well as of the latter's tentative moves to withdraw Romania from its alliance with Nazi Germany through a compromise with the Western Allies (the 1943 unsuccessful mission of Barbu Ştirbey to Cairo). Calmanovici forwarded his information to the PCR's Remus Koffler, which helped the group approach and influence the PNȚ leader Iuliu Maniu to form an alliance against Antonescu (one which enlisted support from the Soviet Union).

After the fall of Antonescu's regime and the onset of Soviet occupation in August 1944, when the PCR first entered government, Calmanovici became an esteemed party member and officially endorsed industrialist. In the spring of 1945, his Bucharest house served as a meeting place for PCR and pro-Communist forces who planned and succeeded in toppling Prime Minister Nicolae Rădescu (after a series of street clashes, Rădescu was replaced with the Ploughmen's Front leader Petru Groza, whose cabinet was controlled by the PCR). Following this, he was appointed a technical director of the Bucharest Constructions Institute and was involved in enforcing Soviet standards and expertise.

=== Arrest ===
Relations between Calmanovici and the PCR degenerated abruptly toward the end of the 1940s, and he was arrested by the Securitate on May 26, 1951. Several days earlier, Calmanovici had met with Constantin Pîrvulescu. At this meeting, Calmanovici asked Pîrvulescu to use his status as head of the Party Control Commission to grant him a decoration (Calmanovici was stiffly refused, on the grounds that such self-promotion was unprecedented).

Documents involving the 1943–1944 contacts between Calmanovici, Pătrășcanu, Koffler, and Maniu (who was already imprisoned on such charges following the Tămădău Affair) were interpreted as evidence that the former two had been spying for the Western Allies. In full, the accusation read: "as an agent of the English espionage services he forwarded information about the PCR, taking part in the criminal action to destroy the party and support the anti-Soviet war".

Calmanovici stated that, early on, authorities had presented him with the claim that he was kept in custody in order to aid in the process of compiling a history of the PCR. Starting in summer 1951, he was subject to a series of Securitate interrogations, which concluded that he had not contributed to hostile activities and that he was able to support his case with "sufficient guarantees".

In December, Calmanovici, who had devoted his spare time to learning Russian, was supposed to be released from custody. Instead, his case was reviewed by a new group of Securitate officials, who obeyed Gheorghiu-Dej and alleged that the latter's rival, Minister of the Interior Teohari Georgescu, was not enforcing party doctrine (Georgescu was to be himself ousted in 1952). On orders from Alexandru Drăghici and Vladimir Mazuru, under the supervision of several Soviet envoys, Securitate cadres were to induce Calmanovici to confess having spied in Romania during and after the World War. The officer who had originally argued in favor of his release was criticized for having displayed "lack of vigilance", and ordered to resume interrogation.

In several appeals to the PCR leadership (Gheorghiu-Dej, Pîrvulescu, Chivu Stoica, Emil Bodnăraș and others) Calmanovici repeatedly stated his innocence and dismissed accusations that he was a bourgeois figure with insufficient political education. In another personal letter, he compared allegations of espionage with those made by Alexander Kerensky about Vladimir Lenin prior to the October Revolution in Russia.

=== Confession and trial ===
In February 1953, Calmanovici gave in to Securitate violence and presented operatives with a fabricated account, stating that he had been part of a network of spies presided over by Milton (a name he came up with after recalling the 17th-century poet John Milton). His inquisitors soon rejected the story, and argued that it was additional proof of "provocation" on Calmanovici's part.

Eventually, he agreed to sign his name to a confession drawn up by the PCR, in return for a promise that he was to be given at most a four-year sentence. It has been argued that the document endorsed by Calmanovici was directly inspired from the similar one handed over by Nikolai Bukharin during the 1938 Moscow Trial of the Twenty One. In its final form, it also incriminated Calmanovici of Zionism and spying in favor of the Western Allies (the United States, or, alternatively, the United Kingdom).

Consequently, Calmanovici was indicted in Pătrășcanu's 1954 trial, where, despite early promises, the court ultimately sentenced him to life imprisonment and forced labor. The sentence was given on counts of crime against peace and high treason. As Pătrășcanu and Koffler were being swiftly executed at Jilava Prison, he and the other persons sentenced (including Alexandru Ștefănescu, Petre Pandrea, Harry Brauner, Lena Constante, and Pătrășcanu's wife, Elena) were dispatched to the infamous Aiud Prison, on their way to various facilities.

=== Imprisonment and death ===
Calmanovici, who was kept in almost complete isolation, managed to contact other inmates, an infraction which was added to his criminal record.

As a consequence, the Securitate decided to stage a set of circumstances which were to incriminate him further: in 1955, Calmanovici was escorted out of Aiud and into a villa in Săftica, where he received a humane treatment while being interrogated by Vasile Posteucă. A guard was instructed to approach him and earn his confidence, to the point where Calmanovici trusted him with carrying out a message he had written on linens; addressed to his former employees and meant to be forwarded to Jewish communists in the Western world, these exposed the fallacies and major irregularities of his trial. (In similar appeals, Calmanovici had also meant to bring his case to the attention of the Cominform.) After the guard handed the letters over to his superiors, Calmanovici was chained and moved back to Aiud.

He decided to publicize his innocence by beginning a hunger strike, which eventually led physicians on duty to force-feed him. His diet at the time went against medical guidelines for people with malnutrition, and was the most likely cause of his death by gastrointestinal perforation — two prison staff members later attested that this was done on purpose, as a method of assassination. It has also been noted that Calmanovici's signed statement according to which he was abandoning the hunger strike and was accepting the treatment, extracted only hours before his death, was immediately communicated to higher authority (unlike any other such statement of the time).

Of his group, Calmanovici was the only one to die in custody (all others were released c. 1964, when they benefited from an amnesty).

== Rehabilitation and legacy ==
Like all defendants in the Pătrășcanu trial, Calmanovici was rehabilitated in April 1968 by Nicolae Ceaușescu, following a change in policy which was meant to discredit his deceased predecessor, Gheorghiu-Dej, and the former Securitate chief, Alexandru Drăghici.

The new inquiry, overseen by Ion Popescu-Puțuri, found that Calmanovici had been the victim of systematic abuse. Among others, it was established that Calmanovici's arrest had been operated on the basis of Gheorghiu-Dej's personal views, that the charges had for long not been communicated to Calmanovici, that Soviet agents had openly intervened in interrogations, and that, like virtually all other defendants, he had been repeatedly beaten and otherwise tortured to ensure a forced confession.

Calmanovici's son became a resident and later a citizen of Sweden, becoming known under the name Gad Calmgran. He worked as a journalist, and was a collaborator for the newspaper Dagens Nyheter.

== See also ==
- List of unsolved deaths
