= Belu Zilber =

Romanian communist activist

Belu Zilber (born Herbert Zilber; October 14, 1901–February 1978) was a Romanian communist activist.

Born into a Jewish family in Târgu Frumos, Iași County, he adhered to the Bolshevik movement while still an adolescent. Because he participated in the typographers' demonstration of December 13, 1918, he was expelled from every educational institution in his native country by the authorities of the Kingdom of Romania. He continued his high school education in Paris and began but did not complete studies at the polytechnic division of the University of Grenoble. He returned to Romania in 1922 and was hired as an expert at the War Ministry. In 1928, he was recruited as a Soviet spy in Vienna by David Fabian, and became a member of the Victor Aradi spy ring. Arrested in Romania in December 1930, Zilber agreed to become an informant for the Siguranța secret police. At his trial for espionage on the Soviets' behalf, he was initially sentenced to five years at hard labor. After spending time at Doftana Prison and at labor camps in Caransebeș and Târgu Jiu (where he got close to Gheorghe Gheorghiu-Dej's group), he was retried and acquitted in 1932.

That year, he began working at an institute led by Virgil Madgearu, where he remained until 1947. During the rest of the 1930s, Zilber, characterized as "cultured, voluble and ubiquitous", and known in the cultural circles of Bucharest, led an underground life as a member of the banned Romanian Communist Party working to destroy "bourgeois democracy", an informer and a spy, but also lived the seemingly normal life of a bourgeois desirous of prosperity. On August 23, 1944, he was an active participant in the Royal coup d'état, when he helped draft King Michael's address to the nation, announcing the fall of the Ion Antonescu regime and Romania's switch from the Axis to the Allies. In the immediate aftermath of the coup, the Communist Party was made legal and he became the closest collaborator of his friend Lucrețiu Pătrășcanu, who was appointed Justice Minister. Zilber became a professor of political economy at the University of Bucharest and received a Ph.D. in philosophy. During that time, he married Nuțu Fuxman (Ana Naum). In the fall of 1945, Zilber entered in contact with Mark Ethridge, a journalist appointed by President Harry S. Truman to serve on a mission to study whether to grant diplomatic recognition to Bulgaria and Romania. Zilber told Ethridge that the Romanian government, led by Petru Groza, was controlled by Moscow, and proposed a government led by Pătrășcanu. According to US Intelligence reports from that time, Zilber (a prominent Communist) became the advocate for a strong American resistance against the Soviet occupation of Romania, insistently urging the United States to support free trade, free elections, and a free press in Eastern Europe.

From August to November 1946, Zilber was in Paris as part of the Romanian delegation to the Paris Peace Conference. On May 20, 1947, Scînteia announced that he had been expelled from the Communist Party, and in the fall of that year he was forbidden from teaching at the university, on orders from the Education Minister, Ștefan Voitec. Zilber was arrested in February 1948, two months before Pătrășcanu. During interrogation, after being subjected for months to horrible torture, he gave in to Securitate pressures and confessed to the charges, implicating Pătrășcanu in some delusional scenarios of conspiracy and treason. Following a show trial, he was sentenced to life imprisonment on April 14, 1954, but was released in 1964. He died in 1978. Following incineration at the Cenușa crematorium, his ashes were taken to Cișmigiu Gardens, where they were scattered under a bush near the bust of George Panu, among the magnolias he often admired. His memoirs appeared posthumously in 1997, some years after the 1989 fall of the regime.
