= Elena Pătrășcanu =

Romanian stage designer

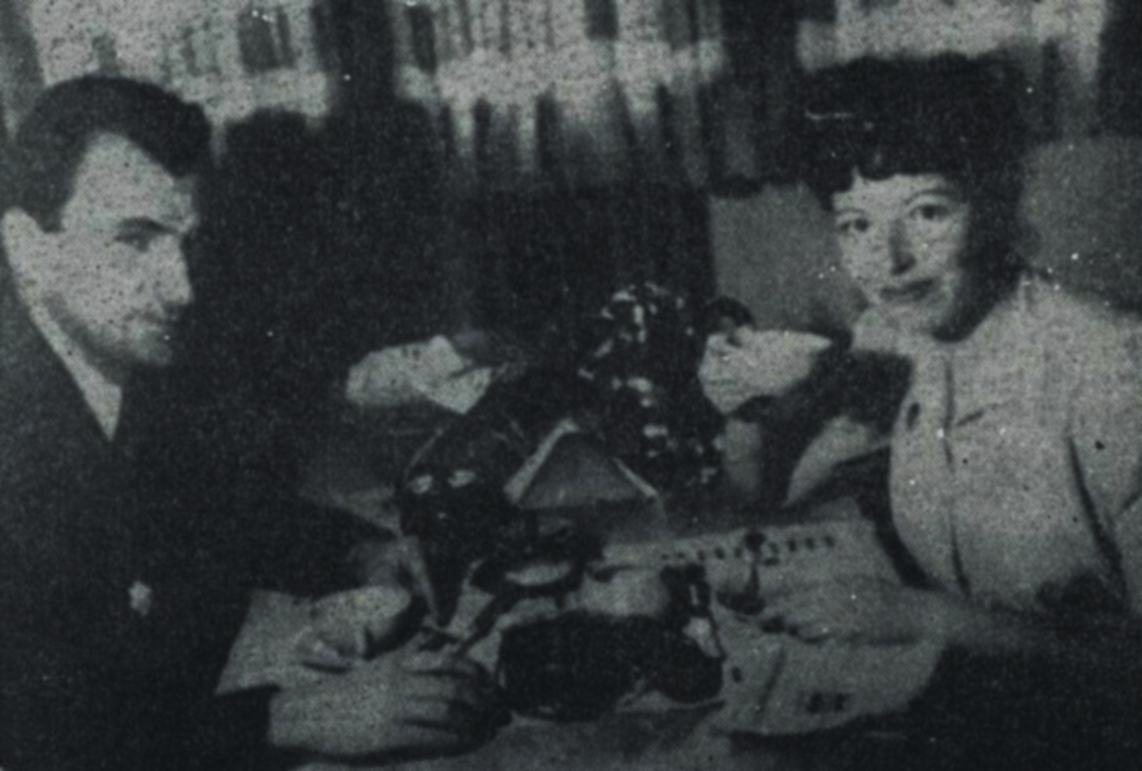
- Elena Pătrășcanu with her husband, Lucrețiu Pătrășcanu, in 1945
- Born: Hertha Schwamen; April 12, 1914; Czernowitz, Duchy of Bukovina, Austria-Hungary
- Died: May 5, 2000 (aged 86); Bucharest, Romania
- Other name: Elena Pătrășcanu Veakis
- Education: Academy of Fine Arts Vienna
- Occupations: stage designer, actress, puppeteer, propagandist, politician
- Known for: wife of Lucrețiu Pătrășcanu co-founder of the Țăndărică Puppet Theatre
- Political party: Romanian Communist Party (before 1948)
- Other political affiliations: Union of Patriots
- Criminal charges: complicity in the destruction of the Romanian Communist Party and the country
- Criminal penalty: sentenced to 14 years of forced labor, 5 years of civic degradation and the confiscation of all property
- Criminal status: Released after 2 years. Rehabilitated in 1968
- Spouse(s): Lucrețiu Pătrășcanu (m. 1939, died 1954); Yannis Veakis

Elena Pătrășcanu (born Hertha Schwamen; 12 April 1914, Czernowitz, Duchy of Bukovina, Austria-Hungary – 5 May 2000, Bucharest, Romania) was a Romanian stage designer, co-founder of the Țăndărică Puppet Theatre, and a former political prisoner during the communist period. She was the wife of communist leader Lucrețiu Pătrășcanu, whose arrest and execution deeply influenced the trajectory of her own life.

== Early life and education ==
Born in Czernowitz, Bukovina (now Chernivtsi, Ukraine), to a Jewish family, as Hertha Schwamen, she studied scenography in Vienna, where she trained as an architect-scenographer. During the 1930s, while completing her studies, she embraced Marxist ideas and joined the Communist Party of Romania.

== Marriage to Lucrețiu Pătrășcanu ==
After returning to Romania, Schwamen was saved from imprisonment for communist activism by the lawyer and party activist Lucrețiu Pătrășcanu, whom she later married in 1939. She converted to the Orthodox faith and was baptized by the left-wing writer and priest Gala Galaction, taking the name Elena.

== Political and cultural activity ==
Elena Pătrășcanu became active within the cultural and propaganda structures of the Romanian Communist Party (PCR). She served in the Agitation and Propaganda Section of the party's Bucharest branch and was a member of the advisory council attached to the Ministry of Propaganda. Within the Union of Patriots she acted as a leader of its artistic group.

She was also one of the founders of the Țăndărică Puppet Theatre, established in 1945. She dedicated herself to organizing and developing the institution until her arrest in 1948.

== Arrest and imprisonment ==
On 28 April 1948, shortly after the arrest of her husband, Elena Pătrășcanu was detained and accused of “complicity in the destruction of the Romanian Communist Party and the country.” During the investigation she was subjected to intense physical and psychological pressure, as well as torture. Because of these, she acknowledged that her husband did not believe in the guilt of Soviet leaders Grigori Zinoviev, Lev Kamenev, and Nikolai Bukharin, who had been condemned by Joseph Stalin — a statement interpreted as aiding in the exposure of a “traitor.”

Following Lucrețiu Pătrășcanu's execution, she was sentenced in April 1954 to 14 years of forced labor, five years of civic degradation, and the confiscation of all personal property. She was released in March 1956 under a decree of amnesty, at which time she was officially informed of her husband's death in prison.

== Later life ==
After her release, she remarried. Her second husband was the Greek communist theatre director Yannis Veakis, a political refugee in Romania, taking the name Elena Pătrășcanu Veakis.

The re-evaluation of the Pătrășcanu case in 1968 led to her full rehabilitation.

In a 1982 interview with Eleonora Cofas of the Museum of the History of Bucharest, Elena Pătrășcanu Veakis recounted in detail the founding of the Țăndărică Theatre and the challenges she faced in establishing and maintaining the institution during the difficult years following World War II.

== Death ==
Elena Pătrășcanu died on 5 May 2000 in Bucharest.
