= List of heads of state of Romania =

This is a list consisting of all the heads of state of modern and contemporary Romania, since the establishment of the United Principalities of Moldavia and Wallachia in 1859 to the present day.

The incumbent head of state, as of 20 November 2026, is President Nicușor Dan.

== United Principalities (1859–1881) ==
Denotes Regent

Domnitor				Reign			Claim
No.	Portrait	Name (Birth–Death)	House	Reign start	Reign end	Duration	Claim
1		Alexandru Ioan Cuza (1820–1873)	Cuza	24 January 1859	22 February 1866 (Abdicated)	7 years, 29 days	Previously ruled as Prince of Wallachia and Moldavia (in a personal union from 1859 until official unification in 1862)
—		Lascăr Catargiu (1823–1899)	—	22 February 1866	20 April 1866	57 days	Princely Lieutenancy
—		General; Nicolae Golescu (1810–1877)	—	22 February 1866	20 April 1866	57 days	Princely Lieutenancy
—		Colonel; Nicolae Haralambie (1835–1908)	—	22 February 1866	20 April 1866	57 days	Princely Lieutenancy
2		Carol I (1839–1914)	Hohenzollern-Sigmaringen	20 April 1866	15 March 1881	14 years, 329 days	1866 Referendum

== Kingdom of Romania (1881–1947) ==
Denotes Regent
Denotes Conducător

King				Reign			Claim
No.	Portrait	Name (Birth–Death)	House	Reign start	Reign end	Time in office	Claim
(2)		Carol I (1839–1914)	Hohenzollern-Sigmaringen	15 March 1881	10 October 1914	33 years, 209 days	Previously ruled as Domnitor
3		Ferdinand I (1865–1927)	Hohenzollern-Sigmaringen	10 October 1914	20 July 1927	12 years, 283 days	Nephew of Carol I
4		Michael I (1921–2017)	Hohenzollern-Sigmaringen	20 July 1927	8 June 1930 (Deposed)	2 years, 323 days	Grandson of Ferdinand I
—		Prince Nicholas (1903–1978)	Hohenzollern-Sigmaringen	20 July 1927	8 June 1930 (Resigned)	2 years, 323 days	Regency Council; For Michael I
—		Patriarch; Miron Cristea (1868–1939)	—	20 July 1927	8 June 1930 (Resigned)	2 years, 323 days	Regency Council; For Michael I
—		Gheorghe Buzdugan (1867–1929)	—	20 July 1927	7 October 1929 (Died)	2 years, 79 days	Regency Council; For Michael I
—		Constantin Sărățeanu (1862–1935)	—	9 October 1929	8 June 1930 (Resigned)	242 days	Regency Council; For Michael I
5		Carol II (1893–1953)	Hohenzollern-Sigmaringen	8 June 1930	6 September 1940 (Abdicated)	10 years, 90 days	Son of Ferdinand I
(4)		Michael I (1921–2017)	Hohenzollern-Sigmaringen	6 September 1940	30 December 1947 (Abdicated)	7 years, 115 days	Son of Carol II
—		Marshal; Ion Antonescu (1882–1946)	—	6 September 1940	23 August 1944 (Deposed)	3 years, 352 days	Conducător; With Michael I

== Romanian People's Republic (1947–1965) / Socialist Republic of Romania (1965–1989) ==
Title

- 1947–1948: President of the Provisional Presidium of the Republic
- 1948–1961: President of the Presidium of the Great National Assembly
- 1961–1989: President of the State Council (Note: Ex officio from 28 March 1974.)
- 1974–1989: President of Romania

Status

Denotes acting Head of State

No.	Portrait	Name (Birth–Death)	Term of office			Election	Political party	Position(s)
No.	Portrait	Name (Birth–Death)	Took office	Left office	Time in office	Election	Political party	Position(s)
6		Constantin Ion Parhon (1874–1969)	30 December 1947	13 April 1948	105 days	1947	PMR	President of the Provisional Presidium of the Republic
6		Constantin Ion Parhon (1874–1969)	13 April 1948	12 June 1952	4 years, 60 days	1948	PMR	President of the Presidium of the Great National Assembly
7		Petru Groza (1884–1958)	12 June 1952	7 January 1958 (Died)	5 years, 209 days	1952	FP (1952–1953) Independent (1953–1958)	President of the Presidium of the Great National Assembly
(7)		Petru Groza (1884–1958)	12 June 1952	7 January 1958 (Died)	5 years, 209 days	1952	FP (1952–1953) Independent (1953–1958)	President of the Presidium of the Great National Assembly
—		Mihail Sadoveanu (1880–1961)	7 January 1958	11 January 1958	4 days	—	PMR	Acting presidents of the Presidium of the Great National Assembly
—		Anton Moisescu (1913–2002)	7 January 1958	11 January 1958	4 days	—	PMR	Acting presidents of the Presidium of the Great National Assembly
8		Ion Gheorghe Maurer (1902–2000)	11 January 1958	21 March 1961	3 years, 69 days	1958	PMR	President of the Presidium of the Great National Assembly
9		Gheorghe Gheorghiu-Dej (1901–1965)	21 March 1961	19 March 1965 (Died)	3 years, 363 days	1961	PMR	President of the State Council
—		Ion Gheorghe Maurer (1902–2000)	19 March 1965	24 March 1965	5 days	—	PMR	Acting presidents of the State Council
—		Ștefan Voitec (1900–1984)	19 March 1965	24 March 1965	5 days	—	PMR	Acting presidents of the State Council
—		Avram Bunaciu (1909–1983)	19 March 1965	24 March 1965	5 days	—	PMR	Acting presidents of the State Council
10		Chivu Stoica (1908–1975)	24 March 1965	9 December 1967 (Resigned)	2 years, 260 days	1965	PMR PCR	President of the State Council
11		Nicolae Ceaușescu (1918–1989)	9 December 1967	22 December 1989	22 years, 13 days	1967	PCR	President of the State Council
11		Nicolae Ceaușescu (1918–1989)	28 March 1974	22 December 1989 (Deposed)	22 years, 13 days	1974; 1980; 1985	PCR	President of Romania

=== General Secretary of the Romanian Workers' Party / Romanian Communist Party ===
Portrait	Name (Birth–Death)	Term of office			Position(s)
Portrait	Name (Birth–Death)	Took office	Left office	Time in office	Position(s)
	Gheorghe Gheorghiu-Dej (1901–1965)	16 October 1945	19 April 1954	8 years, 185 days	General Secretary of the Romanian Communist Party
	Gheorghe Gheorghiu-Dej (1901–1965)	21 February 1948	19 April 1954	8 years, 185 days	General Secretary of the Romanian Workers' Party
	Gheorghe Apostol (1913–2010)	19 April 1954	30 September 1955	1 year, 164 days	First Secretary of the Romanian Workers' Party
	Gheorghe Gheorghiu-Dej (1901–1965)	30 September 1955	19 March 1965 (Died)	9 years, 170 days	First Secretary of the Romanian Workers' Party
	Nicolae Ceaușescu (1918–1989)	22 March 1965	22 December 1989 (Deposed)	24 years, 275 days	First Secretary of the Romanian Workers' Party
	Nicolae Ceaușescu (1918–1989)	24 July 1965	22 December 1989 (Deposed)	24 years, 275 days	General Secretary of the Romanian Communist Party

== Romania (1989–present) ==
The Constitution of Romania prohibits the President to be a member of any political party while in office. The parties listed below represent the political affiliation before the 1991 Constitution was adopted and the party affiliation of the ad interim (i.e. acting) presidents, for whom such a restriction is not explicitly stipulated in the law.

Title

- 1989 : Council of the National Salvation Front (collective)
- 1989–1990: President of the Council of the National Salvation Front
- 1990 : President of the Provisional National Unity Council
- 1990–present: President of Romania

Status

Denotes ad interim (i.e. acting) President

No.	Portrait	Name (Birth–Death)	Term of office			Election	Political party	Government(s) (Term)	Position(s)
No.	Portrait	Name (Birth–Death)	Took office	Left office	Time in office	Election	Political party	Government(s) (Term)	Position(s)
—		Council of the National Salvation Front Spokesman: Ion Iliescu	22 December 1989	26 December 1989	4 days	—	FSN	Itself (1989)	Collective Head of State
—		Ion Iliescu (1930–2025) (Note: Iliescu served as President of Council of the National Salvation Front until 6 February 1990, as President of the Provisional National Unity Council from 6 February 1990 to 20 June 1990, and then as President of Romania until 29 November 1996.)	26 December 1989	20 June 1990	6 years, 339 days	Feb 1990	FSN (1989–1992) FDSN (1992) PDSR (1992–1996)	Roman I–II–III (1989–1991) Stolojan (1991–1992) Văcăroiu (1992–1996)	President of the Council of the National Salvation Front
—		Ion Iliescu (1930–2025)	26 December 1989	20 June 1990	6 years, 339 days	Feb 1990	FSN (1989–1992) FDSN (1992) PDSR (1992–1996)	Roman I–II–III (1989–1991) Stolojan (1991–1992) Văcăroiu (1992–1996)	President of the Provisional National Unity Council
—		Ion Iliescu (1930–2025)	20 June 1990	29 November 1996	6 years, 339 days	May 1990; 1992	FSN (1989–1992) FDSN (1992) PDSR (1992–1996)	Roman I–II–III (1989–1991) Stolojan (1991–1992) Văcăroiu (1992–1996)	President of Romania
12		Ion Iliescu (1930–2025)	20 June 1990	29 November 1996	6 years, 339 days	May 1990; 1992	FSN (1989–1992) FDSN (1992) PDSR (1992–1996)	Roman I–II–III (1989–1991) Stolojan (1991–1992) Văcăroiu (1992–1996)	President of Romania
(12)		Ion Iliescu (1930–2025)	20 June 1990	29 November 1996	6 years, 339 days	May 1990; 1992	FSN (1989–1992) FDSN (1992) PDSR (1992–1996)	Roman I–II–III (1989–1991) Stolojan (1991–1992) Văcăroiu (1992–1996)	President of Romania
(12)		Ion Iliescu (1930–2025)	20 June 1990	29 November 1996	6 years, 339 days	May 1990; 1992	FSN (1989–1992) FDSN (1992) PDSR (1992–1996)	Roman I–II–III (1989–1991) Stolojan (1991–1992) Văcăroiu (1992–1996)	President of Romania
13		Emil Constantinescu (born 1939)	29 November 1996	20 December 2000	4 years, 21 days	1996	PNȚCD	Ciorbea (1996–1998) Vasile (1998–1999) Isărescu (1999–2000)	President of Romania
(12)		Ion Iliescu (1930–2025)	20 December 2000	20 December 2004	4 years	2000	PDSR	Năstase (2000–2004)	President of Romania
14		Traian Băsescu (born 1951) (Note: Băsescu was impeached twice during his presidency. His powers and duties were suspended during the impeachment processes from 20 April 2007 to 23 May 2007 and from 10 July 2012 to 27 August 2012.)	20 December 2004	21 December 2014	10 years, 1 day	2004 2009	PD (2004–2007) PDL (2007–2014)	Tăriceanu I–II (2004–2008) Boc I–II (2008–2012) Ungureanu (2012) Ponta I–II–III–IV (2012–2014)	President of Romania
(14)		Traian Băsescu (born 1951)	20 December 2004	21 December 2014	10 years, 1 day	2004 2009	PD (2004–2007) PDL (2007–2014)	Tăriceanu I–II (2004–2008) Boc I–II (2008–2012) Ungureanu (2012) Ponta I–II–III–IV (2012–2014)	President of Romania
—		Nicolae Văcăroiu (born 1943) (Note: Văcăroiu acted as President during Băsescu's first impeachment until the latter was reinstated by referendum.)	20 April 2007	23 May 2007	33 days	—	PSD	Tăriceanu II (2007–2008)	ad interim President of Romania (as President of the Senate)
—		Crin Antonescu (born 1959) (Note: Antonescu acted as President during Băsescu's second impeachment until the latter was reinstated by referendum.)	10 July 2012	27 August 2012	48 days	—	PNL	Ponta I (2012)	ad interim President of Romania (as President of the Senate)
15		Klaus Iohannis (born 1959)	21 December 2014	12 February 2025	10 years, 53 days	2014; 2019	PNL	Ponta IV (2014–2015) Cioloș (2015–2017) Grindeanu (2017) Tudose (2017–2018) Dăncilă (2018–2019) Orban I–II (2019–2020) Cîțu (2020–2021) Ciucă (2021–2023) Ciolacu I–II (2023–2025)	President of Romania
—		Ilie Bolojan (born 1969) (Note: Bolojan acted as President after Iohannis' resignation on 10 February 2025, that took effect on 12 February 2025; he served until the conclusion of the 2025 presidential election.)	12 February 2025	26 May 2025	103 days	—	PNL	Ciolacu II (2025)	ad interim President of Romania (as President of the Senate)
16		Nicușor Dan (born 1969)	26 May 2025	Incumbent	1 year, 178 days	2025	Independent	Ciolacu II (2025) Bolojan (2025–2026) Niculescu (2026–present)	President of Romania

== See also ==
- Domnitor
- King of Romania
- President of Romania
  - List of presidents of Romania
  - List of presidents of Romania by time in office
- Prime Minister of Romania
  - List of heads of government of Romania

== Footnotes and references ==
- Bulei, Ion, O istorie a românilor, Editura Meronia, București, 2007, pg. 266–267
