= 1980 Romanian presidential election =

Presidential election of Romania, 1980

| ← 1974 | 28 March 1980 | 1985 → |
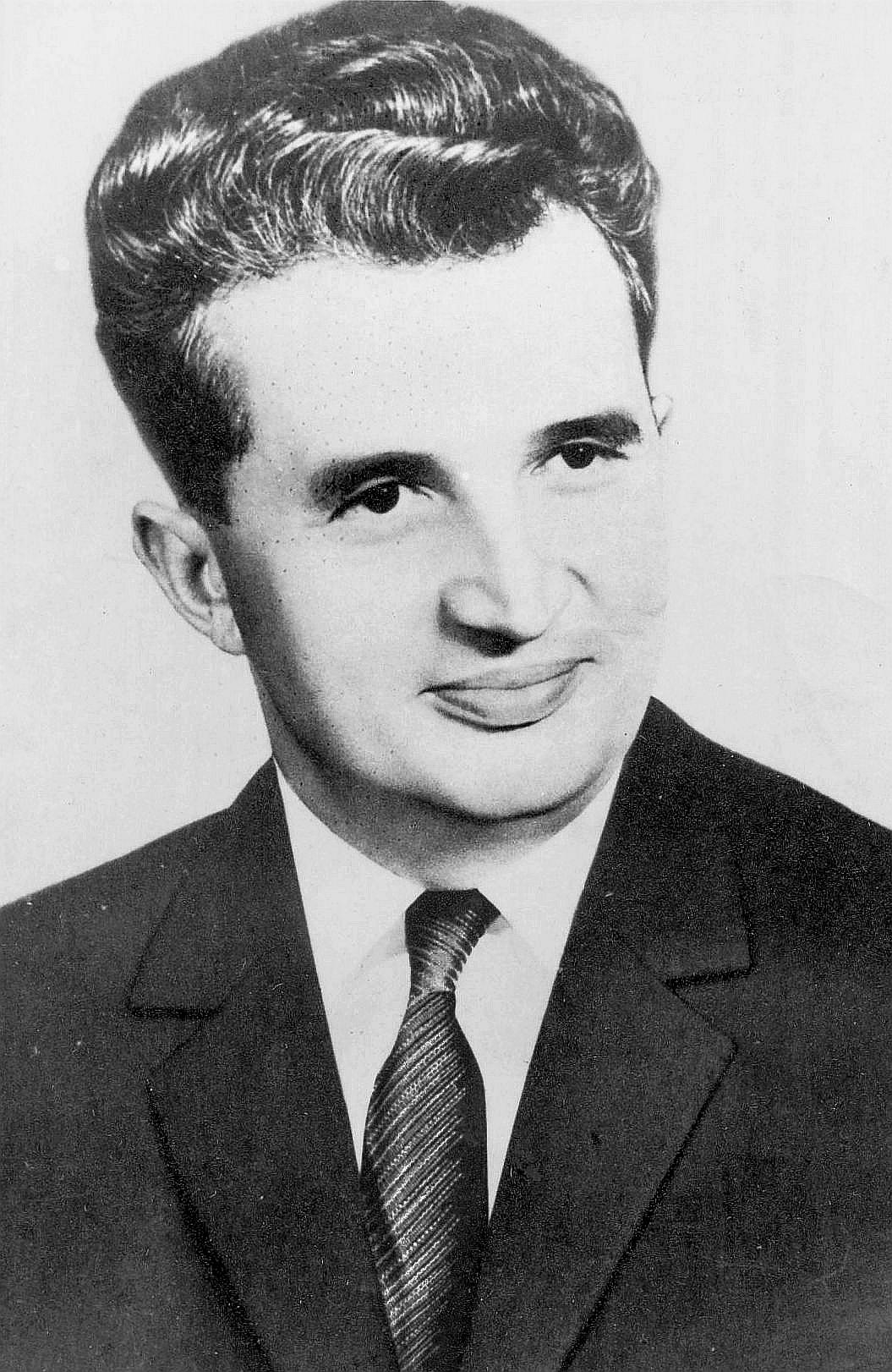
| Nominee | Nicolae Ceaușescu |
| Party | PCR |
| Electoral vote | 465 |
| Percentage | 100% |
President before election
Nicolae Ceaușescu
PCR
Elected President
Nicolae Ceaușescu
PCR

A presidential election was held in the Socialist Republic of Romania on 28 March 1980.

Nicolae Ceaușescu was re-elected by the Great National Assembly as the President of Romania during its meeting of 28 March 1980; he was the only candidate.

== Candidate ==
| Name | Lifespan | Public Administration Experience | Affiliation and endorsements | Candidacy Announcement dates |
|---|---|---|---|---|
| Nicolae Ceaușescu | Born: 26 January 1918 (age 62); Scornicești, Olt County; Died: 25 December 1989, Târgoviște, Dâmbovița County | President of Romania (1974-election day); President of State Council (1967-election day); Deputy Minister of Defence (1950-1954); Vice-President of Great National Assembly (1950-1955); Undersecretary of State with the Ministry of Agriculture (1948-1950); Deputy (1948-election day); Deputy (1946-1948) | Affiliation: Front of Socialist Unity and Democracy; Alliance members: PCR and social and civic organizations | |
