= Săptămîna =

Romanian newspaper

Săptămîna Culturală a Capitalei
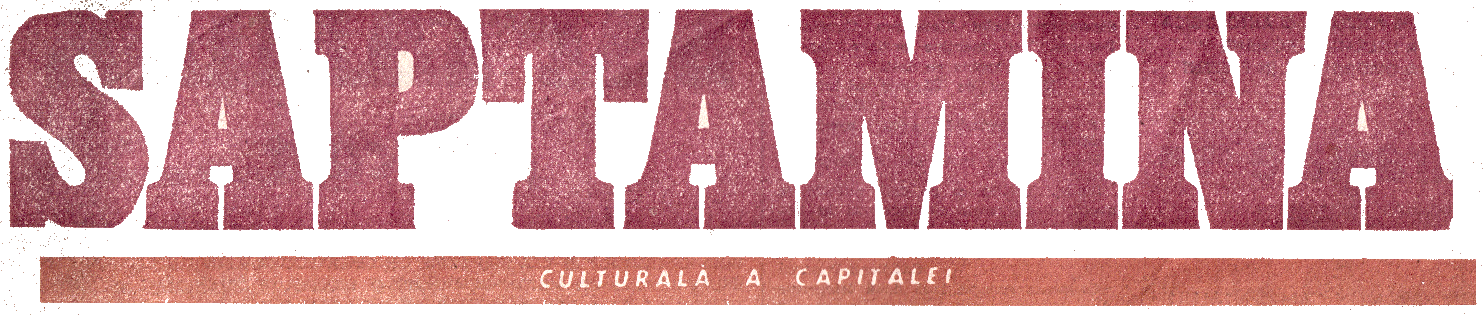
- Săptămîna logo (1981)
- Type: Weekly
- Format: tabloid
- Owner: state-owned
- Publisher: Committee for Culture and Socialist Education of the Bucharest Municipality
- Editor: Eugen Barbu (1970-1989)
- Political alignment: National Communism
- Headquarters: Str. Brezoianu 23-25, Et. 4
- Price: 1 leu (1980s)
- ISSN: 1221-2970
- OCLC number: 681152662

Săptămîna (The Week in Romanian) was a newspaper published in the Socialist Republic of Romania focusing on Bucharest's cultural scene. During the 1980s, the leading editors were Eugen Barbu and Corneliu Vadim Tudor and the newspaper had very strong pro-Nicolae Ceaușescu and National Communist views and it attacked and slandered detractors of Ceaușescu, both those living in Romania and those living in the exile.

== Ideology ==
Following the speeches of the 1971 July Theses, through which Ceaușescu imposed a new ideology, Eugen Barbu, a writer seeing a waning influence, took the opportunity to be the greatest supporter of this new ideology of protochronism.

=== Antisemitism ===
In a September 5, 1980 article entitled "Ideals", Corneliu Vadim Tudor presented the first anti-semitic view published in Romania after World War II. The article attacked the Jews, who, in contrast to the loyal Romanians were "running away in the face of hardships" (referring to Aliyah). The Jews were seen as "visitors", "avid for enrichment", "Herod's strangers to the interests of this nation" and who lacked the Romanian notion of self-sacrifice. Chief Rabbi of Romania, Moses Rosen protested by writing a letter to the newspaper and on October 24, a retraction was published, arguing that the newspaper did not support such extreme views.

The debate over the issue continued as a brochure began to circulate in Romania, containing the Săptămîna editorial, as well as Rabbi Rosen's protest under the title "Chief Rabbi Trafficker Patriot". While protests over the issue were voiced from Israel and other external Jewish circles, the official response was that they were printed abroad and shipped by Romanian-Italian businessman Iosif Constantin Drăgan, who was alleged to have some links to Săptămîna. In April 1981, Ceaușescu had to condemn anti-semitism in a speech. Nevertheless, it is alleged that the whole antisemitic incident was sparked by Ceaușescu's anger over the Jewish lobby which tried to tie the US Most favoured nation clause to the freedom to emigrate to Israel, something which was misunderstood by the sycophants at Săptămîna.

=== Conflict with the Writers' Union ===
On September 18, 1980, the national communist group from Săptămîna addressed Ceaușescu demanding the disbanding of the Writers' Union of Romania which they argued that it was "sold to the West" and "reactionary" and create a new Communist Writers' Union. Ceaușescu realized that this was a fringe view among the writers and disagreed with this solution.

On October 13, Ceaușescu discussed with a group of a hundred writers from the Writers' Union, who demanded that the activity of the Săptămîna newspaper to be reproached and the reduction of the ideological pressures over the writers. While Ceaușescu agreed in principle, he was just postponing taking an action, which was taken after the 1981 Conference of the Writers' Union of Romania.

== Attacks on dissidents ==
Săptămîna tended to attack all Romanian dissidents (both within and outside the country) or even people who they didn't see as patriotic enough. For instance, Eugen Barbu called Paul Goma "a nullity" on April 8, 1977.

== Legacy ==
After 1989, the two former editors of Săptămîna, Eugen Barbu and Corneliu Vadim Tudor became associates in a newspaper called România Mare, which exposed extreme nationalist views. A party was created to suit their view, Greater Romania Party, which became the most important nationalist party in post-1989 Romanian history.
