= 1967 Romanian State Council president election =

An equivalent of presidential election was held in the Socialist Republic of Romania between 6–9 December 1967.

On 6–8 December 1967, Romanian Communist Party held its National Conference in Bucharest. Chivu Stoica announced in the meeting of 7 December 1967 his resignation from the office of President of the State Council and a proposal that this office should be held by the same person that holds the office of General Secretary of the Romanian Communist Party.

On 8 December 1967, the old State Council of Romania held its last session. Its members voted secretly voted the new leadership.

On 9 December 1967, the Great National Assembly (Romania's Communist parliament) voted unanimously in favor of the new composition of the State Council. Nicolae Ceaușescu became the third president of the State Council of Romania, de facto Romanian head of state.

== Candidates ==
Name	Lifespan	Public Administration Experience	Affiliation and endorsements	Candidacy Announcement dates
Nicolae Ceaușescu	Born: January 26, 1918 (age 49); Scornicești, Olt County; Died: December 25, 1989, Târgoviște, Dâmbovița County	Deputy, Communist parliament (1948-election day); Deputy Minister of Defence (1950–1954); Vice-president of Great National Assembly (1950–1955); Undersecretary of State with the Ministry of Agriculture (1948–1950); Deputy, old parliament (1946–1948)	Affiliation: People's Democratic Front; Alliance members: PCR and social and civic organizations	Intention: December 7, 1967; Official: December 8, 1967
