= 1985 Romanian presidential election =

Presidential election of Romania, 1985

← 1980	29 March 1985	1990 →
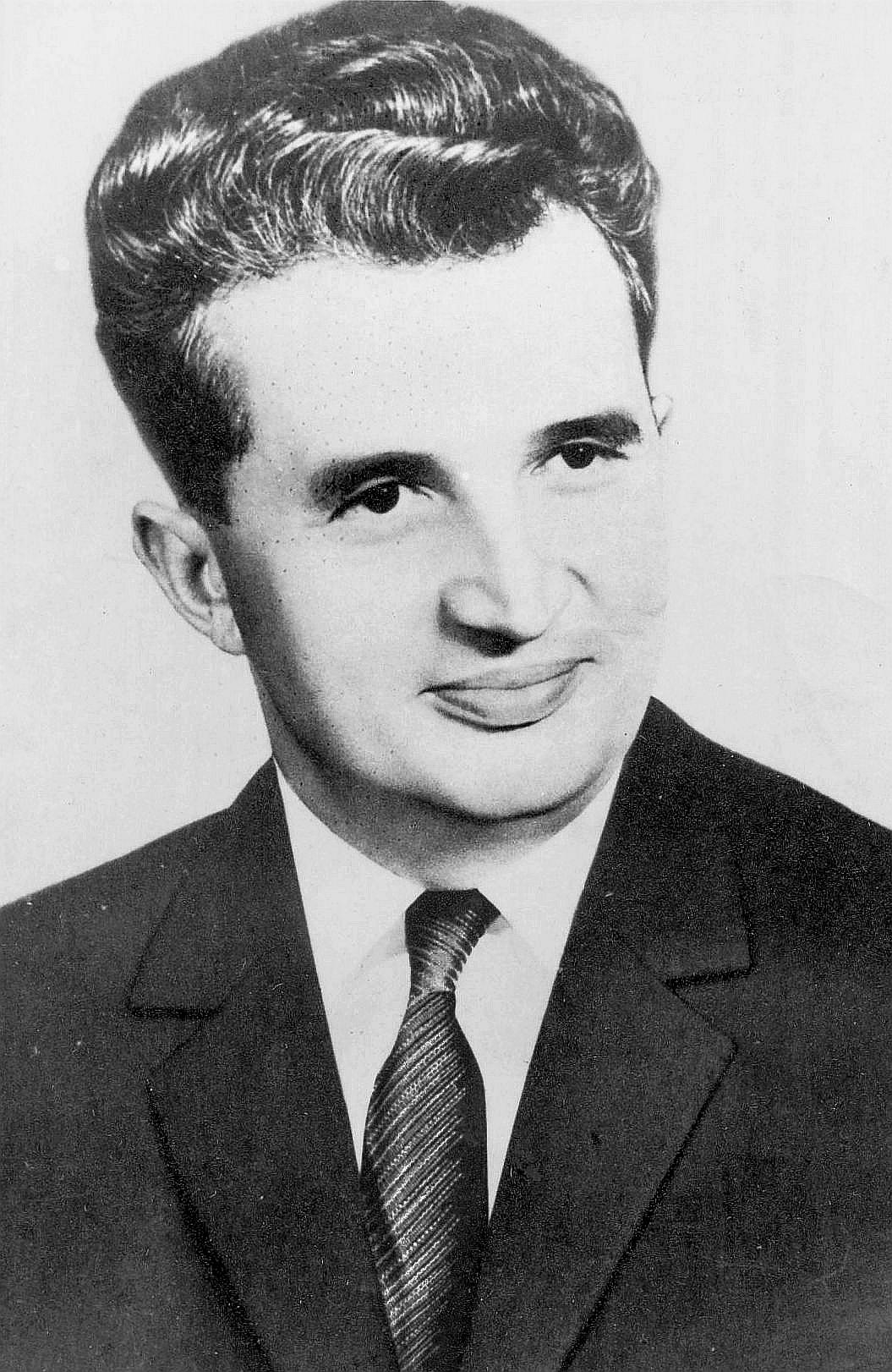
Nominee	Nicolae Ceaușescu
Party	PCR
Electoral vote	369
Percentage	100%
President before election
Nicolae Ceaușescu
PCR
Elected President
Nicolae Ceaușescu
PCR

A presidential election was held in the Socialist Republic of Romania on 29 March 1985.

Nicolae Ceaușescu was re-elected by the Great National Assembly as the President of Romania during its meeting of 28–29 March 1985; he was the only candidate.

== Candidate ==
Name	Lifespan	Public Administration Experience	Affiliation and endorsements	Candidacy Announcement dates
Nicolae Ceaușescu	Born: 26 January 1918 (age 67); Scornicești, Olt County; Died: 25 December 1989, Târgoviște, Dâmbovița County	President of Romania (1974-election day); President of State Council (1967-election day); Deputy Minister of Defence (1950-1954); Vice-president of Great National Assembly (1950-1955); Undersecretary of State with the Ministry of Agriculture (1948-1950); Deputy (1948-election day); Deputy (1946-1948)	Affiliation: Front of Socialist Unity and Democracy; Aliance members: PCR and social and civic organizations	
