= 1965 Romanian State Council president election =

An equivalent of presidential election was held in the Romanian People's Republic between 23 and 24 March 1965.

On 23 March 1965, the Romanian Workers' Party held its Central Committee session in Bucharest. The party leaders proposed the Great National Assembly (Romania's Communist parliament) the next General Secretary of the party should be Nicolae Ceaușescu and the next president of the State Council of Romania should be Chivu Stoica.

On 24 March 1965, the Great National Assembly voted in favor of Chivu Stoica, thus becoming the second president of the State Council of Romania, de facto Romanian head of state.

== Candidate ==
Name	Lifespan	Public Administration Experience	Affiliation and endorsements	Alma mater and profession	Candidacy Announcement dates
Chivu Stoica	Born: August 8, 1908 (age 56); Smeeni, Buzău County; Died: February 18, 1975, Bucharest	Deputy, Communist parliament (1948-election day); Prime Minister of Romania (1955-1961); Deputy Prime Minister of Romania (1950-1955); Minister of Metallurgy and Machinery Assembly (1953-1955); Minister of Metallurgy and Chemical Industry (1949-1952); Minister of Industry (1948-1949); Deputy, old parliament (1946-1948)	Affiliation: People's Democratic Front; Alliance members: PCR and social and civic organizations	CFR Apprentice School, Buzău (1927) railway worker	Official: March 22, 1965
