= SLOMR =

Independent trade union in the Socialist Republic of Romania

- Free Trade Union of the Working People of Romania
- Sindicatul Liber al Oamenilor Muncii din România
- Founded: 1979
- Dissolved: 1979
- Headquarters: Bucharest, Romania
- Location: Romania
- Members: 2,400
- Key people: Ionel Cană, founder Paul Goma; Gheorghe Calciu-Dumitreasa
- Affiliations: International Confederation of Free Trade Unions

SLOMR (Romanian language acronym for Sindicatul Liber al Oamenilor Muncii din România, 'Free Trade Union of the Working People of Romania') was a Romanian free trade union founded, without prior preparation, in February 1979, as a means to oppose the control exercised by the ruling Communist Party during the country's communist period. Initiated along the same lines as Solidarity, created one year later in the People's Republic of Poland, it grew to about 2,400 adherents within four weeks, and was dismantled by the authorities of Nicolae Ceaușescu's regime, coordinated by the Securitate, over the next three months.

== Background ==
In January 1979, a group of fifteen workers from the shipyards in the Danube port of Drobeta-Turnu Severin approached Ionel Cană, a physician who had worked in Olt County amongst workers and had recently moved to Bucharest; Cană, who had already helped workers draw up petitions complaining about labour conditions, agreed to the men's proposal to set up a union.

== Creation ==
The founding declaration, signed by 20 persons, was broadcast by Noël Bernard over Radio Free Europe on March 4, 1979. The names of the 20 founder members of SLOMR, with their occupations and addresses, were appended to the text. The document stated that the organisation, legally established under Romanian law, was affiliated to the International Confederation of Free Trade Unions. Pointing at the declining work and living conditions and at the difficulties workers had in expressing themselves freely and defend their interests, the declaration indicated that the new labour organization was not backed by any political force, and that its objects were to ensure justice in the social and labour areas.

The intention of the new trade union was to enter the struggle against unemployment, for better working conditions, for safety and health in the factories, for the revision of the wage system and the pension system, for the reduction of the weekly work period and the suppression of unpaid overtime, etc. The new union, insisting on the legality of the steps it had taken, requested a frank dialogue with the authorities for the settlement of these claims.

Soon, about 2,400 of workers from various localities such as Bucharest, Ploiești, Constanța, Târgu Mureş and Timișoara joined the new union, which also added to its programme more general claims such as freedom for all workers, including peasants, to change their place of work, the right to a decent wage for peasants and the right to freely sell their products and the suppression of terror and internment in psychiatric hospitals of those who demanded that their rights be respected. The dissident Romanian Orthodox Church priest Gheorghe Calciu-Dumitreasa offered to be a spiritual adviser. The new trade union was also supported by the writer and dissident Paul Goma. An additional manifesto calling for the legalization of unofficial trade unions and observance of the right to free association was also released.

== Repression ==
The SLOMR's establishment and the issue of its constituent statement were almost immediately followed by a wave of repression against the body and its members — it included massive arrests, involuntary commitment in psychiatric hospitals, exile, systematic harassment, beatings, as well as a summary trial and prison sentence passed on the SLOMR founder and other leading members. Thus, the 20 founders have been arrested and sentenced to prison, Ion Cană being condemned to a 7 years term for "disseminating fascist propaganda". Another trade union leader, Gheorghe Brașoveanu, was confined to a psychiatric institution while the prominent opponent Vasile Paraschiv underwent harsh psychiatric treatment.

In April the SLOMR, in an open letter to Ceaușescu, protested against the arrest of its members, among them Cană and Brașoveanu (the two were eventually released in 1980). Cană's successor as chairman, Nicolae Dascălu, was sentenced in June to 18 months in prison for allegedly passing state secrets to Amnesty International.

In Timișoara Carl Gibson, Erwin Ludwig, Prof. Dr. Fenelon Sacerdoțeanu and other 20 persons formed — after personal talks with Dascălu and other dissidents from Bucharest — the regional SLOMR of Timișoara. Gibson and Ludwig were arrested on April 4, accused of having created an "anarchistic organisation" and sentenced to six months in prison. A further 153 leaders of the union, among them Virgil Chender from Sighișoara, were arrested on charges of "parasitism" and "hooliganism", and placed under house arrest, interned in psychiatric hospitals, deported, imprisoned or expelled from the country after serving their sentences. Father Calciu-Dumitreasa was sentenced to ten years in prison.

A number of trade unionists were also obliged to sign statements disclaiming the existence of the SLOMR. At the same time, the authorities launched a campaign of slander and harsh threats designed to destroy the union. After he arrived in Germany, Gibson became the speaker of the SLOMR in the West. Together with a group of Romanian dissidents from France and Switzerland, he informed the World Confederation of Labour in Brussels and the United Nations' International Labour Organization about the free trade union movement in Romania and about the human rights violations. The support group was able to convince both organisations to post a complaint against the regime in Bucharest.

After the initial arrest of the leaders of the union, others took over the task of organising the union but a month later they were arrested as well and the remainder were subjected to permanent harassment. In a last and successful attempt to dismantle the entire organization, in June several hundred union members were arrested throughout the country at the same time. The communist Romanian regime alleged not to have any knowledge of the new union.

== Bibliography ==
- Carl Gibson,
  - "Un pas spre libertate. Sindicatul liber al oamenilor muncii din R.S. România", in Presa Libera Română, March 1, 1981
  - "Widerstandsbewegungen gegen die Ceausescu-Diktatur", in Frankfurter Allgemeine Zeitung, November 15, 1988
- Mariana Hausleitner, "Politischer Widerstand in Rumänien vor 1989", in Halbjahresschrift für süosteuropäische Geschichte, Literatur und Politik (special edition: "Opposition und Repression im Realsozialismus"), Dinklage, 1996
- Ion Solacolu, a short history of the SLOMR movement (with an interview with Carl Gibson), in Dialog, March 1989 (special issue), published by the Democratic Circle of Romanians in Germany. Includes the text of the SLOMR constitution as written down by Ionel Cană in March 1979.
