= 1961 Romanian State Council president election =

An equivalent of presidential election was held in the Romanian People's Republic on 21 March 1961.

The name of the Presidium of the Great National Assembly (Romania's Communist parliament) is changed into State Council of Romania and Gheorghe Gheorghiu-Dej features the president of the new institution, thus becoming the first president of the State Council, de facto head of state. This change was enforced as the Law #1/1961 and voted by the Great National Assembly.

== Candidate ==
Name	Lifespan	Public Administration Experience	Affiliation and endorsements	Alma mater and profession	Candidacy Announcement dates
Gheorghe Gheorghiu-Dej	Born: November 8, 1901 (age 59); Bârlad, Vaslui County; Died: March 19, 1965, Bucharest	Prime Minister of Romania (1952-1955); Deputy Prime Minister of Romania (1948-1952); Minister of Industry and Commerce (1947-1948); Minister of National Economy (1946-1947); Minister of Communication (1944-1946); Deputy (1948-election day); Deputy (1946-1948)	Affiliation: Front of Socialist Unity; Alliance members: PCR and social and civic organizations	"Ștefan Luchian" Gimnasium School of Moinești electrician, railway worker	
