= 1974 Romanian presidential election =

Presidential election of Romania, 1974

- 28 March 1974
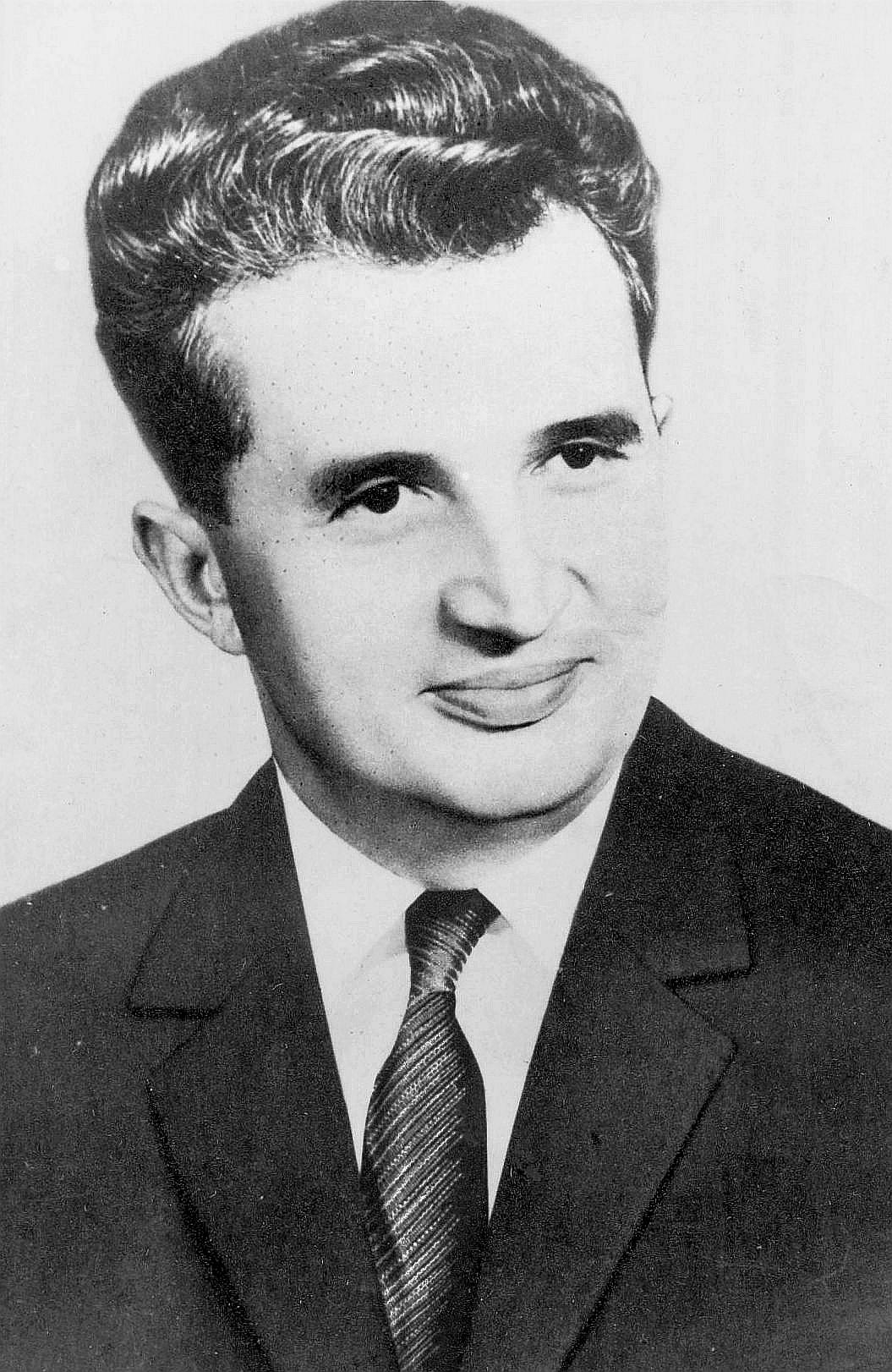
Nominee	Nicolae Ceaușescu
Party	PCR
Electoral vote	465
Percentage	100%
Elected President
Nicolae Ceaușescu
PCR

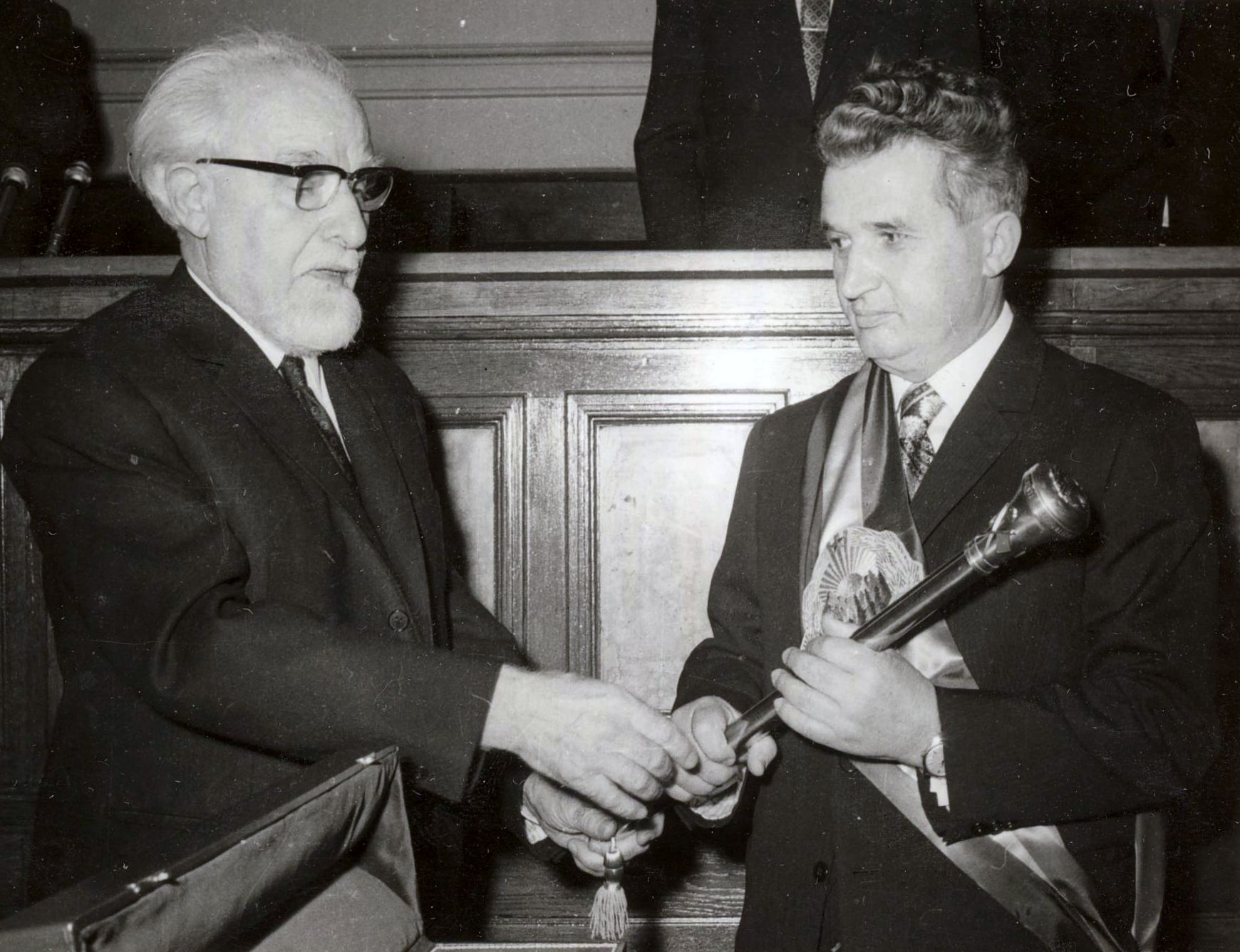
Ceaușescu receiving the presidential sceptre from the chairman of the Great National Assembly, Ștefan Voitec

A presidential election was held in the Socialist Republic of Romania on 28 March 1974. It was the first election held after the post of President of the Republic was created by an amendment to the Constitution earlier in the year.

Nicolae Ceaușescu, incumbent General Secretary of the Romanian Communist Party and president of the State Council, was elected by the Great National Assembly as the first President of the Republic on 28 March 1974; he was the only candidate. On 4 April 1974, the Communist Party daily Scînteia published a congratulatory telegram, in which Salvador Dalí actually mocked Ceaușescu on his "introducing the presidential scepter". Being successively re-elected, Ceaușescu served as the president until 22 December 1989.

== Candidate ==
Name	Lifespan	Public Administration Experience	Affiliation and endorsements	Candidacy Announcement dates
Nicolae Ceaușescu	Born: 26 January 1918 (age 56); Scornicești, Olt County; Died: 25 December 1989, Târgoviște, Dâmbovița County	President of State Council (1967-election day); Deputy Minister of Defence (1950-1954); Vice-President of Great National Assembly (1950-1955); Undersecretary of State with the Ministry of Agriculture (1948-1950); Deputy (1948-election day); Deputy (1946-1948)	Affiliation: Front of Socialist Unity; Alliance members: PCR and social and civic organizations	
