= 1990 Romanian Provisional National Unity Council president election =

An election was held in Romania for the presidency of the Provisional Council of National Unity (CPUN) on 13 February 1990. Ion Iliescu was elected by the as the body's president — hence as acting/ad interim President of Romania — in a meeting held on 13 February 1990. During that meeting, the CPUN also chose its Executive Office members. Nevertheless, the vote count was never published.

== Background ==
The CPUN was created on 9 February 1990 as a recomposition of the Council of the National Salvation Front (CFSN), with the inclusion of 112 political parties representatives (3 per each party), 27 national minorities representatives, and 3 representatives of the former political convicts (besides 112 representatives of the National Salvation Front or FSN for short, Romania's largest governing body during the early 1990s). This body acted as an ad interim single-chamber parliament, until the 1990 Romanian general election, when it was replaced with an elected two-chamber parliament.
