= Romanian Communist Party =

Ruling party of Romania (1921–1989)

Romanian Communist Party Partidul Comunist Român
- Founded: 8 May 1921; 105 years ago
- Dissolved: 25 December 1989; 36 years ago
- Preceded by: Socialist Party of Romania
- Succeeded by: Socialist Party of Labour
- Headquarters: Bucharest
- Newspaper: Scînteia
- Youth wing: Union of Communist Youth
- Pioneer wing: Pioneer Organisation
- Paramilitary wing: Patriotic Guards
- Membership: 3.6–4 million (1989 est.)
- Ideology: Communism; Marxism–Leninism; Stalinism (until 1956); Socialist patriotism Left-wing nationalism Romanian nationalism After 1971: National communism Neo-Stalinism
- Affiliations: See full list: FND/BPD (1944–68); FDUS (1968–89); Balkan Communist Federation (1921–39); Comintern (1921–43); Cominform (1947–56)
- Colours: Red Gold
- Anthem: Internaționala (lit. 'The Internationale')

Party flag

The Romanian Communist Party (Romanian: Partidul Comunist Român [parˈtidul komuˈnist roˈmɨn]; PCR) was a Marxist-Leninist party in Romania. It was founded in 1921 and became the founding and ruling party of the Communist Socialist Republic of Romania in 1947. From then, until its overthrow in the Romanian revolution in 1989, it was effectively the only legal party in the country. Ideologically committed to Marxism–Leninism, the party oversaw Romania's departure from Soviet satellite status and incorporation of national communism.

The successor to the pro-Bolshevik wing of the Socialist Party of Romania, it gave an ideological endorsement to a communist revolution that would replace the social system of the Kingdom of Romania. After being outlawed in 1924, the PCR remained a minor, illegal grouping for much of the interwar period and was subject to direct Comintern control. During the 1920s and 1930s, most of its activists were imprisoned or sought refuge in the Soviet Union, leading to the creation of competing factions that sometimes came into open conflict. That did not prevent the party from participating in the country's political life through various front organizations, most notably the Peasant Workers' Bloc. In 1934–1936, PCR reformed itself in the mainland of Romania, with foreign observers predicting a possible communist takeover. The party emerged as a powerful actor on the Romanian political scene in August 1944, when it became involved in the royal coup that toppled the pro-Nazi government of Ion Antonescu. With support from Soviet occupational forces, the PCR pressured King Michael I into abdicating, and it established the Romanian People's Republic in December 1947.

The party operated as the Romanian Workers' Party (Partidul Muncitoresc Romîn between 1948 and 1964 and Partidul Muncitoresc Român in 1964 and 1965) until it was officially renamed by Nicolae Ceaușescu, who had just been elected secretary general. While other political parties nominally existed in Romania, their influence was limited, and they were required to accept the constitutionally authorised leading role of the PCR as a condition of their existence. All other legal parties and entities were part of the Communist-dominated Front of Socialist Unity and Democracy.

Ideologically, the PCR was committed to Marxism–Leninism, a fusion of the original ideas of German philosopher and economic theorist Karl Marx, and Lenin, was introduced in 1929 by the Soviet leader Joseph Stalin, as the party's guiding ideology and would remain so through much of its existence. In 1948, the Communist Party absorbed the Romanian Social Democratic Party and attracted various new members. In the early 1950s, the group around Gheorghe Gheorghiu-Dej, with support from Stalin, defeated all other factions and achieved full control over the party and country. After the late 1950s, the party gradually theorized a "national path" to communism. At the same time, however, the party delayed the time to join its Warsaw Pact brethren in de-Stalinization. The PCR's Romanian nationalist and stance was continued under the leadership of Nicolae Ceaușescu. Following an episode of liberalization in the late 1960s, Ceaușescu again adopted a hard line by imposing the "July Theses", re-Stalinizing the party's rule by intensifying the spread of Marxist–Leninist ideology in Romanian society and solidifying a national communist line. At the same time, he consolidated his grip on power whilst using the party's authority to brew a pervasive cult of personality. Over the years, the PCR became entirely submitted to Ceaușescu's will. From the 1960s onward, it had a reputation for being far more independent of the Soviet Union than its brethren in the Warsaw Pact. However, it also became one of the hardest-line parties in the Eastern Bloc, which harmed its relationship with the Communist Party of the Soviet Union. It collapsed in 1989 in the wake of the Romanian revolution, but Romania kept its socialist-era constitution until 1991. Romania also retained its membership in the Warsaw Pact until its dissolution on 1 July 1991; that role had been largely symbolic since the late 1960s.

The PCR was a communist party, organized on democratic centralism, a principle conceived by Russian Marxist theoretician Vladimir Lenin, which entails democratic and open discussion of policy, subject to unity in upholding agreed-upon policies. The highest body within the PCR was the Party Congress, which began convening in 1969 and meet every five years. The Central Committee was the highest body when Congress was not in session. Because the Central Committee met only twice a year, most day-to-day duties and responsibilities were vested in Politburo. The party leader held the office of General Secretary and, after 1945, held significant influence over the government. Between 1974 and 1989, the General Secretary also held the office of President of Romania. The PCR co-ordinated several organizations during its existence, including the Union of Communist Youth, and organized training for its cadres at the Ștefan Gheorghiu Academy (future SNSPA). In addition to Scînteia, its official platform and main newspaper between 1931 and 1989, the party issued several local and national publications at various points in its history (including, after 1944, România Liberă).

== History ==
=== Establishment ===
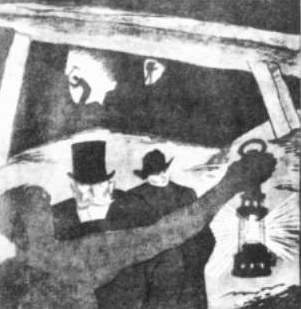
Criticism among socialist groups, as illustrated in a December 1922 caricature by Nicolae Tonitza. The mine owner to the miner: "A socialist, you say? My son is a socialist too, but without going on strike..., that is why he already has his own capital..."

The party was founded in 1921 when the Bolshevik-inspired maximalist faction won control of Romania's Social-Democratic party—the Socialist Party of Romania, successor to the defunct Romanian Social-Democratic Workers' Party and the short-lived Social Democratic Party of Romania (the latter was refounded in 1927, reuniting those opposed to communist policies). The establishment was linked with the socialist group's affiliation to the Comintern (just before the latter's Third Congress): after a delegation was sent to Bolshevist Russia, a group of moderates (including Ioan Flueraș, Iosif Jumanca, Leon Ghelerter, and Constantin Popovici) left at different intervals beginning with January 1921.

The party renamed itself the Socialist-Communist Party (Partidul Socialist-Comunist) and, soon after, the Communist Party of Romania (Partidul Comunist din România or PCdR). Government crackdown and competition with other socialist groups brought a drastic reduction in its membership—from the ca. 40,000 members the Socialist Party had, the new group was left with as much as 2,000 or as little as 500; after the fall of one-party rule in 1989, Romanian historians generally asserted that the party only had around 1,000 members at the end of World War II. Other researchers argue that this figure may have been intentionally based on the Muscovite faction figures and, as such, underestimated to undermine the influence of the internal faction; this estimate was afterwards promoted in post-communist historiography to reinforce a stereotypical image of the regime as illegitimate.

The early Communist Party had little influence in Romania. This was due to a number of factors: the country's lack of industrial development, which resulted in a relatively small working class (with industry and mining employing fewer than 10% of the active population) and a large peasant population; the minor impact of Marxism among Romanian intellectuals; the success of state repression in driving the party underground and limiting its activities; and finally, the party's "anti-national" policy, as it began to be stated in the 1920s—supervised by the Comintern, this policy called for the breakup of Greater Romania, which was regarded as a colonial entity "illegally occupying" Transylvania, Dobruja, Bessarabia and Bukovina (regions that, the communists argued, had been denied the right of self-determination). In 1924, the Comintern provoked Romanian authorities by encouraging the Tatarbunary Uprising in southern Bessarabia, in an attempt to create a Moldavian republic on Romanian territory; also in that year, a Moldavian Autonomous Soviet Socialist Republic, roughly corresponding to Transnistria, was established inside the Soviet Union.

At the same time, the left-wing political spectrum was dominated by Poporanism, an original ideology which partly reflected Narodnik influence, placed its focus on the peasantry (as it notably did with the early advocacy of cooperative farming by Ion Mihalache's Peasants' Party), and usually strongly supported the post-1919 territorial status quo—although they tended to oppose the centralized system it had come to imply. (In turn, the early conflict between the PCdR and other minor socialist groups has been attributed to the legacy of Constantin Dobrogeanu-Gherea's quasi-Poporanist ideas inside the latter, as an intellectual basis for the rejection of Leninism.)

The PCdR's "foreign" image was because ethnic Romanians were a minority in its ranks until after the end of World War II: between 1924 and 1944, none of its general secretaries was of Romanian ethnicity. Interwar Romania had a minority population of 30%, and it was largely from this section that the party drew its membership—a large percentage of it was Jews, Hungarians and Bulgarians. Actual or perceived ethnic discrimination against these minorities added to the appeal of revolutionary ideas in their midst.

=== Communist Party of Romania (1921–1948) ===
==== Comintern and internal wing ====
Shortly after its creation, the PCdR's leadership was alleged by authorities to have been involved in Max Goldstein's bomb attack on the Parliament of Romania; all major party figures, including the general secretary Gheorghe Cristescu, were prosecuted in the Dealul Spirii Trial. Constantin Argetoianu, the Minister of the Interior in the Alexandru Averescu, Take Ionescu, and Ion I. C. Brătianu cabinets, equated Comintern membership with conspiracy, ordered the first in a series of repressions, and, in the context of trial, allowed for several communist activists (including Leonte Filipescu) to be shot while in custody—alleging that they had attempted to flee. Consequently, Argetoianu stated his belief that"communism is over in Romania", which allowed for a momentary relaxing of pressures—begun by King Ferdinand's granting of an amnesty to the tried PCdR.

The PCdR was thus unable to send representatives to the Comintern, and was virtually replaced abroad by a delegation of various activists who had fled to the Soviet Union at various intervals (Romanian groups in Moscow and Kharkiv, the sources of a "Muscovite wing" in the following decades). The interior party only survived as an underground group after it was outlawed by the Brătianu government through the Mârzescu Law (named after its proponent, Minister of Justice Gheorghe Gh. Mârzescu), passed in early 1924; Comintern sources indicate that, around 1928, it was losing contact with Soviet overseers. In 1925, the question of Romania's borders as posed by the Comintern led to protests by Cristescu and, eventually, to his exclusion from the party (see Balkan Communist Federation).

Around the time of the party's Fifth Congress in 1931, the Muscovite wing became the PCdR's main political factor: Joseph Stalin replaced the entire party leadership, including the general secretary Vitali Holostenco—appointing instead Alexander Stefanski, who was at the time a member of the Communist Party of Poland.

The interior wing began organizing itself as a more efficient conspiratorial network through regained Comintern control. The onset of the Great Depression in Romania, and the series of strikes infiltrated (and sometimes provoked) by the interior wing signified relative successes (see Lupeni Strike of 1929), but gains were not capitalized—as lack of ideological appeal and suspicion of Stalinist directives remained notable factors. In parallel, its leadership suffered changes that were meant to place it under an ethnic Romanian and working-class leadership—the emergence of a Stalin-backed group around Gheorghe Gheorghiu-Dej before and after the large-scale Grivița Strikes.

In 1934, Stalin's Popular Front doctrine was not fully passed into the local party's politics, mainly due to the Soviet territorial policies (culminating in the 1939 Molotov–Ribbentrop Pact) and the widespread suspicion other left-wing forces maintained toward the Comintern. The Communists did, nevertheless, attempt to reach consensus with other groupings on several occasions (in 1934–1943, they established alliances with the Ploughmen's Front, the Hungarian People's Union, and the Socialist Peasants' Party), and small Communist groups became active in the leftist sections of mainstream parties. In 1934, Petre Constantinescu-Iași and other PCdR supporters created Amicii URSS, a pro-Soviet group reaching out to intellectuals, itself banned later in the same year.

During the 1937 elections, the Communists backed Iuliu Maniu and the National Peasants' Party against King Carol II and the Gheorghe Tătărescu government (who had intensified repression of Communist groups), finding themselves placed in an unusual position after the Iron Guard, a fascist movement, signed an electoral pact with Maniu; participation in the move was explained by Communist historiography as provoked by the Social-Democrats' refusal to collaborate with the PCdR.

In the years following the elections, the PCdR entered a phase of rapid decline, coinciding with the increasingly authoritarian tone of King Carol's regime (but in fact inaugurated by the 1936 Craiova Trial of Ana Pauker and other high-ranking Communists). Journals viewed as associates of the party were closed down, and all suspected PCdR activists faced detention (see Doftana Prison). Siguranța Statului, the Romanian secret police, infiltrated the small interior wing and probably obtained valuable information about its activities. The financial resources of the party, ensured by Soviet support and by various satellite organizations (collecting funds in the name of causes such as pacifism or support for the Republican side in the Spanish Civil War), were severely drained—by political difficulties at home, as well as, after 1939, by the severing of connections with Moscow in France and Czechoslovakia.

Consequently, the executive committee of the Comintern called on Romanian Communists to infiltrate the National Renaissance Front (FRN), the newly created sole legal party of Carol's dictatorship, and attempt to attract members of its structures to the revolutionary cause.

Until 1944, the group active inside Romania became split between the "prison faction" (political prisoners who looked to Gheorghiu-Dej as their leader) and the one around Ștefan Foriș and Remus Koffler. The exterior faction of the party was decimated during the Great Purge: an entire generation of party activists was killed on Stalin's orders, including, among others, Alexandru Dobrogeanu-Gherea, David Fabian, Ecaterina Arbore, Imre Aladar, Elena Filipescu, Dumitru Grofu, Ion Dic Dicescu, Eugen Rozvan, Marcel Pauker, Alexander Stefanski, Timotei Marin, and Elek Köblös. It was to be Ana Pauker's mission to take over and reshape the surviving structure.

==== World War II ====
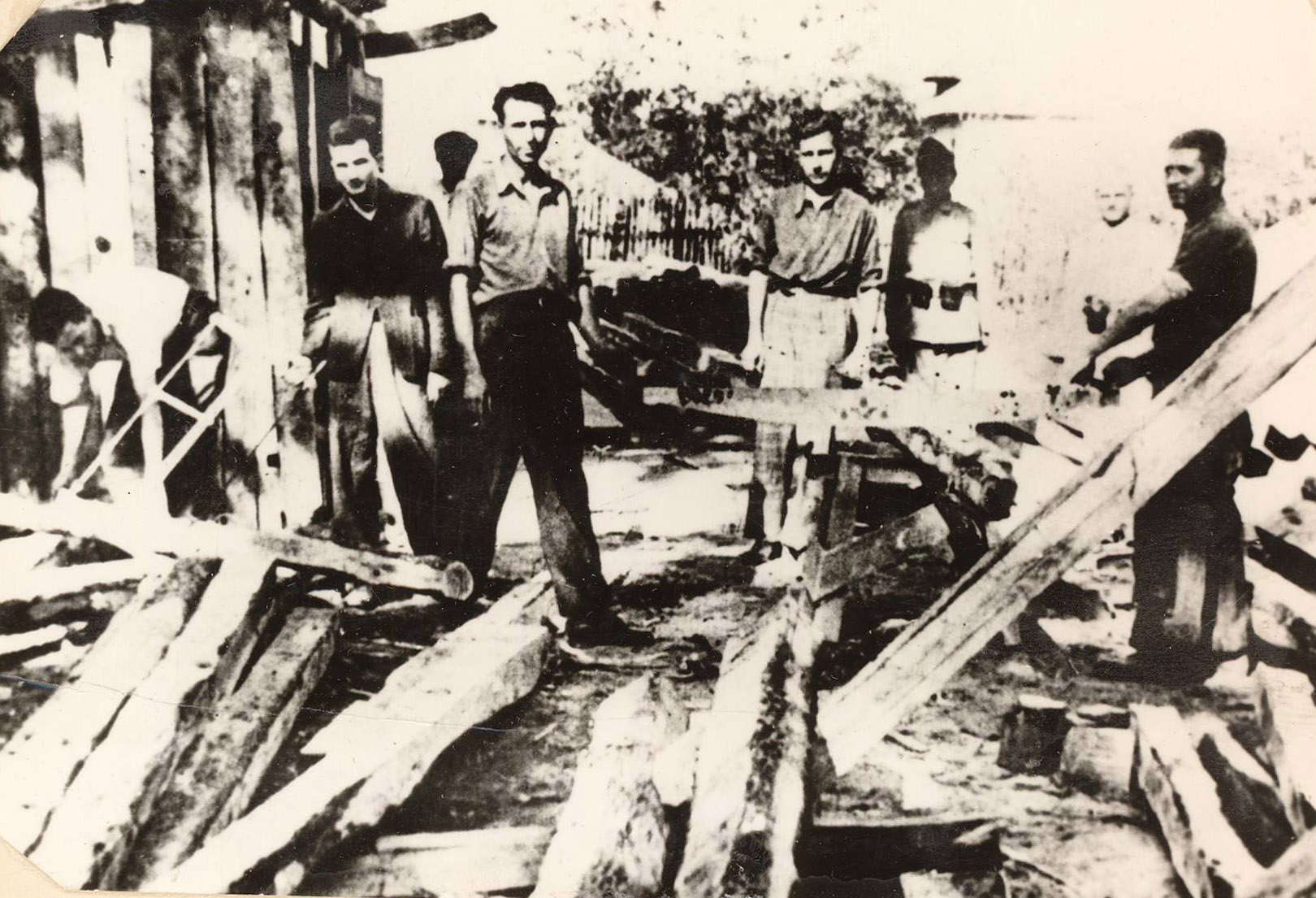
Political prisoners of the Ion Antonescu regime, photographed in Târgu Jiu camp in 1943 (Nicolae Ceaușescu, future leader of Communist Romania, is second from left)

In 1940, Romania had to cede Bessarabia and Northern Bukovina to the Soviet Union and Southern Dobruja to Bulgaria (see Soviet occupation of Bessarabia, Treaty of Craiova); in contrast with the general mood, the PCdR welcomed both gestures along the lines of its earlier activism. Official history, after ca. 1950, stated that the PCdR protested Northern Transylvania's cession to Hungary later in the same year (the Second Vienna Arbitration), but evidence is inconclusive (party documents attesting the policy are dated after Nazi Germany's invasion of the Soviet Union). As the border changes sparked a political crisis leading to an Iron Guard takeover—the National Legionary State—the interior wing's confusion intensified: the upper echelon faced investigation from Georgi Dimitrov (as well as other Comintern officials) on charges of "Trotskyism", and, since the FRN had crumbled, several low-ranking party officials actually began collaborating with the new regime. At around the same time, a small section of the exterior wing remained active in France, where it eventually joined the Resistance to German occupation—it included Gheorghe Gaston Marin and the Francs-tireurs' Olga Bancic, Nicolae Cristea and Joseph Boczov.

As Romania came under the rule of Ion Antonescu and, as an Axis country, joined in the German offensive against the Soviets, the Communist Party began approaching traditional parties that were engaged in semi-clandestine opposition to Antonescu: alongside the Social Democrats, it began talks with the National Peasants' and the National Liberal parties. At the time, virtually all the interior leadership was imprisoned at various locations (most of them interned at Caransebeș or in a concentration camp near Târgu Jiu). Some communists, such as Petre Gheorghe, Filimon Sârbu, Francisc Panet or Ștefan Plavăț, tried to establish organised resistance groups; however, they were quickly captured by the Romanian authorities and executed, as were some of the more active propagandists, such as Pompiliu Ștefu. A statistic of the Siguranţa reports that, in Bucharest, between January 1941 and September 1942, 143 individuals were tried for communism, of which 19 were sentenced to death and 78 to prison terms or forced labour. The antisemitic Antonescu regime established a distinction between PCdR members of Jewish Romanian origin and those of ethnic Romanian or other heritage, deporting the majority of the former, alongside Romanian and Bessarabian Jews in general, to camps, prisons and makeshift ghettos in occupied Transnistria (see Holocaust in Romania). Most Jews from the PCdR category were held in Vapniarka, where improper feeding caused an outbreak of paralysis, and in Rîbnița, where some 50 were victims of the authorities' criminal negligence and were shot by retreating German troops in March 1944.

In June 1943, at a time when troops were suffering major defeats on the Eastern Front, the PCdR proposed that all parties form a Blocul Național Democrat ("National Democratic Bloc"), in order to arrange for Romania to withdraw from its alliance with Nazi Germany. The ensuing talks were prolonged by various factors, most notably by the opposition of National Peasants' Party leader Iuliu Maniu, who, alarmed by Soviet successes, was trying to reach a satisfactory compromise with the Western Allies (and, together with the National Liberals' leader Dinu Brătianu, continued to back negotiations initiated by Antonescu and Barbu Știrbey with the United States and the United Kingdom).

==== 1944 Coup ====
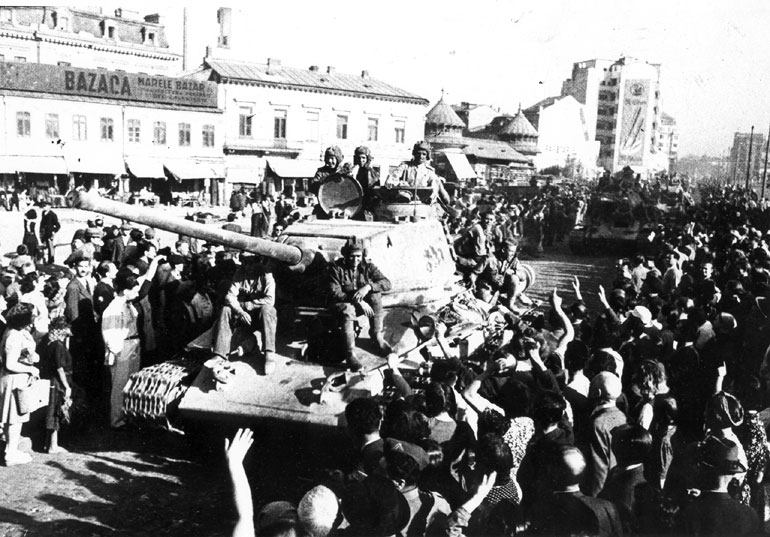
People in Bucharest greet Romania's new ally, the Red Army, on 31 August 1944

In early 1944, as the Red Army reached and crossed the Prut River during the Second Jassy–Kishinev Offensive, the self-confidence and status gained by the PCdR made possible the creation of the Bloc, which was designed as the basis of a future anti-Axis government. Parallel contacts were established, through Lucrețiu Pătrășcanu and Emil Bodnăraș, between the PCdR, the Soviets, and King Michael. A seminal event also occurred during those months: Ștefan Foriș, who was still general secretary, was deposed by with Soviet approval by the rival "prison faction" (at the time, it was headed by former inmates of Caransebeș prison); replaced with the troika formed by Gheorghe Gheorghiu-Dej, Constantin Pîrvulescu, and Iosif Rangheț, Foriș was discreetly assassinated in 1946. Several assessments view Foriș's dismissal as the complete rupture in historical continuity between the PCdR established in 1921 and what became the ruling party of Communist Romania.

On 23 August 1944, King Michael, a number of Romanian Armed Forces officers, and armed Communist-led civilians supported by the National Democratic Bloc arrested dictator Ion Antonescu and seized control of the state (see King Michael's Coup). King Michael then proclaimed the old 1923 Constitution in force, ordered the Romanian Army to enter a ceasefire with the Red Army on the Moldavian front, and withdrew Romania from the Axis. Later party discourse tended to dismiss the importance of both the Soviet offensive and the dialogue with other forces (and eventually described the coup as a revolt with large popular support).

The King named General Constantin Sănătescu as prime minister of a coalition government which was dominated by the military, but included one representative each from the National Liberal Party, National Peasants' Party and Social Democratic Party, with Pătrășcanu as Minister of Justice—the first Communist to hold high office in Romania. The Red Army entered Bucharest on 31 August, and thereafter played a crucial role in supporting the Communist Party's rise to power as the Soviet military command virtually ruled the city and the country (see Soviet occupation of Romania).

==== In opposition to Sănătescu and Rădescu ====
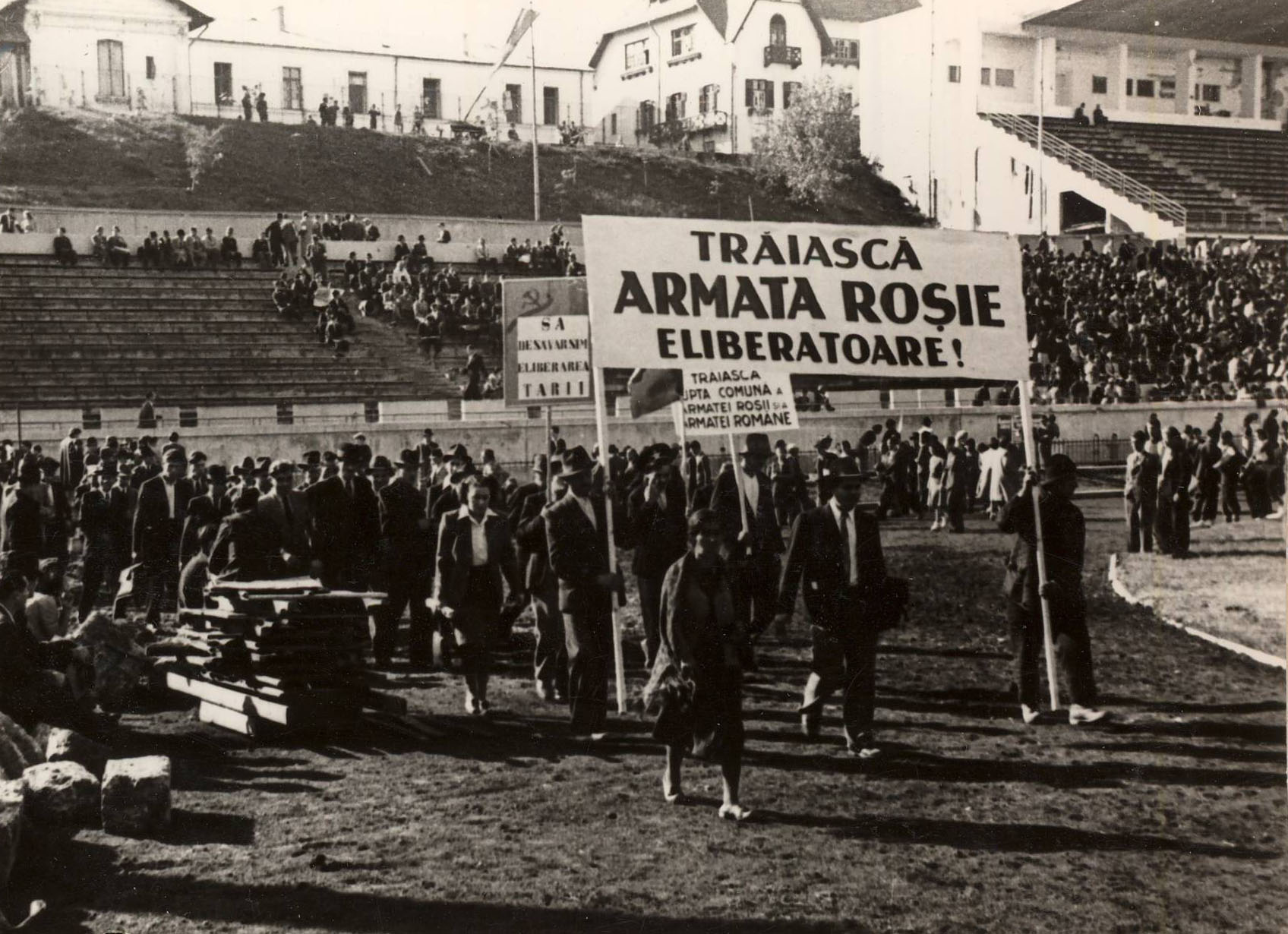
October 1944 rally in support of the National Democratic Front, held at Bucharest's ANEF Stadium

After having been underground for two decades, the Communists enjoyed little popular support at first, compared to the other opposition parties (however, the decrease in popularity of the National Liberals was reflected in the forming of a splinter group around Gheorghe Tătărescu, the National Liberal Party-Tătărescu, who later entered an alliance with the Communist Party). Soon after 23 August, the Communists also engaged in a campaign against Romania's main political group of the time, the National Peasants' Party, and its leaders Iuliu Maniu and Ion Mihalache. In Victor Frunză's account, the conflict's first stage was centered on Communist allegations that Maniu had encouraged violence against the Hungarian community in newly recovered Northern Transylvania.

The Communist Party, engaged in a massive recruitment campaign, was able to attract ethnic Romanians in large numbers—workers and intellectuals alike, including some former members of the fascist Iron Guard. By 1947, it grew to around 710,000 members. Although the PCR was still highly disorganized and factionalized, it benefited from Soviet backing (including that of Vladislav Petrovich Vinogradov and other Soviet appointees to the Allied Commission). After 1944, it was leading a paramilitary wing, the Patriotic Defense (Apărarea Patriotică, disbanded in 1948), and a cultural society, the Romanian Society for Friendship with the Soviet Union.

On PCdR initiative, the National Democratic Bloc was dissolved on 8 October 1944; instead, the Communists, Social Democrats, the Ploughmen's Front, Mihai Ralea's Socialist Peasants' Party (which was absorbed by the former in November), the Hungarian People's Union (MADOSZ), and Mitiţă Constantinescu's Union of Patriots formed the National Democratic Front (FND), which campaigned against the government, demanding the appointment of more Communist officials and sympathizers, while claiming democratic legitimacy and alleging that Sănătescu had dictatorial ambitions. The FND was soon joined by the Liberal group around Tătărescu, Nicolae L. Lupu's Democratic Peasants' Party (the latter claimed the legacy from the defunct Peasants' Party), and Anton Alexandrescu's faction (separated from the National Peasants' Party).

Sănătescu resigned in November, but was persuaded by King Michael to form a second government which collapsed within weeks. General Nicolae Rădescu was asked to form a government and appointed Teohari Georgescu to the Ministry of the Interior, which allowed for the introduction of Communists into the security forces. The Communist Party subsequently launched a campaign against the Rădescu government, including the mass demonstration of 24 February that resulted in four deaths among the participants. According to Frunză, this culminated in a 13 February 1945 demonstration outside the Royal Palace, and followed a week later by street fighting between Georgescu's Communist forces and supporters of the National Peasants' Party in Bucharest. In a period of escalating chaos, Rădescu called for elections. The Soviet deputy foreign minister Andrey Vyshinsky went to Bucharest to request the monarch that he appoint Communist sympathizer Petru Groza as Prime Minister, with the Soviet government suggesting it would reinstate Romanian sovereignty over Northern Transylvania only in such a scenario. Frunză claimed however that Vyshinsky also intimated a Soviet takeover of the country if the King failed to comply, and that, under pressure from Soviet troops who were supposedly disarming the Romanian military and occupying key installations, Michael agreed and dismissed Rădescu, who fled the country.

==== First Groza cabinet ====
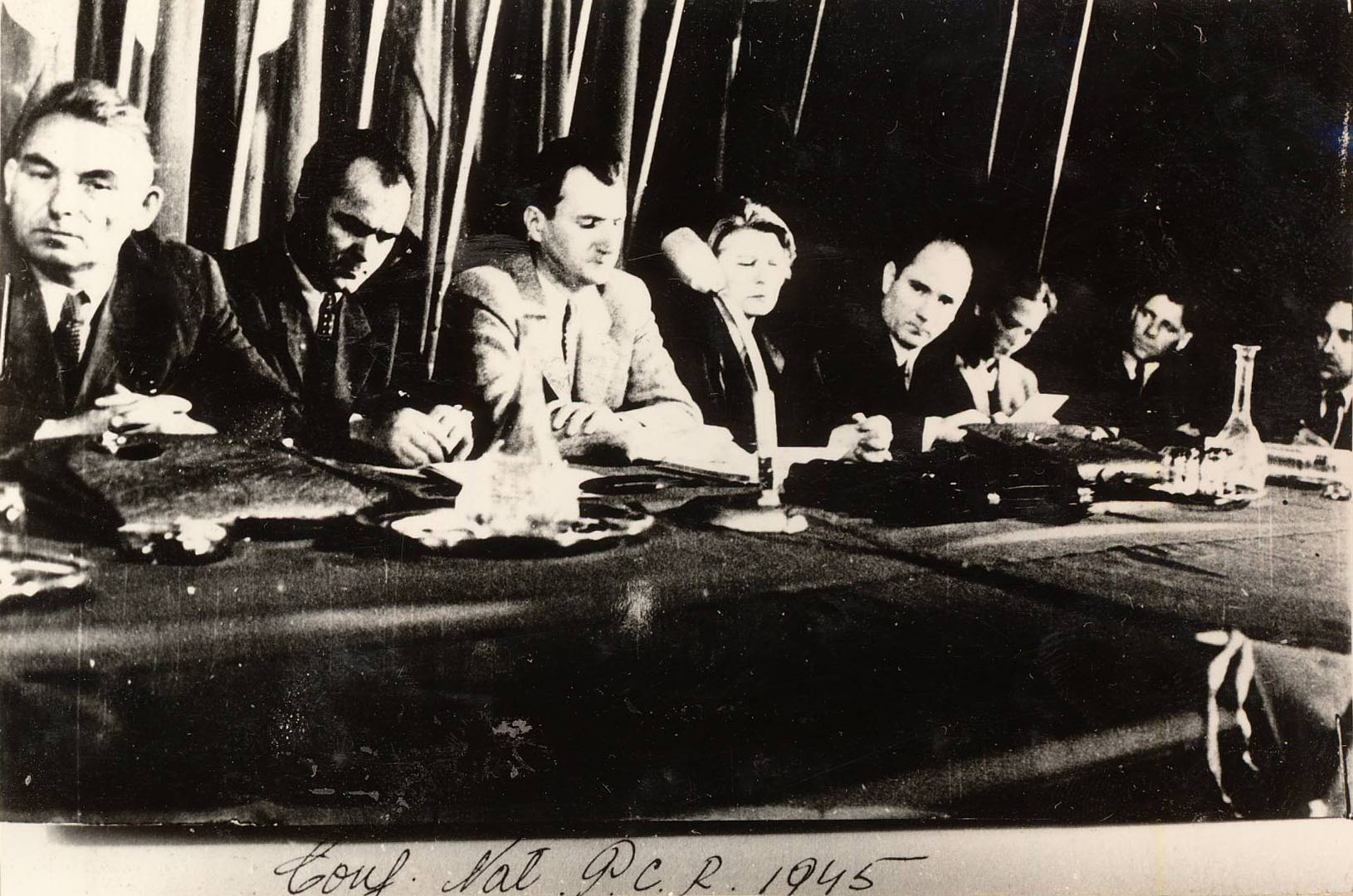
The Communist Party's National Conference of October 1945. Pictured, left to right: Vasile Luca, Constantin Pîrvulescu, Lucrețiu Pătrășcanu, Ana Pauker, Teohari Georgescu, Florica Bagdasar and Gheorghe Vasilichi

On 6 March, Groza became leader of a Communist-led government and named Communists to lead the Romanian Armed Forces as well as the ministries of the Interior (Georgescu), Justice (Lucrețiu Pătrășcanu), Communications (Gheorghe Gheorghiu-Dej), Propaganda (Petre Constantinescu-Iaşi) and Finance (Vasile Luca). The non-Communist ministers came from the Social Democrats (who were falling under the control of the pro-Communists Lothar Rădăceanu and Ștefan Voitec) and the traditional Ploughmen's Front ally, as well as, nominally, from the National Peasants' and National Liberal parties (followers of Tătărescu and Alexandrescu's dissident wings).

As a result of the Potsdam Conference, where Western Allied governments refused to recognize Groza's administration, King Michael called on Groza to resign. When he refused, the monarch went to his summer home in Sinaia and refused to sign any government decrees or bills (a period colloquially known as greva regală—"the royal strike"). Following Anglo-American mediation, Groza agreed to include politicians from outside his electoral alliance, appointing two secondary figures in their parties (the National Liberal Mihail Romniceanu and the National Peasants' Emil Hațieganu) as Ministers without Portfolio (January 1946). At the time, Groza's party and the PCR came to disagree on some issues (with the Front publicly affirming its support for private land ownership), before the Ploughmen's Front was eventually pressured into supporting Communist tenets.

In the meantime, the first measure taken by the cabinet was a new land reform that advertised, among others, an interest into peasant issues and a respect for property (in front of common fears that a Leninist program was about to be adopted). According to Frunză, although contrasted by the Communist press with its previous equivalent, the measure was supposedly much less relevant—land awarded to individual farmers in 1923 was more than three times the 1945 figures, and all effects were canceled by the 1948–1962 collectivization.

It was also then that, through Pătrășcanu and Alexandru Drăghici, the Communists consecrated their control of the legal system—the process included the creation of the Romanian People's Tribunals, charged with investigating war crimes, and constantly supported by agitprop in the Communist press. During the period, government-backed Communists used various means to exercising influence over the vast majority of the press, and began infiltrating or competing with independent cultural forums. Economic dominance, partly responding to Soviet requirements, was first effected through the SovRoms (created in the summer of 1945), directing the bulk of Romanian trade towards the Soviet Union.

==== 1945 restructuring and second Groza cabinet ====
The Communist Party held its first open conference (16–22 October 1945, at the Mihai Viteazul High School in Bucharest) and agreed to replace the Gheorghe Gheorghiu-Dej–Constantin Pîrvulescu–Iosif Rangheț troika with a joint leadership reflecting an uneasy balance between the external and internal wings: while Gheorghiu-Dej retained his general secretary position, Ana Pauker, Teohari Georgescu, and Vasile Luca became the other main leaders.

The Central Committee had 27 full members

- Gheorghe Apostol
- Emil Bodnăraș
- Constantin Câmpeanu
- Nicolae Ceaușescu
- Iosif Chișinevschi
- Miron Constantinescu – Politburo member
- Dumitru Coliu
- Constanța Crăciun
- Teohari Georgescu – Politburo member, Secretary
- Gheorghe Gheorghiu-Dej – Politburo member, Secretary
- Vasile Luca – Politburo member, Secretary
- Gheorghe Maurer
- Vasile Mârza
- Alexandru Moghioroș
- Andrei Neagu
- Constantin Pârvulescu – President of Central Control Commission
- Lucrețiu Pătrășcanu
- Andrei Pătrașcu
- Ana Pauker – Politburo member, Secretary
- Emil Popa
- Ilie Popa
- Iosif Rangheț
- Leontin Silaghi
- Chivu Stoica – Politburo member
- Elena Tudorache
- Vasile Vaida
- Gheorghe Vasilichi – Politburo member

and 8 candidate members

- Liuba Chișinevschi
- Ilie Drăgan
- Alexandru Drăghici
- Dumitru Focșăneanu
- Mihai Mujic
- Ion Petre
- Gheorghe Radnev
- Mihail Roșianu

The post-1945 constant growth in membership, by far the highest of all Eastern Bloc countries, was to provide a base of support for Gheorghiu-Dej. The conference also saw the first mention of the PCdR as the Romanian Communist Party (PCR), the new name being used as a propaganda tool suggesting a closer connection with the national interest.

Party control over the security forces was successfully used on 8 November 1945, when the opposition parties organised a demonstration in front of the Royal Palace to express solidarity with King Michael, who was still refusing to sign his name to new legislation, on the occasion of his name day. Demonstrators were faced with gunshots; around 10 people were killed, and many wounded. The official account, according to which the Groza government responded to a coup attempt, was disputed by Frunză.

The PCR and its allies, grouped in the Bloc of Democratic Parties, won the Romanian elections of 19 November, although there is evidence of widespread electoral fraud. Years later, historian Petre Ţurlea reviewed an incomplete confidential PCR report about the election that confirmed the Bloc won around 48 percent of the vote. He concluded that had the election been conducted fairly, the opposition parties could have won enough votes between them to form a coalition government, albeit with far less than the 80 percent support opposition supporters long claimed.

The following months were dedicated to confronting the National Peasants' Party, which was annihilated after the Tămădău Affair and show trial of its entire leadership. On 30 December 1947, the Communist Party's power was consolidated when King Michael was forced to abdicate. The Communist-dominated legislature then abolished the monarchy and proclaimed Romania a "People's Republic", firmly aligned with the Soviet Union. According to the king, his signature was obtained after the Groza cabinet representatives threatened to kill 1,000 students they had rounded up in custody.

=== Romanian Workers' Party (1948–1965) ===
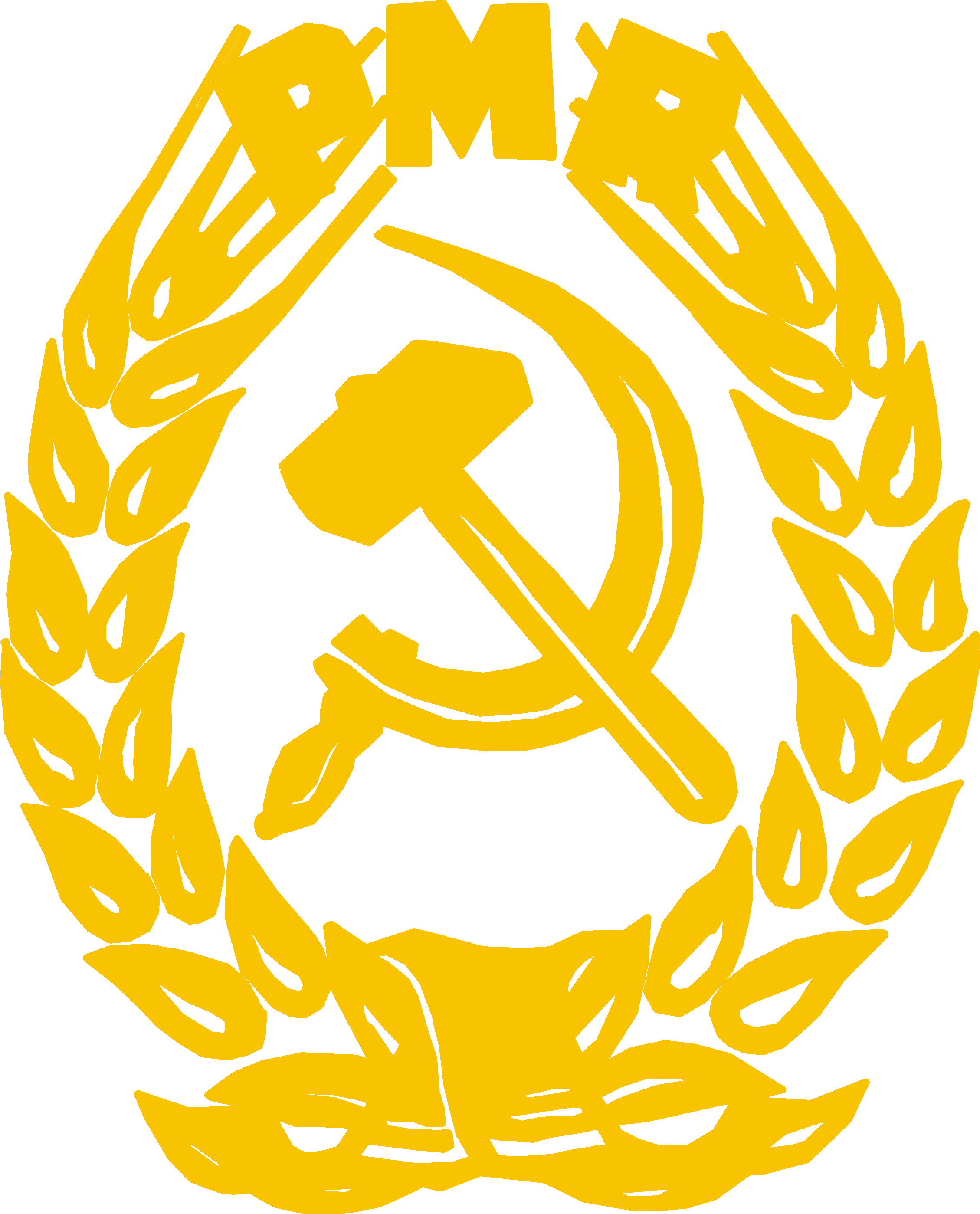
Romanian Workers' Party logo

==== Creation ====
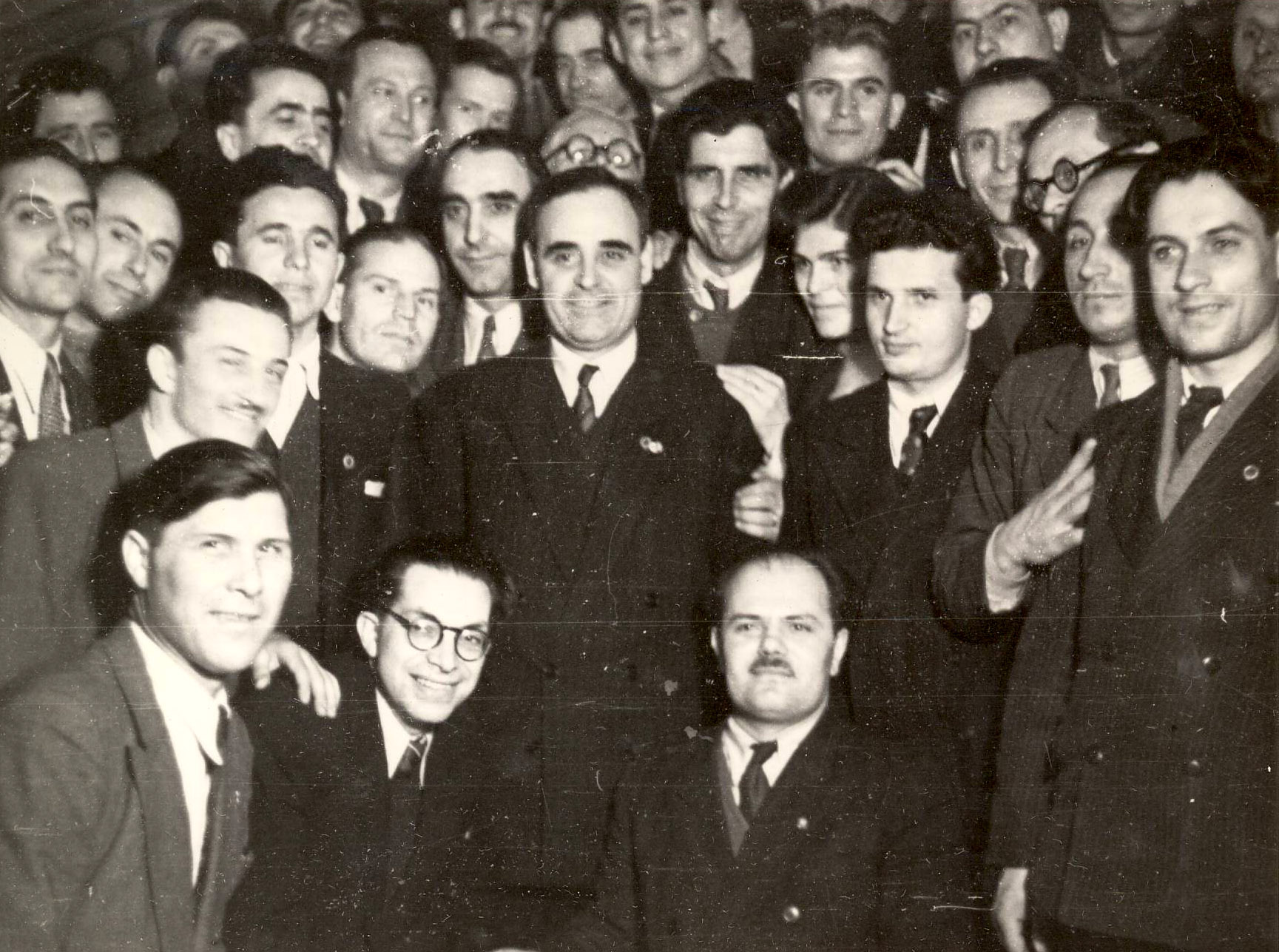
Gheorghe Gheorghiu-Dej with delegates to the February 1948 PCR congress (the young Nicolae Ceaușescu stands to his left)

In February 1948, the Communists ended a long process of infiltrating the Romanian Social Democratic Party (ensuring control through electoral alliances and the two-party Frontul Unic Muncitoresc—Singular Workers' Front, the PCR had profited from the departure of Constantin Titel Petrescu's group from the Social Democrats in March 1946). The Social Democrats merged with the PCR to form the Romanian Workers' Party (Partidul Muncitoresc Român, PMR) which remained the ruling party's official name until 24 July 1965 (when it returned to the designation as Romanian Communist Party). Nevertheless, Social Democrats were excluded from most party posts and were forced to support Communist policies on the basis of democratic centralism; it was also reported that only half of the PSD's 500,000 members joined the newly founded grouping. Capitalizing on these gains, the Communist government shunted most of the remaining parties aside after the 1948 elections (the Ploughmen's Front and the Hungarian People's Union dissolved themselves in 1953). The PMR fought the elections as the dominant partner of the People's Democratic Front (FND), which won with 93.2 percent of the vote. By then, however, the FND had taken on the same character as other "popular fronts"in the Soviet bloc. The member parties became completely subservient to the PMR, and had to accept its"leading role"as a condition of their continued existence. Groza, however, remained Prime Minister.

A new series of economic changes followed: the National Bank of Romania was passed into full public ownership (December 1946), and, in order to combat the Romanian leu's devaluation, a surprise monetary reform was imposed as a stabilization measure in August 1947 (severely limiting the amount convertible by people without an actual job, primarily members of the aristocracy). The Marshall Plan was being overtly condemned, while nationalization and a planned economy were enforced beginning 11 June 1948. The first five-year plan, conceived by Miron Constantinescu's Soviet-Romanian committee, was adopted in 1950. Of newly enforced measures, the arguably most far-reaching was collectivization—by 1962, when the process was considered complete, 96% of the total arable land had been enclosed in collective farming, while around 80,000 peasants faced trial for resisting and 17,000 others were uprooted or deported for being chiaburi (the Romanian equivalent of kulaks). Chiaburs were defined by the Party as the common enemies of communism in Romania. Thus, they were subjected to abuses by the cadres. In 1950, the party, which viewed itself as the vanguard of the working class, reported that people of proletarian origin held 64% of party offices and 40% of higher government posts, while results of the recruitment efforts remained below official expectations.

==== Internal purges ====
During the period, the central scene of the PMR was occupied by the conflict between the "Muscovite wing", the "prison wing" led by Gheorghe Gheorghiu-Dej, and the newly emerged and weaker "Secretariat wing" led by Lucrețiu Pătrășcanu. After October 1945, the two former groups had associated in neutralizing Pătrășcanu's—exposed as "bourgeois" and progressively marginalized, it was ultimately decapitated in 1948. Beginning that year, the PMR leadership officially questioned its own political support, and began a massive campaign to remove "foreign and hostile elements" from its rapidly expanded structures. In 1952, with Stalin's renewed approval, Gheorghiu-Dej emerged victorious from the confrontation with Ana Pauker, his chief "Muscovite" rival, as well as purging Vasile Luca, Teohari Georgescu, and their supporters from the party—alleging that their various political attitudes were proof of "right-wing deviationism". Out of a membership of approximately one million, between 300,000 and 465,000 members, almost half of the party, was removed in the successive purges. The specific target for the "verification campaign", as it was officially called, were former Iron Guard affiliates.

The move against Pauker's group echoed Stalinist purges of Jews in particular from other Communist Parties in the Eastern bloc—notably, the anti-"Cosmopolitan" campaign in which Joseph Stalin targeted Jews in the Soviet Union, and the Prague Trials in Czechoslovakia which removed Jews from leading positions in that country's Communist government. At the same time, a new republican constitution, replacing its 1948 precedent, legislated Stalinist tenets, and proclaimed that "the people's democratic state is consistently carrying out the policy of enclosing and eliminating capitalist elements". Gheorghiu-Dej, who remained an orthodox Stalinist, took the position of Premier while moving Groza to the presidency of the Presidium of the Great National Assembly (de facto President of the People's Republic). Executive and PMR leaderships remained in Gheorghiu-Dej's hands until his death in 1965 (with the exception of 1954–1955, when his office of PMR leader was taken over by Gheorghe Apostol).

From the moment it came to power and until Stalin's death, as the Cold War erupted, the PMR endorsed Soviet requirements for the Eastern Bloc. Aligning the country with the Cominform, it officially condemned Josip Broz Tito's independent actions in Yugoslavia; Tito was routinely attacked by the official press, and the Romanian-Yugoslav Danube border became the scene of massive agitprop displays (see Tito–Stalin split and Informbiro).

==== Gheorghiu-Dej and de-Stalinization ====
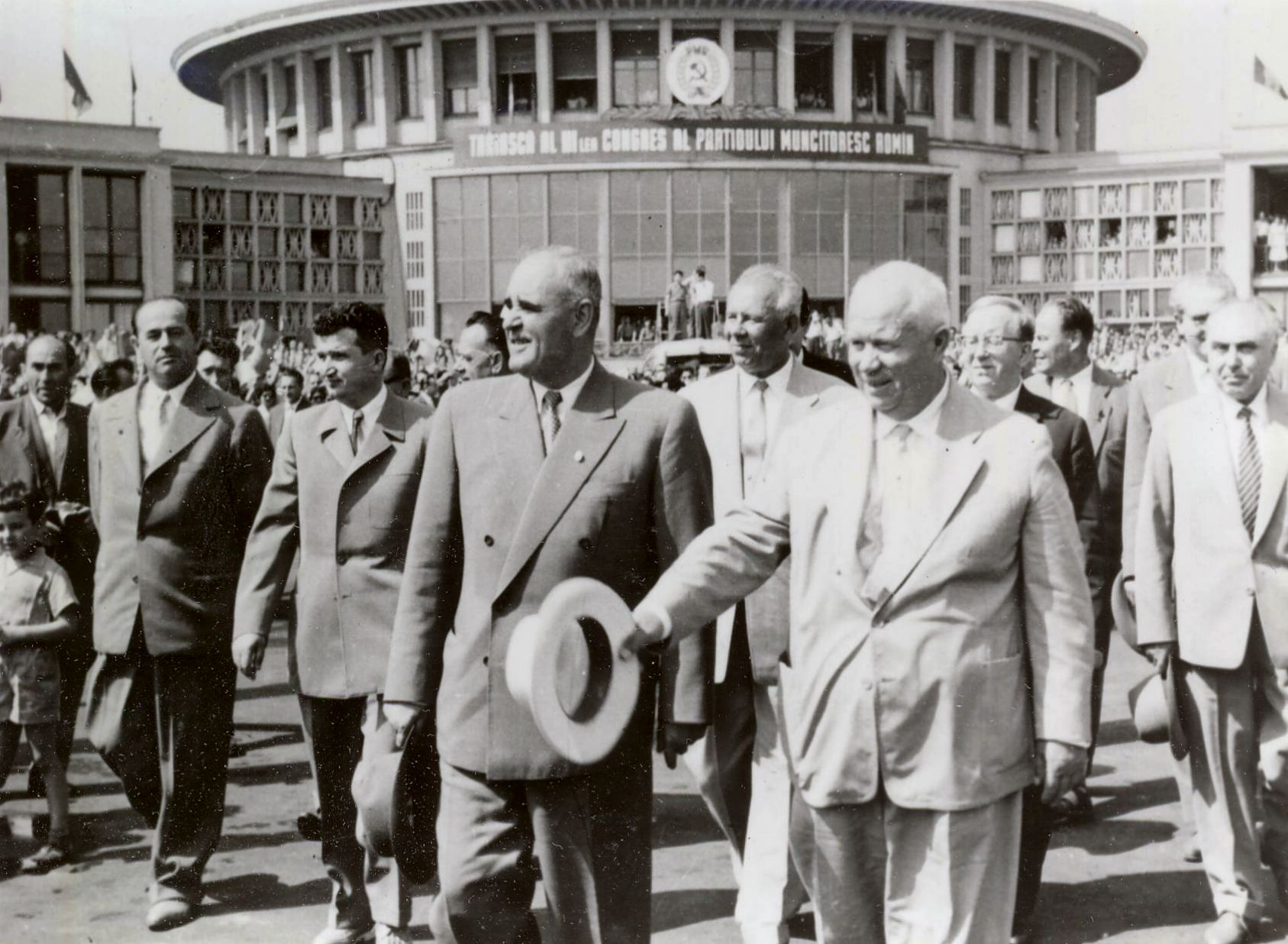
Gheorghe Gheorghiu-Dej (front row, left) seeing off Nikita Khrushchev (front row, right) at Bucharest's Băneasa Airport upon the close of the PMR's 3rd Congress (June 1960). Nicolae Ceauşescu can be seen at Gheorghiu-Dej's right hand side.

Uncomfortable and possibly threatened by the reformist measures adopted by Stalin's successor, Nikita Khrushchev, Gheorghiu-Dej began to steer Romania towards a more "independent" path while remaining within the Soviet orbit during the late 1950s. Following the Twentieth Party Congress of the Communist Party of the Soviet Union, in which Khurshchev initiated De-Stalinization, Gheorghiu-Dej issued propaganda accusing Pauker, Luca and Georgescu of having been an arch-Stalinists responsible for the party's excesses in the late 1940s and early 1950s (notably, in regard to collectivization)—despite the fact that they had occasionally opposed a number of radical measures advocated by the General Secretary. After that purge, Gheorghiu-Dej had begun promoting PMR activists who were perceived as more loyal to his own political views; among them were Nicolae Ceauşescu, Gheorghe Stoica, Ghizela Vass, Grigore Preoteasa, Alexandru Bârlădeanu, Ion Gheorghe Maurer, Gheorghe Gaston Marin, Paul Niculescu-Mizil, and Gheorghe Rădulescu; in parallel, citing Khrushchevite precedents, the PMR briefly reorganized its leadership on a plural basis (1954–1955), while Gheorghiu-Dej reshaped party doctrine to include ambiguous messages about Stalin's legacy (insisting on the defunct Soviet's leader contribution to Marxist thought, official documents also deplored his personality cult and encouraged Stalinists to self-criticism).

In this context, the PMR soon dismissed all the relevant consequences of the Twentieth Soviet Congress, and Gheorghiu-Dej even argued that De-Stalinization had been imposed by his team right after 1952. At a party meeting in March 1956, two members of the Politburo who were supporters of Khruschevite reforms, Miron Constantinescu and Iosif Chişinevschi, criticized Gheorghiu-Dej's leadership and identified him with Romanian Stalinism. They were purged in 1957, themselves accused of being Stalinists and of having been plotting with Pauker. Through Ceaușescu's voice, Gheorghiu-Dej also marginalized another group of old members of the PMR, associated with Constantin Doncea (June 1958).

On the outside too, the PMR, leading a country that had joined the Warsaw Pact, remained an agent of political repression: it fully supported Khurshchev's invasion of Hungary in response to the Revolution of 1956, after which Imre Nagy and other dissident Hungarian leaders were imprisoned on Romanian soil. The Hungarian rebellion also sparked student protests in such places as Bucharest, Timișoara, Oradea, Cluj and Iași, which contributed to unease inside the PMR and resulted in a wave of arrests. While refusing to allow dissemination of Soviet literature exposing Stalinism (writers such as Ilya Ehrenburg and Aleksandr Solzhenitsyn), Romanian leaders took active part in the campaign against Boris Pasternak.

Despite Stalin's death, the massive police apparatus headed by the Securitate (created in 1949 and rapidly growing in numbers) maintained a steady pace in its suppression of "class enemies", until as late as 1962–1964. In 1962–1964, the party leadership approved a mass amnesty, extended to, among other prisoners, ca. 6,700 guilty of political crimes. This marked a toning down in the violence and scale of repression, after almost twenty years during which the Party had acted against political opposition and active anti-communist resistance, as well as against religious institutions (most notably, the Romanian Roman Catholic and Greek-Catholic Churches). Estimates for the total number of victims in the 1947/1948-1964 period vary significantly: as low as 160,000 or 282,000 political prisoners, and as high 600,000 (according to one estimate, about 190,000 people were killed or died in custody— ). Notorious penal facilities of the time included the Danube-Black Sea Canal, Sighet, Gherla, Aiud, Pitești, and Râmnicu Sărat; another method of punishment was deportation to the inhospitable Bărăgan Plain.

==== Gheorghiu-Dej and the "national path" ====
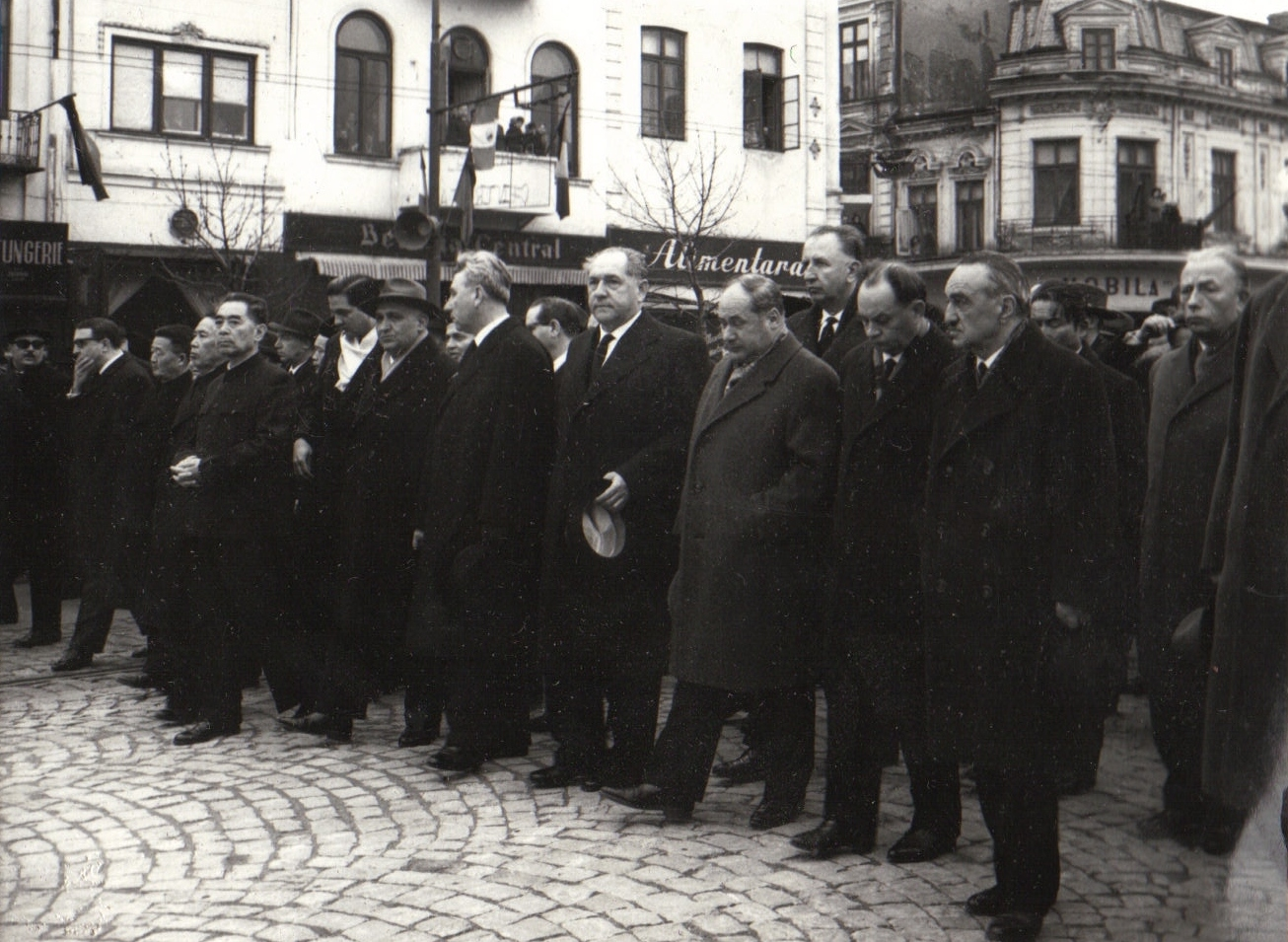
Foreign leaders attending Gheorghe Gheorghiu-Dej's funeral (March 1965). Zhou Enlai and Anastas Mikoyan are among them

Nationalism and national communism penetrated official discourse, largely owing to Gheorghiu-Dej's call for economic independence and distancing from the Comecon. Moves to withdraw the country from Soviet overseeing were taken in quick succession after 1953. Khrushchev allowed Constantinescu to dissolve the SovRoms in 1954, followed by the closing of Romanian-Soviet cultural ventures such as Editura Cartea Rusă at the end of the decade. Industrialization along the PMR's own directives highlighted Romanian independence—one of its consequences was the massive steel-producing industrial complex in Galați, which, being dependent on imports of iron from overseas, was for long a major strain on the Romanian economy. In 1957, Gheorghiu-Dej and Emil Bodnăraş persuaded the Soviets to withdraw their remaining troops from Romanian soil. As early as 1956, Romania's political apparatus reconciled with Josip Broz Tito, which led to a series of common economic projects (culminating in the Iron Gates venture).

A drastic divergence in ideological outlooks manifested itself only after autumn 1961, when the PMR's leadership felt threatened by the Soviet Union's will to impose the condemnation of Stalinism as the standard in communist states. Following the Sino-Soviet split of the late 1950s and the Soviet-Albanian split in 1961, Romania initially gave full support to the Khrushchev's stance, but maintained exceptionally good relations with both Maoist China and Communist Albania. Romanian media was alone among Warsaw Pact countries to report Chinese criticism of the Soviet leadership from its source; in return, Maoist officials complimented Romanian nationalism by supporting the view that Bessarabia had been a traditional victim of Russian imperialism.

The change in policies was to become obvious in 1964, when the Communist regime offered a stiff response to the Valev Plan, a Soviet project of creating trans-national economic units and of assigning Romanian areas the task of supplying agricultural products. Several other measures of that year also presented themselves as radical changes in tone: after Gheorghiu-Dej endorsed Andrei Oţetea's publishing of Karl Marx's Russophobic texts (uncovered by the Polish historian Stanisław Schwann), the PMR itself took a stand against Khrushchevite principles by issuing, in late April, a declaration published in Scînteia, through which it stressed its commitment to a "national path" towards Communism (it read: "There does not and cannot exist a "parent" party and a "son" party or "superior" party and "subordinate" parties"). During late 1964, the PMR's leadership clashed with new Soviet leader Leonid Brezhnev over the issue of KGB advisers still present in the Securitate, and eventually managed to have them recalled, making Romania the Eastern Bloc's first country to have accomplished this.

These actions gave Romania greater freedom in pursuing the program which Gheorghiu-Dej had been committed to since 1954, one allowing Romania to defy reforms in the Eastern Bloc and to maintain a largely Stalinist course. It has also been argued that Romania's emancipation was, in effect, limited to economic relations and military cooperation, being as such dependent on a relatively tolerant mood inside the Soviet Union. Nevertheless, the PMR's nationalism made it increasingly popular with Romanian intellectuals, and the last stage of the Gheorghiu-Dej regime was popularly identified with liberalization.

=== Romanian Communist Party (1965–1989) ===
==== Ceaușescu's rise ====
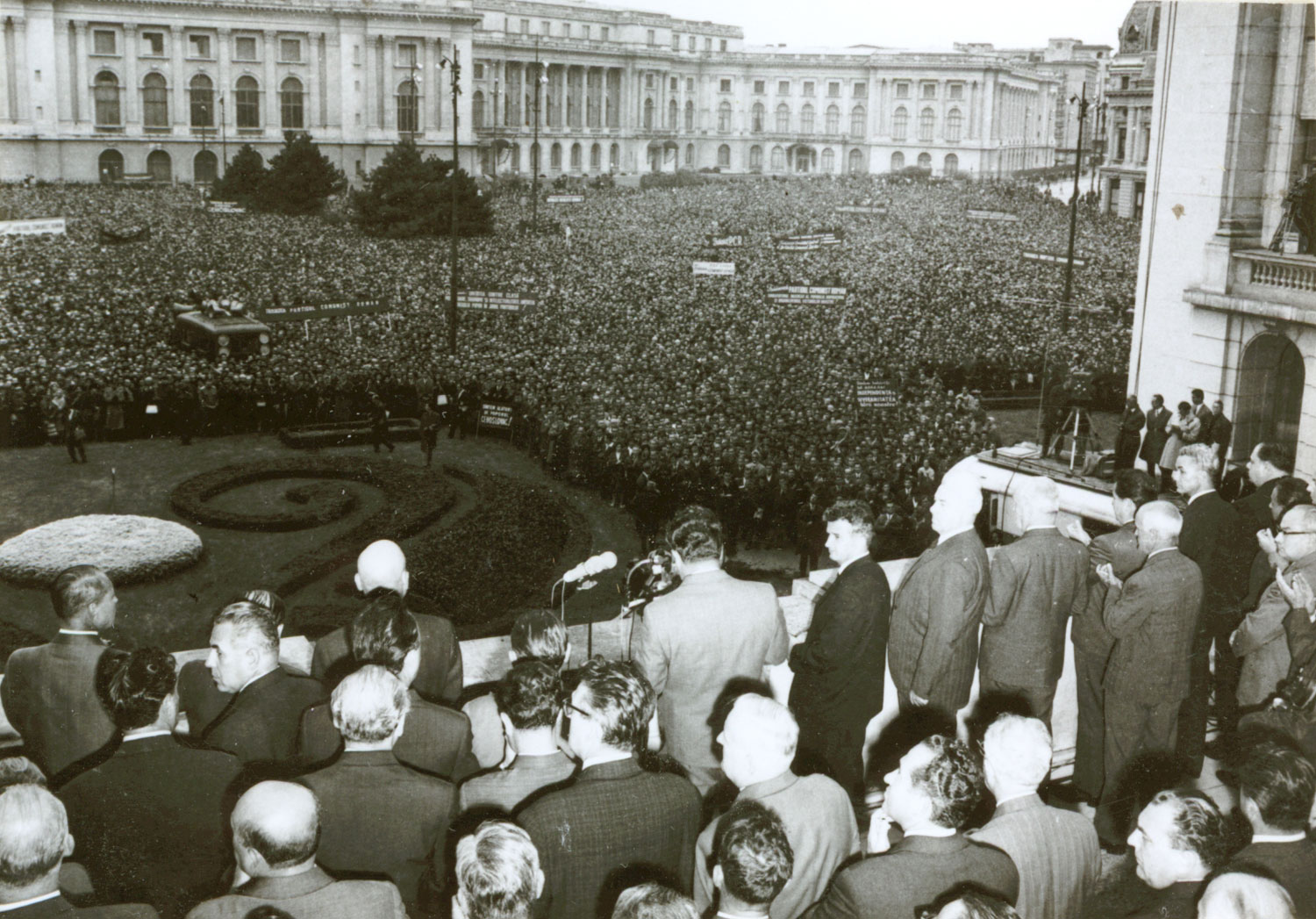
Nicolae Ceaușescu and other PCR leaders in August 1968, addressing the Romanian public at a rally to oppose the invasion of Czechoslovakia

Gheorghiu-Dej died in March 1965 and was succeeded by a collective leadership made up of Nicolae Ceaușescu as general secretary, Chivu Stoica as president and Ion Gheorghe Maurer as Premier. Ceaușescu removed rivals such as Stoica, Alexandru Drăghici, and Gheorghe Apostol from the government, and ultimately from the party leadership, and began accumulating posts for himself. By 1969, he was in complete control of the Central Committee. The circumstances surrounding this process are still disputed, but theories evidence that the support given to him by Ion Gheorghe Maurer and Emil Bodnăraș, as well as the ascendancy of Ilie Verdeț, Virgil Trofin, and Paul Niculescu-Mizil, were instrumental in ensuring legitimacy. Soon after 1965, Ceaușescu used his prerogatives to convoke a Party Commission headed by Ion Popescu-Puțuri, charged with investigating both Stalinist legacy and Gheorghiu-Dej's purges: resulting in the rehabilitation of a large number of Communist officials (including, among others, Ștefan Foriș, Lucrețiu Pătrășcanu, Miron Constantinescu, Vasile Luca, and Romanian victims of the Soviet Great Purge). This measure was instrumental in consolidating the new leadership while further increasing its distance from Gheorghiu-Dej's political legacy.

In 1965, Ceaușescu declared that Romania was no longer a People's Democracy but a Socialist Republic and changed the name of the party back to the Romanian Communist Party—steps which were meant to indicate that Romania was following strict Marxist policies while remaining independent. He continued Romanianization and de-Sovietization efforts by stressing notions such as sovereignty and self-determination. At the time, Ceauşescu made references to Gheorghiu-Dej's own personality cult, while implying that his was to be a new style of leadership. In its official discourse, the PCR introduced the dogmas of "socialist democracy" and direct communication with the masses. From ca. 1965 to 1975, there was a noted rise in the standard of living for the Romanian population as a whole, which was similar to developments in most other Eastern bloc countries. Political scientist Daniel Barbu, who noted that this social improvement trend began ca. 1950 and benefited 45% of the population, concluded that one of its main effects was to increase the citizens' dependency on the state.

A seminal event occurred in August 1968, when Ceaușescu highlighted his anti-Soviet discourse by vocally opposing the Warsaw Pact invasion of Czechoslovakia; a highly popular measure with the Romanian public, it led to sizable enrollments in the PCR and the newly created paramilitary Patriotic Guards (created with the goal of meeting a possible Soviet intervention in Romania). From 1965 to 1976, the PCR rose from approximately 1.4 million members to 2.6 million. In the contingency of an anti-Soviet war, the PCR even sought an alliance with the maverick Yugoslav leader Josip Broz Tito—negotiations did not yield a clear result. Although military intervention in Romania was reportedly taken into consideration by the Soviets, there is indication that Leonid Brezhnev had himself ruled out Romanian participation in Warsaw Pact maneuvers, and that he continued to rely on Ceaușescu's support for other common goals.

While it appears that Romanian leaders genuinely approved of the Prague Spring reforms undertaken by Alexander Dubček, Ceaușescu's gesture also served to consolidate his image as a national and independent communist leader. One year before the invasion of Czechoslovakia, Ceaușescu opened up diplomatic ties with West Germany, and refused to break links with Israel following the Six-Day War. Starting with the much-publicized visit by France's Charles de Gaulle (May 1968), Romania was the recipient of Western world support going well into the 1970s (significant visits were paid by United States Presidents Richard Nixon and Gerald Ford, in 1969 and 1975 respectively, while Ceaușescu was frequently received in Western capitals).

==== Ceaușescu's supremacy ====
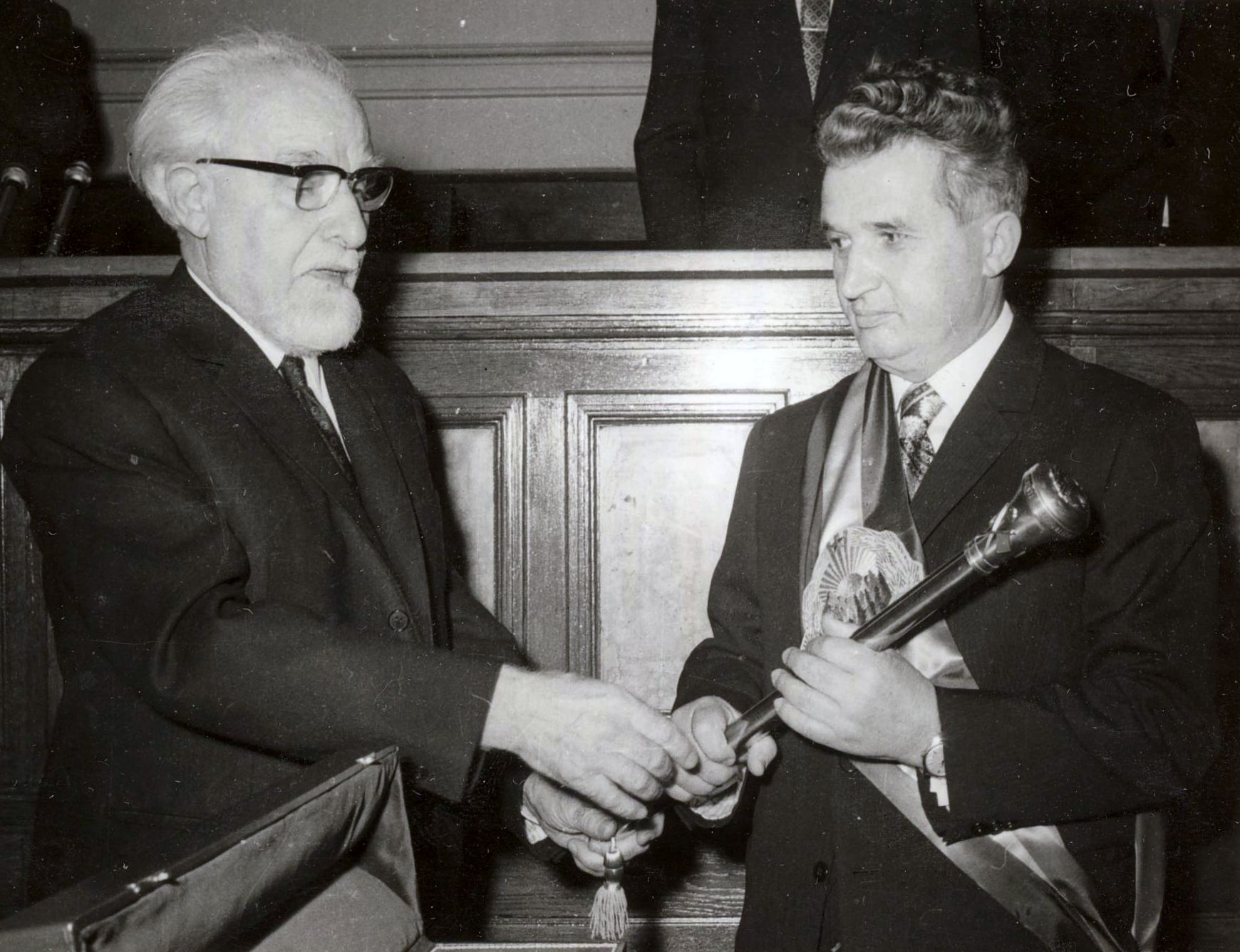
The 1974 ceremony marking Ceaușescu's investiture as President of Romania: Ștefan Voitec handing him the sceptre

Ceaușescu developed a cult of personality around himself and his wife Elena (herself promoted to high offices) after visiting North Korea and noting the parallel developed by Kim Il Sung, while incorporating in it several aspects of past authoritarian regimes in Romania (see Conducător). During the early 1970s, while curbing liberalization, he launched his own version of China's Cultural Revolution, announced by the July Theses. In effect, measures to concentrate power in Ceaușescu's hands were taken as early as 1967, when the general secretary became the ultimate authority on foreign policy.

At the time, a new organization was instituted under the name of Front of Socialist Unity (eventually renamed the Front of Socialist Unity and Democracy). Ostensibly a popular front affiliating virtually all non-party members, it was actually tightly controlled by party activists. It was intended to consolidate the impression that the entire population was backing Ceaușescu's policies. As a result of these new policies, the Central Committee, which acted as the main PCR body between Congresses, had increased to 265 full members and 181 candidate members (supposed to meet at least four times a year). By then, the general secretary also called for women to be enrolled in greater numbers in all party structures. In parallel, the political doctrine in respect to minorities claimed interest in obtaining allegiance from both Hungarians and Germans, and set up separate workers' councils for both communities.

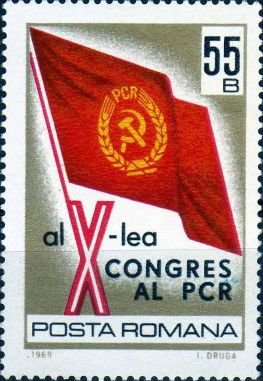
The Xth Party Congress, Romanian stamp from 1969

Members of the upper echelons of the party who objected to Ceaușescu's stance were accused of supporting Soviet policies; they included Alexandru Bârlădeanu, who criticized the heavy loans contracted in support of industrialization policies. In time, the new leader distanced himself from Maurer and Corneliu Mănescu, while his career profited from the deaths of Stoica (who committed suicide) and Sălăjan (who died while undergoing surgery). Instead, he came to rely on a new generation of activists, among them Manea Mănescu.

At the XIth Party Congress in 1974, Gheorghe Cioară, the Mayor of Bucharest, proposed to extend Ceaușescu's office as General Secretary for life, but was turned down by the latter. Shortly before that moment, the collective leadership of the Presidium was replaced with a Political Executive Committee, which, in practice, elected itself; together with the Secretariat, it was controlled by Ceaușescu himself, who was president of both bodies. During the same year, the general secretary also made himself President of the Socialist Republic, following a ceremony during which he was handed a sceptre; this was the first in a succession of titles, also including Conducător ("Leader"), "supreme commander of the Romanian People's Army", "honorary president of the Romanian Academy", and "first among the country's miners". Progressively after 1967, the large bureaucratic structure of the PCR again replicated and interfered with state administration and economic policies. The President himself became noted for frequent visits on location at various enterprises, where he would dispense directives, for which the termed indicații prețioase ("valuable advice") was coined by official propaganda.

Despite the party's independent, "national communist" course, the absolute control that Ceaușescu had over the party and the country, combined with the ubiquity of his personality cult, led to some non-Romanian observers describing the PCR as one of the closest things to an old-style Stalinist party. For instance, Encyclopædia Britannica referred to the last 18 years of Ceaușescu's tenure as a period of "neo-Stalinism", and the last edition of the Country Study on Romania referred to the PCR's "Stalinist repression of individual liberties."

==== Late 1970s crisis ====
The renewed industrialization, which based itself on both a dogmatic understanding of Marxian economics and a series of autarkic goals, brought major economic problems to Romania, beginning with the effects of the 1973 oil crisis, and worsened by the 1979 energy crisis. The profound neglect of services and decline in quality of life, first manifested when much of the budget was diverted to support an over-sized industry, was made more drastic by the political decision to pay in full the country's external debt (in 1983, this was set at 10 billion United States dollars, of which 4.5 billion was accumulated interest). By March 1989, the debt had been paid in full.

Two other programs initiated under Ceaușescu had massive consequences on social life. One of them was the plan, announced as early as 1965, to "systemize rural areas", which was meant to urbanize Romania at a fast pace (of over 13,000 communes, the country was supposed to be left with 6,000); it also brought massive changes for the cities—especially Bucharest, where, following the 1977 earthquake and successive demolitions, new architectural guidelines were imposed (see Ceaușima). By 1966, Romania outlawed abortion, and, progressively after that, measures were endorsed to artificially increase the birth rate—including special taxes for childless couples. Another measure, going hand in hand with economic ones, allowed ethnic Germans a chance to leave Romania and settle in West Germany as Auslandsdeutsche, in return for payments from the latter country. Overall, around 200,000 Germans left, most of them Transylvanian Saxons and Banat Swabians.

Although Romania adhered to the Organization for Security and Co-operation in Europe (1973) and signed the 1975 Helsinki Final Act, Ceauşescu also intensified political repression in the country (beginning in 1971). This took a drastic turn in 1977, when, confronted with Paul Goma's movement in support for Charter 77, the regime expelled him and others from the country. A more serious disobedience occurred in August of the same year, when Jiu Valley miners went on strike, briefly took hold of Premier Ilie Verdeţ, and, despite having reached an agreement with the government, were repressed and some of them expelled (see Jiu Valley miners' strike of 1977). A newly created and independent trade union, SLOMR, was crushed and its leaders arrested on various charges in 1979. Progressively during the period, the Securitate relied on involuntary commitment to psychiatric hospitals as a means to punish dissidence.

==== 1980s ====
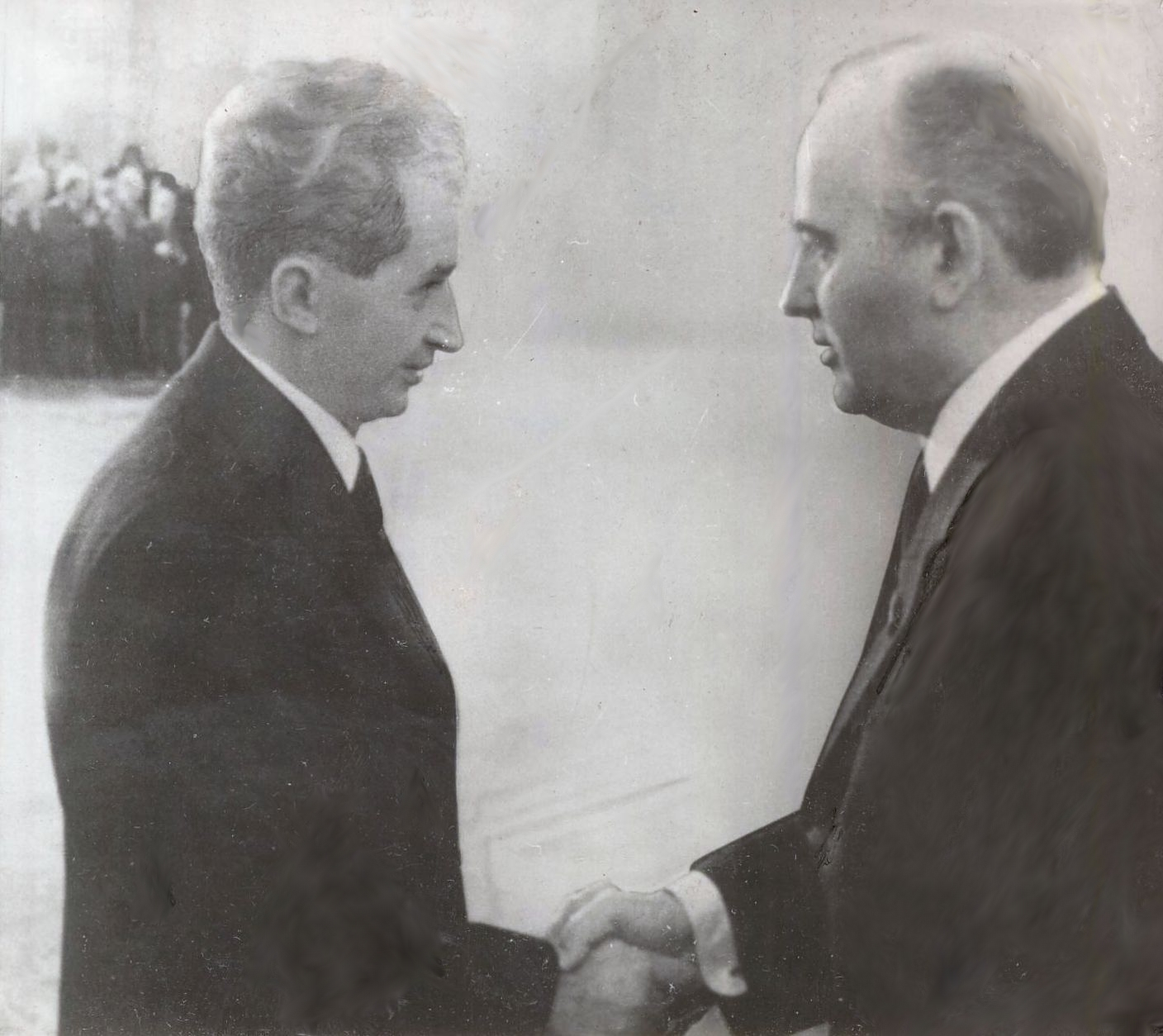
Ceaușescu and Mikhail Gorbachev in 1985

A major act of discontent occurred inside the party during its XIIth Congress in late November 1979, when PCR veteran Constantin Pîrvulescu spoke out against Ceaușescu's policy of discouraging discussions and relying on obedient cadres (he was subsequently heckled, evicted from the Congress hall, and isolated). In 1983, Radu Filipescu, an engineer working in Bucharest, was imprisoned after distributing 20,000 leaflets which called for a popular rally against the regime, while a protests of miners in Maramureș County against wage cuts was broken up by Securitate forces; three years later a strike organized by Romanian and Hungarian industrial workers in Turda and Cluj-Napoca met with the same result. Also in 1983, fearing the multiplication of samizdat documents, Minister of the Interior George Homoștean ordered all citizens to hand over their typewriters to the authorities. This coincided with a noted popular rise in support for outspoken dissidents who were kept under house arrest, among whom were Doina Cornea and Mihai Botez.

By 1983, membership of the PCR had risen to 3.3 million, and, in 1989, to 3.7–3.8 million—meaning that, in the end, over 20% of Romanian adults were party members, making the PCR the largest communist group of the Eastern Bloc after the Communist Party of the Soviet Union. 64,200 basic party units, answering to county committees, varying in number and representing various areas of Romanian society, were officially recorded in 1980. Statistics also indicated that, during the transition from the 1965 PMR (with 8% of the total population) to the 1988 PCR, the membership of workers had grown from 44 to 55%, while that of peasants had dropped from 34 to 15%. In the end, these records contrasted the fact that the PCR had become completely subservient to its leader and no longer had any form of autonomous activity, while membership became a basic requirement in numerous social contexts, leading to purely formal allegiances and political clientelism.

At the same time, the ideological viewpoint was changed, with the party no longer seen as the vanguard of the working class, but as the main social factor and the embodiment of the national interest. In marked contrast with the Perestroika and Glasnost policies developed in the Soviet Union by Mikhail Gorbachev, Romania adopted Neo-Stalinist principles in both its internal policies and its relations with the outside world.

As recorded in 1984, 90% of the PCR members were ethnic Romanians, with 7% Hungarians (the latter group's membership had dropped by more than 2% since the previous Congress). Formal criticism of the new policies regarding minorities had also been voiced by Hungarian activists, including Károly Király, leader of the PCR in Covasna County. After 1980, the nationalist ideology adopted by the PCR progressively targeted the Hungarian community as a whole, based on suspicions of its allegiance to Hungary, whose policies had become diametrically opposed to the methods of Romanian leaders (see Goulash Communism).

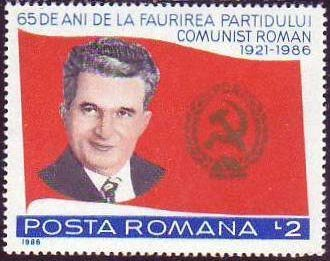
The 65th anniversary of the PCR

Especially during the 1980s, clientelism was further enhanced by a new policy, rotația cadrelor ("cadre rotation" or "reshuffling"), placing strain on low-level officials to seek the protection of higher placed ones as a means to preserve their position or to be promoted. This effectively prompted activists who did not approve of the change in tone to retire, while others—Virgil Trofin, Ion Iliescu and Paul Niculescu-Mizil among them—were officially dispatched to low-ranking positions or otherwise marginalized. In June 1988, the leadership of the Political Executive Committee was reduced from 15 to 7 members, including Nicolae Ceaușescu and his wife.

While some elements of the PCR were receptive to Mikhail Gorbachev's reforms, Ceaușescu himself wanted nothing to do with glasnost or perestroika. As a result, the PCR remained an obstinate bastion of hardline Communism. Gorbachev's distaste for Ceaușescu was well known; he even went as far as to call Ceaușescu "the Romanian führer. "In Gorbachev's mind, Ceaușescu was part of a "Gang of Four" inflexibly hardline leaders unwilling to make the reforms he felt necessary to save Communism, along with Czechoslovakia's Gustáv Husák, Bulgaria's Todor Zhivkov and East Germany's Erich Honecker. At a meeting between the two, Gorbachev upbraided Ceaușescu for his inflexible attitude. "You are running a dictatorship here," the Soviet leader warned. However, Ceaușescu refused to bend.

The XIVth Congress was the last meeting of the part from 20 to 24 November 1989.

==== Downfall ====
Announced by a February 1987 protest of workers and students in Iași, the final crisis of the PCR and its regime began in the autumn, when industrial employees in Brașov called a strike that immediately drew echoes with the city's population (see Brașov Rebellion). In December, authorities convened a public kangaroo trial of the movement's leaders, and handed out sentences of imprisonment and internal exile.

Inaugurated by Silviu Brucan's public criticism of the Braşov repression, and inspired by the impact of changes in other Eastern Bloc countries, protests of marginalized PCR activists became notorious after March 1989, when Brucan and Pârvulescu, together with Gheorghe Apostol, Alexandru Bârlădeanu, Grigore Răceanu and Corneliu Mănescu, sent Ceaușescu their so-called Letter of the Six, publicized over Radio Free Europe. At around the same time, systematization provoked an international response, as Romania was subjected to a resolution of the United Nations Commission on Human Rights, which called for an inquiry into the state of ethnic minorities and the rural population; the political isolation experienced by Communist Romania was highlighted by the fact that Hungary endorsed the report, while all other Eastern bloc countries abstained. This followed more than a decade of deteriorating relations between the PCR and the Hungarian Socialist Workers' Party.

In the face of the changes that unfolded in the rest of Eastern Europe in 1988 and 1989, the PCR retained its image as one of the most unreconstructed parties in the Soviet bloc. It even went as far as to call for a Warsaw Pact invasion of Poland after that country's Communists announced a power-sharing agreement with the Solidarity trade union—a sharp reversal of its previous opposition to the Brezhnev Doctrine and its vehement opposition to the invasion of Czechoslovakia 21 years earlier. It initially appeared that the PCR would ride out the anti-Communist tide sweeping through Eastern Europe when on 24 November—two weeks after the fall of the Berlin Wall and the same day that Communist rule effectively ended in Czechoslovakia—Ceaușescu was reelected for another five-year term as General Secretary.

A month later, both Ceaușescu and the party were overthrown in the Romanian Revolution of December 1989, begun as a popular rebellion in Timișoara and eventually bringing to power the National Salvation Front, comprising a large number of moderate former PCR members who supported Gorbachev's vision. Having fled the PCR's headquarters under pressure from demonstrators, Ceauşescu and his wife were captured, tried, and executed by the new authorities in Târgoviște. No formal dissolution of the PCR took place. Rather, the party simply disappeared. The speed with which the PCR, one of the largest parties of its kind, dissolved, as well as its spontaneity, were held by commentators as additional proof that its sizable membership presented a largely false image of its true beliefs. In nearly every other Eastern Bloc country, the former ruling Communist parties recast themselves into social democratic or democratic socialist parties, and remain major players to this day.

Many former members of the PCR have been major players in the post-1989 political scene. For example, until 2014 every post-revolution president had formerly been a member of the PCR. Among other small parties an unregistered party of the same name and the small Romanian Socialist Party claim to be the successors of the PCR, with the latter entering Parliament in the 1992–1996 legislature under its former name of Socialist Party of Labour.

== General secretaries (1921–1989) ==
- Gheorghe Cristescu (1921–1924)
- Elek Köblös (1924–1927)
- Vitali Holostenco (1927–1931)
- Alexander Danieliuk-Stefanski (1931–1936)
- Boris Stefanov (1936–1938)
- Bela Breiner (1938–1940)
- Ștefan Foriș (1940–1944)
- Provisional secretariat: Emil Bodnăraș, Iosif Rangheț, and Constantin Pîrvulescu (April–September 1944)
- Gheorghe Gheorghiu-Dej (1944–1954)
- Gheorghe Apostol (1954–1955)
- Gheorghe Gheorghiu-Dej (1955–1965)
- Nicolae Ceaușescu (1965–1989)

=== Party congresses ===
Name/Period	Location
1st (May 1921)	Bucharest
2nd (October 1922)	Ploiești
3rd (August 1924)	Vienna
4th (July 1928)	Kharkiv
5th (December 1931)	Moscow
6th (February 1948)	Bucharest
7th (December 1955)	Bucharest
8th (June 1960)	Bucharest
9th (July 1965)	Bucharest
10th (August 1969)	Bucharest
11th (November 1974)	Bucharest
12th (November 1979)	Bucharest
13th (November 1984)	Bucharest
14th (November 1989)	Bucharest

== Electoral history ==
=== President of the State Council and Presidential elections ===
Election	Party candidate	Votes	%	Result
President elected by the Great National Assembly
1961	Gheorghe Gheorghiu-Dej	465	100%	Elected ✓
1965	Chivu Stoica	465	100%	Elected ✓
1967	Nicolae Ceaușescu	465	100%	Elected ✓
1974	Nicolae Ceaușescu	465	100%	Elected ✓
1980	Nicolae Ceaușescu	369	100%	Elected ✓
1985	Nicolae Ceaușescu	369	100%	Elected ✓

==== Note ====
In the 1961, 1965, 1967, the head of state was called "President of the State Council", while after 1973, the post changed to that of president.

=== Great National Assembly elections ===
Election	Party leader	Votes	%	Seats	+/–	Position
1926	Elek Köblös	39,203 as part of BMȚ	1.5%	0 / 387	Steady	6th
1927	Elek Köblös	31,505 as part of BMȚ	1.3%	0 / 387	Steady	6th
1928	Vitali Holostenco	38,851 as part of BMȚ	1.4%	0 / 387	Steady	6th
1931	Vitali Holostenco	73,716 as part of BMȚ	2.6%	5 / 387	▲5	▼10th
1932	Alexander Danieliuk-Stefanski	9,441 as part of BMȚ	0.3%	0 / 387	▼5	▼17th
1933	Alexander Danieliuk-Stefanski	3,515 as part of Labour League	0.1%	0 / 387	Steady	▲15th
1937	Boris Stefanov	Did not compete				
1939	Bela Breiner	Did not compete				
1946	Gheorghe Gheorghiu-Dej	as part of BPD		68 / 414	▲68	▲4th
1948	Gheorghe Gheorghiu-Dej	as part of FDP		190 / 405	▲122	▲1st
1952	Gheorghe Gheorghiu-Dej	as part of FDP		428 / 428	▲23	1st
1957	Gheorghe Gheorghiu-Dej	as part of FDP		437 / 437	▲9	1st
1961	Gheorghe Gheorghiu-Dej	as part of FDP		465 / 465	▲28	1st
1965	Gheorghe Gheorghiu-Dej	as part of FDP		465 / 465	Steady	1st
1969	Nicolae Ceaușescu	as part of FUS		465 / 465	Steady	1st
1975	Nicolae Ceaușescu	as part of FUS		349 / 349	▼116	1st
1980	Nicolae Ceaușescu	as part of FDUS		369 / 369	▲20	1st
1985	Nicolae Ceaușescu	as part of FDUS		369 / 369	Steady	1st

== See also ==
- List of Romanian communists
- Proclamation of Timişoara
- Eastern Bloc politics
- Social Democratic Party (Romania)
