= State Council of Romania =

1961–1989 collective head of state of Romania

The State Council (Romanian: Consiliul de Stat) was the highest executive body of Communist Romania from 1961 to 1989. It was the collective head of state before the creation of the office of President in 1974.

== Powers ==
=== 1961–1974 ===
The State Council was created in 1961 with an amendment to the 1952 Constitution, replacing the Presidium of the Great National Assembly as the permanent organ of the GNA. It consisted of a president, three vice presidents and thirteen members. By the end of the Communist era, it comprised a president, four vice presidents, a secretary and 15 members.

According to Article 63 of the 1965 Constitution, the State Council was "the supreme organ of state power (i. e., the GNA) in permanent session." It was elected by the GNA from among its members and held office for the GNA's duration—in practice, five years. As with all government bodies in Romania, it was nominally subordinate to the GNA. In practice, by 1989, all but two of its members were also members of the Central Committee of the Romanian Communist Party and also held important party posts.

The Constitution vested the State Council with two kinds of power. Article 63 detailed the powers that were permanently vested in the State Council, such as:

- Setting election dates
- Ratifying any treaty that didn't entail changing Romanian law (all treaties that amended laws could only be approved by the GNA)
- Organizing referendums
- Appointing and recalling the commander of the armed forces and the heads of state organs
- Granting citizenship, amnesty and asylum
- Representing the state in international relations
- Appointing diplomatic representatives
- Establishing military ranks
- Establishing decorations and honorary titles

Article 64 delegated some of the GNA's prerogatives to the State Council when that body was not in session, or in case of emergency. When the GNA was not in session, the State Council was empowered to set guidelines for the laws and supervise the local councils. It could also issue governmental regulations in lieu of law. If such regulation was not approved by the GNA at its next session, it was considered revoked. In exceptional circumstances, the State Council could also exercise control over the budget and economic plan, appoint and dismiss ministers and justices of the Supreme Court, mobilize the armed forces and declare war. In practice, the GNA's infrequent meetings (it only sat for twice a year) as well as the philosophy of democratic centralism meant that the State Council's decisions had the force of law.

Article 68 stated that all State Council decisions were to be made collectively. However, outside of Romania, the president of the State Council was reckoned as the country's head of state. Whenever the leader of the Communist Party was also State Council president (e.g., Gheorghe Gheorghiu-Dej from 1961 to 1965, and Nicolae Ceaușescu from 1967 to 1974), he derived his real power from his party post–an arrangement analogous to the current power structure in China, where the country's paramount leader serves as President, but derives his real power from his post as party leader.

=== 1974 amendments ===
The State Council's prerogatives were significantly reduced by constitutional amendments passed in 1974. Most notably, its presidency was upgraded to a full-fledged executive post, the President of the Republic. He continued to serve as ex officio president of the State Council, and was empowered to act on any matter that didn't require a plenary session of that body. He also assumed several powers that had previously been vested in the State Council as a whole, including conducting international relations and appointing and dismissing ministers and the heads of central agencies. When the GNA was not in session, the president could appoint and dismiss the president of the Supreme Court and the prosecutor general without State Council approval; indeed, under the 1974 amendments the president was not even required to consult his State Council colleagues when making such decisions. The State Council also lost the right to grant citizenship and asylum and to appoint the supreme commander of the armed forces. It also lost the right to grant amnesty when the GNA was in session.

In practice, after 1974 the State Council was largely emasculated by Ceaușescu, who served as both leader of the Communist Party and President of the Republic. By using his power to act on all issues that didn't require a formal plenum, he frequently ruled by decree. He also usurped many of the State Council's powers, including the power to grant citizenship and asylum. However, his control over the country was so absolute that no one dared object.

== List of presidents of the State Council ==
No.	Name	Portrait	Born–Died	Took office	Left office	Party
1	Gheorghe Gheorghiu-Dej		1901–1965	21 March 1961	19 March 1965	PMR
2	Chivu Stoica		1908–1975	24 March 1965	9 December 1967	PMR/PCR
3	Nicolae Ceaușescu		1918–1989	9 December 1967	22 December 1989 (ex officio from 28 March 1974)	PCR

== List of vice presidents of the State Council ==
(Romanian: Vicepreşedinte al Consiliului de Stat)

Name	Took office	Left office	Party	Name	Took office	Left office	Party	Name	Took office	Left office	Party	Name	Took office	Left office	Party	Name	Took office	Left office	Party
Ion Gheorghe Maurer	1961	1967	PCR	Ștefan Voitec	1961	1965	PCR	Maria Paretti	1961	1966	PCR	Avram Bunaciu	1961	1965	PCR	Vacant			
Ion Gheorghe Maurer	1961	1967	PCR	Constanța Crăciun	1965	1969	PCR	Maria Paretti	1961	1966	PCR	Vacant				Vacant			
Emil Bodnăraș	1967	1976	PCR	Manea Mănescu	1969	1972	PCR	Ștefan Peterfi	1967	1978	PCR	Vacant				Vacant			
Emil Bodnăraș	1967	1976	PCR	Miron Constantinescu	1972	1974	PCR	Ștefan Peterfi	1967	1978	PCR	Vacant				Vacant			
Emil Bodnăraș	1967	1976	PCR	Vasile Vâlcu	1974	1974	PCR	Ștefan Peterfi	1967	1978	PCR	Ștefan Voitec	1974	1984	PCR	Vacant			
Vacant				Emil Bobu	1975	1979	PCR	Ștefan Peterfi	1967	1978	PCR	Ștefan Voitec	1974	1984	PCR	Vacant			
Maria Ciocan	1980	1985	PCR	Petru Enache	1980	1987	PCR	Gheorghe Rădulescu	1979	1989	PCR	Ștefan Voitec	1974	1984	PCR	Ilie Verdeț	1982	1982	PCR
Vacant				Vacant				Gheorghe Rădulescu	1979	1989	PCR	Maria Ghițulică	1985	1989	PCR	Manea Mănescu	1983	1989	PCR
