= Embassy of Romania, Washington, D.C. =

Romanian Embassy, Washington, D.C.
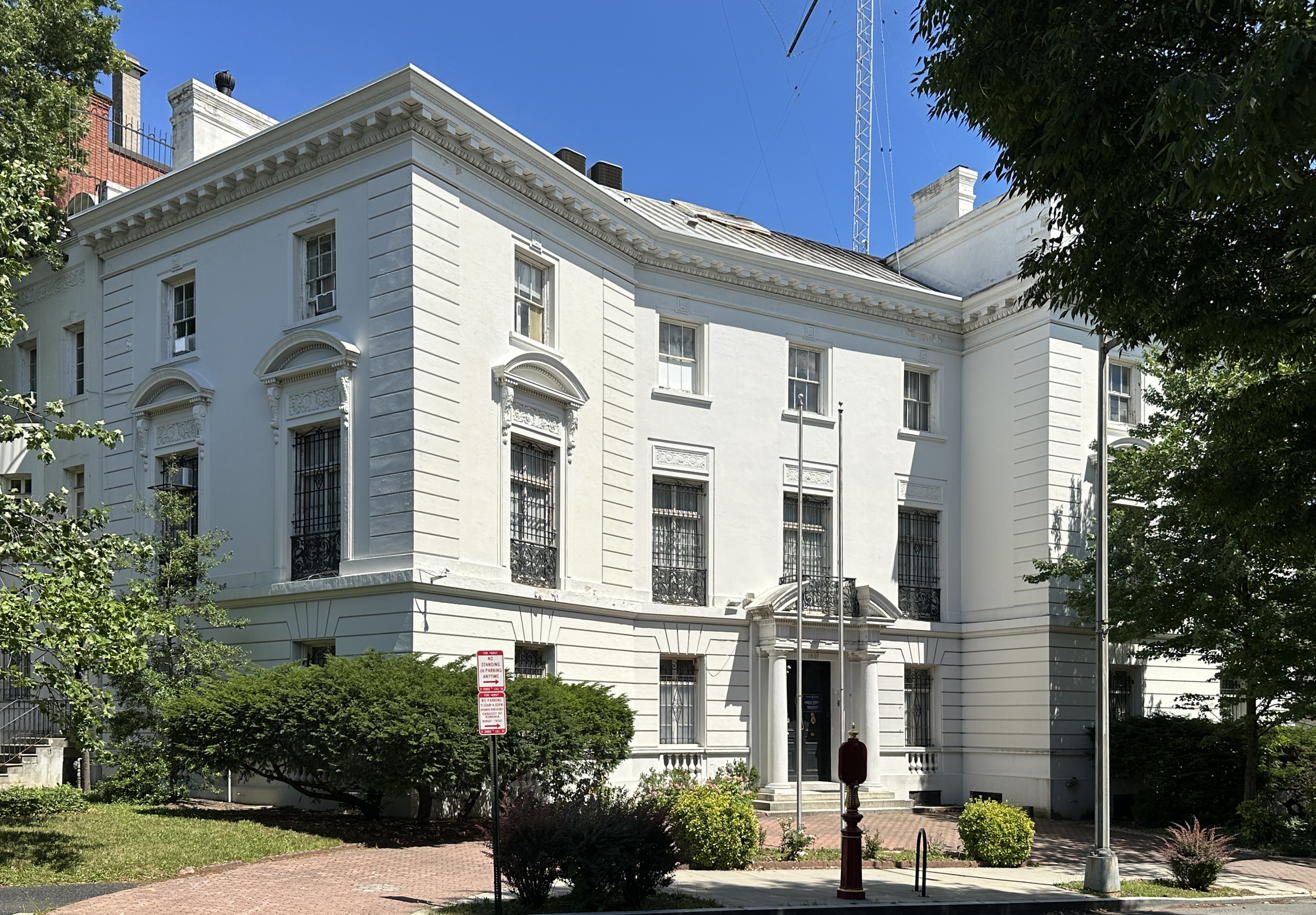
- Romanian Embassy in 2026
- Location: Washington, DC, United States
- Address: 1607 23rd Street, N.W.
- Coordinates: 38°54′41.6″N 77°3′1.5″W
- Ambassador: Andrei Muraru

The Romanian Embassy in Washington, D.C. is the main diplomatic mission of Romania to the United States of America. It is located at 1607 23rd Street, Northwest, Washington, D.C. 20008.

The Beaux-Arts mansion was built in 1907 by the prominent architecture firm Carrère and Hastings of New York. It was originally the home of Manhattan attorney Frank Ellis. In 1921 it became home of the Embassy of Romania. Carrère and Hastings’s design carefully combines a fine French style inspired by Parisian townhouses of the Louis XV and Louis XVI period with English elements of a later era. Among the more important works designed by the firm are the Manhattan Bridge in New York City (1905), the Carnegie Institute in Washington, D.C., the Cannon House Office Building in Washington, D.C. the Frick Residence in New York City, the Memorial Amphitheater at Arlington National Cemetery, and the Cosmos Club in Washington, D.C.

Crossing the threshold, visitors enter the foyer. The rather restrained architecture of this space – the use of stone and limited decoration – was highly influenced by Eighteenth Century French precedents, with some hints of Seventeenth Century English Palladian work. The straight and simple lines of the stonework are compensated by two flamboyant 18th-century Spanish chairs, and a marble table in the style of Italian palace furnishings.

Both reception rooms on the first floor, although very different, are influenced by French tradition. Two Ionic columns frame the door of the small meeting room on the left, which displays a Louis XV influence. White boiserie has Rococo shell-motif decorations, while over-door paintings depict rustic scenes in the manner of Fragonard.

The White Salon

The reception room to the right from the foyer harmoniously mixes different periods and styles: the rather architectural window-surrounds suggest the work of Jacques-Ange Gabriel at the Petit Trianon in Versailles; the mammoth stone fireplace mantel has the look of a Victorian English piece, while the simple wallpaper pattern of vertical stripes alternating with floral strings suggests designs from the early decades of the Nineteenth Century in Russia. Prominently visible in this room is one of the several distinctive chandeliers found in the embassy.

The Ambassador’s study

Visitors may be surprised by the unusual shape of the 18th Century French style ironwork of the grand stair, which leads to the second floor foyer – used as a waiting room and a reception area – to the Ambassador’s study and to the ballroom. With its dark stained paneling and pilasters flanking the fireplace, the study suggests an English library. Yet French influences can be found in the fireplace mantel and carved over door panels with Louis XV decorative motifs. The furnishings of this room, with turned legs, bold carvings and leather seats have a distinctive Romanian feel.

On the opposite side of the waiting room, the ballroom displays elements of late Louis XV and early Louis XVI style. A handsome crystal Art Nouveau chandelier is reflected by symmetrical mirrors placed on three of the walls. Other focal points of the room are a magnificent Louis-Philippe commode, as well as a white marble fireplace and sculptures by Marcel Guguianu.

The first occupant of the house was former Navy officer Robert Means Thompson, an ardent supporter of the Navy League of the United States, who served several years as its president. When he left the house in 1921, Frank Ellis sold it to the Romanian Government, represented by the Minister of the Legation, Prince Antoine Bibesco.

== See also ==
- List of diplomatic missions of Romania
- List of ambassadors of Romania to the United States
