= List of diplomatic missions of Romania =

Romania has an extensive and a large diplomatic network.

This listing excludes honorary consulates, trade missions, and cultural institutes.

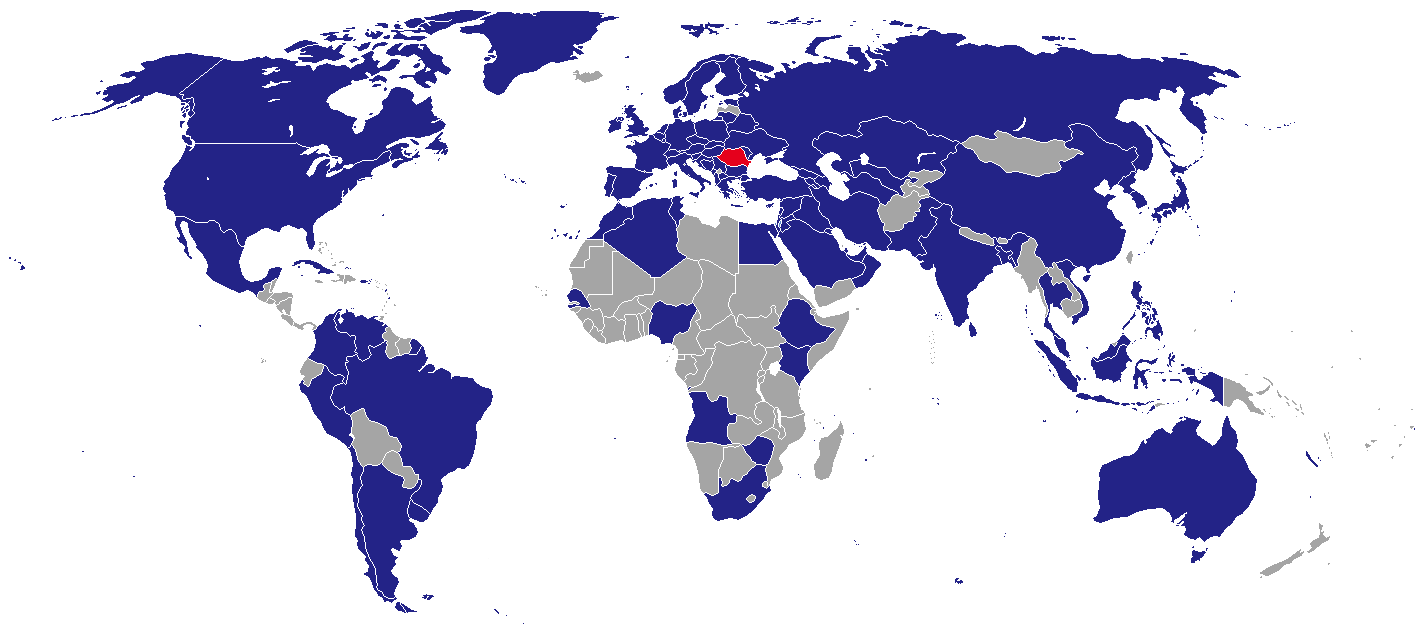
Diplomatic missions of Romania

== Current missions ==
=== Africa ===
Host country	Host city	Mission	Concurrent accreditation	Ref.
Algeria	Algiers	Embassy	Countries: Chad; Niger	
Angola	Luanda	Embassy	Countries: Congo-Brazzaville; Congo-Kinshasa; São Tomé and Príncipe	
Egypt	Cairo	Embassy	Countries: Eritrea; Djibouti	
Ethiopia	Addis Ababa	Embassy	Countries: Central African Republic; Somalia; Sudan; South Sudan; International Organizations: African Union	
Kenya	Nairobi	Embassy	Countries: Burundi; Rwanda; Tanzania; Uganda; International Organizations: United Nations; United Nations Environment Programme; United Nations Human Settlements Programme	
Morocco	Rabat	Embassy	Countries: Mauritania	
Nigeria	Abuja	Embassy	Countries: Benin; Cameroon; Equatorial Guinea; Gabon; Ghana; Liberia; Sierra Leone; Togo	
Senegal	Dakar	Embassy	Countries: Burkina Faso; Cape Verde; Gambia; Guinea; Guinea-Bissau; Ivory Coast; Mali	
South Africa	Pretoria	Embassy	Countries: Botswana; Comoros; Eswatini; Lesotho; Madagascar; Mauritius; Mozambique; Namibia; Seychelles; Zambia	
South Africa	Cape Town	Consulate-General	Countries: Botswana; Comoros; Eswatini; Lesotho; Madagascar; Mauritius; Mozambique; Namibia; Seychelles; Zambia	
Tunisia	Tunis	Embassy	Countries: Libya	
Zimbabwe	Harare	Embassy	Countries: Malawi	

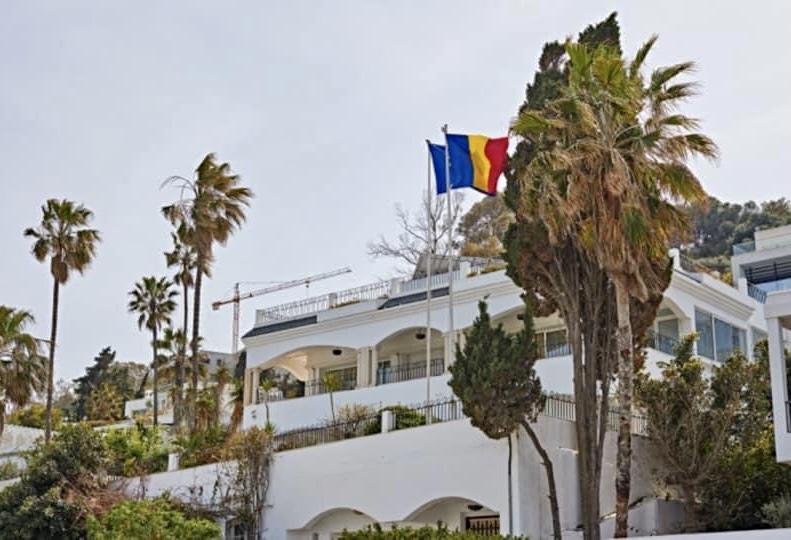
Embassy in Tunis

=== Americas ===
Host country	Host city	Mission	Concurrent accreditation	Ref.
Argentina	Buenos Aires	Embassy	Countries: Paraguay	
Brazil	Brasília	Embassy	Countries: Guyana; Suriname	
Brazil	Rio de Janeiro	Consulate-General	Countries: Guyana; Suriname	
Canada	Ottawa	Embassy		
Canada	Montreal	Consulate-General		
Canada	Toronto	Consulate-General		
Canada	Vancouver	Consulate-General		
Colombia	Bogotá	Embassy	Countries: Dominican Republic; Panama	
Chile	Santiago de Chile	Embassy		
Cuba	Havana	Embassy	Countries: Antigua and Barbuda; Bahamas; Barbados; Grenada; Haiti; Jamaica; Saint Kitts and Nevis; Saint Lucia; Saint Vincent and the Grenadines; Trinidad and Tobago	
Mexico	Mexico City	Embassy	Countries: Belize; Costa Rica; El Salvador; Guatemala; Nicaragua	
Peru	Lima	Embassy	Countries: Bolivia; Ecuador	
United States	Washington, D.C.	Embassy	International Organizations: Organization of American States (Note: Accredited as an observer mission.)	
United States	Chicago	Consulate-General	International Organizations: Organization of American States	
United States	Los Angeles	Consulate-General	International Organizations: Organization of American States	
United States	Miami	Consulate-General	International Organizations: Organization of American States	
United States	New York City	Consulate-General	International Organizations: Organization of American States	
Uruguay	Montevideo	Embassy		
Venezuela	Caracas	Embassy		

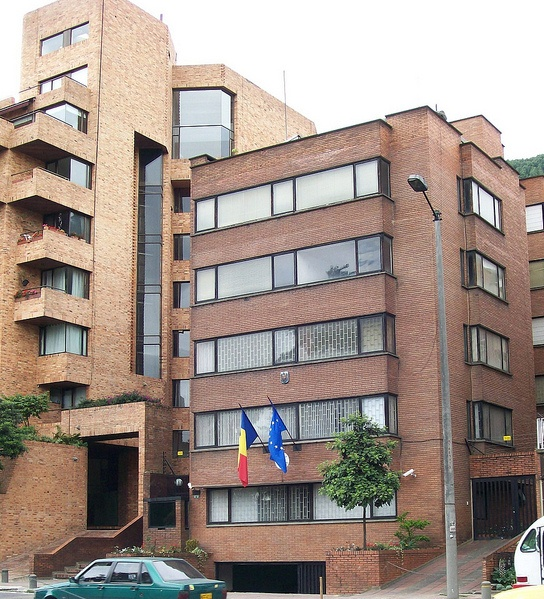
Embassy in Bogotá

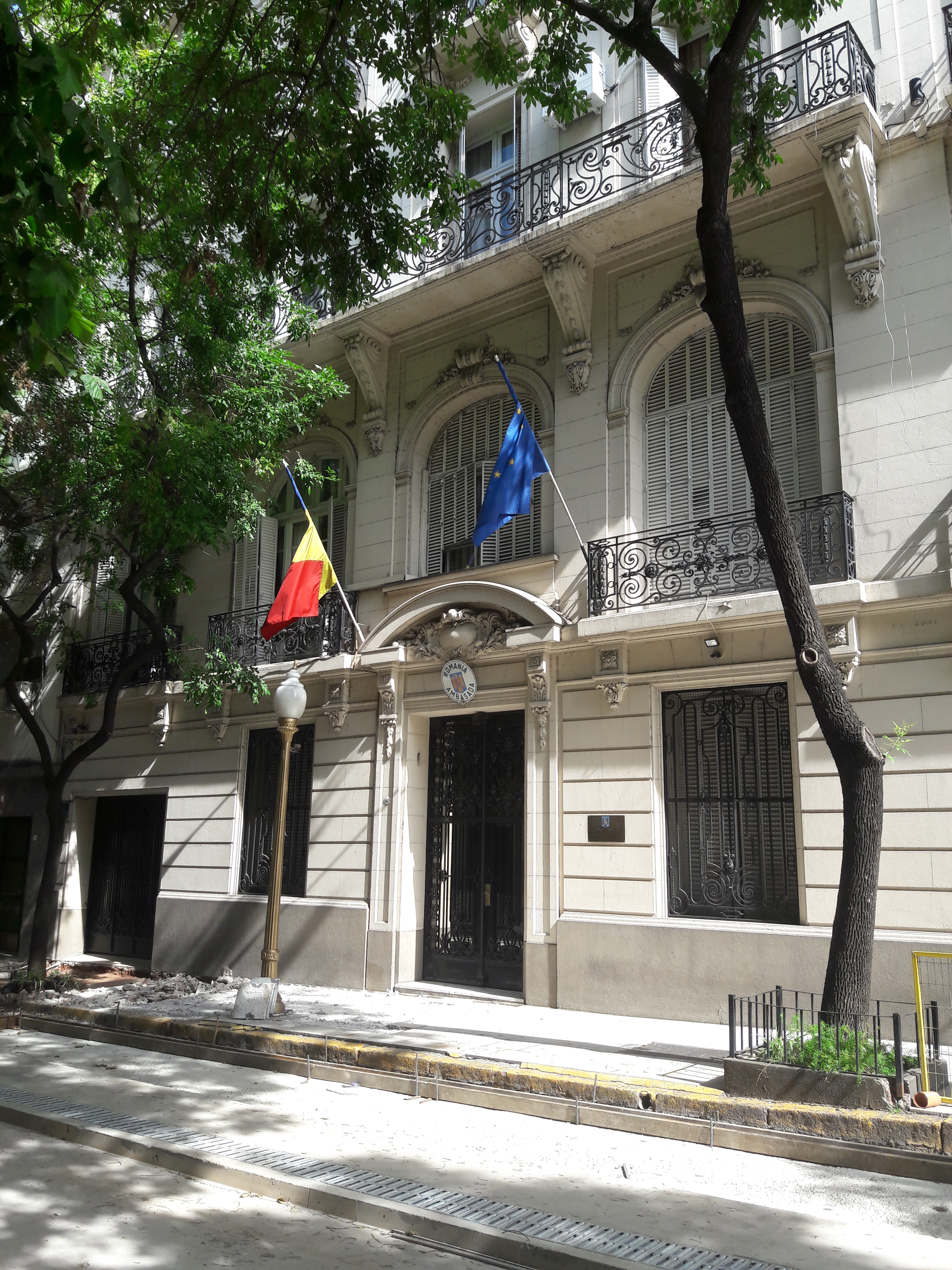
Embassy in Buenos Aires

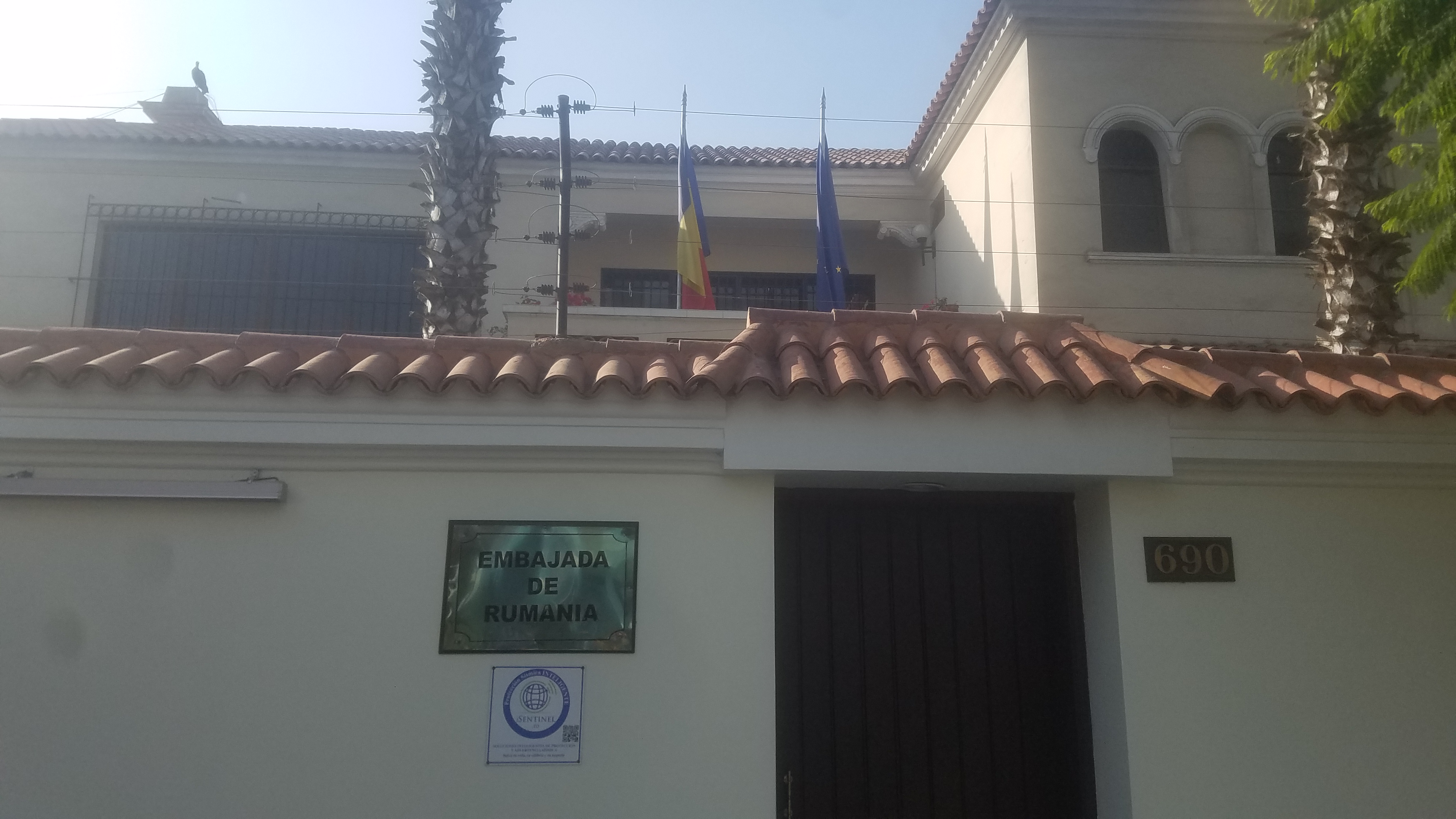
Embassy in Lima

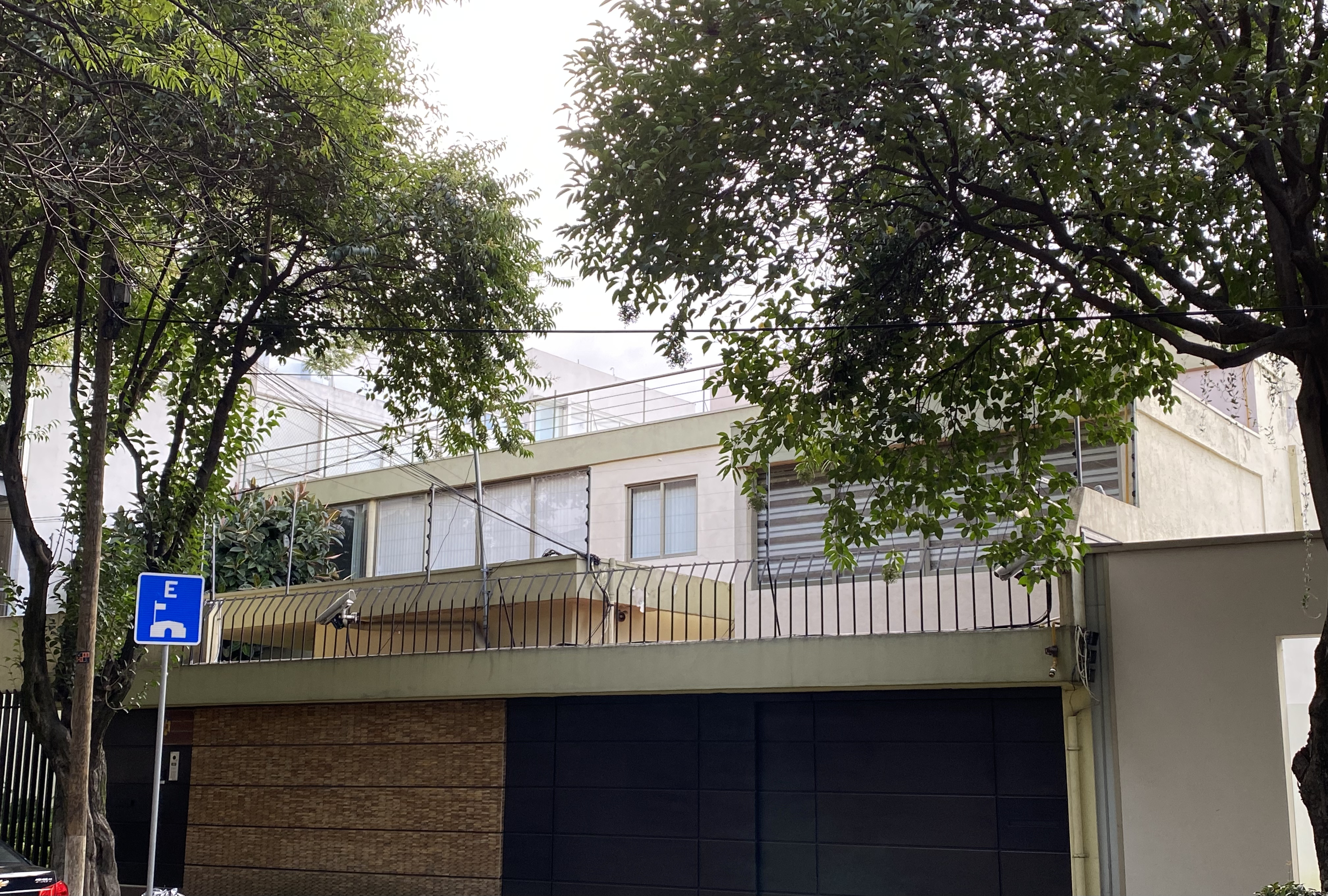
Embassy in Mexico City

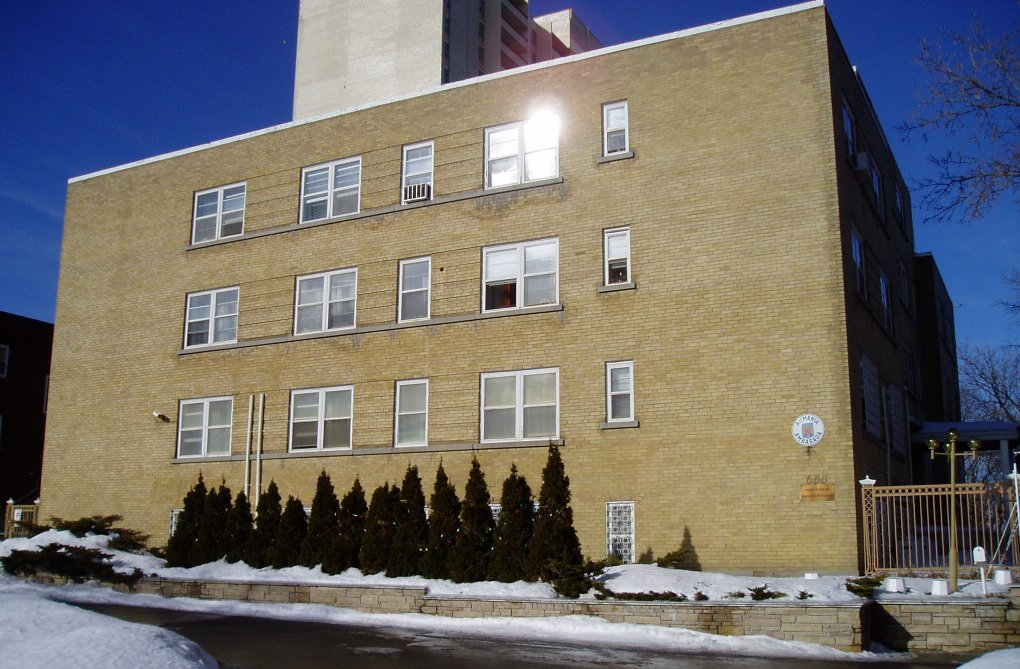
Embassy in Ottawa

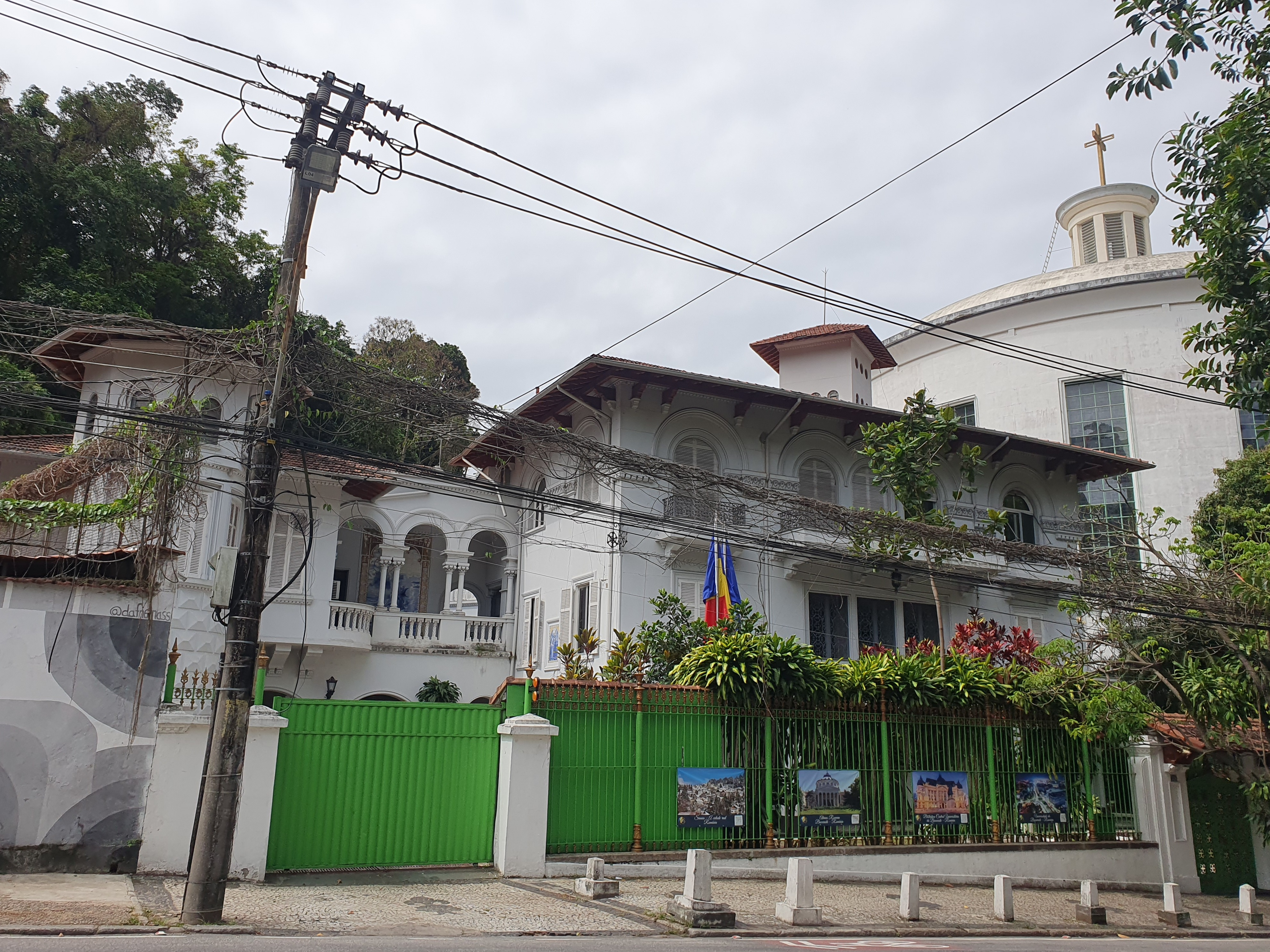
Consulate-General in Rio de Janeiro

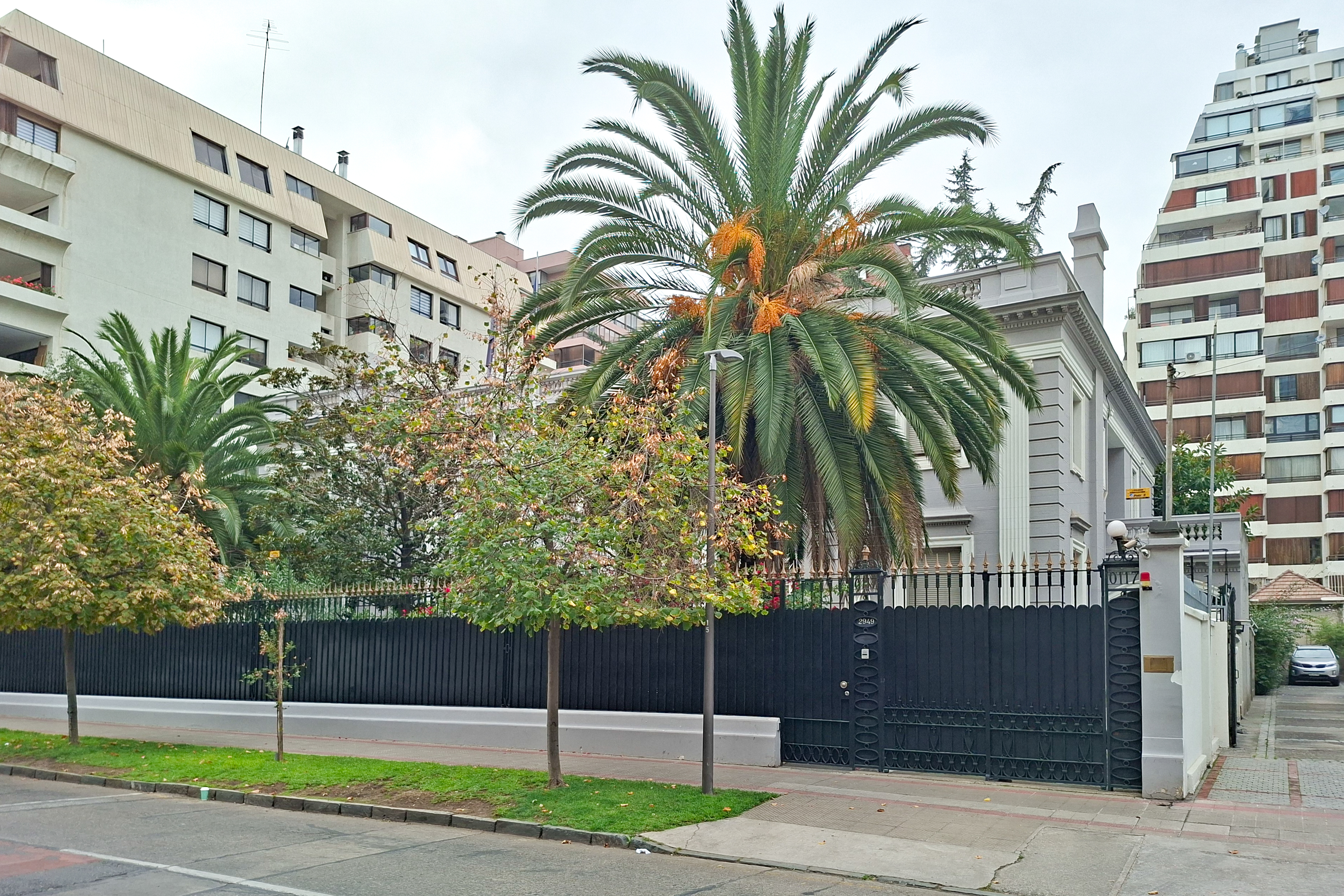
Embassy in Santiago

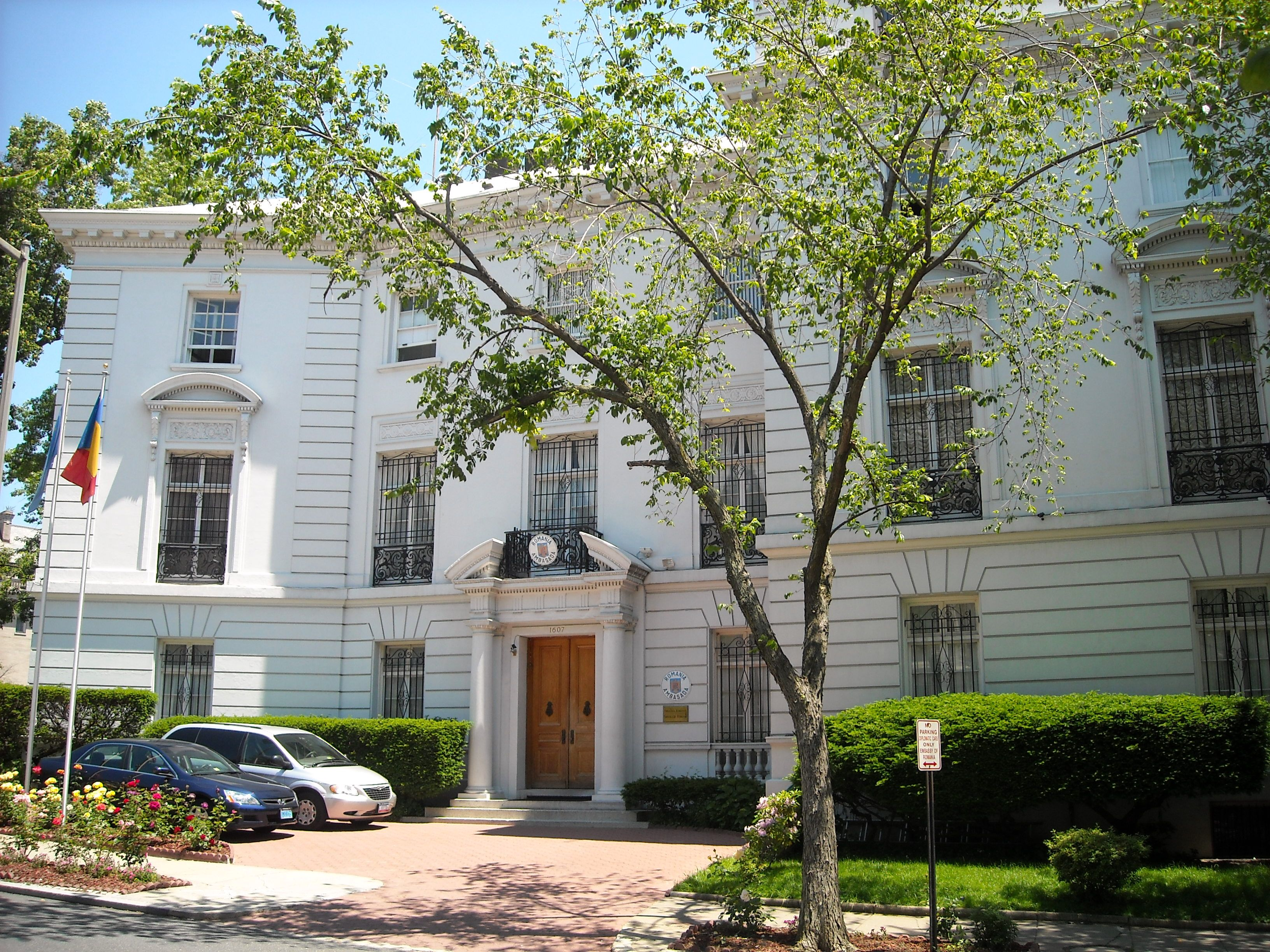
Embassy in Washington, D.C.

=== Asia ===
Host country	Host city	Mission	Concurrent accreditation	Ref.
Armenia	Yerevan	Embassy		
Azerbaijan	Baku	Embassy		
China	Beijing	Embassy	Countries: Mongolia; Myanmar	
China	Hong Kong	Consulate-General	Countries: Mongolia; Myanmar	
China	Shanghai	Consulate-General	Countries: Mongolia; Myanmar	
Georgia	Tbilisi	Embassy		
India	New Delhi	Embassy	Countries: Bangladesh; Nepal; Consular jurisdiction only: Bhutan (Note: Bhutan is listed only under the consular jurisdiction of the Romanian Embassy in New Delhi. As of 2024, the two countries have yet to establish formal diplomatic relations.)	
Indonesia	Jakarta	Embassy	Countries: Timor-Leste; International Organizations: Association of Southeast Asian Nations	
Iran	Tehran	Embassy		
Iraq	Baghdad	Embassy		
Iraq	Erbil	Consular office		
Israel	Tel Aviv	Embassy		
Israel	Haifa	Consulate-General		
Japan	Tokyo	Embassy		
Jordan	Amman	Embassy		
Kazakhstan	Astana	Embassy	Countries: Kyrgyzstan; Tajikistan	
Kuwait	Kuwait City	Embassy		
Lebanon	Beirut	Embassy		
Malaysia	Kuala Lumpur	Embassy	Countries: Brunei	
Oman	Muscat	Embassy		
Palestine	Ramallah	Representative office		
Pakistan	Islamabad	Embassy	Countries: Afghanistan	
Philippines	Manila	Embassy	Countries: Marshall Islands; Micronesia; Palau	
Qatar	Doha	Embassy		
Saudi Arabia	Riyadh	Embassy		
Singapore	Singapore	Embassy	Countries: Papua New Guinea	
South Korea	Seoul	Embassy		
Sri Lanka	Colombo	Embassy	Countries: Maldives	
Syria	Damascus	Embassy		
Thailand	Bangkok	Embassy	Countries: Laos	
Turkey	Ankara	Embassy		
Turkey	Istanbul	Consulate-General		
Turkey	İzmir	Consulate-General		
Turkmenistan	Ashgabat	Embassy		
United Arab Emirates	Abu Dhabi	Embassy	Countries: Bahrain; Yemen	
United Arab Emirates	Dubai	Consulate-General	Countries: Bahrain; Yemen	
Uzbekistan	Tashkent	Embassy		
Vietnam	Hanoi	Embassy	Countries: Cambodia	

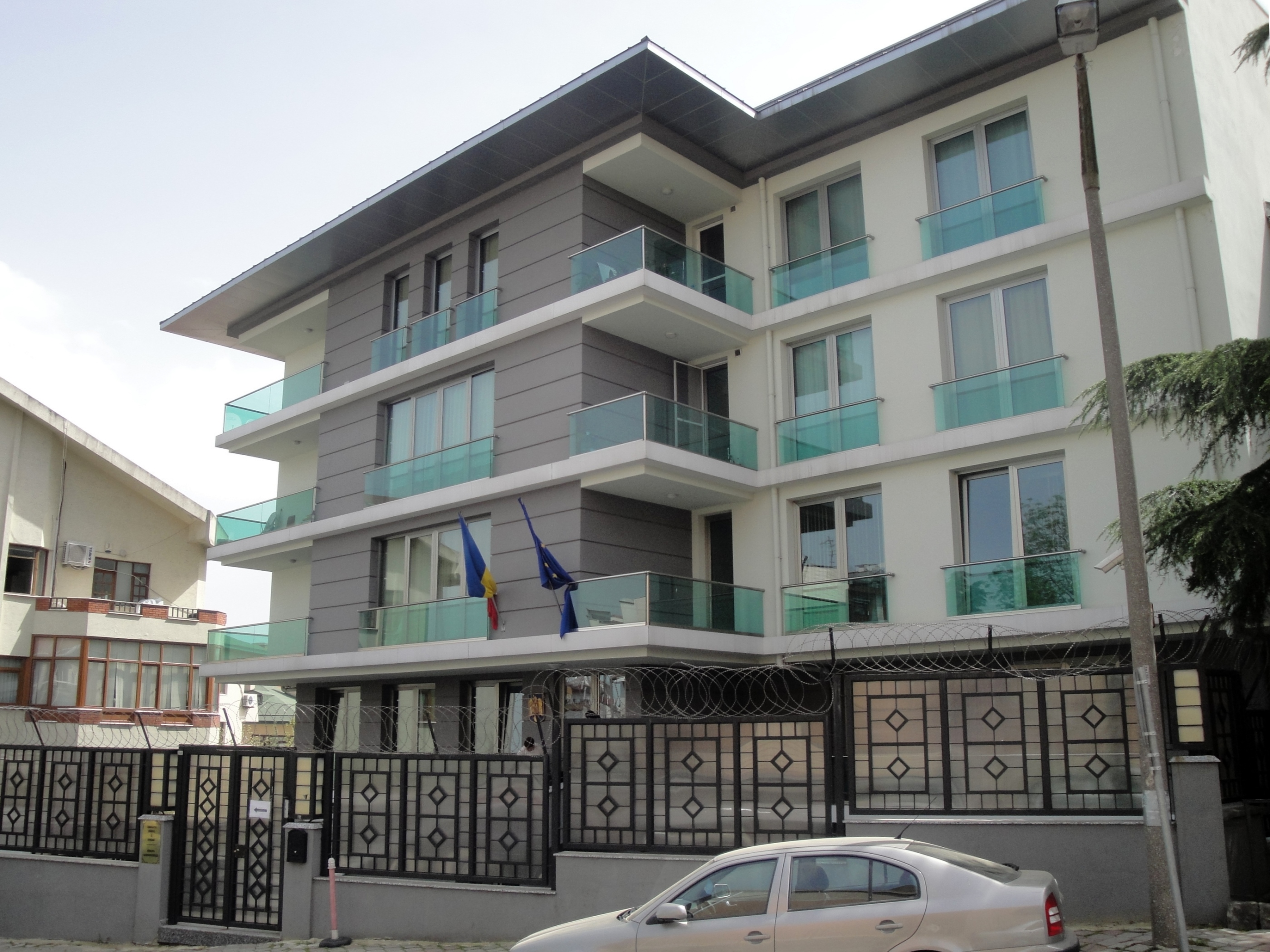
Consulate-General in Istanbul

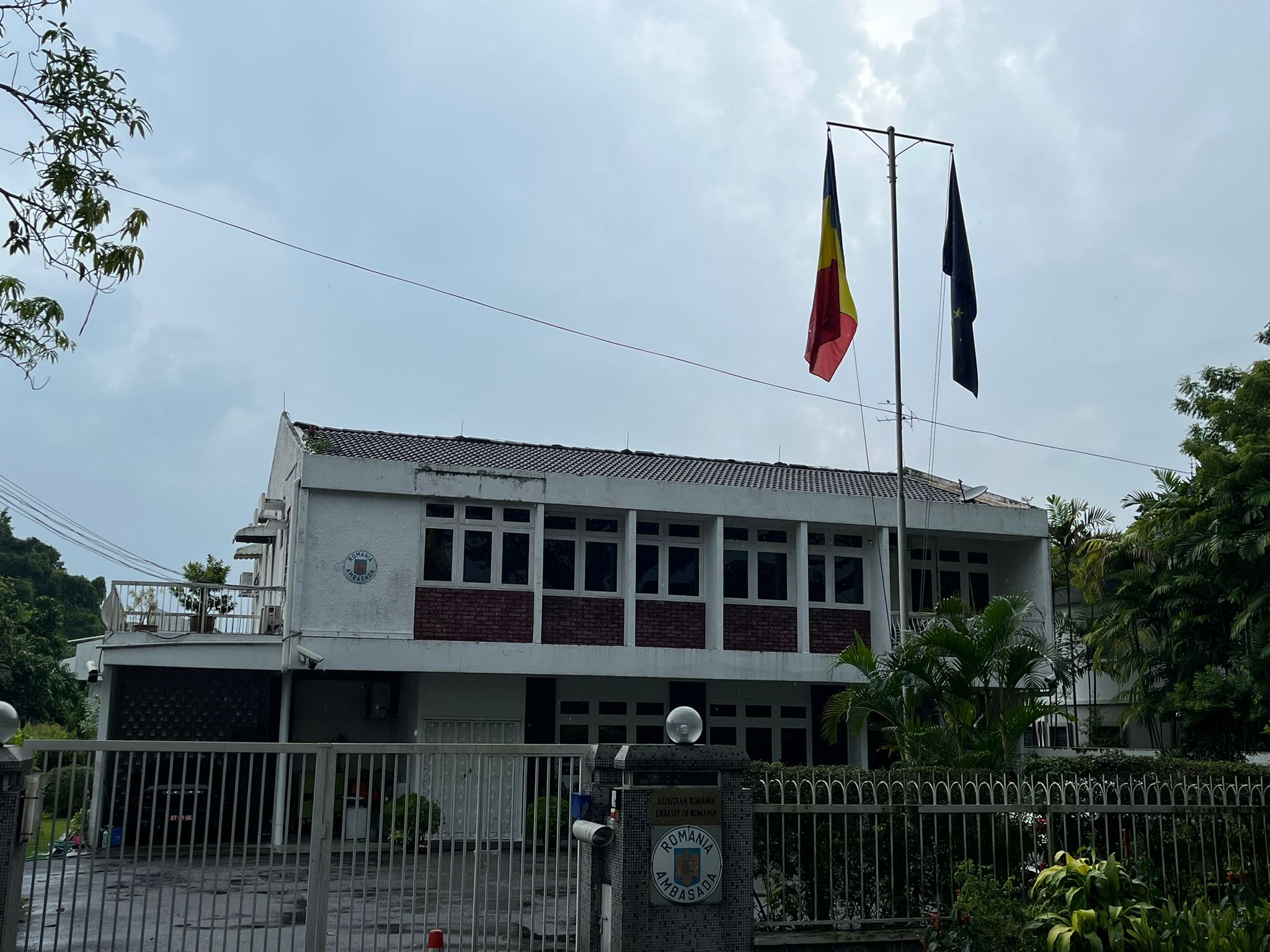
Embassy in Kuala Lumpur

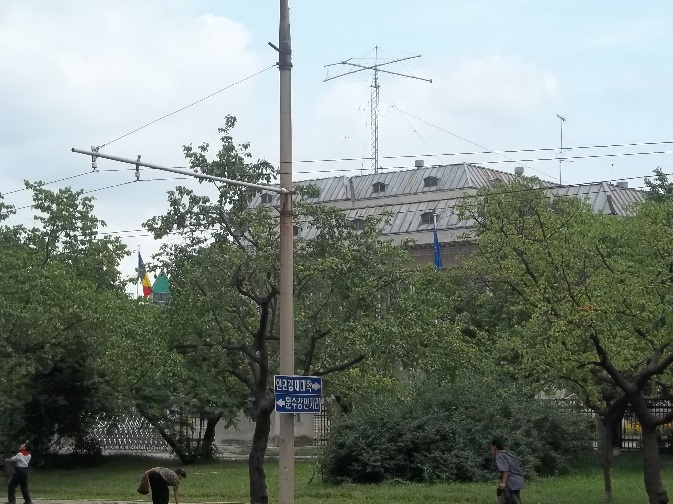
Embassy in Pyongyang

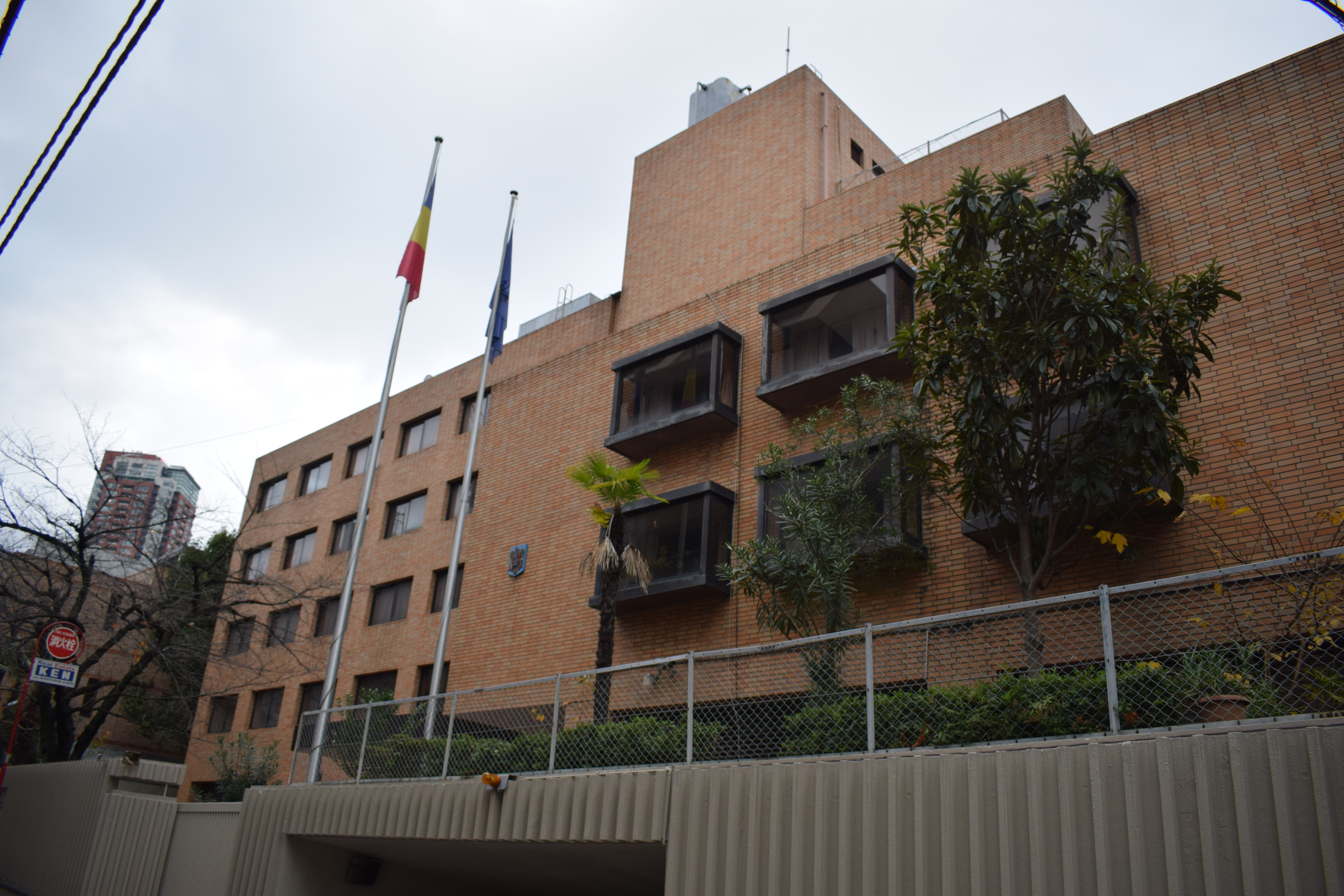
Embassy in Tokyo

=== Europe ===
Host country	Host city	Mission	Concurrent accreditation	Ref.
Albania	Tirana	Embassy		
Austria	Vienna	Embassy		
Austria	Salzburg	Consulate-General		
Belarus	Minsk	Embassy		
Belgium	Brussels	Embassy		
Bosnia and Herzegovina	Sarajevo	Embassy		
Bulgaria	Sofia	Embassy		
Croatia	Zagreb	Embassy		
Cyprus	Nicosia	Embassy		
Czechia	Prague	Embassy		
Denmark	Copenhagen	Embassy	Countries: Iceland	
Estonia	Tallinn	Embassy		
Finland	Helsinki	Embassy		
France	Paris	Embassy	Countries: Andorra; Monaco	
France	Lyon	Consulate-General	Countries: Andorra; Monaco	
France	Marseille	Consulate-General	Countries: Andorra; Monaco	
France	Strasbourg	Consulate-General	Countries: Andorra; Monaco	
Germany	Berlin	Embassy		
Germany	Bonn	Consulate-General		
Germany	Munich	Consulate-General		
Germany	Stuttgart	Consulate-General		
Greece	Athens	Embassy		
Greece	Thessaloniki	Consulate-General		
Holy See (Note: The Romanian Embassy to the Holy See is located outside Vatican territory in Rome.)	Rome	Embassy	Sovereign Entity: Sovereign Military Order of Malta	
Hungary	Budapest	Embassy		
Hungary	Gyula	Consulate-General		
Hungary	Szeged	Consulate-General		
Ireland	Dublin	Embassy		
Italy	Rome	Embassy	Countries: Malta; San Marino; International Organizations: Food and Agriculture Organization; International Fund for Agricultural Development; World Food Programme	
Italy	Bari	Consulate-General	Countries: Malta; San Marino; International Organizations: Food and Agriculture Organization; International Fund for Agricultural Development; World Food Programme	
Italy	Bologna	Consulate-General	Countries: Malta; San Marino; International Organizations: Food and Agriculture Organization; International Fund for Agricultural Development; World Food Programme	
Italy	Milan	Consulate-General	Countries: Malta; San Marino; International Organizations: Food and Agriculture Organization; International Fund for Agricultural Development; World Food Programme	
Italy	Trieste	Consulate-General	Countries: Malta; San Marino; International Organizations: Food and Agriculture Organization; International Fund for Agricultural Development; World Food Programme	
Italy	Turin	Consulate-General	Countries: Malta; San Marino; International Organizations: Food and Agriculture Organization; International Fund for Agricultural Development; World Food Programme	
Italy	Catania	Consulate	Countries: Malta; San Marino; International Organizations: Food and Agriculture Organization; International Fund for Agricultural Development; World Food Programme	
Kosovo (Note: Romania does not recognize Kosovo's declaration of independence, and therefore does not maintain formal diplomatic relations with it. Nonetheless, Romania has a liaison office in Pristina, which functions as a de facto embassy.)	Pristina	Liaison office		
Lithuania	Vilnius	Embassy	Countries: Latvia	
Luxembourg	Luxembourg City	Embassy		
Moldova	Chișinău	Embassy		
Moldova	Bălți	Consulate-General		
Moldova	Cahul	Consulate-General		
Moldova	Ungheni	Consular office		
Montenegro	Podgorica	Embassy		
North Macedonia	Skopje	Embassy		
Netherlands	The Hague	Embassy	International Organizations: OPCW	
Norway	Oslo	Embassy		
Poland	Warsaw	Embassy		
Portugal	Lisbon	Embassy		
Russia	Moscow	Embassy		
Russia	Saint Petersburg	Consulate-General		
Serbia	Belgrade	Embassy		
Serbia	Vršac	Consulate-General		
Serbia	Zaječar	Consulate-General		
Slovakia	Bratislava	Embassy		
Slovenia	Ljubljana	Embassy		
Spain	Madrid	Embassy	International Organizations: World Tourism Organization	
Spain	Barcelona	Consulate-General	International Organizations: World Tourism Organization	
Spain	Bilbao	Consulate-General	International Organizations: World Tourism Organization	
Spain	Seville	Consulate-General	International Organizations: World Tourism Organization	
Spain	Valencia	Consulate-General	International Organizations: World Tourism Organization	
Spain	Almería	Consulate	International Organizations: World Tourism Organization	
Spain	Castellón de la Plana	Consulate	International Organizations: World Tourism Organization	
Spain	Ciudad Real	Consulate	International Organizations: World Tourism Organization	
Spain	Zaragoza	Consulate	International Organizations: World Tourism Organization	
Sweden	Stockholm	Embassy		
Switzerland	Bern	Embassy	Countries: Liechtenstein	
Ukraine	Kyiv	Embassy		
Ukraine	Chernivtsi	Consulate-General		
Ukraine	Odesa	Consulate-General		
Ukraine	Solotvyno	Consulate		
United Kingdom	London	Embassy		
United Kingdom	Birmingham	Consulate-General		
United Kingdom	Edinburgh	Consulate-General		
United Kingdom	Manchester	Consulate-General		

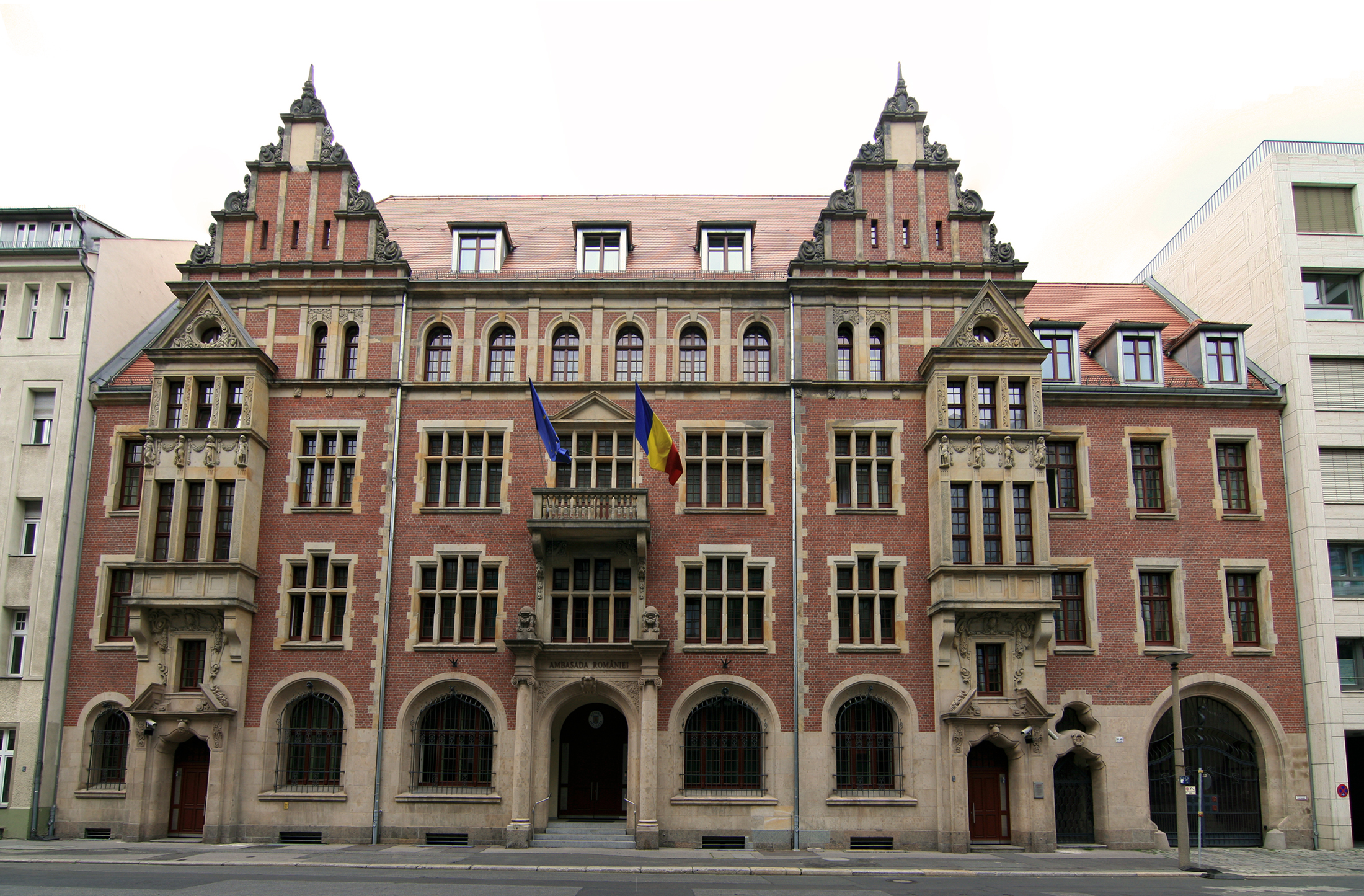
Embassy in Berlin

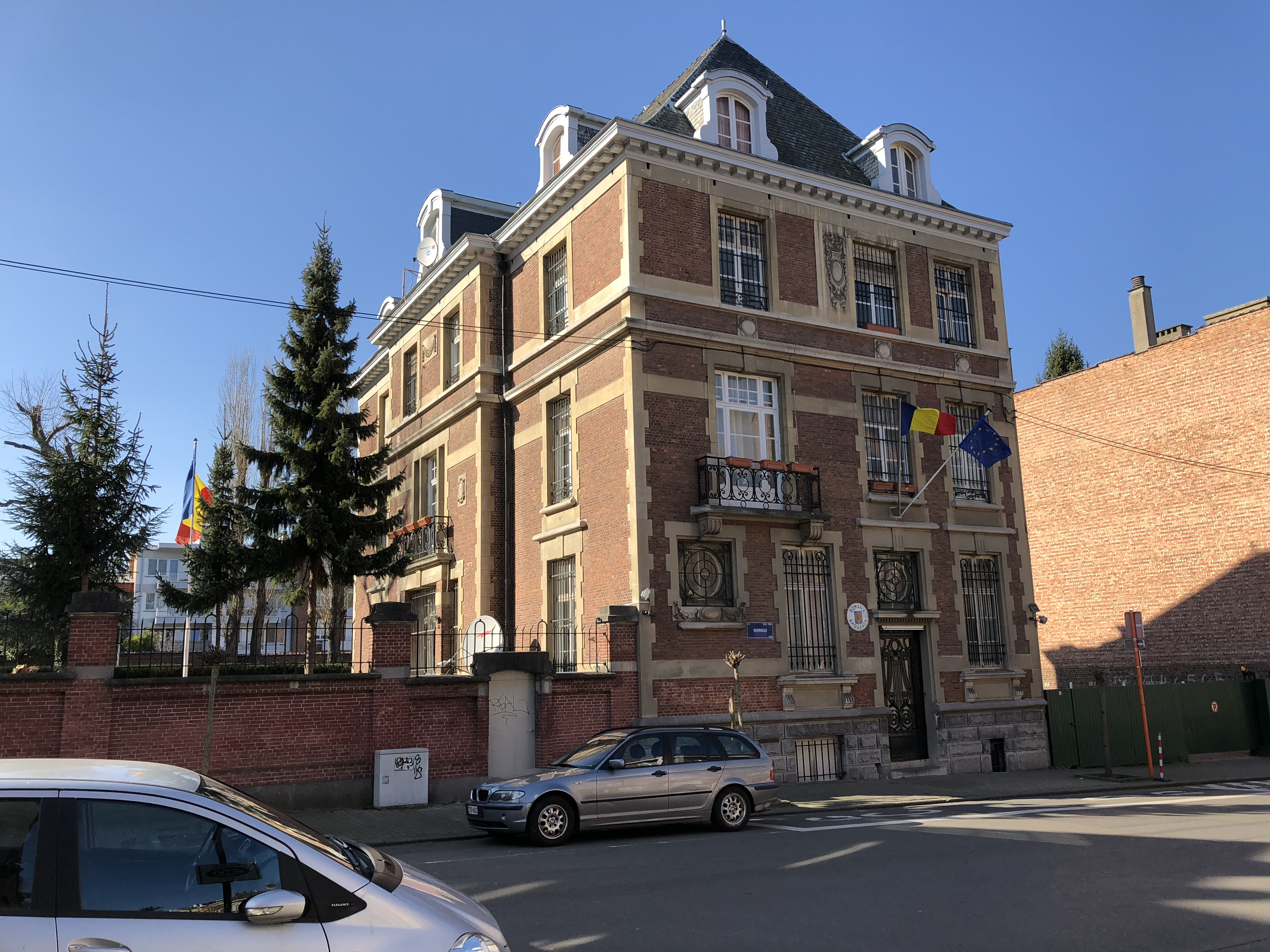
Embassy in Brussels

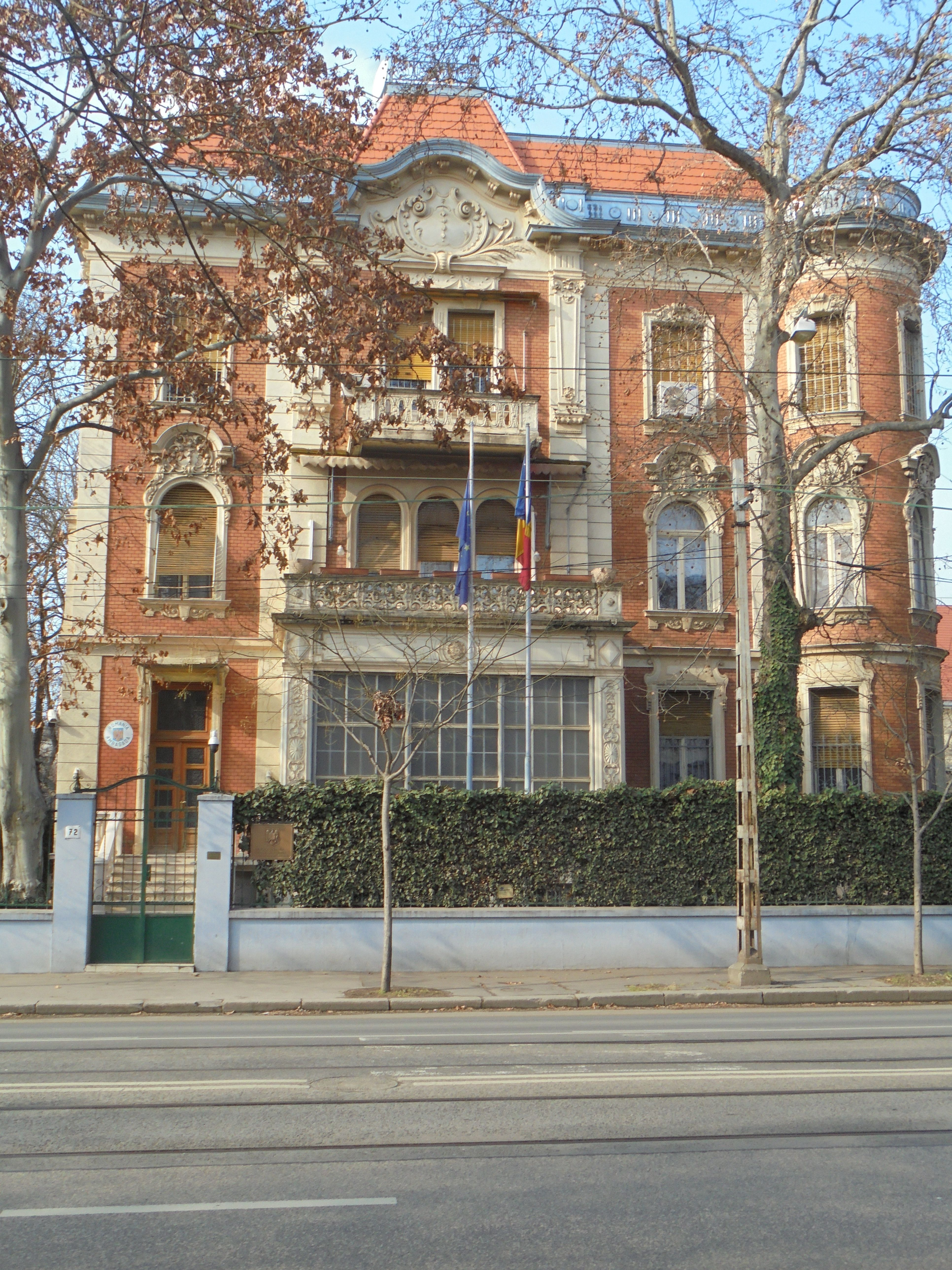
Embassy in Budapest

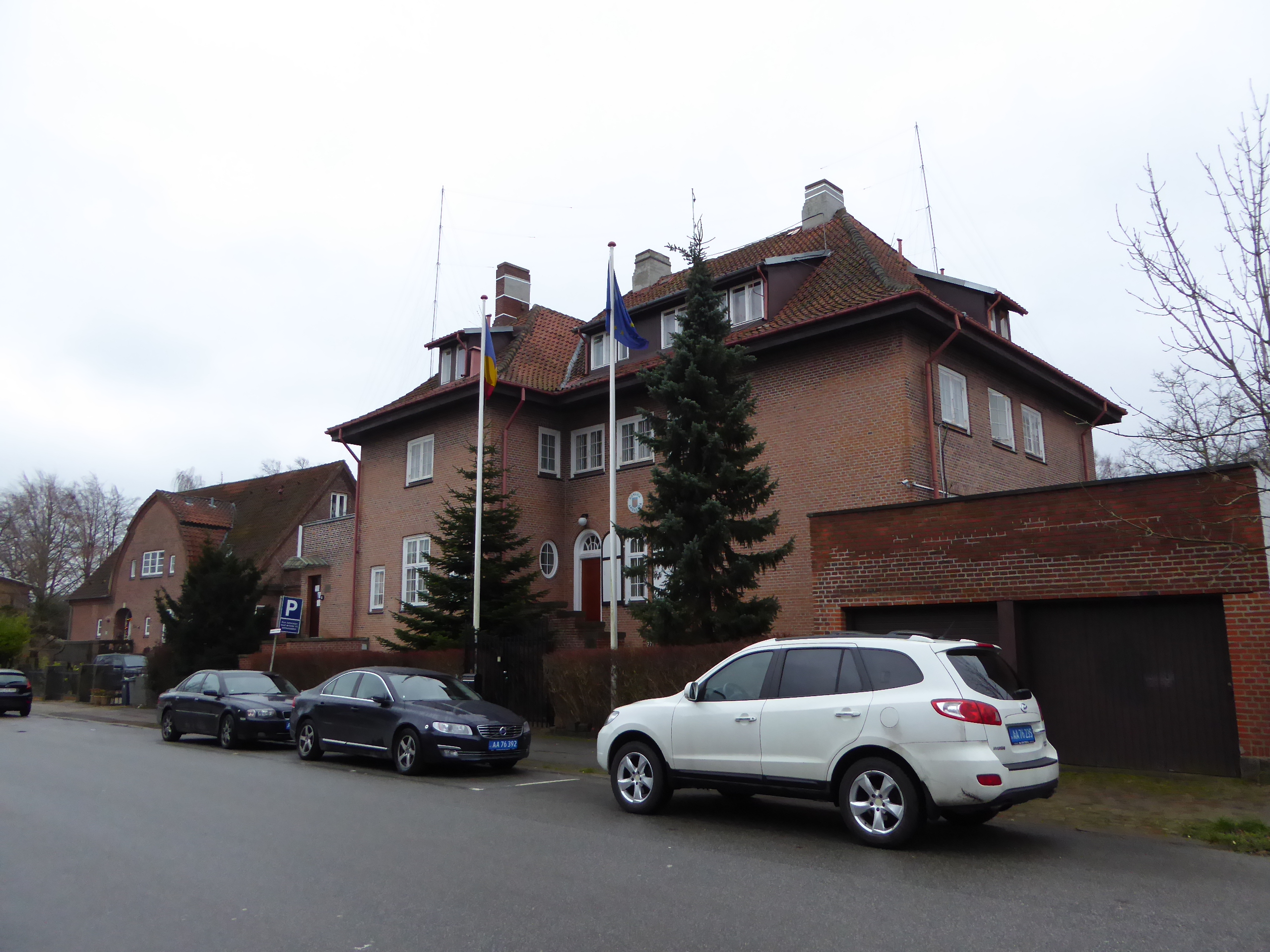
Embassy in Copenhagen

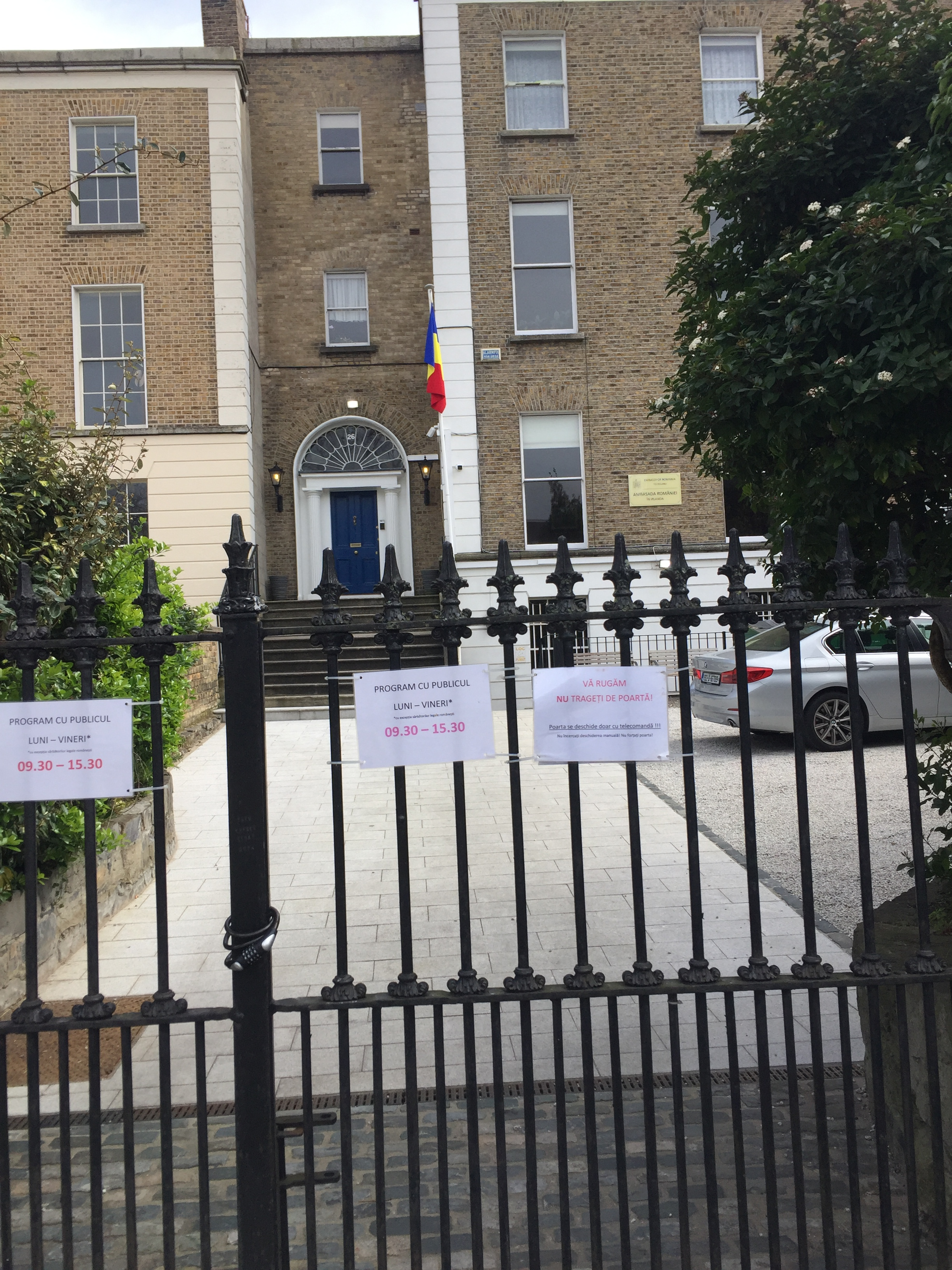
Embassy in Dublin

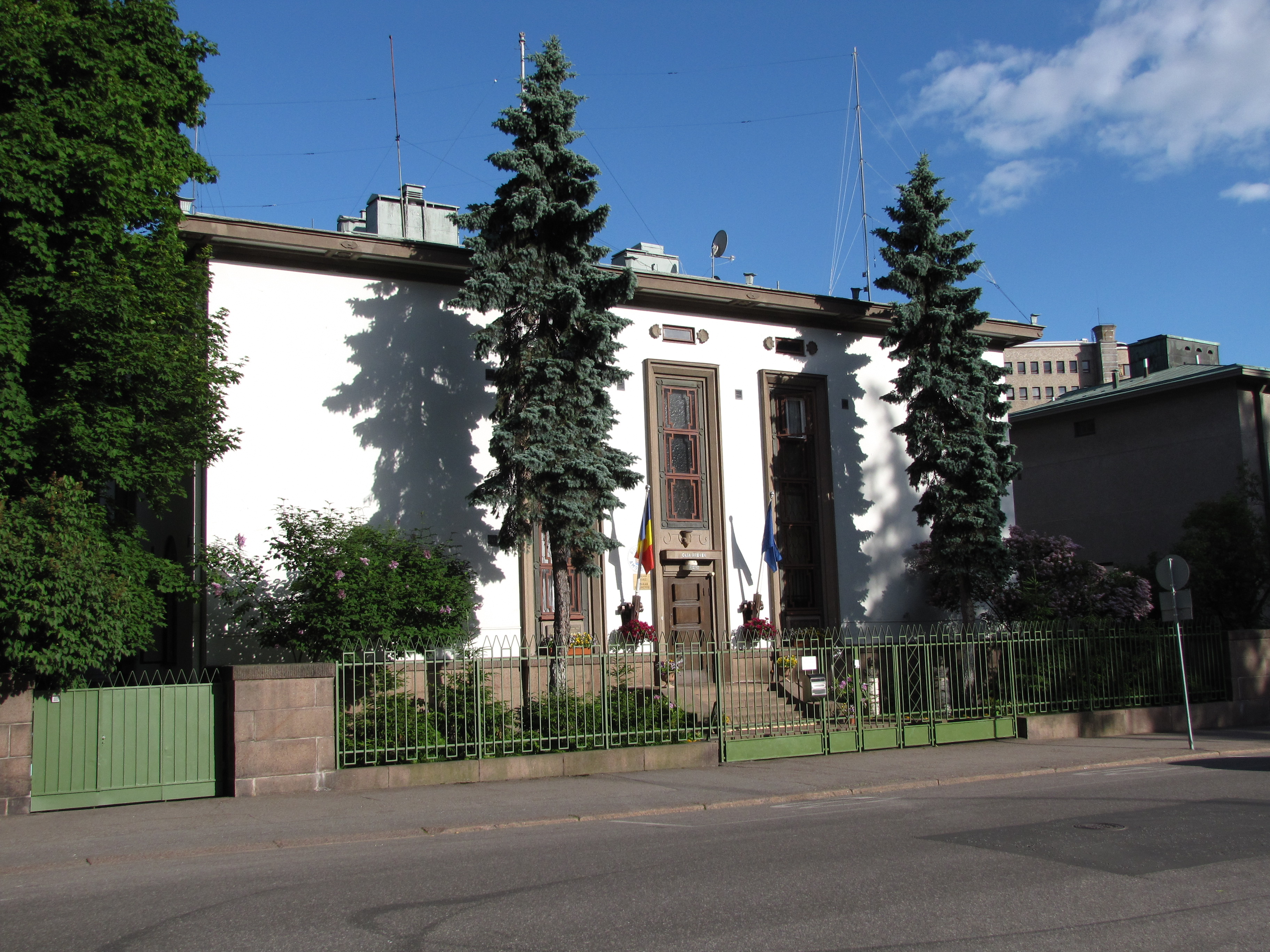
Embassy in Helsinki

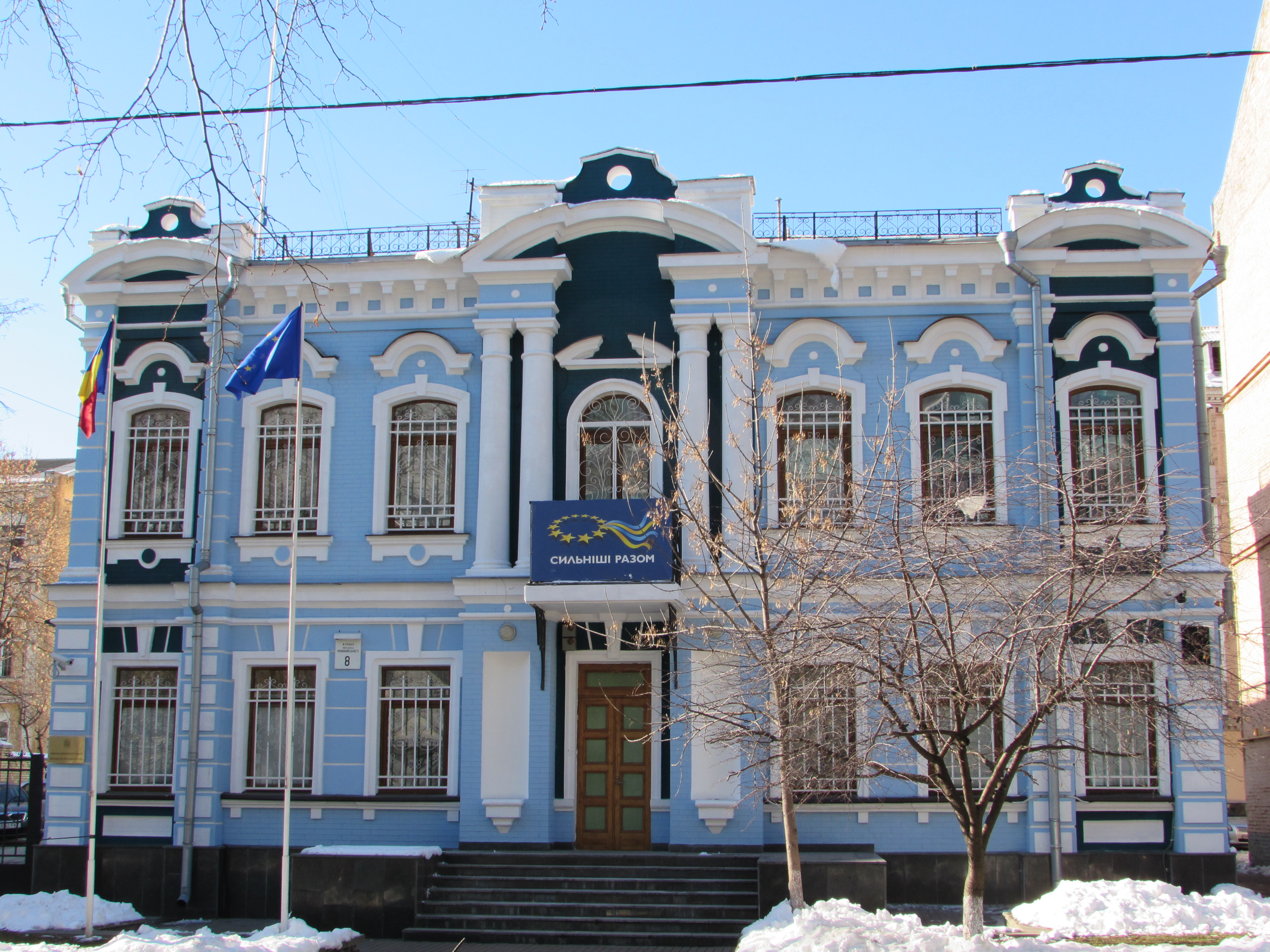
Embassy in Kyiv

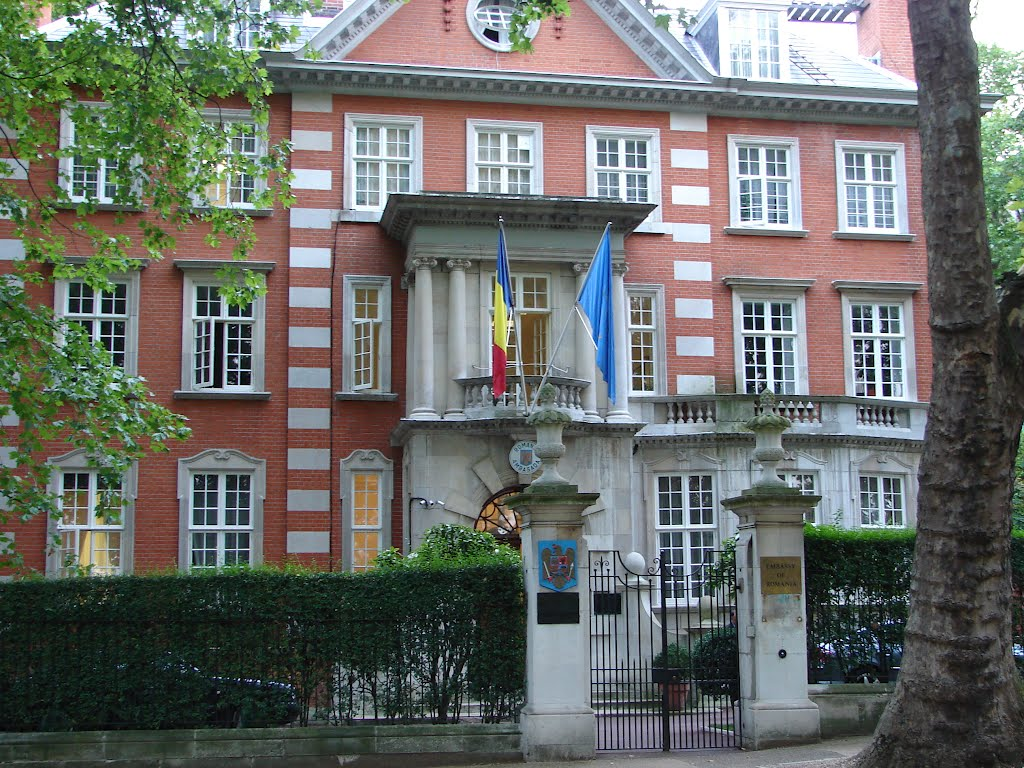
Embassy in London

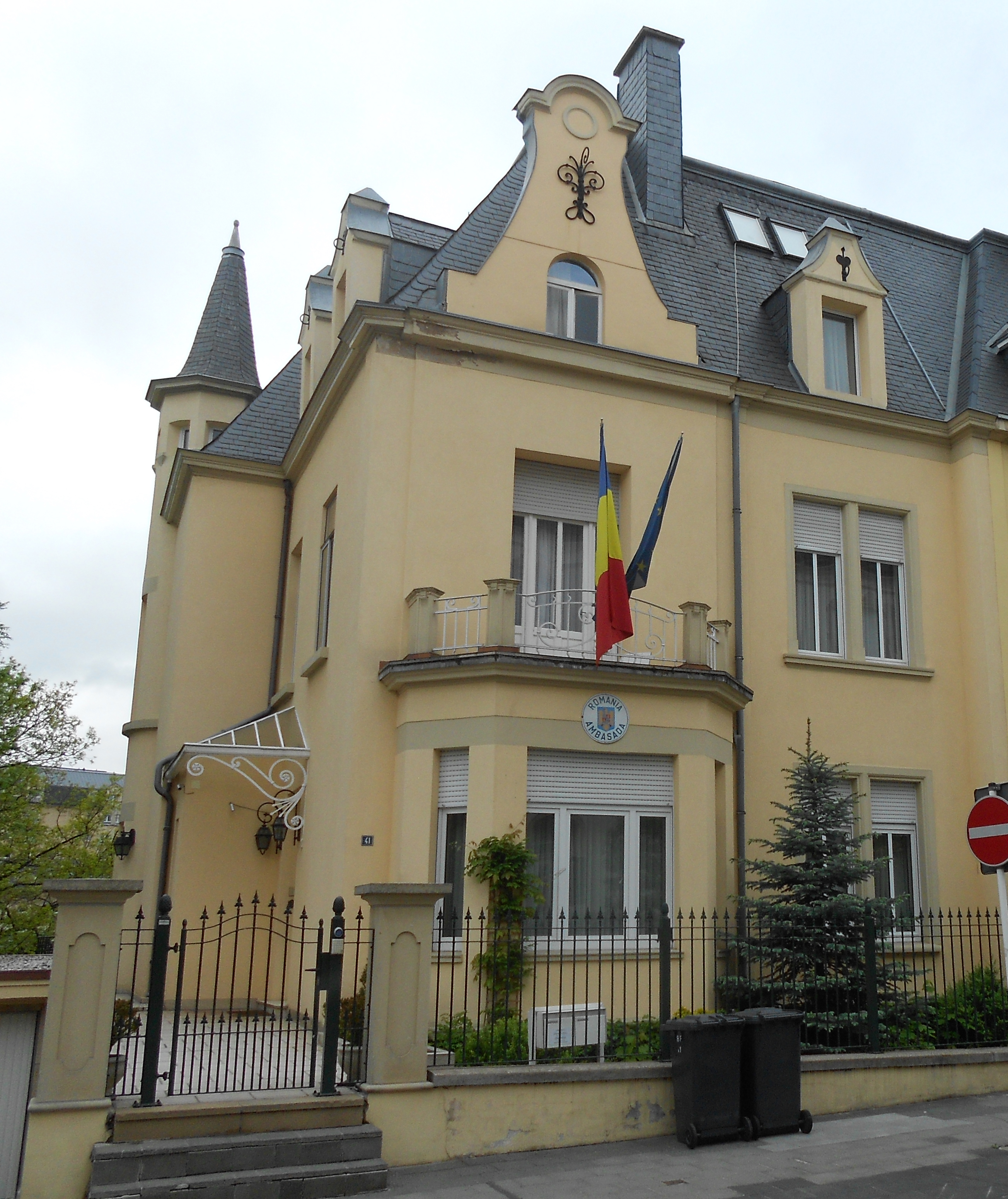
Embassy in Luxembourg

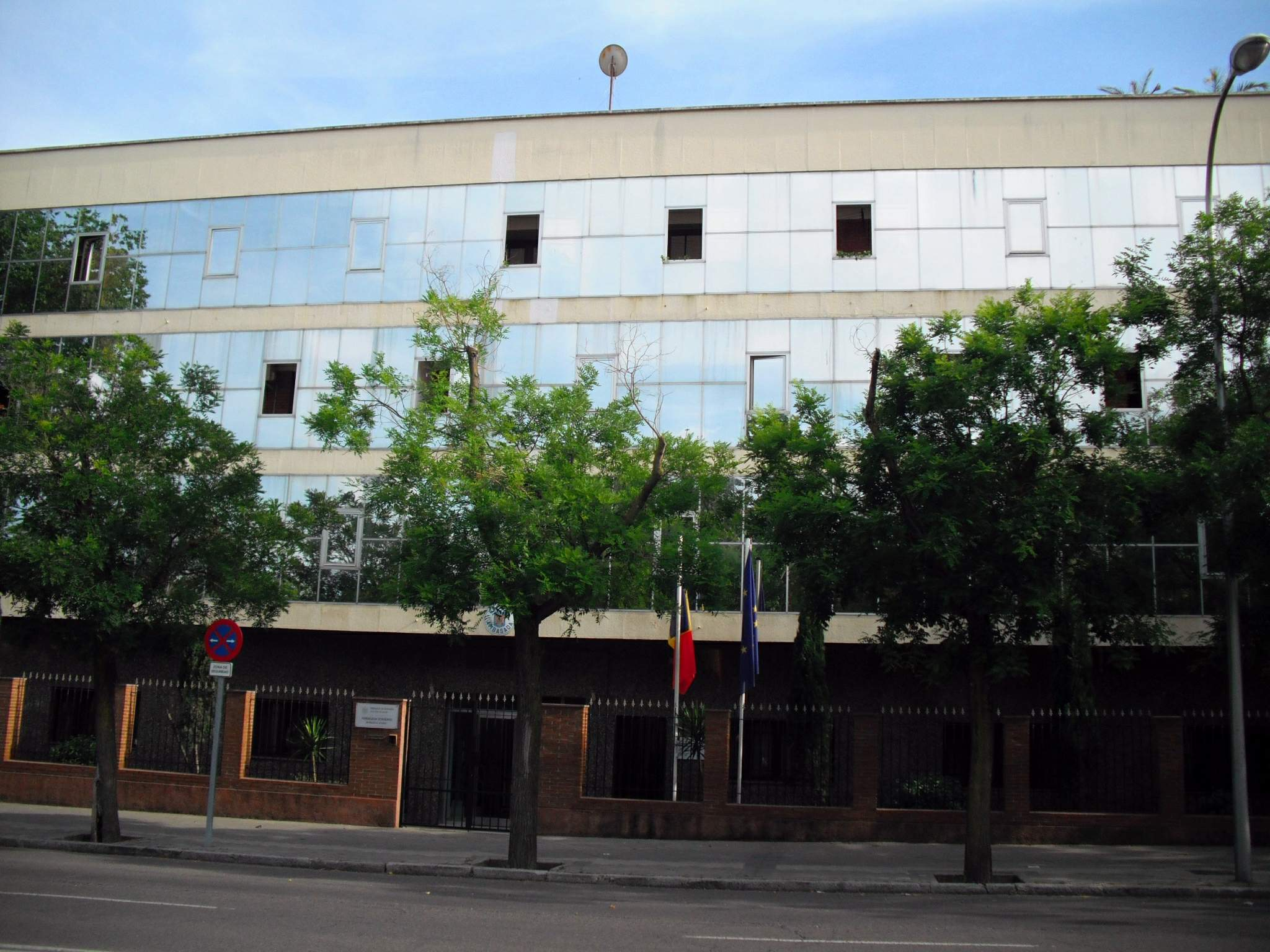
Embassy in Madrid

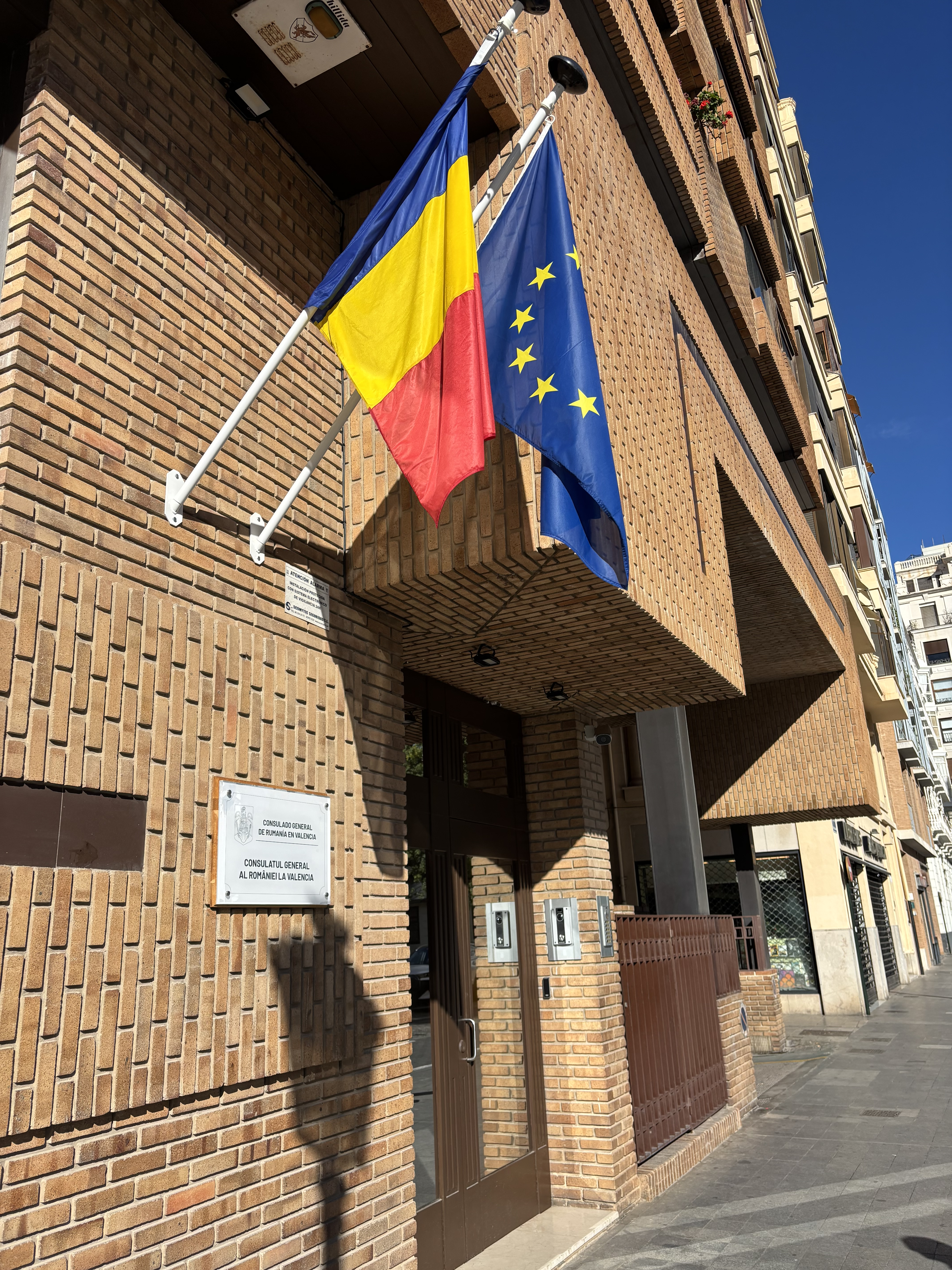
Consulate-General in Valencia

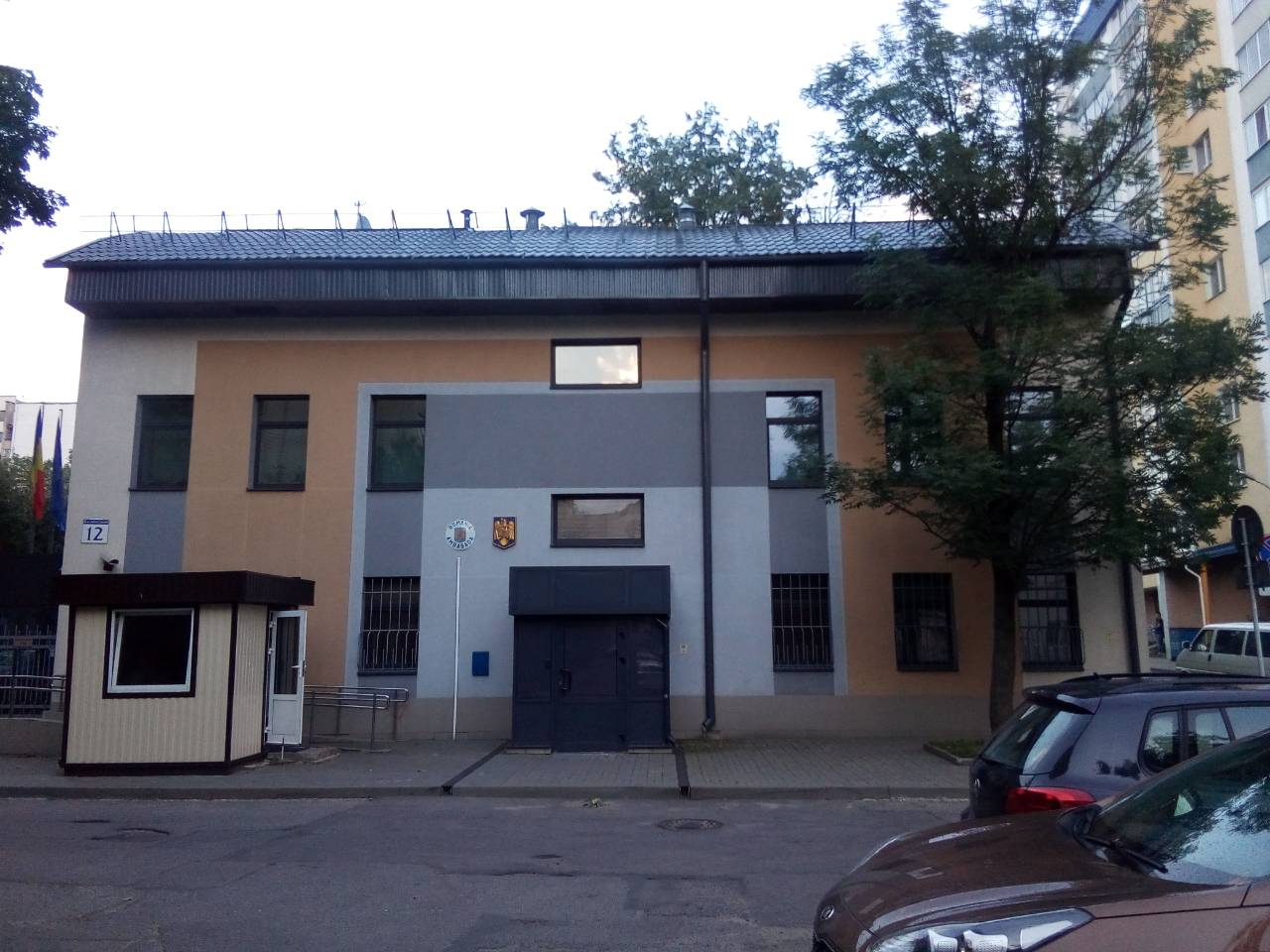
Embassy in Minsk

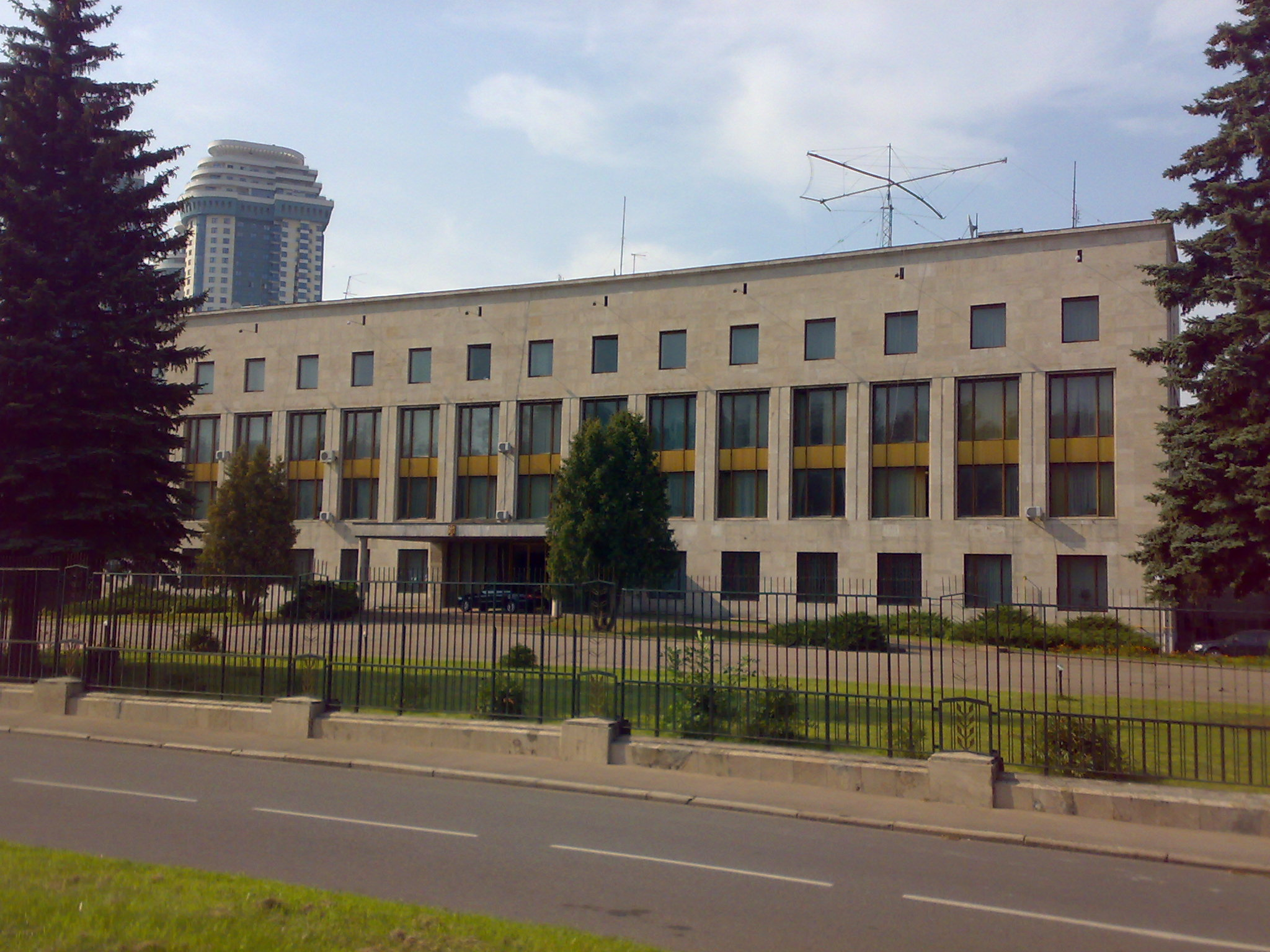
Embassy in Moscow

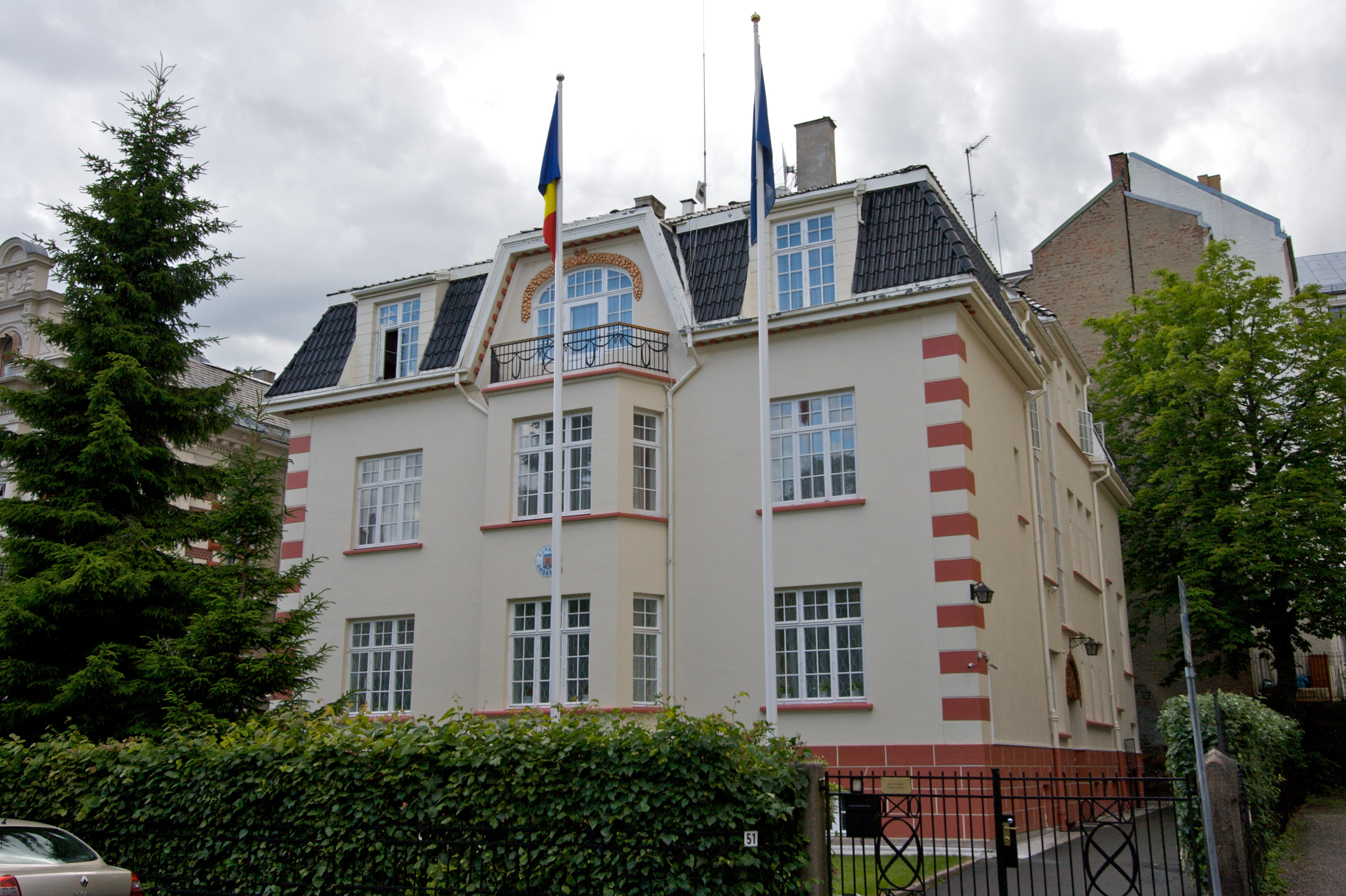
Embassy in Oslo

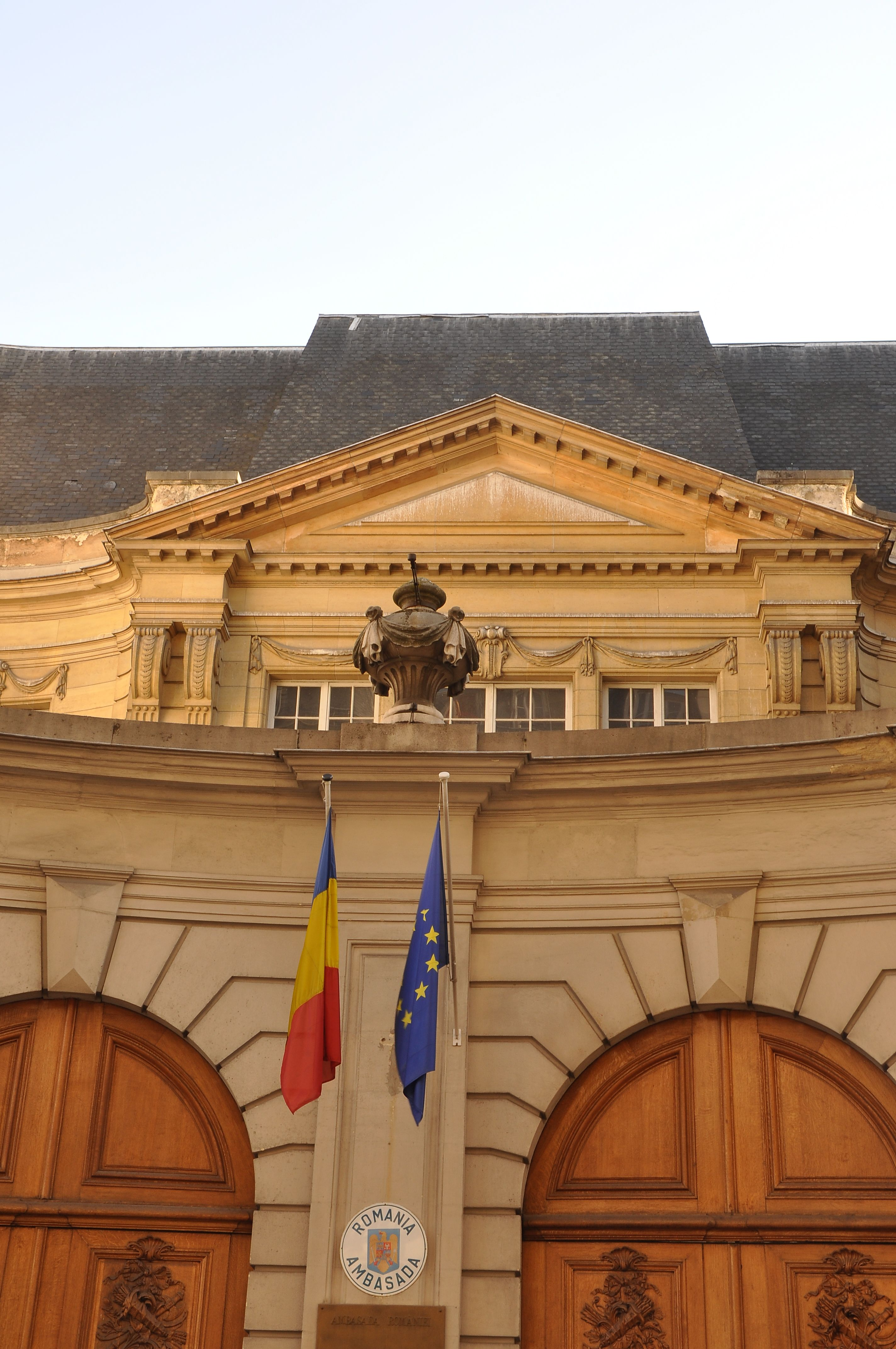
Embassy in Paris

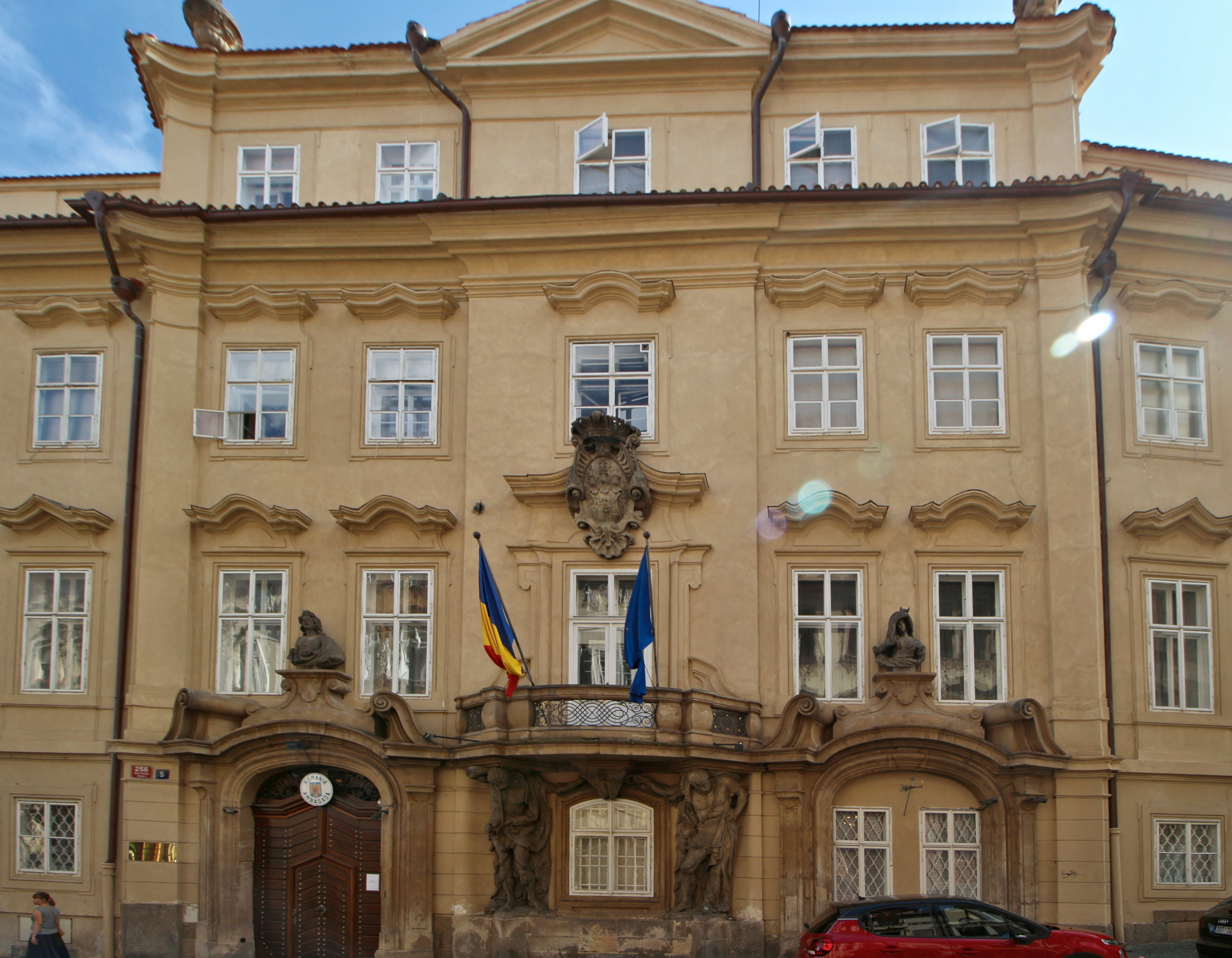
Embassy in Prague

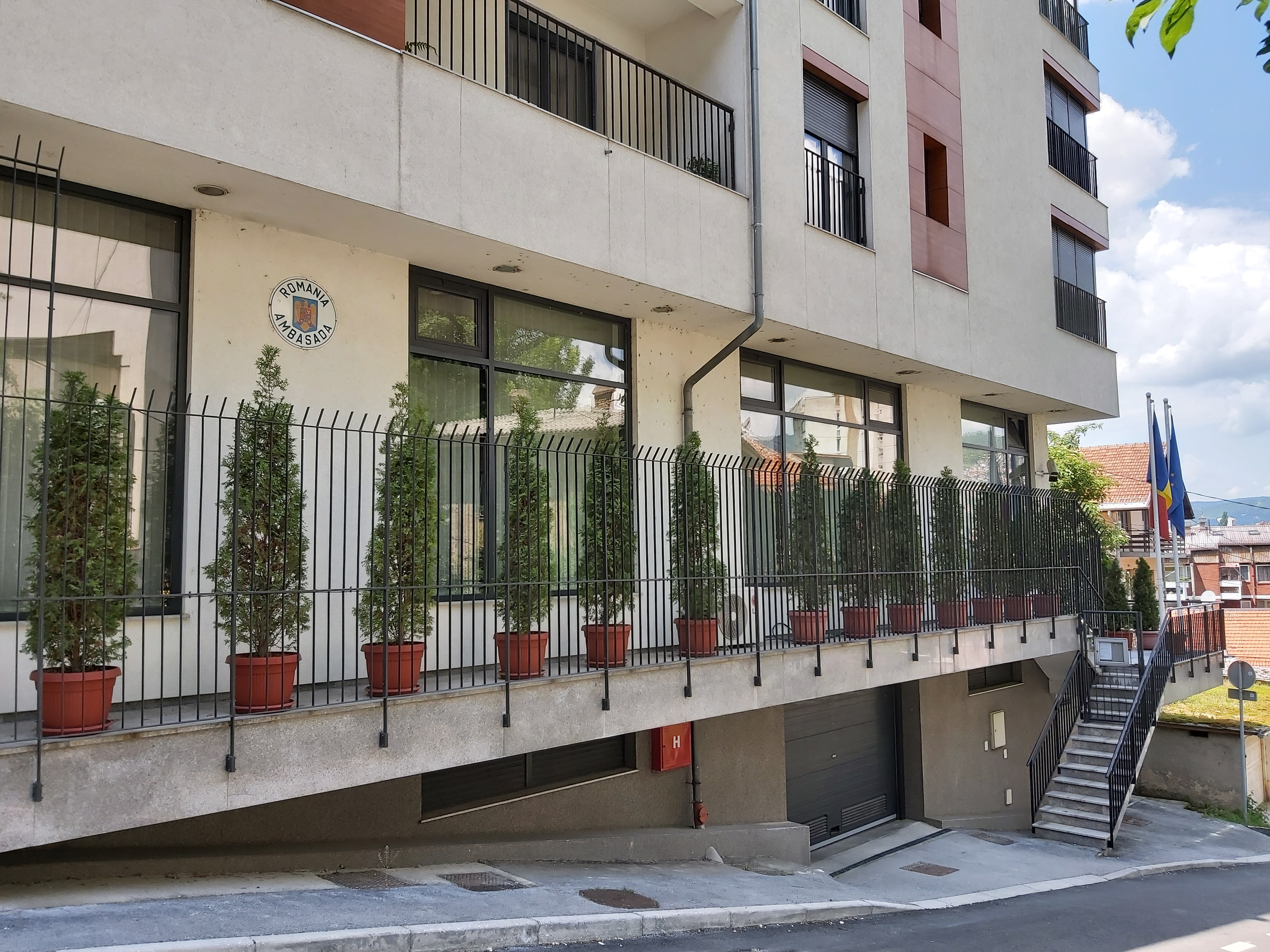
Embassy in Sarajevo

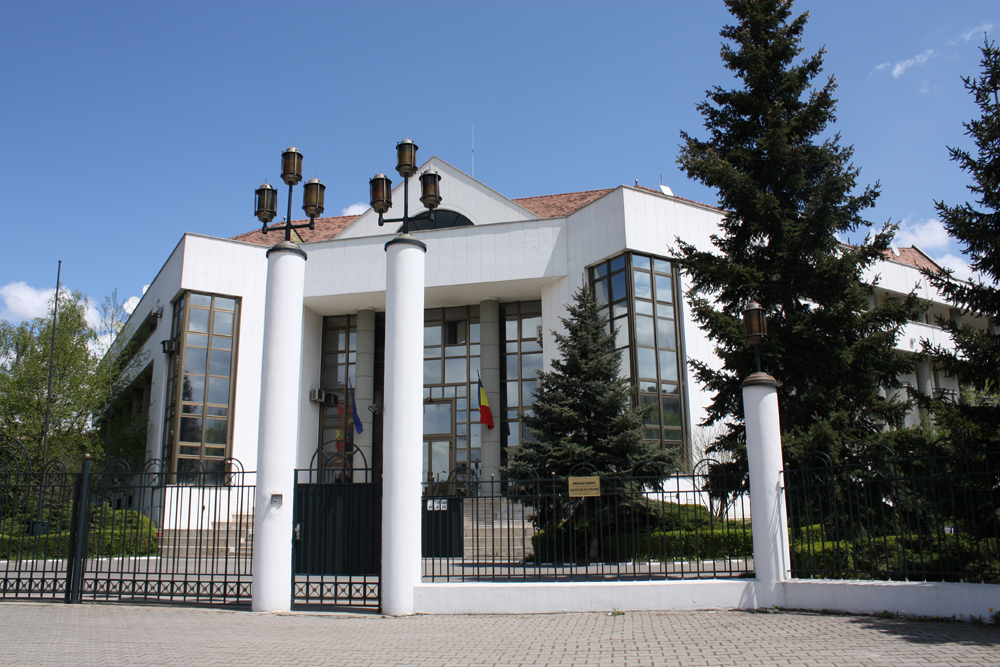
Embassy in Sofia

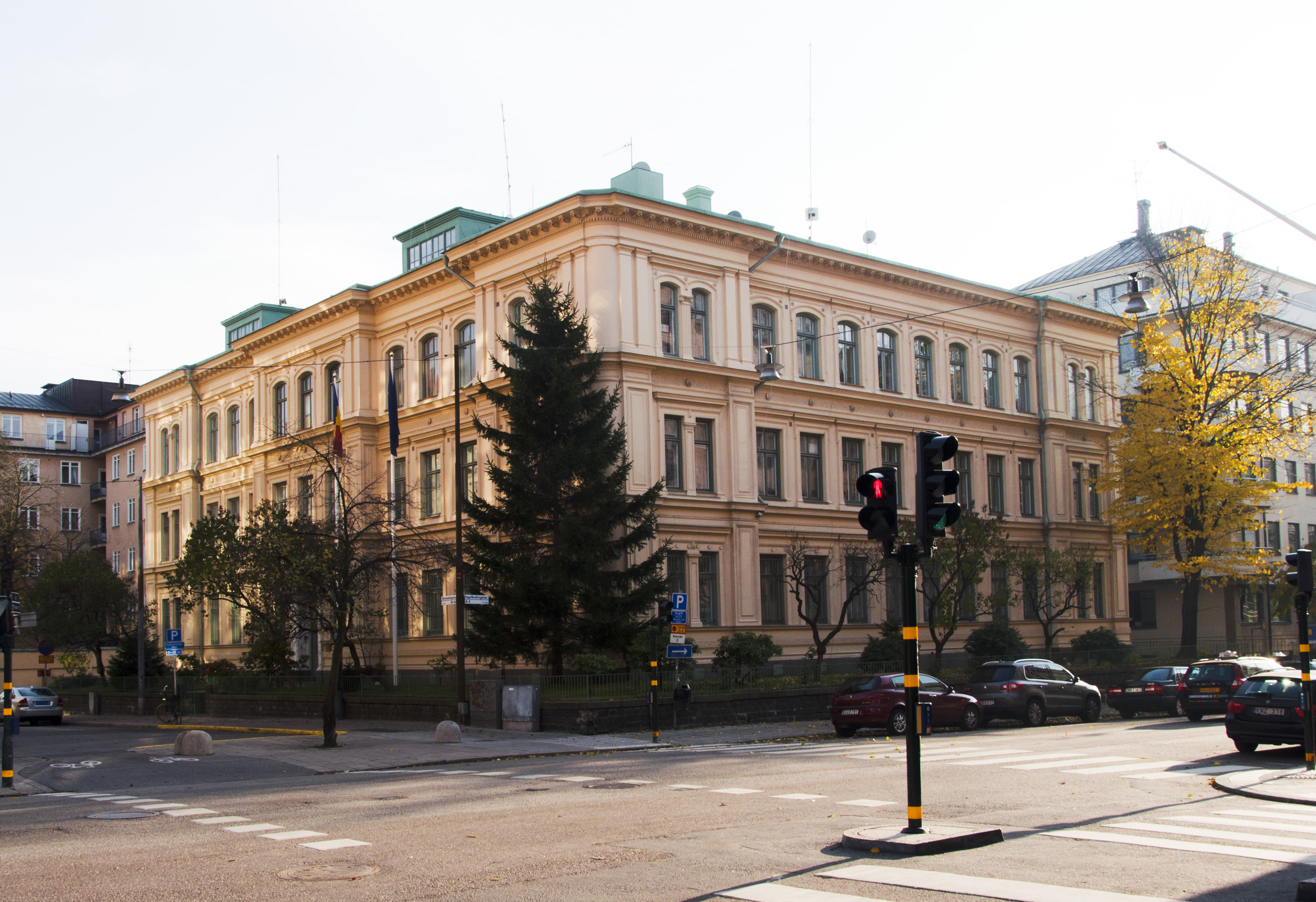
Embassy in Stockholm

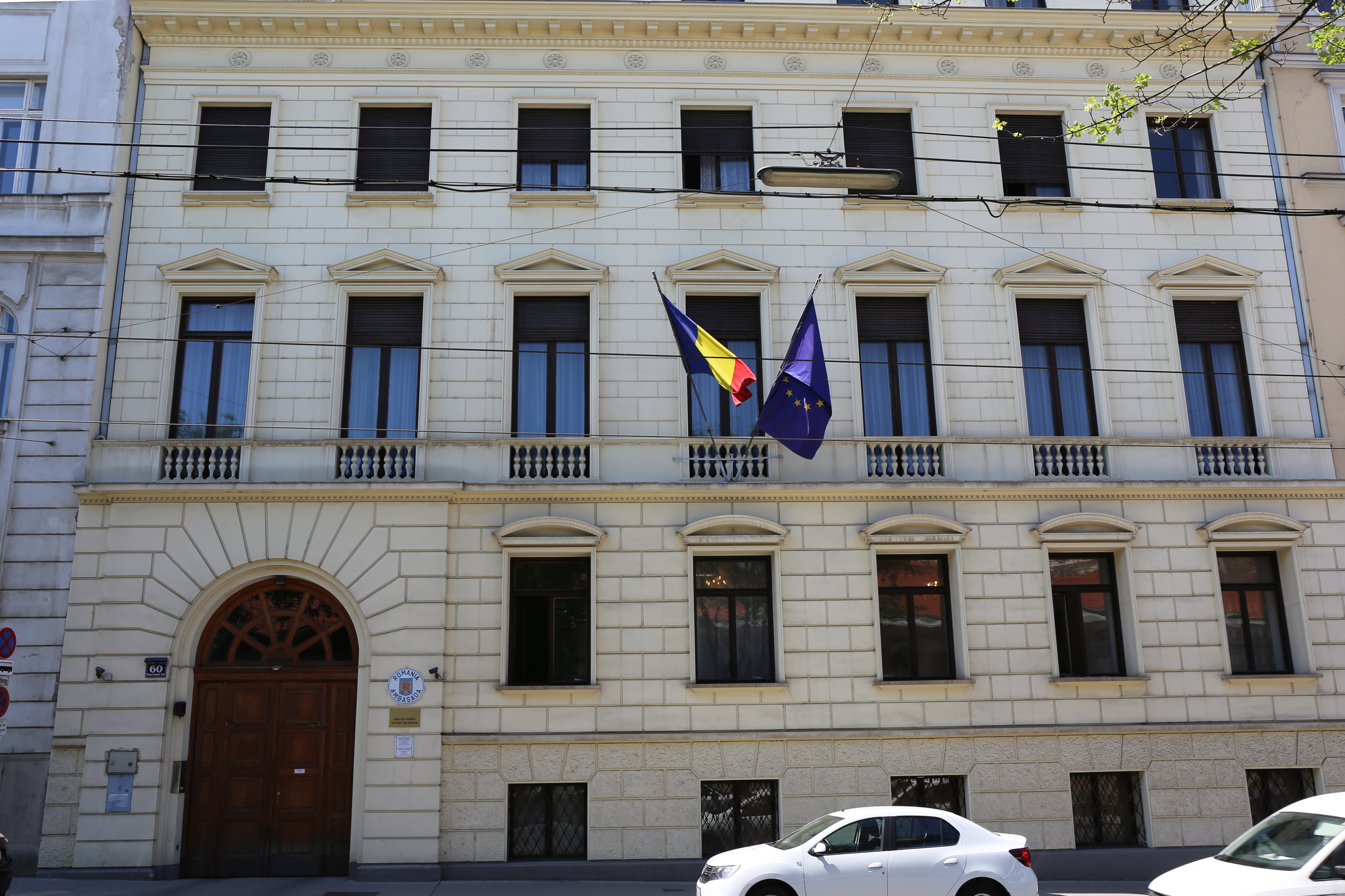
Embassy in Vienna

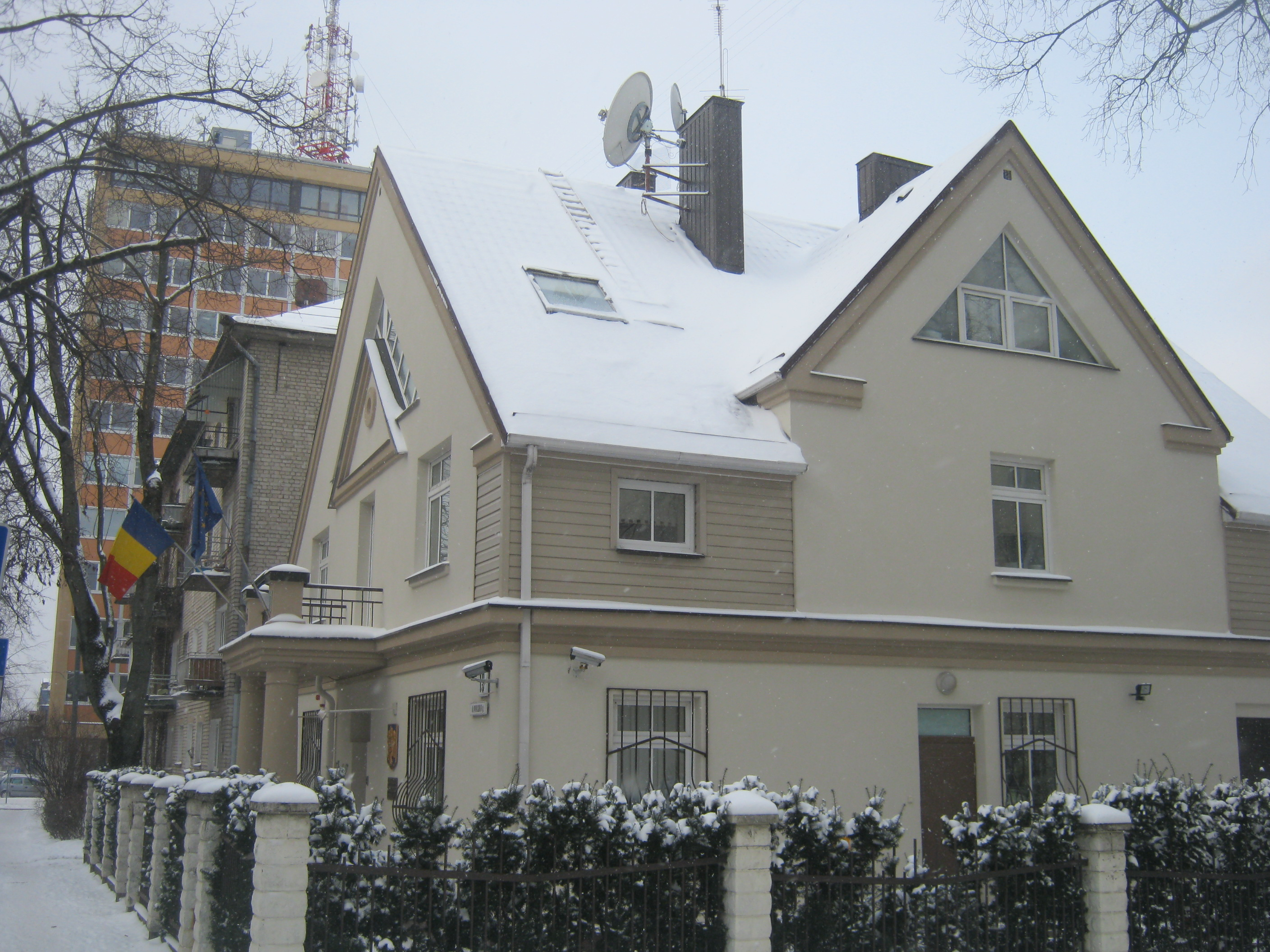
Embassy in Vilnius

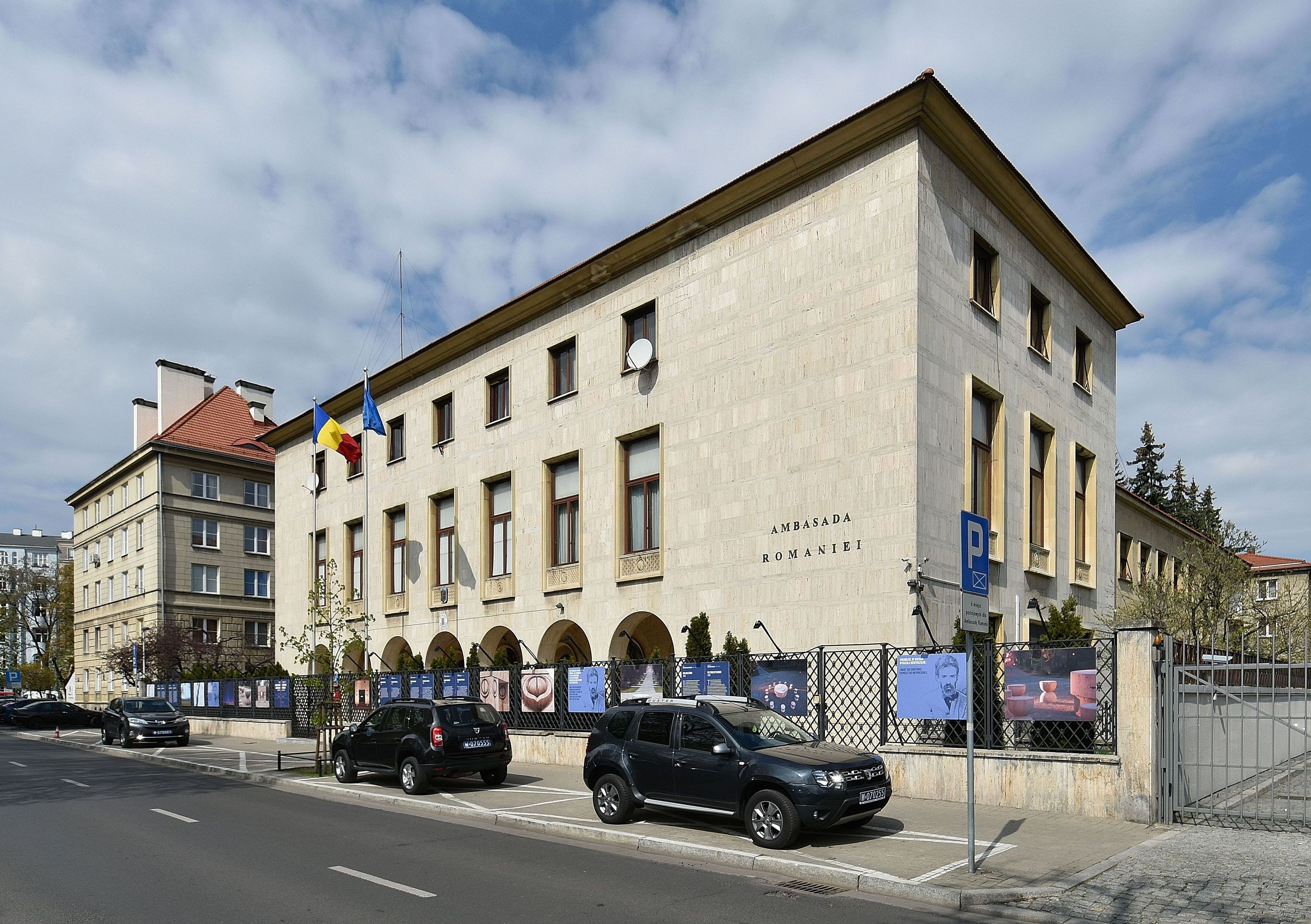
Embassy in Warsaw

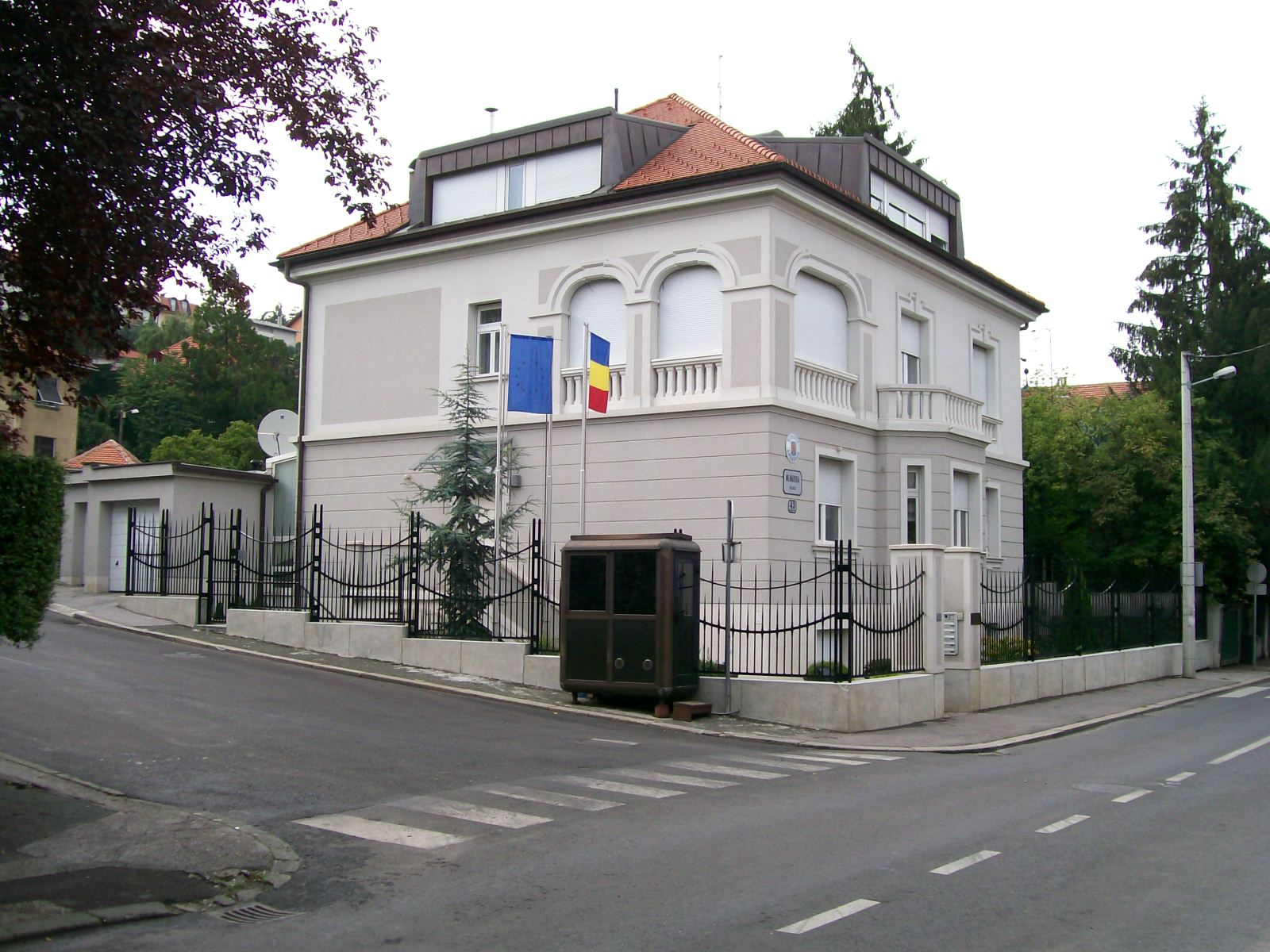
Embassy in Zagreb

=== Oceania ===
Host country	Host city	Mission	Concurrent accreditation	Ref.
Australia	Canberra	Embassy	Countries: Fiji; Nauru; New Zealand; Samoa; Solomon Islands; Tuvalu; Vanuatu; Kiribati	
Australia	Sydney	Consulate-General	Countries: Fiji; Nauru; New Zealand; Samoa; Solomon Islands; Tuvalu; Vanuatu; Kiribati	
Australia	Melbourne	Consulate	Countries: Fiji; Nauru; New Zealand; Samoa; Solomon Islands; Tuvalu; Vanuatu; Kiribati	

=== Multilateral organizations ===
Organization	Host city	Host country	Type of mission	Concurrent accreditation	Ref.
Council of Europe	Strasbourg	France	Permanent Representation		
European Union	Brussels	Belgium	Permanent Representation		
NATO	Brussels	Belgium	Permanent Delegation		
United Nations	New York City	United States	Permanent Mission		
United Nations	Geneva	Switzerland	Permanent Mission	International Organizations: Conference on Disarmament; World Health Organization; World Trade Organization	
United Nations	Vienna	Austria	Permanent Mission	International Organizations: OSCE; International Atomic Energy Agency; UNIDO; UNODC; UNCITRAL	
UNESCO	Paris	France	Permanent Delegation		

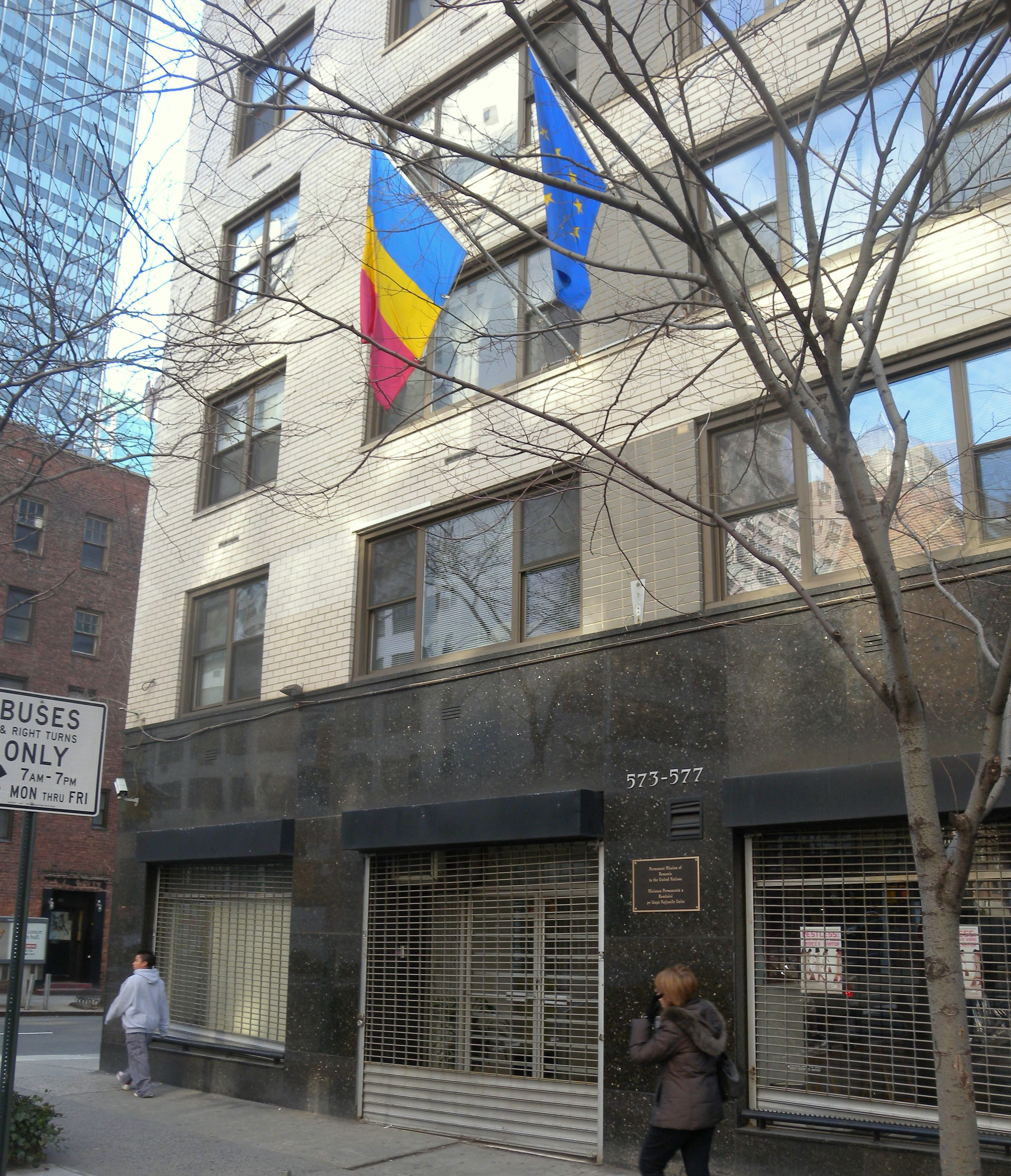
Permanent Mission to the United Nations in New York City

== Closed missions ==
=== Africa ===
Host country	Host city	Mission	Year closed	Ref.
Burundi	Bujumbura	Embassy	1996	
Central African Republic	Bangui	Embassy	1996	
Congo-Brazzaville	Brazzaville	Embassy	1995	
Congo-Kinshasa	Kinshasa	Embassy	1999	
Gabon	Libreville	Embassy	Unknown	
Ivory Coast	Abidjan	Embassy	1983	
Guinea	Conakry	Embassy	1999	
Libya	Tripoli	Embassy	2014	
Mauritania	Nouakchott	Embassy	1996	
Mozambique	Maputo	Embassy	1999	
Namibia	Windhoek	Embassy	1999	
Somali Democratic Republic	Mogadishu	Embassy	1991	
Sudan	Khartoum	Embassy	2021	
Tanzania	Dar Es Salaam	Embassy	1999	

=== Americas ===
Host country	Host city	Mission	Year closed	Ref.
Bolivia	La Paz	Embassy	2000	
Costa Rica	San José	Embassy	2000	
Ecuador	Quito	Embassy	2000	

=== Asia ===
Host country	Host city	Mission	Year closed	Ref.
Afghanistan	Kabul	Embassy	2019	
Bangladesh	Dhaka	Embassy	1996	
India	Mumbai	Consulate-General	Unknown	
Mongolia	Ulaanbaatar	Embassy	1995	
Myanmar	Yangon	Embassy	Unknown	
North Korea	Pyongyang	Embassy	2021	
Yemen	Sana'a	Embassy	2003	

=== Europe ===
Host country	Host city	Mission	Year closed	Ref.
Hungarian People's Republic	Debrecen	Consulate	1985	
Russia	Rostov-on-Don	Consulate-General	2024	

=== Oceania ===
Host country	Host city	Mission	Year closed	Ref.
New Zealand	Wellington	Embassy	1989	

== See also ==
- Foreign relations of Romania
- List of diplomatic missions in Romania
- List of Romanian diplomats
- Visa requirements for Romanian citizens
