= Dissent in Romania under Nicolae Ceaușescu =

Flag of the Socialist Republic of Romania without the coat of arms, used during the Romanian revolution

Dissent in Romania under Nicolae Ceaușescu describes the voicing of disagreements with the government policies of Communist Romania during the totalitarian rule of Nicolae Ceaușescu after the July Theses in 1971. Because of Ceaușescu's extensive secret police (the Securitate) and harsh punishments, open dissent was rare. Notable acts of dissent include Paul Goma's 1977 letters to Ceaușescu, the founding of SLOMR (an independent workers' union) in 1979 and a number of work conflicts, such as the Jiu Valley miners' strike of 1977 and the Braşov Rebellion of 1987.

Dissent from within the Romanian Communist Party came for the first time from Constantin Pîrvulescu, a veteran party member who, in 1979, during the 12th Party Congress, accused Ceaușescu of putting personal interests in front of those of the party. Pîrvulescu was excluded from the party, but, in 1989, together with other five party veterans signed the Letter of the Six, an open letter which was a left-wing critique of Ceaușescu.

The Romanian Revolution of December 1989 began as an act of dissent, as people began supporting Hungarian pastor László Tőkés, who was about to be evicted for dissent.

== 1960s counterculture ==
Starting with the mid-1960s, a counterculture developed in Romania among the Romanian youth and students. While this culture shared the aesthetics of the Western Counterculture of the 1960s (for instance hippie fashion or rock and roll) and its anti-authoritarianism, from an ideological point of view, it wasn't integrated in the worldwide countercultural movement. The counterculture used nationalist rhetoric and unlike its Western or Yugoslav counterpart, where it embraced the "New Left" and opposed the Vietnam War, in Romania, it was skeptical of socialism, even if liberal socialism. Although they were aware of the movements in the west, they never shared their goals or had any interest in declaring solidarity with them.

A dissident community flourished as Romania became more liberal and allowed more freedom of expression. Nonconformist literature, film, theatre, music, philosophy boomed as young intellectuals challenged the abuses of the early era of Socialist Romania and demanded more freedom of thought and expression, as well as a better standard of living. The counterculture did support some goals with the government, such as reform and the independence from the Soviet Union.

The end of the culture of protest within the counterculture came in December 1968 when a group of a few hundred student protesters were beaten by the police and their leaders were arrested. Ceaușescu warned against any art and political positions that were against the regime in 1969, while the following year, he explicitly banned such countercultural activities and in 1971, with the July Theses, a "mini-Cultural Revolution" began that demanded strict conformity.

The Romanian Communist Party took over the film, theatre and literary communities and demanded them to adhere to socialist realism. While this did not end the counterculture, it greatly diminished its scale. Critics of the regime were routinely harassed by the police, expelled from the party or fired their workplace and they often fled abroad. Some artists and intellectuals, such as Cornel Chiriac, fled to Western Europe, while others, such as Adrian Păunescu (who was attacked in 1972 for his subversive activities and complaints about censorship) joined the regime's propaganda machine.

== Goma's 1977 letters ==
Paul Goma, a Bessarabian-born writer, provided the earliest challenge to the Ceaușescu regime in the spring of 1977. Goma had challenged the previous communist governments of Romania: in 1956, he read at university a chapter of a novel describing a student movements similar to the one of Hungarian Revolution of 1956. In 1968, the manuscript for his novel, Obstinato, was denied publication and so was his next novel, Gherla, both of which were published in French and German translations.

Becoming frustrated with the ban of his writings and inspired by the Czechoslovak Charter 77, Goma wrote a letter of support to Pavel Kohout. Finding few friends willing to sign it, he invited Nicolae Ceaușescu to sign it. In a letter addressed to Ceaușescu, he told him that he can't find people to sign the letter because they are afraid of the Securitate and that the only two Romanians not afraid of the Securitate are him and Ceaușescu.

Despite the intimidations of the Securitate, Goma's letter got over 200 signatures (including the support of psychiatrist Ion Vianu and literary critic Ion Negoiţescu), but it was denounced by Ceaușescu, who attacked "the traitors of the country". As he wrote an even harsher letter to Ceaușescu, Goma was excluded from the Writers' Union, arrested and attacked in a variety of magazines such as Săptămâna, Luceafărul and Contemporanul. After an international appeal, he was released and in November 1977 he went into exile in France.

Goma continued to criticize the Ceaușescu regime from Paris and in 1982, the Romanian authorities ordered a Romanian secret agent, Matei Pavel Haiducu, to kill Goma, together with another dissident, Virgil Tănase by injecting a poison which would cause cardiac arrest. Nevertheless, Haiducu refused the order by defecting to the French authorities.

== Labour disputes ==
=== Jiu Valley miners' strike of 1977 ===
Only a few months after Goma's letters, the first major strike occurred on a Romanian company. The immediate cause of the strike was the new July 1977 legislation which ended disability pensions for miners and increased the retirement age for miners from 50 to 53. Ceaușescu made a commission led by Ilie Verdeț to go to Lupeni and discuss with the miners, but they were apprehended by the miners, who demanded Ceaușescu to come.

Ceaușescu came to Lupeni on the same day and in front of the angry crowd, he agreed to have a six-hour day throughout the Jiu Valley, to build factories that would provide employment for the miners' wives and daughters and to that no punishment would be given against the miners who organized the strike. After this, the crowds dispersed and the miners continued working.

The promises were not kept, as in the following months, the Securitate began its investigations and repression, with 4000 miners being sent to other mining areas and others imprisoned. Neither were the concessions regarding the six-hour day and the retirement age were kept, the only promise kept was about the creation of jobs for the miners' families. Throughout the Jiu Valley strikes, there was a total media blackout about the event.

=== Free Trade Union of the Working People of Romania, 1979 ===
A group of 15 workers at the shipyards of Turnu Severin, helped by an MD, Ionel Cană, founded a free trade union, the founding declaration of which was broadcast on the Radio Free Europe on March 4, 1979. It soon attracted over 2400 signatures from workers throughout the country. They got the support of Paul Goma and Gheorghe Calciu, a dissident orthodox priest.

Its manifesto called for the legalization of independent trade unions and the right to free association. As some of its members, including Cană and economist Gheorghe Broșoveanu were arrested, the union protested against the repression through an open letter. The next chairman of the trade union was sentenced to 18 months in prison for "passing state secrets to Amnesty International".

=== Strikes during the austerity of the 1980s ===
Ceaușescu introduced a series of very harsh austerity measures in order to cut the imports and repay the debts acquired from the Western banks. Food and energy were rationized and the real value of the wage was cut.

In September 1983, miners from seven metal mines of Maramureș went on strike to protest pay cuts, the strike being quelled by the Securitate. Further strikes were started at the Heavy Machinery Plant and the Refrigeration Plant in Cluj-Napoca, as well as at the glass factory in Turda in November 1984 following the reduction of the bread ration and pay cuts for failure to fill the targets. Like in Jiu Valley, the Party promised to meet the demands of the workers and Securitate launched an investigation and moving some workers to other areas. On February 16, 1987, about a thousand employees of the Nicolina rolling stocks factory in Iași protested pay cuts; 150 of the strikers were fired from the factory.

=== Braşov strike of 1987 ===
On November 15, 1987, a group of several thousand workers from Steagul Roșu plant assembled in order to go and vote in the local elections. Instead they marched toward the city centre (where the local headquarters of the Party was located), singing "Deșteaptă-te, române!", the song of the 1848 Revolution and chanting "Down with the dictatorship!". They were joined by Braşov tractor plant workers and Brașov locals.

It was five days after the implementation of a decree on reducing the heating on private dwellings (part of the 1980s austerity policy in Romania) and after a second month with wage cuts due to failure to meet production targets (which couldn't be done due to lack of commercial orders), corroborated with food shortages.

The apparatchiks fled from the Party headquarters through the back entrance while the crowd tore down the headquarters' sign, smashed the windows, forced their way inside by breaking the wooden gates and destroyed the content, throwing posters, files, equipment onto the street. These were set alight and a similar ransacking occurred on the People's Council building on the opposite side of the road.

Soon, police and military vehicles carrying armed soldiers came, as the people in the crowd tried to flee. Some were beaten up and arrested, while others were arrested from their home in the middle of the night. The following days, all the outstanding debts to the workers had been paid and food shops had been stocked.

The state media kept silence about the protests for weeks and it only acknowledged the disturbances on December 2, when Radio Bucharest announced that the workers' representatives decided to dismiss the management which had illegally reduced the wages of the workers. It also noted that the workers "who engaged in acts that are alien to our society" will be moved or be punished according to the law.

The Securitate investigated the protests and, by December, it compiled a list of 425 workers who were held. The group trial led to 60 protesters to be jailed for "hooliganism", being sentenced for jail terms of between one and four years.

== Dissent from within the Party ==
The earliest case of dissent from within the Party occurred during the 12th Party Congress, when Constantin Pîrvulescu, an old-time party member, took the floor and argued against the re-election of Ceaușescu, arguing that he puts the personal glorification in front of the interest of the Party and the country. As a result, he was stripped of his delegate to the congress and placed under house arrest.

Following the Braşov Rebellion, on November 26, 1987, former deputy director of Scînteia Silviu Brucan handed a declaration to some foreign journalists, in which he warned Ceaușescu that "a period of crisis has opened up in relations between the Romanian Communist Party and the working class" and he warned that this may lead to an isolation from both the West and the East. Brucan was reprimanded by the Party and put under house arrest, but he was released following a visit of the American United States Deputy Secretary of State John C. Whitehead to Bucharest.

Dumitru Mazilu, a Romanian official was commissioned by the UN Sub-Commission on Prevention of Discrimination and Protection of Minorities in 1985 to write a report on human rights in Romania. He was due to present it in Geneva in June 1987, but he was prevented by the Romanian state. The official explanation was that he had a heart attack, but Mazilu eventually sent in 1988 a letter to the Chairman of the UN subcommission in which he talked about repressive measures taken against him after he refused to give up working on this project, including surveillance and intimidation.

On March 10, 1989, six senior members (Silviu Brucan, Gheorghe Apostol, Alexandru Bârlădeanu, Grigore Răceanu, Corneliu Mănescu and Constantin Pîrvulescu) of the Romanian Communist Party signed a letter (the Letter of the Six) made public to BBC. Since they sent the letter directly abroad rather than discussing it in the Party, it shows that the Party was completely under the rule of Ceaușescu and that no party mechanism allowed discussion of party policy.

Unlike Doina Cornea, they did not argue for a democratic pluralism, but only a pluralism within the party. They argued that the "very idea of socialism" was being threatened by Ceaușescu's policies. The letter discussed the Systematization, the lack of observance of human rights and that in practice, the constitution was suspended and that there was no legal system in force.
