= Ion Gheorghe Maurer =

Romanian communist politician and lawyer (1902–2000)

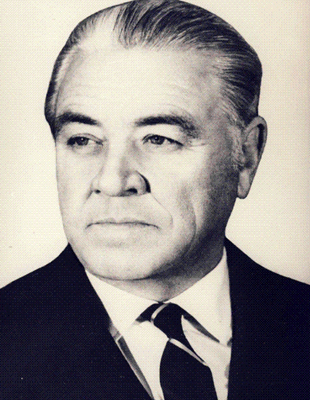

President of the Presidium of the Great National Assembly
- In office 11 January 1958 – 21 March 1961
- Prime Minister: Chivu Stoica
- Preceded by: Petru Groza; Mihail Sadoveanu and Anton Moisescu (acting)
- Succeeded by: Gheorghe Gheorghiu-Dej (as President of the State Council)

President of the State Council
- (Acting)
- In office 19 March 1965 – 24 March 1965 Serving with Ștefan Voitec & Avram Bunaciu
- Preceded by: Gheorghe Gheorghiu-Dej
- Succeeded by: Chivu Stoica

President of the Council of Ministers
- In office 21 March 1961 – 27 February 1974
- President: Gheorghe Gheorghiu-Dej; Chivu Stoica; Nicolae Ceaușescu
- Preceded by: Chivu Stoica
- Succeeded by: Manea Mănescu

Vice President of the State Council
- In office 1961–1967
- President: Gheorghe Gheorghiu-Dej; Chivu Stoica
- Preceded by: Position established
- Succeeded by: Emil Bodnăraș

Minister of Foreign Affairs
- In office 15 July 1957 – 15 January 1958
- Prime Minister: Chivu Stoica
- Preceded by: Grigore Preoteasa
- Succeeded by: Avram Bunaciu

Personal details
- Born: Jean Georges Maurer; 23 September [O.S. 10 September] 1902 Bucharest, Kingdom of Romania
- Died: 8 February 2000 (aged 97) Bucharest, Romania
- Party: Romanian Communist Party (1937—1989)
- Other political affiliations: Radical Peasants' Party (before 1937); National Liberal Party–Brătianu (1937); National Peasants' Party (1937—1938)
- Spouse: Elena Maurer (m. 1949; died 1999)
- Profession: Lawyer

Ion Gheorghe Maurer (Note: Romanian pronunciation: [iˈon ˈɡe̯orɡe ˈmawrər]) (23 September [O.S. 9 September] 1902 – 8 February 2000) was a Romanian communist politician and lawyer, and the 49th Prime Minister of Romania. He is the longest serving Prime Minister in the history of Romania (having served for 12 years and 343 days).

Maurer is considered one of the most effective political leaders of communist Romania; a pragmatist, during his tenure, a more nationalist form of Romanian communism was consolidated, the standard of living increased significantly, political repression was relaxed, and externally, Romania distanced itself from the USSR in favor of rapprochement with China and other third world states, but also with states of the Western world.

== Early life, family, and education ==
Listed in his birth certificate as Jean Georges Maurer, he was born in Bucharest to an Alsatian father of German descent and a French mother with a petit-bourgeois background. He completed his law degree at the University of Bucharest in 1923, after which he pursued graduate studies at the Sorbonne in Paris. Upon returning to Romania, he became an attorney, practicing law in Sighișoara, then serving as a public prosecutor and later as judge. In 1932 he went to Bucharest to work as counsel for several large banks.

The first wife was named Dana Gavrilovici, according to other sources, Lucreția. She was older than him and had two daughters with him as well as a son from her first marriage, Alexandru Niculescu, who became an officer. He remarried in 1949 to Elena (Lili) Stănescu, ex-wife of his friend N. D. Cocea and with whom he had a son, Jean Maurer, who lives in Munich. His wife died a year before his death, but fearing a heart attack his son kept this fact a secret, so Maurer died believing his wife was still alive and being treated in a hospital.

== Political career ==
He became active politically, defending members of illegal leftist and anti-fascist movements in court. Occasionally, as in the 1936 Craiova Trial of Romanian Communist Party (PCR) activists, including Ana Pauker, Alexandru Drăghici, and Alexandru Moghioroș, he assisted Lucrețiu Pătrășcanu.

Before 1937, he was briefly active in the Radical Peasants' Party, formed by Grigore Iunian as a splinter group of the National Peasants' Party; however, he was by then already a member of the illegal Communist Party and active in the Agitprop section. He was then tasked by the Communists to infiltrate the mainstream political parties, running for a mandate in the Chamber of Deputies in 1937 from PNL-Brătianu, and in 1938 from PNȚ.

In 1942–1943, during World War II he was imprisoned for his political activity (notably, in the Târgu Jiu internment camp), and, as a member of a paramilitary grouping, played a secondary part in the events of 23 August 1944 that led to the downfall of the Ion Antonescu regime. During this time, although present among the few active leaders of the Party around general secretary Ștefan Foriș, he became a supporter of Gheorghe Gheorghiu-Dej's faction (dominated by imprisoned activists). In 1944, he played a hand in Foriș's deposition, assisting Emil Bodnăraș and Gheorghiu-Dej.

After the war, Maurer became a member of the Central Committee of the Romanian Workers' Party (the new name of the PCR after it had incorporated the Social Democratic Party) and took several ministerial positions in the new communist government of Romania — including that of undersecretary of the Communications and Public Works Ministry under Gheorghiu-Dej in the first Petru Groza government. On 7 August 1945, he was awarded the Order of the Crown of Romania, Grand Officer class. In 1946–1947, he was a member of Romania's delegation to the Paris Peace Conference (headed by Gheorghe Tătărescu) and was briefly employed by Ana Pauker at the Foreign Ministry, before being dismissed for having an unsatisfactory level of political conviction. He was removed from the forefront for the following decade, working for the Institute of Juridical Research.

He supported Gheorghiu-Dej's nationalist policy, eventually becoming foreign minister of Romania in 1957 (replacing Grigore Preoteasa), holding office for six months, and serving in the delegations establishing closer contacts with the People's Republic of China during the Sino-Soviet split and a détente with France in 1959.

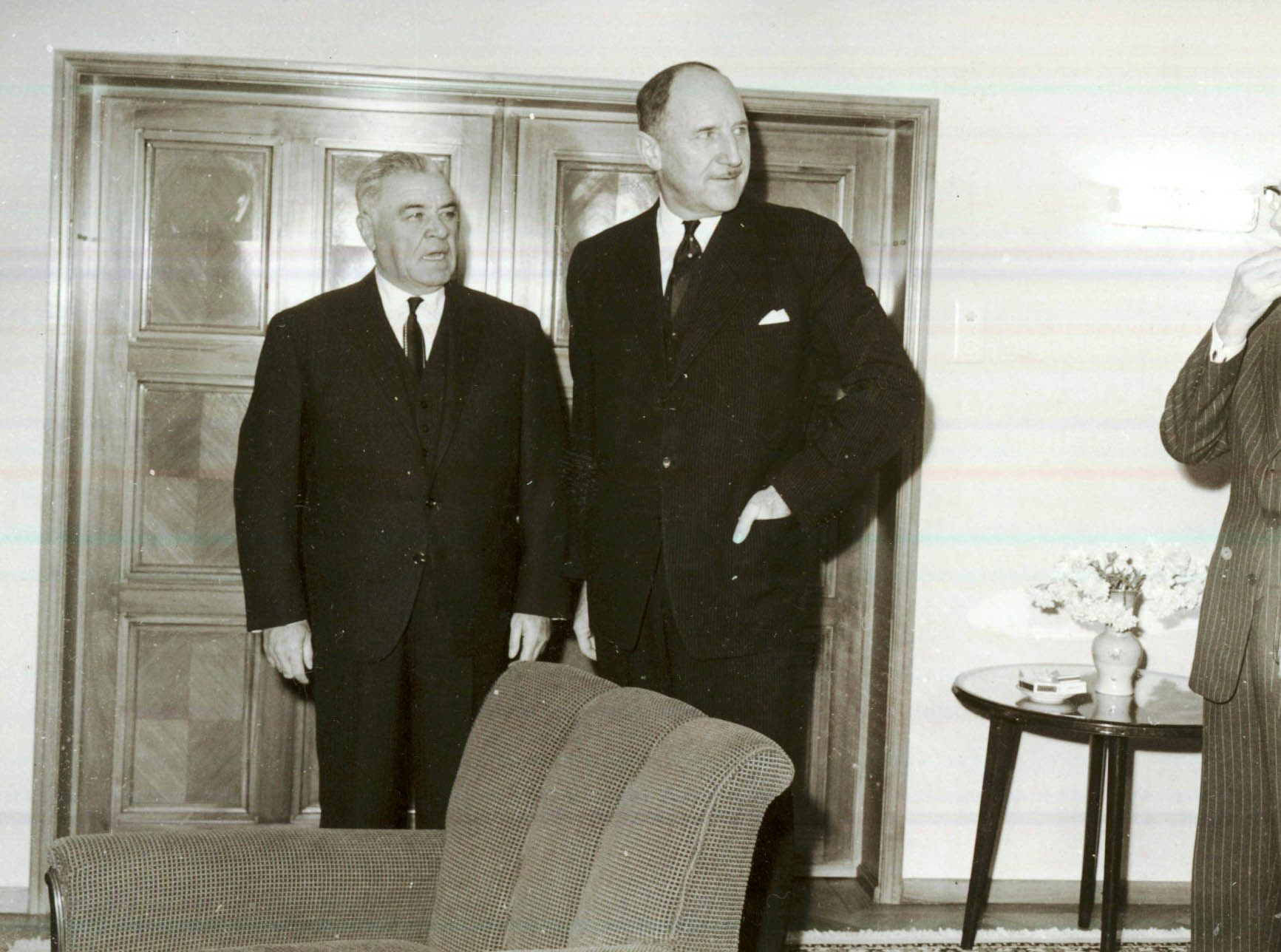
Ion Gheorghe Maurer and Joseph Luns in 1967

Regarded, according to the claims of dissident journalist Victor Frunză, as Gheorghiu-Dej's chosen successor, Maurer was head of state (President of the Presidium of the Great National Assembly of Romania) from 1958 to 1961. He took the seat previously occupied by Constantin Pîrvulescu on the Politburo, and then replaced Chivu Stoica as Prime Minister of Romania in 1961. In the latter capacity, he was the recipient of a 1963 letter by the British philosopher and activist Bertrand Russell, who pleaded with the Romanian authorities to free Belu Zilber (a victim of the conflict between the Party leadership and Pătrășcanu, Zilber had been a political prisoner for sixteen years by then) from jail. Maurer was also one of three acting Chairmen of the State Council of Romania (heads of state) between March 19 and March 24, 1965.

Alongside Emil Bodnăraș, Maurer was an important member of the Politburo in opposing the ambitions of Gheorghe Apostol and, together with Bodnăraș, aiding in the establishment of the Nicolae Ceaușescu regime. Among others, Maurer helped silence potential opposition from inside the Party by withdrawing his support for Corneliu Mănescu and welcoming Ceaușescu's directives, before being himself criticized and sidelined (at the same time as his collaborator Alexandru Bârlădeanu). Pensioned in 1974, he was still present in the forefront at most Party ceremonies.

A prominent member of the nomenklatura for much of his life, he was known for his latent conflict with a large part of the PCR hierarchy. He accumulated sizable wealth and was known for his ostentatious lifestyle. In 1989, Maurer's earlier support for Ceaușescu led the sidelined PCR members who were planning to state their opposition to the regime by drafting the so-called Letter of the Six (Gheorghe Apostol, Alexandru Bârlădeanu, Silviu Brucan, Constantin Pîrvulescu, and Grigore Răceanu) not to enlist his assistance in the process.

== Last years ==
After the Romanian Revolution of December 1989, he continued living in his lavish villa in the Primăverii district of Bucharest. He died in early 2000, a few months after his wife, leaving a son, Jean. He was 97. After the death of Former Greek Prime Minister Konstantinos Kollias on 13 July 1998, he became the eldest living former state leader both in Europe and worldwide.

== Notes ==
Party political offices
Preceded by Petru Groza	President of the Presidium of the Great National Assembly of Romania; 11 January 1958 – 21 March 1961	Succeeded by Gheorghe Gheorghiu-Dej(as President of the State Council)
Preceded by Chivu Stoica	Prime Minister of Romania; 21 March 1961 – 29 March 1974	Succeeded by Manea Mănescu
