= List of ambassadors of Romania to the United States =

This is a list of the heads of the diplomatic representatives of Romania to the United States. Italics indicate ad-interim representatives.

== Legation ==
- Constantin Angelescu, January 15, 1918
- Nicolae Henrik Lahovary, March 16, 1918
- Antoine Bibesco, February 25, 1921
- Frederick Nano, February 24, 1926
- Radu T. Djuvara, April 9, 1926
- George Cretziano, November 15, 1926
- Charles A. Davila, October 15, 1929
- Mircea Victor Babeș, February 1, 1938
- Radu Irimescu, April 11, 1938 / April 21, 1938
- Brutus Coste, October 15, 1940
- Vasile Stoica May 27, 1941

December 12, 1941 – September 20, 1946: State of War

- Mihai Ralea, appointed September 20, 1946; October 1, 1946
- Mihai Magheru, appointed September 21, 1949; September 26, 1949
- Marin Florea Ionescu, appointed April 15, 1953; May 4, 1953
- Anton Moisescu, appointed November 26, 1954; December 7, 1954
- Silviu Brucan, appointed April 9, 1956; April 30, 1956
- George Macovescu, appointed August 12, 1959; August 21, 1959
- Petre Bălăceanu, December 12, 1961

== Embassy ==
- Petre Bălăceanu, appointed July 27, 1964; August 14, 1964
- Corneliu Bogdan, appointed July 19, 1967; July 27, 1967
- Gheorghe Ioniță, appointed June 3, 1976
- Nicolae M. Nicolae, appointed June 18, 1976; July 9, 1976
- Ion Beșteliu, August 11, 1978
- Nicolae Ionescu, appointed October 3, 1978; November 16, 1978
- Eugen Popa, March 24, 1982
- Mircea Malița, appointed April 30, 1982; June 25, 1982
- Nicolae Gavrilescu, appointed April 9, 1985; May 22, 1985
- Ion Stoichici, appointed September 28, 1987; October 20, 1987
- Virgil Constantinescu, appointed February 13, 1990; April 9, 1990
- Aurel-Dragoș Munteanu, appointed April 6, 1992; May 5, 1992
- Mihai Horia Botez, appointed September 20, 1994; November 21, 1994
- Mircea Dan Geoană, appointed February 1, 1996; February 6, 1996
- Sorin Dumitru Ducaru, appointed May 25, 2001; June 20, 2001
- Adrian Cosmin Vierița, appointed January 2, 2008; January 22, 2008
- Iulian Buga, appointed November 19, 2013; December 3, 2013
- George Cristian Maior, appointed September 1, 2015; September 17, 2015
- Andrei Muraru, appointed July 7, 2021

== See also ==
- Romania–United States relations
- Embassy of Romania, Washington, D.C.
- List of diplomatic missions of Romania
- List of diplomatic missions in the United States
- List of ambassadors of the United States to Romania
