= Răceanu =

Răceanu is a surname of Romanian origin. Notable people with the surname include:

- Grigore Răceanu (1906–1996), Romanian communist politician
- Mircea Răceanu, Romanian diplomat, adopted son of Grigore
