= Constantin Agiu =

Late Romanian Communist politician and former President of the Great National Assembly

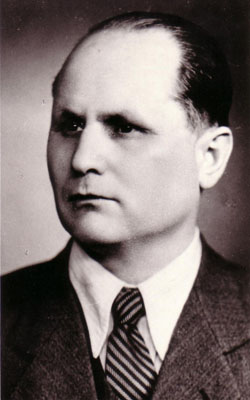

President of the Great National Assembly
- In office June 1948 – December 1948
- Preceded by: Gheorghe Apostol
- Succeeded by: Constantin Pârvulescu

Personal details
- Born: 5 November 1891 Cetate, Dolj, Kingdom of Romania
- Died: 19 February 1961 (aged 69) Gura Humorului, People's Republic of Romania
- Party: Communist Party of Romania

Constantin Agiu (November 5, 1891, Dolj County – February 19, 1961, Gura Humorului) was a Romanian Communist politician; he was also President of the Great National Assembly, the unicameral legislature of the Romanian People's Republic.

== Biography ==
He was a carpenter. A member of the Communist Party of Romania (PCR), he was noted by Ștefan Foriș and appointed a party instructor for Oltenia (1941), and from June 1943 he was a member of the Romanian Communist Party Central Committee. During World War II, together with Foriș, Remus Koffler, Iosif Rangheț, Constantin Pîrvulescu, and Lucrețiu Pătrășcanu, he belonged to the small clandestine party faction that was active inside Romania. Even after April 4, 1944 (when Foriș was removed from the office of general secretary), he held important positions. For example, he was in charge of revenue control by the Central Financial Commission of the PCR, or conducting negotiations with the PSD for the realization of the Unique Workers' Front.

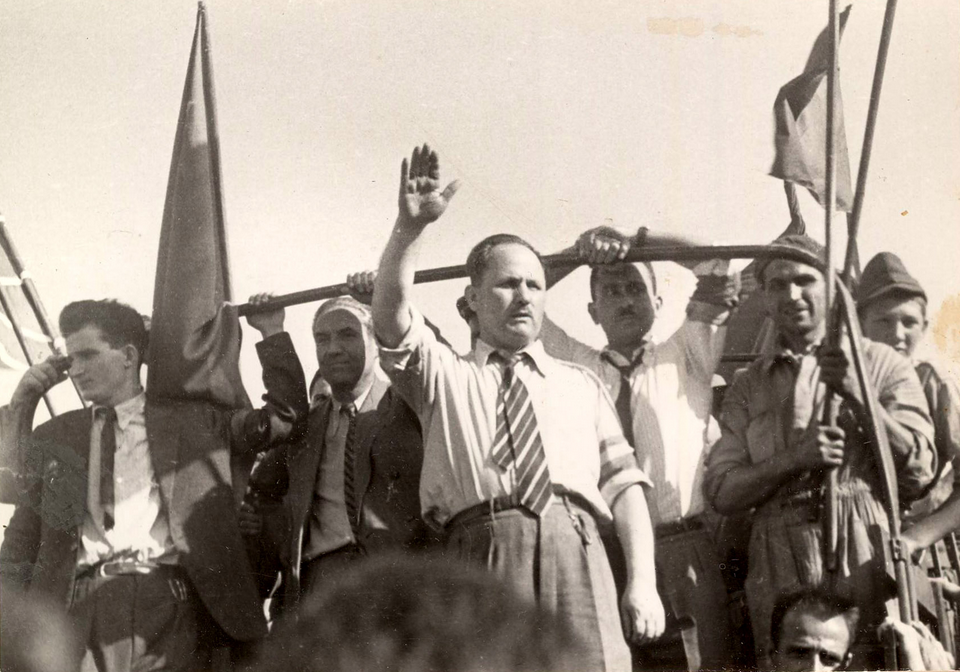
Agiu (center) together with Nicolae Ceaușescu (left) greet the Red Army entering Bucharest on August 30, 1944

Agiu served as Undersecretary of State at the Ministry of Agriculture from March 6, 1945 to April 14, 1948 in the governments headed by Petru Groza, and served as the President of the Great National Assembly from 11 June to 27 December 1948. In 1958, he joined the leadership committee of the Association of Former Inhabitants and deported anti-fascist politicians.
