= Mihail Roller =

Romanian communist activist, historian and propagandist

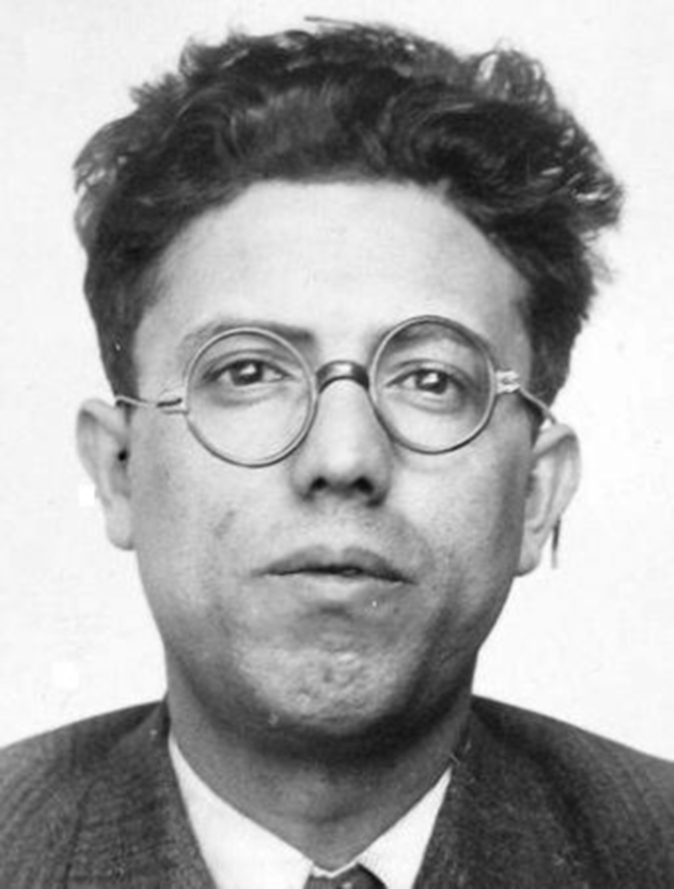
- Roller's mug shot, 1933
- Born: 6 May 1908; Buhuși, Neamț County, Kingdom of Romania
- Died: 21 June 1958 (aged 50); Bucharest, People's Republic of Romania
- Other names: Mihai Roller, Mihail Rolea, Mihail Rollea

Academic background
- Influences: Friedrich Engels, Vladimir Lenin, Karl Marx, Joseph Stalin, Andrei Zhdanov

Academic work
- Era: 20th century
- School or tradition: Marxism–Leninism, Zhdanov Doctrine
- Main interests: Marxist historiography, history of Romania, oral history
- Notable works: Pagini ignorate din istoria României moderne (1945); Pedagogia în URSS (1947); Istoria R.P.R. (1947 etc.); Anul revoluționar 1848 (1948)
- Resting place: Cenușa Crematorium, Bucharest

Mihail Roller (Romanian pronunciation: [mihaˈil ˈrolər], first name also Mihai, also known as Rolea or Rollea; 6 May 1908 – 21 June 1958) was a Romanian communist activist, historian and propagandist, who held a rigid ideological control over Romanian historiography and culture in the early years of the communist regime. During his training in engineering, he rallied with the communist cells in Romania and abroad, joining the Romanian Communist Party while it was still an underground group. He collaborated with the Agitprop leaders Leonte Răutu and Iosif Chișinevschi, spent time in prison for his communist activity, and ultimately exiled himself to the Soviet Union, where he trained in Marxist historiography.

Returning to Romania upon the close of World War II, Roller carried out communist assignments in the field of culture. Under Răutu, he helped draft the official history textbook, monopolizing the historical narrative for over a decade. Turning the focus away from nationality and on class struggle, Roller's work sought to reeducate the traditionalist public, and depicted Romania as strongly linked to Slavic Europe. In advancing such theses, Roller censored out historical events, and, in one instance, recounted events that never took place in real life.

In the later 1950s, Roller found himself shut out by his communist peers. He was branded a deviationist by the party leadership members, probably because he had unwittingly exposed their secondary roles in early communist history. Roller died in mysterious circumstances, which do not exclude the possibility of suicide.

== Biography ==
=== Early life and activity ===
Roller was born in Buhuși, then a commune in Neamț County, to a Jewish family; as reported by Roller himself, his father was a rabbi, though some sources identify him as a functionary. The boy completed his secondary education in Bacău, and soon became a sympathizer of far left causes. The date of his affiliation with the banned Romanian Communist Party (PCdR), later Workers' Party (PMR), remains disputed. The formerly communist writer Mihai Stoian gives 1926, noting that it coincided with a strike action in Buhuși. Other sources suggest that he only joined in 1931. Historian Lucian Boia writes that Roller, like other communist men of his generation, could not have been a card-carrying member at that stage, since that would have formed material proof of conspiratorial activity. More likely, Roller was inducted through a verbal statement.

A student at the Technische Hochschule in Charlottenburg (now Technische Universität Berlin) and ParisTech between 1925 and 1931, Roller became a member of the Roter Frontkämpferbund. He also joined the Communist Party of Germany in 1926 and the French Communist Party in 1928, working on their publications. According to his autobiographical notes, he also served as leader of the Romanian Communist Group in France. Professionally, he qualified as a road and highway superintendent. After returning to the country in 1931, Roller was made editor of the PCdR's main gazette, Scînteia. Roller described his beginnings with the party's Agitprop section (1931–1933) as the start of his life as a "professional revolutionary".

As later noted by researcher Victor Frunză, the PCdR's clandestine nature and inner struggles make it impossible to know for sure who was in charge of Scînteia by that moment in time. Frunză believes that Roller was one of the young men working under senior activist Ana Pauker; the others were Răutu, Chișinevschi, Vasile Luca, Gheorghe Stoica, Sorin Toma, Gheorghe Vasilichi and Ștefan Voicu. Another fellow communist, Belu Zilber, later noted that Roller was already designated the PCdR historian, and promised an official post in the event of a communist takeover. Such historiographic ambitions prompt historian Adrian Cioroianu to call Roller a "fantasizer" in the field. According to political scientist Vladimir Tismăneanu, Roller was also one of the Jewish and Bessarabian "déclassés" who gained top PCdR positions in the Chișinevschi–Răutu faction, and in fact a staunch anti-intellectual.

=== Arrests and declining health ===
Known as "engineer Roller" or "Rolea" in files kept by the Kingdom of Romania's Siguranța secret police, he first attracted the authorities' attention following the discovery of a secret printing press in Bucharest. In the early months of 1933, Roller was an ideological instructor in the Green Sector, and worked there until October, when he was arrested. Released by November, he was dispatched to his native region of Western Moldavia. Roller himself recalled having then served as regional secretary for Oltenia in March–April 1934 and July 1934–May 1935. He was again arrested in 1934 and 1938, although never sentenced due to lack of evidence. According to PCdR documents, between his arrests Roller negotiated popular front alliances with other socialist groups: in 1934, he was one of several "antifascist committee" members who carried out fusion talks with the Unitary Socialist Party (PSU) of Constantin Popovici.

Roller, who also supervised the creation of workers' antifascist sections in Bucharest in September 1934, is mentioned as one of the PCdR and PSU activists who signed a formal protest against "the numerous abusive and illegal acts perpetrated by the organs of repression". In May–October 1935, he served as chief ideological instructor for the communist party. He was them moved to another position, serving as the party secretary for the Lower Danube committee (Galați), following which he served on the Committee of Defense for Antifascist Prisoners, part of the International Red Aid (MOPR) network. In this capacity, Roller mobilized support for Pauker, at a time when she was facing trial for sedition.

His works of the time included political articles such as Fascismul și baza sa socială ("Fascism and Its Social Basis"). A Siguranța note of May 1937 mentions the publication of his first standalone brochure, titled Din istoria drepturilor omului ("From the History of the Rights of Man") and prefaced by philosopher Constantin Rădulescu-Motru. It was largely a posthumous homage to activist Constantin Costa-Foru. Police mentioned that it was already being sold in bookstores and by distributors of PCdR publications, and believed it was partly financed by the city's Baptist community, to whom a chapter was dedicated. As Roller himself explained, the brochure was meant to test the limits of Romanian censorship, and was part of his work for the MOPR. Din istoria was still found by the police to contain "extremist" passages, and only being purchased by persons "suspected of communism". Once they found that it had not been approved by the state censorship apparatus, it was banned and all copies on sale ordered confiscated. A note from that October indicates that Roller was planning a new work about the 1920 general strike, to be financed by the party. As Roller reports, the work was published, albeit "massacred by censorship", then taken out of circulation entirely. The same year, he issued another concise tract, Contribuție la istoria socială a României ("A Contribution to the Social History of Romania").

Having attended MOPR summits in Paris and Prague during 1937 and 1938, Roller served for just three days as head of the Romanian branch. In 1938, he spent a brief term at Jilava Prison. In his autobiography, Sorin Toma notes that conditions there were not as bad as at Doftana, but that 26 prisoners were given two buckets per day of drinking water and two to use as chamber pots. Roller, suffering from a chronic disease later diagnosed as diabetes insipidus, would drain one of the buckets himself and fill the other. Roller himself claimed to have spent 1938–1940 mostly in specialized hospitals, "completely inactive". His only works in agitprop were occasional articles in Scînteia and a feuilleton on labor history, taken up by Deșteptarea, the Romanian American newspaper. He finally checked himself out of hospital and resumed clandestine work against his colleagues' advice. He returned to campaigning among the workers of the Green Sector, and was also appointed co-editor of an illegal newspaper, Viața Muncitoare.

=== Soviet exile and return ===
In July 1940, Roller, having narrowly escaped re-arrest by the Romanian authorities, left for Bessarabia, which had been recently occupied by the Soviets. He was for a while at Reni, in the Ukrainian SSR. Roller subsequently moved to the Moldavian SSR, at Chișinău, where he began working for the city's Tobacco Plant. In June 1941, just days before the start of Operation Barbarossa, he sent his résumé to Boris Stefanov, asking to be considered for membership in the Communist Party of the Soviet Union. Drawn into the PCdR group in Moscow, Roller continued working under Pauker, who had also joined the Romanian exile community. He also attended the History faculty of Moscow State University. Little is known about Roller's activity in early 1944, when the change of fortunes on the Eastern Front signaled a Soviet victory over the Axis powers. Reputedly, he stopped paying his PCdR membership fee, which may indicate that he was busy with party work, and prepared for a career in communized Romania. After spending some time at Institute No. 205 (formerly a Comintern school), in December 1944 he was the only Romanian native teaching prisoners of war at Krasnogorsk's Central Antifascist School. While here, he suggested employing Alexandru Bârlădeanu and Haia Grinberg to assist him with specialized classes.

Following the coup of summer 1944, Roller, using his Soviet ideological training to his advantage, could join the party's propaganda structures. In 1945 he became deputy head of science and education at the central committee's Agitprop directorate, led by Leonte Răutu, remaining in that post until 1955. The team comprising Roller, Răutu, Chișinevschi, Toma, Nicolae Moraru and Ofelia Manole was effectively in control of the entire directorate until 1953, and helped reconfigure Romanian culture in conformity with the Zhdanov Doctrine. According to Tismăneanu, Roller had become a "scribe" of Romanian communism, one of several "fanatics" and "dilettantes" pushed up through PCdR promotions.

Mihail Roller signaled his return to Romanian historiography with the 1945 essay Pagini ignorate din istoria României moderne ("Pages Ignored from the History of Modern Romania"). It announced that the communist effort to reinterpret history had gained momentum: "The outlook of dialectical and historical materialism also arms us with the basic principles of scientific historical research." Roller went on to state that the capitalist historians had turned history into an occult science, since "it was in the interest of imperialism abroad, and of the exploiting classes within, that the history of the people and its struggles become public." This process, he proposed, was reversible.

However, political propaganda was still Roller's main task at that early a stage; for instance, he authored a series of articles in Scînteia meant to combat the National Peasants' Party prior to the 1946 election. His editorials in the communist press made successive returns into the realm of Marxist-Leninist historiography. At Contemporanul, he outlined his suggestions about changing the chronology of Romanian history, and reinterpreted seminal events, such as the 1859 union of Romania, through a Marxist lens. Other such texts helped enshrine the myth of "illegalists" (clandestine communists of the 1930s and '40s) as freedom fighters. Also then, Frunză notes, Roller took part in the semi-compulsory Russification campaign, launching the agitprop slogan Să învățăm limba lui Lenin și Stalin! ("Let's learn the language of Lenin and Stalin!"). The pro-Soviet enterprise Editura Cartea Rusă published his tract Pedagogia în URSS ("Pedagogy in the USSR"), recommending the imitation of Soviet schooling.

By the summer of 1947, Roller's other party work involved exercising direct communist control over a left-wing student movement (the Democratic University Front) and instigating a purge of the "reactionary" professors. Reputedly, Roller is also responsible for the refusal to accept a gift of Constantin Brâncuși's modernist sculptures, thus depriving the Romanian state of a major art collection. He also made a controversial contribution to the field of communist censorship, joining up with Chișinevschi in the task of supervising Romanian cinema.

In November 1948, following the establishment of a Communist regime, he was elected to the Romanian Academy subsequent to the purge of a large number of members. Roller was part of a wave of new academicians; as noted by various authors, most of these were of peripheral importance in their fields, but were staunch adherents of communism and ready to act as ideological enforcers. Elected the Academy's Vice President (seconding Traian Săvulescu), he also headed the Section for History, Philosophy, Economics and Law from 1949 to 1955. Roller believed the academy should shift from its former position of "a feudal caste, a closed circle, isolated from the masses and the people's needs" into "a living and active factor in the development of our science and culture". Moreover, he exhorted members, regardless of their specialty, to apply Marxist-Leninist teaching on society and its development, proletarian revolutions, the building of socialism and the victory of communism.

By March 1952, Roller was directly involved in vetting new members of the Academy, personally handling the reception of Matei Socor and the promotion of Ștefan Vencov. As he reported to Soviet diplomat Golichenkov, the reshuffling could ensure that Roller was "no longer alone among old reactionaries" such as Săvulescu (although he still approved induction for the latter's wife, Alice Aronescu-Săvulescu). When Săvulescu suggested that Academy publications should go uncensored, Roller intervened and reimposed "control", noting: "I am here to supervise and cut out those bits that catch my eye." Even the more traditionalist members of the communist academic establishment were irritated by Roller's interventions. Scholar Mihai Ralea allegedly called him "an incompetent, evil rube".

=== Early program ===
Reviewing the impact of such directives, Lucian Boia calls Roller "the little dictator" of Romanian historiography, unchallenged after the "earthquake" of 1948 had invented a Romanian Marxist tradition. From 1948 to 1955, Roller was professor as well as chairman of the Romanian History department at the Political Military Academy. In 1948, he published his own synthesis on the Revolutions of 1848 among the Romanians: Anul revoluționar 1848 ("1848, the Revolutionary Year"). That historical period was to be the main focus of his articles and exposes, well into the 1950s. Roller was also a "historical reviewer" for a propaganda film retelling the 1848 events, with Geo Bogza as the screenwriter.

Following the 1948 election, Roller became a member of the Great National Assembly. In April 1949, he and Răutu were delegates to the Congress of Advocates of Peace under Mihail Sadoveanu (who reputedly eclipsed them both). That year, Roller rose to head the Agitprop section's education committee. This body was charged with writing school textbooks for use throughout the educational system, most of them translated from Russian. Under his direct tutelage, primary school pupils began learning about the "new teachers of the working class" (Marx, Engels, Lenin and Stalin), while Russian-language education began in 4th grade and continued through the third year of university.

As a means of solidifying his control over Romanian historiography, Roller promoted his supporters at the academy's history institutes, especially the Bucharest branch, headed from 1953 by Victor Cheresteșiu and his deputy Aurel Roman. He was himself supported by a number of young researchers whom he had promoted and sent to study in the Soviet Union. He focused keenly on introducing ideology into higher education and party control over universities, and his general duties included supervision over science as a whole, not only history. His functions and execution of party orders meant that Roller essentially controlled all the historiography produced between 1948 and 1955. His words indicated the limits within which historians could practice their craft. In the view of historian Liviu Pleșa, Roller's activities sought to "uproot traditional values from the Romanian mindset" and replace them with the new regime's propagandistic themes.

The Roller directives are infamous for emphasizing the supposed grandeur of the Soviet Union under Stalin, but also for praising Tsarist Russia and the Slavic peoples. The other ideas emphasized included the condemnation of other foreigners, particularly Westerners, starting with Ancient Rome—the French, Italian and American libraries were shut down, their patrons arrested; condemnation of the formerly dominant boyars ("traitors" to the Ottomans) and bourgeoisie ("cosmopolitan" and "serving imperialist capitalists"); and minimization of the role played by historic Romanian figures. Described by traditionalist historians as Romania's war of national unity, World War I was treated by Roller and other Marxist-Leninists as an "imperialist war". Romania's participation was therefore an "imperialist action", as were the occupation of Bessarabia and the intervention in Hungary.

The official view of Romanian history that these ideas represented was developed by Agitprop activists and the PMR's own History Institute, later becoming dogma when approved by party plenaries and congresses. Authoritative texts included the writings of Stalin, the "Short Course" History of the Soviet Communist Party, the decisions of the PMR's central committee and the writings and speeches of Gheorghiu-Dej. In the early years of the regime, scholars often imbued their work with an ideological tint by quoting Stalin or, to a lesser degree, Lenin. Taking their cue from a 1946 speech by Andrei Zhdanov, Răutu and Roller sought to replace the "bourgeois-reactionary" and "anti-Romanian" old historiography with dialectical materialism; the latter warned that failure to write a new history "would have left in the hands of the class enemy an ideological weapon against the working class".

=== Istoria R.P.R. ===
His history textbook, the first Marxist synthesis of Romanian history, appeared in 1947, in one edition for advanced pupils and another for younger ones. It portrayed the country's history through the lens of Marxist stages of history: primitive communism, slavery, feudalism, capitalism and socialism, advancing all the while through class struggle. Initially called Istoria României ("The History of Romania") but later Istoria R.P.R. ("The History of the Romanian People's Republic"), it appeared between 1947 and 1956 and was used until the 1961–1962 school year. Appearing very quickly ("in record time", according to Stoian), it was not written from scratch by Roller and his collaborators, but rather used documents from the PCR's period of illegality, especially the theses adopted by the fifth party congress held near Moscow in 1931. These criticized the 1859 union, the 1918 union, the constitutional government, democratic reforms, the monarchy, parliamentarism, the activity of the historic parties' leaders and foreign policy, with all these criticisms entering the textbook.

Istoria R.P.R. earned its author the Romanian State Prize for 1949, while Agitprop presented it as a huge success. Its claims (instantly sold-out editions, millions of copies in circulation) were in fact irrelevant, as there was no actual competition in the field. The only history textbook allowed in schools, it has been described by Șerban Papacostea as "the vastest work of political mystification of Romania's past", making Roller "a symbol of the effort to adapt the Romanian past to the imperatives of the Soviet occupation and the 'internationalist' regime" imposed on the country. Boia also notes that, especially after adopting an acronym in its title, Istoria... overturned the logic of previous historiographic discourse, from the "national idea" to "the internationalist spirit". Stoian additionally suggests that Istoria... is a failure from a literary point of view. It is written in "wooden tongue" and its phrases have "the taste of sud".

The textbook's political ideas became historiographic theses and quickly turned into requirements for all the official history writing of the period. Class struggle was presented as the driving force of history, with social conflicts taken out of context and exaggerated in importance. A special case is the ancient history chapter, on Roman Dacia. There, commentators note, Roller veers into pseudohistory, creating a narrative about social revolts among the Dacians, none of which actually occurred. Historic figures were relegated to the exploitative classes, the suppression of these classes by the dictatorship of the proletariat being justified by their centuries of misdeeds. The Soviet Union was lavished with praise, the contributions of Slavs in Romanian history being highlighted, from the migratory period to the medieval period, to the War of Independence and the present. The very origin of the Romanians was narrated differently than before: Roller himself concluded that the influence of Slavic polities—Danube Bulgaria, Kievan Rus', Halych—was fundamental in shaping the lives of early Romanians. Classical Western values were attacked, more violently in later editions as the Cold War deepened.

The iconography of national awakening was consciously modified. Michael the Brave, previously depicted as a national unifier, was presented as a tool of Holy Roman Emperor Rudolf II. The Transylvanian School was renamed the "Latinist School", its leaders accused of hiding Slavic and Russian influence on Romanians and of promoting chauvinism. The 1848 rebellions, and in particular the successful Wallachian Revolution, were described as precursors of Marxism-Leninism. Of the leaders, only Nicolae Bălcescu was appreciated for combating feudalism and siding with Tsarist Russia; at the other end, Avram Iancu was chided for collaborating with the Austrian Empire. Roller's views of Bălcescu were almost entirely positive, and developed into a communist personality cult: counterfactually, Roller described Bălcescu's left-liberalism as a highly advanced form of utopian socialism and proto-Marxism. The 1859 union of the principalities only benefited the bourgeoisie by expanding the market for their products, and favored their class only, rather than the masses and the nation as a whole. Alexandru Ioan Cuza, who ruled over the unified state, was criticized as a hesitant reformer.

The creation of Greater Romania in 1918 was viewed, as regards the absorption of Bessarabia, as an "imperialist intervention against the socialist revolution in Russia". Likewise, the union of Transylvania, was an "intervention against the revolution in Hungary". The modern era was considered to have begun not with the union of 1918 but with the Great October Socialist Revolution of 1917; the Paleolithic became "wild man" and the Neolithic, "barbarism". Communist strikes and demonstrations during the interwar period were detailed and blown out of proportion, so that the 1917–1948 period was viewed mainly through the lens of PCdR history. Official history was laicized by greatly de-emphasizing the role of the Romanian Orthodox Church. Recent history presented in a negative light the political parties, the monarchy (according to Roller, "the most reactionary exemplar of its political class and the greatest owner of latifundia"), the democratic regime and its institutions. The interwar chapter was headlined "The Increase in Romania's Enslavement to American, English and French Imperialism", with "only words of scorn" reserved for the Brătianu family.

In this way, the class struggle and especially repression against the upper classes were legitimized: if the latter had stood against the masses for centuries, then taking away their properties through nationalization and incarcerating them seemed just. The events near the end of World War II were depicted as follows: the King Michael Coup was a "liberation by the Soviet Army" defending the country from imperialists; Northern Transylvania was restored thanks to the Soviets; the SovRoms aided in the country's economic recovery; the clauses favorable to Romania in the Paris Peace Treaties were due to the Soviets, while punitive ones originated with the imperialists. According to Stoian, the political history sections was largely reliant on fabricated and backdated documents, and justified the PCdR/PMR repression of its enemies, including the "right-wing social democrats" and the Zionists. Lucrețiu Pătrășcanu, who had endorsed national communism against his pro-Soviet colleagues and had been executed for it, was retrospectively defined as a "traitor" and "carrier of the bourgeois ideology".

Criticism from Romanian and especially Soviet historians, acting on instructions from the Kremlin, found the text insufficiently Marxist-Leninist. In 1950, one Soviet took issue with the way the Transylvanian School was presented, considering that its Latinist orientation made it a "vassal of the Papacy" and charging it with chauvinism against Slavs and Hungarians. A Soviet delegation that visited Romania in 1949 ended by criticizing a number of elements in Roller's text.

=== Documentary, writing and enforcement activities ===
At Roller's initiative, a vast number of historic documents were published. However, these were carefully selected to conform to the party's vision, particularly in volumes on the War of Independence and on the 1907 Romanian Peasants' Revolt. For the first, documents casting Russia in an unfavorable light were removed, while for the second, documents not advancing the regime's desire to show the "savage repression of the bourgeois-landowning governments" were not published. Other collections were similarly doctored. For his work on the volume dealing with the peasants' revolt, Roller was again awarded the State Prize, first class, in 1951. Pleșa does give credit to Roller for ordering publication of documents from the country's medieval period, previously missing from print nearly in their entirety, and of an index to the Hurmuzachi collection that had become virtually unusable. Although professional historians worked on these projects, he also notes that Roller did not consent to have the documents published in their original form, especially due to the exigencies of working at a Stakhanovite pace, and that the finished products did not reach a very high standard.

He helped plan the Romanian-Russian Museum in Bucharest and the Maxim Gorky Institute of Higher Education, devoted to training teachers of Russian language and literature. The magazine of which he was editor-in-chief, Studii ("Studies"), first appeared in 1948. This was quarterly until 1955, then bimonthly until 1974, when it became monthly and its name was changed to Revista de Istorie. At the same time, magazines on a similar theme were shuttered: Revista Istorică, founded by Nicolae Iorga, Constantin C. Giurescu's Revista Istorică Română, Victor Papacostea's Balcanica and Revue des Études Sud-Est Européennes.

A frequent target of Roller's many articles in Scînteia, Lupta de Clasă and Studii was the pre-communist historiography, which he accused of falsifying the role of the working class and of the masses more broadly. He reiterated that pre-communist historians served the "bourgeois-landowning" regimes dominated by "foreign imperialists", who wished the Romanian people to remain ignorant of their history so they could more easily be exploited. The rise of Roller coincided with a concerted effort by the new regime to wipe away traces of previous writers, so that works by historians including Giurescu, Victor Papacostea and Nicolae Benescu were eliminated from the curriculum, while some historians, such as Gheorghe Brătianu and Ion Nistor died in prison, their works hidden from public view.

Roller also saw enemies among the ranks of older teachers he believed blocked the "cultural revolution", and promoted "re-education of the teaching staff". He sought to imbue the educational system with a class character and make it serve the interests of workers, peasants and "progressive intellectuals", including those who had rushed to the new regime's side. Already in 1947, students were encouraged to form Marxist "cells", verifying the dogmatic purity of history lessons, and holding the teachers accountable. In one instance, Roller explained that, as long as the old teaching staff could include a "war criminal" such as Ion Petrovici, his own colleagues, Răutu and Chișinevschi, were fit to lecture in Marxism-Leninism at the University of Bucharest. He continued to have a plenary take on education, and insisted that music should form part of schooling. Unintentionally, his position on the subject allowed educators and students to evade politicization for at least part of the school week.

At times, Roller intervened on behalf of certain historians the regime considered undesirable, including the medievalist P. P. Panaitescu. When the Securitate secret police, charging past membership in the Iron Guard, arrested archaeologist Vladimir Dumitrescu while he was excavating at Hăbășești, Roller intervened several times with the police leadership, in particular Alexandru Drăghici and Gheorghe Pintilie, until his release was ultimately obtained. Other historians, after their release from prison, also asked Roller for help to start working again.

=== Impact on archaeology ===
One particular area into which Roller injected communist ideology was Romanian archaeology. He shifted the emphasis from Roman Dacia to pre- and post-Roman periods, reflecting Marx' and Engels' view of the Roman Empire as supremely exploitative. He also adapted Stalin's remarks on the "unscientific position of old bourgeois historians" whose study of Russia reportedly began with Kievan Rus' and ignored what came before. In a Romanian context, this meant reversing the "denial of the development of human society prior to Dacia's conquest" by previous historians. He also emphasized Gheorghiu-Dej's position that Romanian territory had for over a millennium been robbed by Romans and barbarians, just as it had been by French, British or German imperialists.

In 1950, in an article on excavations made the previous year, he criticized Emil Condurachi, who had explored Histria, for not studying the native population before the "exploitative" Romans, urging a focus on the battles between Dacians and unconquered peoples against the Romans. He took issue with Ion Nestor for refusing to claim the presence of slaves at Monteoru: "some are afraid to place themselves on the proletariat's class position". Along with Radu Vulpe, he was berating for issuing field reports that were purely technical rather than ideologically shaded, concluding that "they do not seek to shed light, using scientific concepts, on the problems of the ancient history of the Romanian People's Republic". Condurachi was singled out for not using his report to attack Scarlat Lambrino, the previous head excavator at Histria, who as an exile in the West was "a sellout to Anglo-American imperialism". Roller's ideas on class struggle in Roman Dacia imposed the term "free Dacians" into the archaeological nomenclature. The name implicitly distinguished between Dacians in Roman territory, who were "unfree", and those roaming further east.

Roller instructed that "we must mercilessly unmask the enemies of science and the lackeys of the former bourgeois-landowning regime". Nevertheless, archaeology did become a more ordered field, in contrast to the individual and sporadic efforts that came before. A team of specialists would excavate a site thoroughly, and the regime lavished funds on such studies. Emphasis was laid on finding traces of Slavic settlement, so that this people could be shown to have had an important role in the development of Romanian society.

=== Fall from grace ===
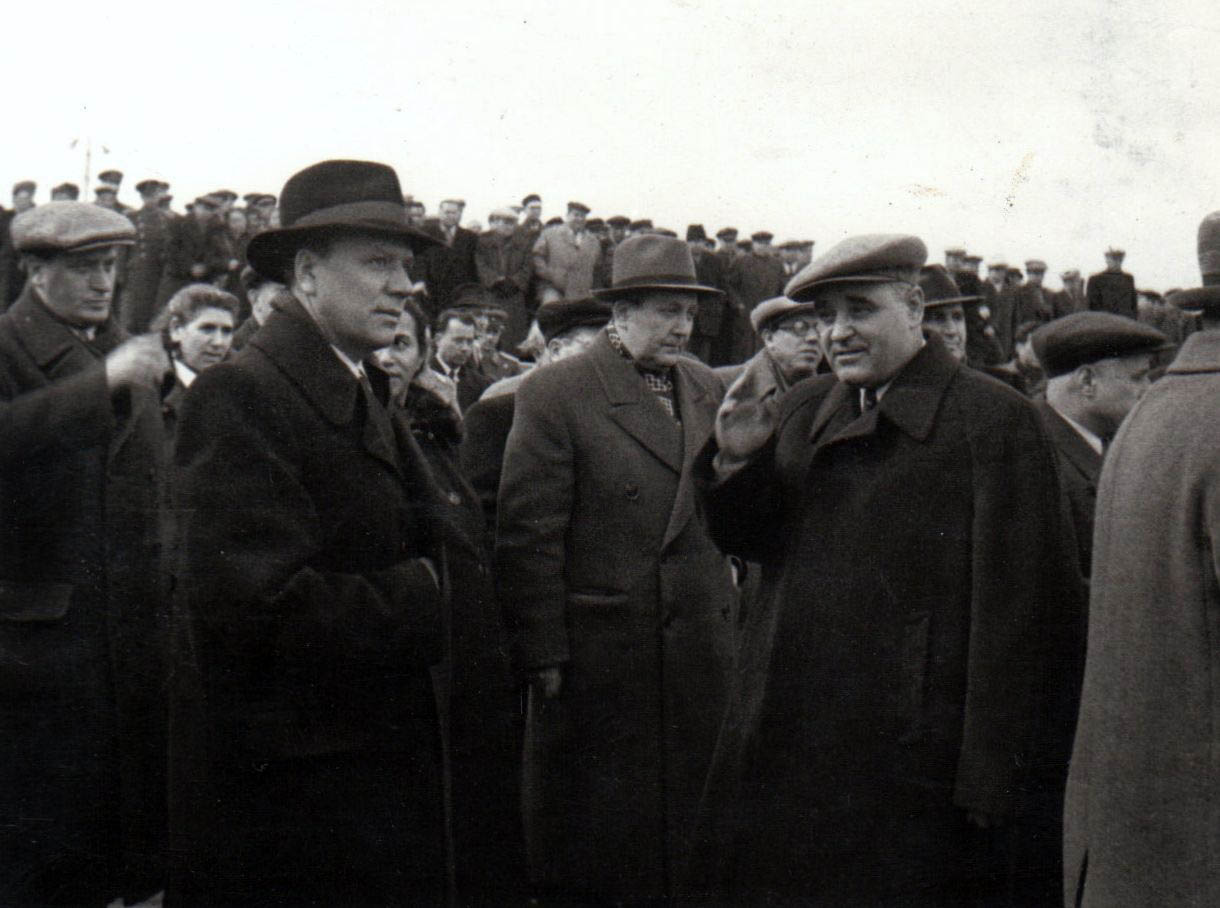
Roller (second row, in glasses) at Băneasa Airport in March 1953, greeting Gheorghiu-Dej upon his return from Stalin's funeral

In the mid-1950s, Roller's position started losing ground. The death of Stalin and the Khrushchev Thaw had echoes within Romania: the country's leader, Gheorghe Gheorghiu-Dej, with an eye to United Nations membership, relaxed repressive measures. Collectivization and industrialization were slowed down, certain political prisoners were freed, and the new climate had its effect on the cultural realm as well. Among the prisoners released were intellectuals who were gradually brought back into universities and research institutes. In 1955, a party science and culture section was established, headed by Pavel Țugui and meant to counteract the grip on culture held by the Răutu–Roller Agitprop section. Gheorghiu-Dej spoke out against the "monopoly and dictate of Roller", especially on history but also on culture in general, and blamed the two for the crisis in the field and the party's poor relationship with intellectuals.

Țugui, by explaining Roller's errors, managed to attract Gheorghe Apostol and Nicolae Ceaușescu as supporters. He also drew to his side the Romanian Academy members Constantin Daicoviciu, David Prodan and Andrei Oțetea, as well as education minister Ilie Murgulescu, and later some of Roller's former collaborators, including Vasile Maciu, Victor Cheresteșiu and Barbu Câmpina. In early 1956, Oțetea, Daicoviciu and Câmpina sent Gheorghiu-Dej a document accusing Roller and close collaborators of plagiarism and unscientific scholarship. One effect of the moves against Roller was the 1955 firing of Aurel Roman as editor of Studii and his replacement with Oțetea (who the following year also replaced Cheresteșiu as head of the Bucharest History Institute), so that articles started to appear without Roller's approval. In 1955, he also lost his position at the Agitprop section and was transferred to become deputy director of the PMR History Institute, wielding more power than the titular head, Constantin Pîrvulescu. Also then, the regime was trying to coax Aurel Decei, a professional historian who had fled to Ankara, into returning and assuming a leadership position in academia. The task of negotiating with Decei fell on diplomat Gheorghe Pele, who noted: "Yes, we have gad this historian fella, a professor, this kike Roller, who has been falsifying history these past years [....]. They're just now getting rid of him."

By then, Roller was directing the effort to preserve samples of oral history, interviewing the former "illegalists" and building up a large collection of magnetic tape recordings. Reputedly, Roller's experiment in oral history had unwittingly managed to embarrass the communist leader: it presented Gheorghiu-Dej as more the secondary figure than the "illegalist" leader fashioned in official documents. In the spring of 1958, as the party celebrated 25 years since the Grivița Strike of 1933, the PMR Institute collection of recordings was in focus. A number of the "illegalists", especially those who did not receive the posts they expected after 1944, began to question whether Gheorghiu-Dej had played the leading role he claimed for himself during the strike, as well as criticizing the country's direction. The latter hastily called a plenary session of the central committee for 9–13 June, where a group of deviationists was "unmasked". The group was entirely composed of members who had belonged to the party when it was banned and included prominent figures such as Constantin Doncea and Grigore Răceanu. Officially, they were sanctioned for criticizing the leadership and its work methods as well as for attempting to organize a conference where party activity would be discussed. The underlying motive for the purge was their criticism of the party's stifling atmosphere and of the personality cult surrounding Gheorghiu-Dej.

The plenary session also criticized Roller, and afterwards, Paul Niculescu-Mizil presented the party leadership a report recommending that the entire leadership of the PMR Institute save the director be removed. At the same time as the plenary, a joint meeting of Romanian and Soviet historians took place at which Oțetea sharply criticized Roller for the unprofessionalism with which he published documents and announced they would be republished. The Soviets did not defend Roller, which the latter interpreted as a loss of support from his former allies.

=== Death and legacy ===
Roller died on 21 June 1958, and Pleșa believes he most likely committed suicide. Tismăneanu initially credited that rumor in his Radio Free Europe addresses, but later noted that the suicide story was "unconfirmed". According to at least two accounts, Roller had also suffered a stroke or a heart attack some time during the "unmasking" sessions. He died without heirs. He had married Sara Zighelboim, whose brothers Avram and Ștrul were communist activists during the 1930s. She was originally from Bessarabia, and had returned there in 1940, shortly before Roller himself. Their daughter Sonela died in 1956 while with her father at a health resort: after diving into a pool, she suffered a fatal head trauma.

An urn containing Roller's ashes is housed at the Cenușa Crematorium in Bucharest. Although sidelined by the time of his death, he received the usual PMR honor, an obituary piece in Scînteia. Anticommunist intellectual G. T. Kirileanu recorded in his diary on 22 June that Roller had "done much harm to Romanian culture." Kirileanu accentuated the Jewish component of Roller's identity, referring to him as a "rabbi's son", and arguing that, through him, "Jews impose[d] their point on view on the evolution of Romanian spirituality." Roller's death did not result in a thorough change to the historiographical ideas he had put forth. Class struggle and dialectical materialism continued to be taught in schools. While history writing did alter after 1960, with less emphasis placed on the "greatness" of the Soviet Union and on criticizing the West, and greater attention paid to previously neglected historical figures, this was due not so much to Roller's disappearance from the scene as to Romania's changed international position and gradual alienation from the Soviets. The role of guiding communist historiography fell on Marxists from the professional field, primarily Oțetea.

Tismăneanu and historian Cristian Vasile note that Roller's downfall was a sacrificial offering by Leonte Răutu, who survived the "unmasking" period and was still a culture boss under the national communism of the 1960s. Gheorghiu-Dej's successor Ceaușescu allowed young authors—Ileana Vrancea, Ion Cristoiu—or senior figures—Iorgu Iordan—, to publish works critical of the Zhdanov Doctrine. Although these mentioned Roller by name, Răutu was entirely exempt. Iordan calls Roller the "evil genie" of the Romanian Academy, and makes him responsible for the more "fanatical" decisions—such as granting posthumous Academy membership to the Marxist poet Dumitru Theodor Neculuță. A bizarre exception to this rule was an official reference work, the 1978 Enciclopedia istoriografiei românești ("The Encyclopedia of Romanian Historiography"). It has an entry on Roller, which does not feature any negative commentary, while Răutu is entirely absent.

Roller's contribution was reevaluated again after the Romanian Revolution of 1989 toppled communism. Some of the first monographs dealing with Roller's career and its impact on Romania were published by Romulus Rusan, the Civic Alliance Foundation, and the Sighet Memorial of the Victims of Communism. Writing in 1999, Mihai Stoian described it as anomalous that, in the process of restoring membership to those deposed by the regime, the Academy had not also posthumously stripped Roller of his title. He calls Roller "a red specter", haunting "the bookcases dusted by lies and servitude." Senior historian Florin Constantiniu reflected back on the communist period, coining the popular (but, according to Cristian Vasile, melodramatic) image of Roller as "the gravedigger of authentic Romanian culture". At that stage, some authors described Roller's influence as criminal, and declared him an anti-Romanian by conviction. The books of antisemitic conspiracy theorist Iosif Constantin Drăgan cited Roller's case as evidence that Jewish communism was working against the Romanians. Despite such widespread condemnation of his theories, Roller's terminology was not entirely expunged from later Romanian research works. As noted in 1998 by archaeologist Petre Diaconu, the "meaningless and pernicious" concept of "free Dacians" has been taken for granted by numerous scientists in the field.
