= 1987 Romanian local elections =

Local elections were held in the Socialist Republic of Romania on 15 November 1987. The Brașov Rebellion also erupted on that same date.

A mandate represented two and a half years, according to the 1965 Constitution of Romania. The next local elections were going to be held on 11 March 1990, but in December 1989 local organs of the National Salvation Front (FSN) seized power from the communist authorities, of which many of their former high-ranking members were previously part of or were closely associated with up to a certain point in time (e.g. Ion Iliescu, Alexandru Bârlădeanu, Silviu Brucan, etc.).
