= Silviu Brucan =

Romanian politician

Director of the Romanian Radio Broadcasting Company
- In office 1962–1966

Romaniam Ambassador to the United States
- In office 9 April 1956 – 12 August 1959
- Preceded by: Anton Moisescu
- Succeeded by: George Macovescu

Romanian Ambassador to the United Nations
- In office 1959–1961
- Preceded by: Mihai Magheru
- Succeeded by: Mihai Haseganu

Personal details
- Born: 18 January 1916 Bucharest, Kingdom of Romania
- Died: 14 September 2006 (aged 90)
- Citizenship: Romania
- Party: PCR
- Spouse: Alexandra Sidorovici
- Education: Saint Sava National College
- Occupation: Journalist, linguist, diplomat, politician

Silviu Brucan (18 January 1916 – 14 September 2006) was a Romanian communist politician. He became a critic of the dictatorship of Nicolae Ceaușescu. After the Romanian Revolution, Brucan became a political analyst.

== Early life ==
He was born in Bucharest to wealthy Jewish parents living in Berzei Street, near Matache Măcelaru Market. His father was a wholesale wool merchant who imported fabrics from England in the aftermath of World War I, suits of fine English fabrics being a luxury item that was popular among the Romanian bourgeoisie that was rising in the wake of an economic boom. He attended the German-language Evangelische Schule of Luterană Street and the Saint Sava National College.

In 1929 came the Wall Street Crash, leading to the Great Depression and a slump in the luxury industry, including English clothes. As a result, Brucan's father's shop in Șepcari Street went bankrupt, and the Brucan family was left penniless. They moved into a modest apartment on Vlad Țepeș Street. Brucan's father found a job as a fabric expert working for a German merchant, but as that was not enough to feed a family of six, Silviu Brucan began giving private lessons to pupils of wealthy families, thus gaining access to the world of the rich landowners and industrialists. In his memories, Brucan said that the sharp contrast between the world of luxury of the privileged classes and the misery of those who worked hard all day to earn a living and the feeling of social injustice strongly influenced him.

As a social outcast (his father had been indicted for fraudulent bankruptcy) and as a Jew in the 1930s, he was prevented by the Iron Guard supporters from formally studying at the University of Bucharest. Nevertheless, with the help of some friends, he attended some courses at the university, such as the lectures of historian Nicolae Iorga, the philosopher Constantin Rădulescu-Motru, the aesthetician Tudor Vianu, and the philosopher Nae Ionescu.

== Early activism ==
Brucan joined the left-wing movement at the age of 18. He was attracted by the opinions found in leftist and antifascist weekly newspapers such as Stînga (The Left), Era Nouă (New Era) and Cuvîntul Liber (Free Word). Brucan joined communist groups, which organized "cultural evenings" at the houses of some supporters. There, he met literate communist supporters such as Alexandru Sahia. He began reading Marxist literature and soon was co-opted into party operations, being asked to hide some illegal party documents (speeches at a Comintern meeting in Prague) at his home.

In 1935, the moderate left-wing Dimineața newspaper was competing against Universul, a nationalist right-wing newspaper. To eliminate his rival, the owner of Universul, Stelian Popescu, began an anti-Semitic campaign (the owners of Dimineața were Jews) leading to fascists burning copies of the newspaper and associated posters. The communist and socialist youth organized vigilante groups to defend the newsstands. In his memoirs, Brucan stated that he was part of one of the left-wing groups defending the newsstands at Gara de Nord, and was involved in a fight with Iron Guard supporters, sustaining a severe head injury.

He subsequently worked as a journalist, first writing a fashionable social column at Gazeta de seară, then working as a proofreader at Adevărul Literar Brucan met Aurel Alicu, a leader of the National Peasant Youth, with whom he started in 1937 a weekly called Dacia Nouă, having writers from both the traditional parties (National Liberal and National Peasants Party) and from left-wing circles (Miron Constantinescu, Corneliu Mănescu, Roman Moldovan, and Victor Iliu). The newspaper was published for a year until the Octavian Goga government shut it down.

In late 1938, he was conscripted, serving at a border guard unit at the frontier with Bulgaria, where he was acquainted with both komitadji extremists who attacked Romanian outposts, the Aromanian colonists in Southern Dobruja, and the Middle Eastern smugglers who illegally crossed the border with hashish or opium.

During World War II, Brucan lived in the attic of a house in a quiet area in Cotroceni, working as an illegal press worker for the Communist Party's newspaper Scînteia. In 1943, he was arrested by a police agent who accidentally noticed him on Buzești Street, recalling his face from a photograph of a fellow Communist who had been previously arrested. However, as the police could not find any incriminating evidence, he was released a few days later.

== After the 23 August 1944 coup ==
In September 1944, upon Romania's exit from the Axis camp and the onset of Soviet occupation, he was named the general secretary of Scînteia (the deputy editor in chief to Leonte Răutu), the official newspaper of the Communist Party.

As long as the other newspapers still were published, Scînteia competed with them for the readers and Brucan, with the rest of the editors, tried to make a professional newspaper. However, Brucan recounts that as party newspapers and independent newspapers were forcibly closed, one by one, by the new communist authorities, the Scînteia journalists became office clerks working 9 to 5 and writing ideological editorials for the indoctrination of the workers, who were "full of hope for a glorious future".

As editor of Scînteia, he supported the prison sentences of Iuliu Maniu, Gheorghe I. Brătianu, and Corneliu Coposu (see Tămădău Affair). He also supported the repression of anti-communist journalists, such as Radu Gyr and Pamfil Șeicaru, asking for the death penalty for the latter.

During this period, Brucan's wife, the Stalinist Alexandra Sidorovici (with whom he had three children: daughter Anca, and sons Dinu and Vlad), became a public prosecutor of the Romanian People's Tribunals, which allowed her to ask for death sentences for many war criminals; the sister of Teofil Sidorovici, she was a member of the nomenklatura of the Communist government.

For a short while (1948–1949), Brucan was Professor of Journalism at the University of Bucharest, although he never graduated from college.

A close collaborator of Communist leader Gheorghe Gheorghiu-Dej, Brucan, along with Sorin Toma and Mihail Roller, was among the prominent party ideologues of the group that was co-ordinated by Leonte Răutu after the late 1940s and into the 1950s.

== Ambassador to the United States ==
A loyal Soviet agent, Brucan was ambassador of Romania to the United States in 1955. He used the experience as the basis of a book that he co-authored with Sidorovici (a virulent attack on American institutions). He was the Permanent Representative of Romania to the United Nations between 1959 and 1962 as well as the head of Televiziunea Română.

== Conflict with Ceaușescu ==
According to his declarations after the fall of Ceaușescu, Brucan became an opponent of the new leadership around Ceaușescu progressively from the 1960s. Initially, upon news that Ceaușescu had been appointed general secretary, he reportedly considered renouncing his political career to focus on an office at the university, but he was persuaded by Emil Bodnăraș to remain an activist. He was a professor of Scientific Socialism at the Bucharest Faculty of Medicine. According to Brucan himself, he faced a period of financial insecurity and began work as a translator to cover his expenses. He also sent several works, subject to censorship at home, to be published in the United States. They showed his move towards reformism that he advocated to be applied inside the Eastern Bloc.

In 1987, after sending an anti-Ceaușescu declaration to the foreign press (to the BBC, the International Herald Tribune, and United Press International), a relatively mild criticism for the violent repression of the Braşov Rebellion, he was sentenced to house arrest. At the time, Brucan had won the approval of Soviet authorities, which had already engaged in Perestroika policies and had been extended informal protection by the Soviet embassy in Bucharest, allowing him a relevant degree of freedom.

With the help from Iulian Vlad, the chief of the Securitate, he was issued a passport, and in 1988, despite being expelled from the party, he spent six months in the United States, where he was in contact with the United States Department of State, headed by George P. Shultz. Brucan also claimed to have been invited to Moscow by Soviet politicians Mikhail Gorbachev and Anatoly Dobrynin, who endorsed criticism of Ceaușescu and a Romanian version of Glasnost. Based on the personal testimonies of Gorbachev's adviser, scholar Vladimir Tismăneanu has disputed all of Brucan's account.

The fact that Ceaușescu allowed Brucan freedom of movement shows that Ceaușescu was not subjecting him to the same restrictions as to common dissidents, especially because of the interest about the safety of Brucan by both the Soviet Union (by making sure that the Pravda correspondent in Bucharest would keep close contact with him) and the governments of Great Britain and the United States by inviting him as a special guest in their countries.

== Letter of the Six ==
In March 1989, together with five other Communist dignitaries (Gheorghe Apostol, Alexandru Bârlădeanu, Grigore Răceanu, Corneliu Mănescu and Constantin Pîrvulescu), he signed the open letter known as Scrisoarea celor șase("The Letter of the Six").

The document, which was immediately broadcast on Radio Free Europe and Voice of America, was a left-wing critique of Ceauşescu's policies, and it led to the swift arrest and interrogation of the signatories by the Securitate and then to their exile and house arrest at various locations. The Securitate depicted Brucan as one of several "hostile, inveterate elements" and "the agent of foreign imperialist secret services". Although lacking in actual popular support, the letter was argued to be among the most important and influential acts of opposition and a notorious break with the traditions of strict obedience and party discipline.

Brucan was sent to a location on the outskirts of Bucharest, in Dămăroaia, the reason for his subsequent colloquial moniker, "The Oracle of Dămăroaia". Despite increased pressure, most of the contributors to the protest refused to withdraw their statement. Brucan later accused Apostol of having given in to pressures.

== During and after the Revolution ==
Brucan was part of the National Salvation Front (FSN) during the Romanian Revolution, joining its Provisional Council and its executive committee. As a member of the council, he was also involved in selecting Roman for the office of Premier.

He was a member of the council (together with Ion Iliescu, Petre Roman and some generals, including Nicolae Militaru) who decided to put the Ceaușescu couple on trial at the site in which they were being held in Târgoviște. That was due to the fear that Securitate snipers might attack the barracks and free them. According to the testimony of Petre Roman, Brucan was among those who insisted for Nicolae and Elena Ceauşescu to be executed immediately after the trial, a claim that was denied by Brucan.

When it was decided that the 10-point programme be read on national television on 22 December, according to Dumitru Mazilu, Brucan wanted it to include a clause that Romania would honour its obligations under the Soviet-controlled Warsaw Pact.

In early January, Brucan made an assurance that the FSN had no intention of turning into a political party but would support some candidates. However, only three weeks later, he supported the transformation of the FSN into a political party, arguing that otherwise, there would be a "political vacuum" that the new political parties would be unable to fill.

After public allegations, Brucan resigned from the FSN in February 1990, claiming that he had accomplished his mission to restore stability in Romania and to put the country on a course toward multi-party elections. His prediction that the FSN would win the elections by more than 90%, supported the already-wide suspicions of falsified ballots.

Early that year, he had been the host of investor George Soros at the Group for Social Dialogue, a Romanian NGO that had been formed around the intellectual élite of the previous regime.

He did not wish to run in the 1990 elections but to be "just the adviser" of now-President Iliescu. Nevertheless, he later issued a vocal criticism of President Iliescu.

In 1990, Brucan contended that Romanians would need 20 years to become accustomed to democracy. That claim became well known in Romania.

On the eve of the day of the first free post-communist elections (20 May 1990), Brucan argued that the 1989 Revolution was not anticommunist but only against Ceauşescu, not the communism of the 1950s and 1960s. He said that Iliescu made a "monumental" mistake in "conceding to the crowd" and banning the Romanian Communist Party.

As a supporter and activist of Soviet autopoiesis, Brucan also had important contributions to transatlantic geopolitics and the emergence of Eurasianism as a geopolitical concept.

== Later life ==
From the late 1990s, Brucan hosted a news commentary program on the ProTV network (Profeții despre trecut - "Foretellings on the Past"), initially together with Lucian Mândruță. During his final years, he was also a columnist for Ziarul Financiar.

In 1998, he was brought to court by Vasile Lupu, a leader of the Christian-Democratic National Peasants' Party (PNȚCD) and a deputy for Iași County. Speaking on his show, Brucan had called Lupu "astute to the square" and "trained Securitate informant" and indicated that "any good-faithed National Peasantist who still views himself as a party colleague with Vasile Lupu is self-excluding himself from the PNȚCD". In 2002, courts decided in Lupu's favour, and Brucan was found guilty of calumny. Brucan was required to pay Lupu the sum of 30 million lei as compensation.

At the age of 90, Brucan underwent a seven-hour stomach operation on 4 September 2006. Despite an initial good recovery from surgery, his condition suddenly worsened on 13 September, and he died the following day of cardiac arrest. Following his wishes, he was cremated at the Vitan-Bârzești Crematorium.

== Legacy ==
Writing in 2006, Vladimir Tismăneanu criticized Brucan, arguing that, despite his renunciation of Communism, Brucan had continued to support authoritarianism in public life and to display a taste for intrigue, and that he had attempted to transform the FSN into a "big party", virtually replacing the PCR. (The claim that FSN was leftist is dubious at best.)Tismăneanu pointed out Brucan's post-1990 opposition to Mircea Răceanu, who had been imprisoned for espionage under Ceauşescu, and who was later rehabilitated by Romanian courts. He has also contended that memoirs authored by Brucan showed little remorse, if not at all, for his early involvement in support of political repression.

According to Victor Neumann, Brucan's role in the Bucharest episode of the 1989 Revolution had apparently helped indirectly the original and virtually unrelated revolt in Timișoara, especially by preventing a more violent repression against it, but it was never explained. He also argued that Brucan's group of former inner-Party dissidents was, in the eyes of the uninformed public at large, the only "credible alternative" at the time, and cited Brucan's own statement: "The train had arrived in the station and we were the only ones who could get on it. What were we to say, that we will not get on? We did it". Overall, Neumann contended, Silviu Brucan's political and diplomatic expertise, as well as his adaptability, had made this old Stalinist the "ideologist of political transformations in 1989 Romania", and had contributed to the supremacy of left-wing discourse in the years following the Revolution (in regard to the latter point, he cited Brucan arguments, which challenged the existence of the right-wing themes in the ideological makeup of the 1989 movement).

== Works ==
=== English ===
- The Dissolution of Power: A Sociology of International Relations and Politics. New York: Knopf. 1971. ISBN 0-394-46741-8. OCLC 1067333438.
- The Dialectic of World Politics. New York: Free Press. 1978. ISBN 0-02-904680-7. OCLC 3607660.
- The Post-Brezhnev Era: An Insider's View. Praeger. 1983. ISBN 0-03-069409-4. OCLC 1039191538.
- World Socialism at the Crossroads: An Insider's View. New York: Praeger. 1987. ISBN 0-275-92782-2. OCLC 15628321.
- Pluralism and Social Conflict: A Social Analysis of the Communist World. New York: Praeger. 1990. ISBN 0-275-93475-6. OCLC 551634116.
- The Wasted Generation: Memoirs of the Romanian Journey from Capitalism to Socialism and Back. Boulder: Westview Press. 1993. ISBN 0-8133-1833-5. OCLC 1311140117.
- Social Change in Russia and Eastern Europe: From Party Hacks to Nouveaux Riches. Westport: Praeger. 1998. ISBN 0-275-96322-5. OCLC 38550880.

=== Romanian ===
- Sidorovici, Alexandra; Brucan, Silviu (1962). America văzută de aproape. În jurul lumii. București: Editura Tineretului. OCLC 895479662.
- Originile politicii americane Bucharest, Editura Științifică, 1968 – (Origins of the American policy)
- Democratizarea relațiilor internaționale: premise și realități, Bucharest, Editura Politică, 1975 – (The democratization of international relations: premisses and realities)
- Dialectica politicii internaționale, Cluj-Napoca, Editura Dacia, 1985 – (The dialectic of world politics)
- Pluralism și conflict social. O analiză socială a lumii comuniste, Bucharest, Editura Enciclopedică, 1990 – (Pluralism and social conflict. A social analysis of the communist world)
- Piață și democrație, Bucharest, Editura Științifică, 1990 – (Market and democracy)
- Îndreptar-dicționar de politologie, Bucharest, Nemira, 1993 – (Handbook-dictionary of politology)
- Stâlpii noii puteri în România, Bucharest, Nemira, 1996 – (The bases of the new power structure in Romania)
- Lumea după războiul rece. Locul României și viitorul ei, Bucharest, Editura România Liberă, 1996 – (The World after the Cold War. Romania's place and her future)
- O biografie între două revoluții: De la capitalism la socialism și retur, Bucharest, Nemira, 1998 – (A biography between two revolutions: from capitalism to socialism and back)
- România în derivă, Bucharest, Nemira, 2000 – (Romania adrift)
- Profeții despre trecut și despre viitor, Iași, Polirom, 2004 ISBN 973-681-692-3 – (Prophecies about the past and the future)
- Secolul XXI. Viitorul Uniunii Europene. Războaiele in secolul XXI, Iași, Polirom, 2005 ISBN 973-46-0119-9 – (The 21st century. The future of the European Union. Wars in the 21st century)
