= Avram Bunaciu =

Romanian politician

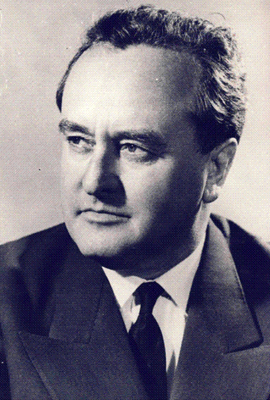

President of the State Council
- (Acting)
- In office 19 March 1965 – 24 March 1965 Serving with Ion Gheorghe Maurer and Ștefan Voitec
- Preceded by: Gheorghe Gheorghiu-Dej
- Succeeded by: Chivu Stoica

Minister of Justice of Romania
- In office 25 February 1948 – 23 September 1949
- Prime Minister: Petru Groza
- Preceded by: Lucrețiu Pătrășcanu
- Succeeded by: Stelian Nițulescu
- In office 31 December 1957 – 23 January 1958
- Prime Minister: Chivu Stoica
- Preceded by: Gheorghe Diaconescu
- Succeeded by: Gheorghe Diaconescu

Minister of Foreign Affairs of Romania
- In office 23 January 1958 – 20 March 1961
- Prime Minister: Chivu Stoica
- Preceded by: Ion Gheorghe Maurer
- Succeeded by: Corneliu Mănescu

Personal details
- Born: 11 November 1909 Gurba, Transylvania, Austria-Hungary
- Died: 28 April 1983 (aged 73) Bucharest, Socialist Republic of Romania
- Party: Romanian Communist Party
- Spouse: Noemi Nussbacher
- Children: 2
- Education: University of Cluj
- Occupation: Politician, jurist

Avram Bunaciu (Romanian pronunciation: [aˈvram buˈnat͡ʃju]; 11 November 1909 – 28 April 1983) was a Romanian communist politician and jurist who served as the Minister of Justice; Minister of Foreign Affairs; and, for five days in March 1965, the acting President of the State Council of Romania.

== Early life and political career ==
Bunaciu was born in 1909 in Gurba, a village not far from Arad, to a Greek-Catholic Romanian peasant family. Some far-right sources have claimed that he was of Jewish origin; however, according to recent research by Romanian historians, this claim has been discredited. During World War I, he and his elder brother were mobilized in the army and the family lived in poverty.

After graduating from the Samuil Vulcan High School in Beiuș, he studied Law from 1929 to 1933 at the University of Cluj. He was a communist intellectual during World War II and held several high ranking positions after the war, mostly within the Ministry of Justice. Bunaciu was a lawyer by profession and close ally to Ion Gheorghe Maurer, with whom he defended communists at pre-war trials. He was also close to Gheorghe Gheorghiu-Dej, who eventually became the President of the State Council and de facto ruler of Romania.

After the war, Bunaciu was one of the main prosecutors of the People's Tribunals. There were two such tribunals in post-war Romania (one in Bucharest and one in Cluj), which were charged with trials of individuals involved in war crimes. From 30 May to 4 June 1945, together with Alexandra Sidorovici, Constantin Vicol, and Ion D. Ioan, he prosecuted in Bucharest a dozen prominent journalists, including Pan M. Vizirescu, Pamfil Șeicaru, Stelian Popescu, Nichifor Crainic, Grigore Manoilescu, and Radu Gyr. Afterwards, Bunaciu was the Chief Public Prosecutor at the Cluj tribunal, which was set up on 22 June 1945, to prosecute war criminals. Bunaciu was involved in prosecuting mainly crimes committed by Hungarian authorities and their collaborators in Northern Transylvania, while the Bucharest tribunal mostly dealt with crimes perpetrated by Romanians under Marshal Ion Antonescu.

== State career ==
Bunaciu served as the Minister of Justice of Romania from 25 March 1948, until 23 September 1949. In 1952, he was appointed Deputy Minister of Foreign Affairs when Ana Pauker was the minister. At the time he also was the chairman of the National Assembly for the Application of Constitution. When Pauker was removed from power by the communist leadership aided by Joseph Stalin, Bunaciu left the foreign service and became the rector of the University of Bucharest in 1954. On 13 January 1958, he was appointed Minister of Foreign Affairs. On 20 March 1961, when he left the Ministry of Foreign Affairs, he was elected vice president of the State Council. From 19 March to 24 March 1965, before Nicolae Ceaușescu came to power, he was the acting President of the State Council. In 1971, he was awarded the Order of Tudor Vladimirescu, 2nd class.

== Personal life ==
He married Noemi Nussbacher (at the time, a fellow communist sympathiser) in Cluj in 1938; the Bunacius had two children, Tudor and Doina, a physicist now living in Switzerland. He died in 1983 in Bucharest.

== See also ==
- Romanian Communist Party
- Foreign relations of Romania
- Romanian People's Tribunals
