= Mircea Răceanu =

Romanian-born American diplomat (1935–2026)

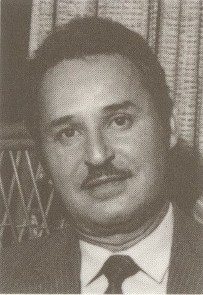
- Răceanu in the 1980s
- Born: Mircea Bernat; October 17, 1935
- Died: April 25, 2026 (aged 90)
- Citizenship: Romanian, American
- Occupations: Diplomat, political dissident, author

Mircea Răceanu (born Mircea Bernat; October 17, 1935 – April 25, 2026) was a Romanian diplomat and political dissident who, following his release from prison in December 1989 after the overthrow of the Ceaușescu communist regime, was forced into exile by the new Romanian authorities (FSN) and subsequently settled with his family in the United States. In 1992, he became a naturalized U.S. citizen.

He was initially sentenced to death under the Ceaușescu regime after being arrested on January 31, 1989, for collaborating with the American intelligence services and convicted of treason and espionage on July 20, 1989. However, the sentence was later commuted to a lengthy prison term following diplomatic efforts by the United States, including intervention during the administration of U.S. President George H. W. Bush.

Răceanu was the author of a few books, including Romania Versus the United States: Diplomacy of the Absurd, 1985–1989, co-authored with Roger Kirk, a former U.S. ambassador to Romania, as well as a book about what he experienced during his almost one-year imprisonment ordeal (327 days) under the Ceaușescu regime Infern '89. He also wrote a monograph on the history of U.S.–Romanian diplomatic relations, Cronologie comentată a relațiilor româno-americane: De la începutul cunoașterii reciproce până la prăbușirea regimului comunist în România, 1989 (Annotated Chronology of Romanian–American Relations: From the Beginnings of Mutual Knowledge to the Collapse of the Communist Regime in Romania, 1989).

== Early life ==
His parents were two Transylvanian members of the underground Romanian Communist Party (PCR) in the 1930s: a Romanian worker named Ileana Pop and a Jewish carpenter named Andrei Bernat, who was killed at Rîbnița by Fascists in 1944. Mircea was born in Văcărești Prison, where his mother was sentenced for Communist activities. After World War II, his mother married another old-time Communist, Grigore Răceanu.

Răceanu grew up in Bucharest, studying at the Ion Luca Caragiale High School and later in Moscow at the State Institute of International Relations.

== Diplomatic career ==
Răceanu started work at a department which dealt with the Romania–United States relations, and with time he was named the chief of this department. In 1969, he started working at the Embassy of Romania in Washington, D.C. and, between 1974 and 1979, he was the first secretary in the same embassy. After returning to Romania, he was the chief of the North America department, which dealt with the United States and Canada. Between 1982 and January 1989, he was the chief of diplomacy department which dealt with the relations with all the countries of the Americas.

While in the United States, Răceanu became an American secret agent, giving information from an insider's point-of-view on the politics of Romania and information on human rights and religious freedom. He said that he sent no national security or military information and that he betrayed his ruler, but not his country. Răceanu further stated that, during a talk with Rabbi Arthur Schneier, Nicolae Ceaușescu said that he did not actually leak any real secrets, but "betrayed me personally".

In 1989, a group of six former Romanian communist officials, including his stepfather, Grigore Răceanu, signed an open letter criticizing Ceaușescu's domestic policies and their impact on the livelihoods of most Romanians, particularly the declining standard of living in The Socialist Republic of Romania.

It is unknown whether Mircea Răceanu's arrest was connected to the preparation of the letter. His involvement in its preparation is also unknown. Arrested for treason on January 31, 1989, he was accused of treason and espionage, and only scant details of his arrest were disclosed six weeks later, when it was announced by the government press agency Agerpres. He was accused of espionage on behalf of the United States since 1974, when he served as a secretary at the Embassy of Romania in Washington, as well as maintaining links with the Perestroika-era Soviet Union. He was sentenced to death in July 1989, but in September, Ceaușescu commuted the sentence to 20 years in prison.

After the fall of the Ceaușescu regime, Silviu Brucan, a member of the post-1989 National Salvation Front (FSN) and a colleague of Grigore Răceanu—both signatories of the open letter—persuaded The U.S. Embassy to facilitate Mircea Răceanu's exile.

== After the Revolution ==
Răceanu was freed from Rahova Prison, Bucharest, on December 23, 1989, during the Romanian Revolution. After the revolution, he criticized the policies of the National Salvation Front, declaring to the New York Times that: "It is not over. There is still censorship of the press, and also of radio and television." He also spoke at several political rallies, including one in Bucharest and another at the border with Soviet Moldavia, claiming that the aides of Ceaușescu still held the key positions in the new government.

Silviu Brucan, a member of the National Salvation Front, said that he went to the U.S. Embassy in Romania and told a political officer that it would be best if Răceanu would leave for the United States. In the following days, according to Răceanu's declarations, there were two attempts to kill him, after which he decided to move to the United States.

Răceanu settled in a Washington, D.C. suburb and became an American citizen in 1992. In 1993, the Romanian court announced that his sentence was still valid, as that he was illegally released in 1989. Six years later, on June 11, 1999, a group of Romanian intellectuals asked that his sentence be overturned because Răceanu was an "anti-Communist fighter"; however, the sentence was reaffirmed, while the deputy attorney general declared that it was "impossible to rehabilitate Mircea Răceanu". A year later, Romania's supreme court of Justice, the High Court of Cassation and Justice, annulled the sentence and cleared Răceanu of all the accusations.[5] He was awarded the National Order of Merit in 2002 by President Ion Iliescu (de facto leader of the December-1989-established FSN and de facto leader of Romania after the fall of the Ceaușescu regime) for "helping Romania become a democracy".

Răceanu died on April 25, 2026, at the age of 90.

== Publications ==
In 2000, a book of his titled Infern '89 had a list of the Securitate members among the Romanian diplomats. In 2005, he published in Romania a book named Cronologie comentată a relațiilor româno-americane, which is a history of relations between Romania and the United States.

- Romania Versus the United States: Diplomacy of the Absurd, 1985-1989, with Roger Kirk; Palgrave Macmillan (1994) ISBN 0-312-12059-1
  - România împotriva Statelor Unite: Diplomaţia absurdului, 1895-1989, Silex, Bucharest (1995) ISBN 973-97037-0-4 (Translation)
- Infern '89: povestea unui condamnat la moarte Silex, Bucharest (2000) ISBN 973-9356-14-1
- Cronologie comentată a relațiilor româno-americane. De la începutul cunoașterii reciproce până la prăbușirea regimului comunist în România Silex, Bucharest, (2005) ISBN 973-9356-27-3
