= Tudor Vladimirescu, Galați =

Tudor Vladimirescu
- Commune
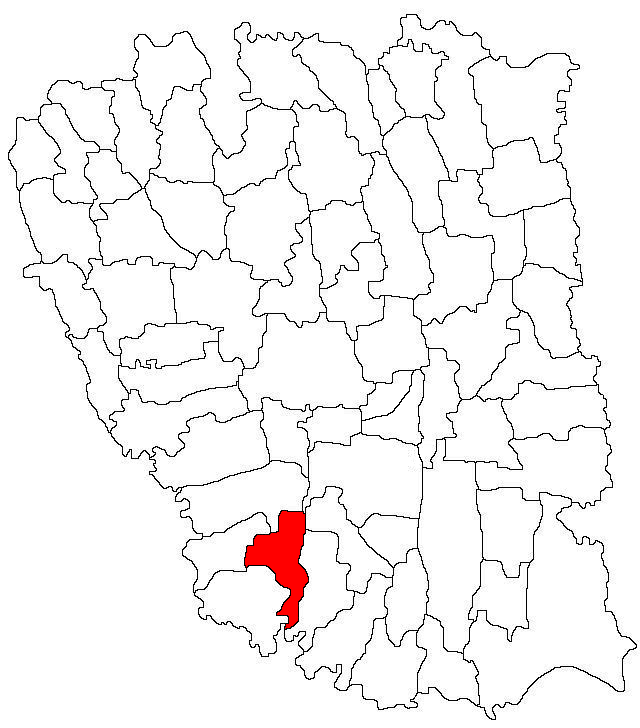
- Location in Galați County

- Location in Romania
- Coordinates: 45°34′N 27°38′E
- Country: Romania
- County: Galați

Government
  - Mayor (2020–2024): Costel Gheorghe (PSD)
- Area: 55.52 km^{2} (21.44 sq mi)
- Elevation: 18 m (59 ft)
- Population (2021-12-01): 5,032
  - Density: 91/km^{2} (230/sq mi)
- Time zone: EET/EEST (UTC+2/+3)
- Postal code: 807295
- Vehicle reg.: GL
- Website: www.tudor-vladimirescu.ro

Tudor Vladimirescu is a commune in Galați County, Western Moldavia, Romania with a population of 4,612 people. It is composed of a single village, Tudor Vladimirescu.

The commune is located in the southwestern part of the county, on the left bank of the Siret River, at the northern end of the Wallachian Plain. It lies on the DN25 county road, midway between Tecuci, 38 km (24 mi) to the north, and the county seat, Galați, 39 km to the east. The Galați–Tecuci CFR rail line also passes through Tudor Vladimirescu commune.

== Natives ==
- Gheorghe Apostol
