= Corneliu Mănescu =

Romanian politician (1916–2000)

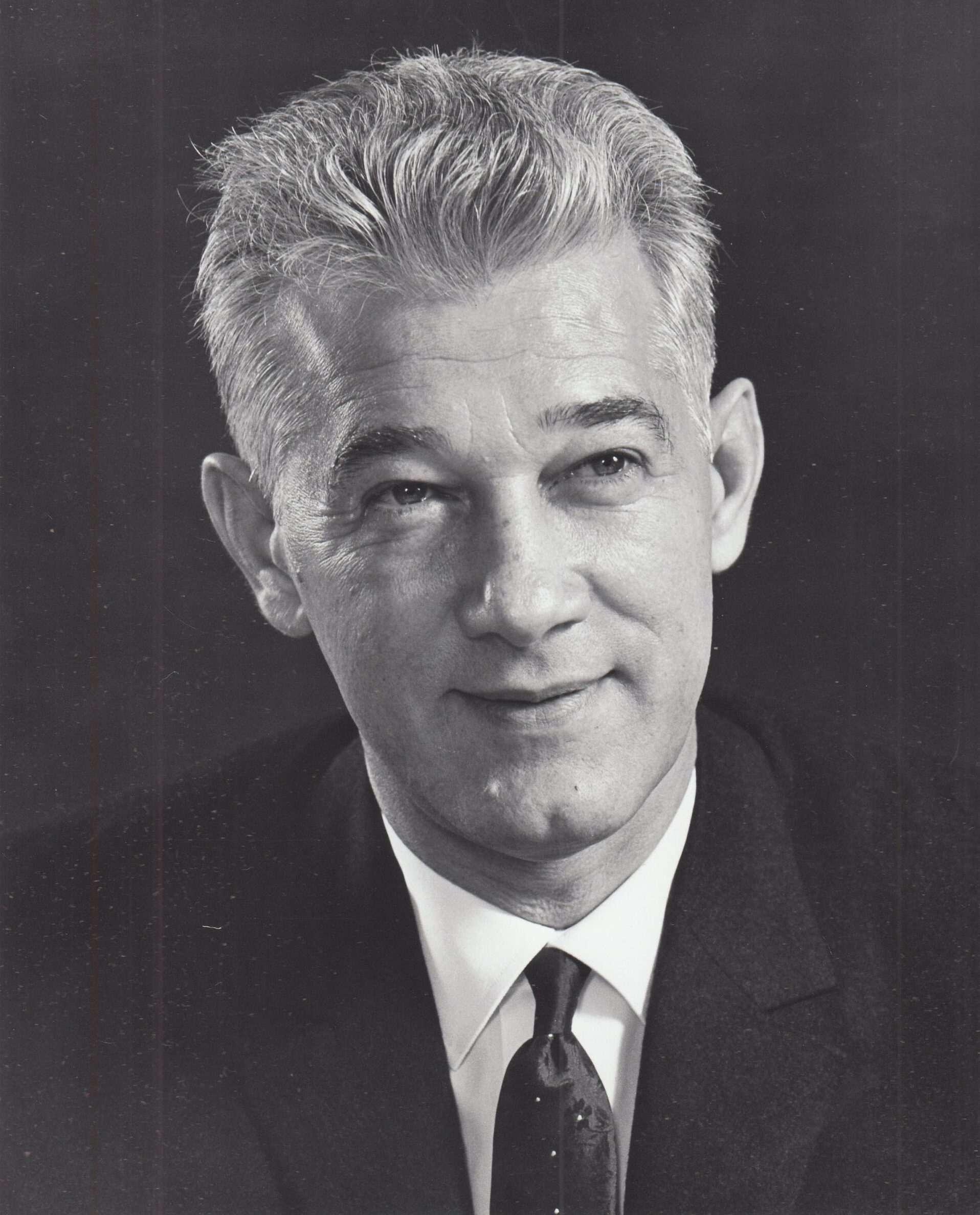
- Manescu, c. 1967

President of the United Nations General Assembly
- In office 19 September 1967 – 23 September 1968
- Preceded by: Abdul Rahman Pazhwak
- Succeeded by: Emilio Arenales Catalán

Member of the National Salvation Front Council
- In office 22 December 1989 – 26 December 1989

Minister of Foreign Affairs of Romania
- In office 20 March 1961 – 23 October 1972
- Prime Minister: Ion Gheorghe Maurer
- Preceded by: Avram Bunaciu
- Succeeded by: George Macovescu

Ambassador of Romania to France
- In office 15 March 1977 – 9 April 1982

Ambassador of Romania to Hungary
- In office 10 October 1960 – 20 March 1961

Member of the Great National Assembly
- In office 1965–1980

Personal details
- Born: 8 February 1916 Ploiești, Kingdom of Romania
- Died: 26 June 2000 (aged 84) Bucharest, Romania
- Party: Romanian Communist Party (1936–1989); National Salvation Front (1990–1992)
- Education: University of Bucharest

Corneliu Mănescu (8 February 1916 – 26 June 2000) was a Romanian diplomat born in Ploiești. He served as Minister of Foreign Affairs of Romania from 1961 to 1972 and as President of the United Nations General Assembly from 19 September 1967 to 23 September 1968.

== Life and political career ==
After completing his secondary studies in Ploiești, Mănescu went on to study law and economics at the University of Bucharest from 1936 to 1940. He joined the Romanian Communist Party in 1936.

While a student, he began writing for leftist publications, mostly about international relations. He was the leader of the Bucharest Communist students' organization until 1940.

In 1944 he was working at the Central Statistics Bureau, and in 1948 he was appointed as one of the vice ministers of the Ministry of National Defence, with the rank of lieutenant colonel. Promoted shortly after to colonel, he served from 1950 to 1952 as head of the National Military Circle. In 1959 he was named chief of the Higher Political Division of the Army, with the rank of major general. Between 1955 and 1960 he was vice president of the State Planning Committee.

In 1960, Mănescu became Director of the Political Division in the Ministry of Foreign Affairs. From 1960 to 1961, he served as Ambassador to Hungary. He was appointed Minister of Foreign Affairs in March 1961, a post in which he remained until 1972. Other important posts he held were that of vice president of the United Socialist Front, president of the Romanian Group of the Inter-Parliamentary Union, ambassador to France (1977–1982).

Mănescu, who became a member of Romanian Communist Party's Central Committee in 1965, was the first communist elected president of the UN General Assembly.

In 1989, he became the leader of the reformist movement within the Romanian Communist Party. In March 1989, together with five other Communist dignitaries (Gheorghe Apostol, Alexandru Bârlădeanu, Silviu Brucan, Constantin Pîrvulescu, and Grigore Răceanu), he signed the open letter known as Scrisoarea celor șase—"The Letter of the Six". After the Romanian Revolution of 1989, he was part of the interim council that administered Romania in 1990 from the overthrow of the Nicolae Ceaușescu government until elections could be held.

Mănescu married Doina Dobrescu in 1950. They had a daughter, Alexandra. He died in a hospital on 26 June 2000 in Bucharest, Romania.

Diplomatic posts
Preceded by Abdul Rahman Pazhwak	President of the United Nations General Assembly; 1967–1968	Succeeded by Emilio Arenales Catalán
