= George Macovescu =

Romanian writer and politician (1913–2002)

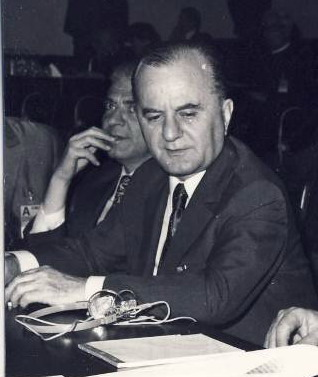
- Macovescu at Helsinki during the CSCE conference in 1975

Minister of Foreign Affairs of Romania
- In office 18 October 1972 – 8 March 1978
- President: Nicolae Ceaușescu
- Preceded by: Corneliu Mănescu
- Succeeded by: Ștefan Andrei

General Secretary of Ministry of Information of Romania
- In office 1945–1947

Personal details
- Born: 28 May 1913 Joseni, Buzău County, Kingdom of Romania
- Died: 20 March 2002 (aged 88) Valencia, Spain
- Spouse(s): Teri Macovescu; Emilia Macovescu
- Education: University of Bucharest

George Macovescu (Romanian pronunciation: [ˈdʒe̯ordʒe makoˈvesku]; 28 May 1913 – 20 March 2002) was a Romanian writer and communist politician who served as the General Secretary of Ministry of Information of Romania and Minister of Foreign Affairs of Romania.

== Life and political career ==
He was born in Joseni, Buzău County. In the 1930s, George Macovescu wrote articles for several left-wing newspapers, such as Adevărul and Dimineața. In 1939, he graduated from the University of Bucharest's Law School. In 1936, he joined the then illegal Communist Party of Romania, and after World War II started, he supported the anti-Nazi forces in German-aligned Romania. Around this time he also married a Jewish wife, Teri Ungar (Tereza).

After the war, Macovescu was the General Secretary of the Ministry of Information of Romania in 1945–1947. He was then appointed Ambassador of Romania to the United Kingdom and served there from 1947 until 1949. After he came back to Bucharest, Macovescu became the magistrate of the Ministry of Foreign Affairs of Romania from 1949 to 1952. He then worked as the Chief Magistrate of the Romanian cinematography from 1955 until 1959. In 1959–1961, he was the Ambassador of Romania to the United States and a member of the Romanian delegation to the United Nations. In 1961, upon his return to Romania, he was appointed the Deputy Minister of Foreign Affairs and in 1967 he became the First Deputy Minister subsequently becoming the Minister of Foreign Affairs on 18 October 1972. As the deputy minister and later minister, he took part in establishing better relations with Israel and tried to increase mediating role of Romania in Israeli–Egyptian conflict. Macovescu served as Minister until 1978. At the time, he was married to his second wife, Emilia Marinela Macovescu.

Macovescu also headed the Writers' Union of Romania from 1978 until 1982. It was in this role in 1979, as a delegate to the XII Romanian Communist Party Congress representing the Writers' Union, that Macovescu rose to discredit a dissident speech by Constantin Pîrvulescu which denounced Nicolae Ceaușescu's leadership as party leader; Macovescu defended Ceaușescu and called on the delegates to "pretend that we didn't even hear what Comrade Pîrvulescu said." From 1949 until 1981, he also taught at Department of Romanian Language and Literature of the University of Bucharest.

He died in Valencia, Spain in 2002.

== Writings ==
- Contradicții în Imperiul Britanic, București, 1950 (written under the pen name Victor Duran)
- Viața și opera lui Al. Sahia, București, 1950
- Gheorghe Lazăr, București, 1954
- Unele probleme ale reportajului literar, București, 1956
- Oameni și fapte, București, 1957
- Introducere în știința literaturii, București, 1962
- Vârstele timpului, București, 1971
- Catargele înalte, București, 1972
- Farmecul pământului, București, 1977
- Parfumul amar al pelinului verde. Jurnal la marginea dintre vis și viață, București, 1982
- Semnul dintre ochi, București, 1983
- Undeva, cândva, București, 1985
- Trecânde anotimpuri, București, 1988
- Jurnal, Vol. I, Domino, București, 2006

== See also ==
- Nicolae Ceaușescu
- Foreign relations of Romania
