= Letter of the Six =

1989 Romanian Communist Party open letter

The Letter of the Six (Romanian: Scrisoarea celor șase) was an open letter signed in March 1989 by six former high-ranking Romanian Communist Party dignitaries: Gheorghe Apostol, Alexandru Bârlădeanu, Silviu Brucan, Corneliu Mănescu, Constantin Pîrvulescu and Grigore Răceanu.

== Planning ==
The six communist politicians met and discussed the letter in parks in Bucharest, in order to prevent the Securitate from hearing the details. They were, however, not isolated, but were followed and had contacts with Soviet, American, British and Romanian intelligence officers and diplomats.

Brucan claimed in his memoirs that the initiative was his, who discussed the plan with Apostol and then discussed it with Bîrlădeanu, the architect of Romanian economic development of the 1960s.

After these first contacts, Brucan claimed to have paid visits to the embassies of the United States and of the United Kingdom in Bucharest. Unusually, the Securitate did not arrest him, and the government allowed him to visit the United States in June 1988. The Department of State was reportedly enthusiastic about the letter, but, according to Brucan, he was advised to publish it after returning to Romania, or else he would be forced to remain in exile. After this a tour of the United Kingdom followed, where he held conferences in Oxford and at the Royal Military Academy Sandhurst and had meetings at the Foreign Office; Brucan then went to Moscow, where he claimed to have met Gorbachev (though in an earlier account, Brucan only claimed to have met Alexander Yakovlev) in an hour-long meeting, being given assurances that if Ceaușescu was ousted, the Soviet Union would not intervene. During his return by train in November 1988, Brucan was arrested at the border, but he was let go.

Bîrlădeanu disputed the account of Brucan, arguing that, while they discussed the letter, it was called off after it proved impossible to gather enough signatures. Bîrlădeanu claims that Brucan betrayed the other co-signatories by going to the American embassy without telling the others.

== The letter's content ==
Addressed to President Nicolae Ceaușescu, the letter was a left-wing critique of Ceaușescu's policies. It appealed to the type of humanism supported by Mikhail Gorbachev, although the latter was not mentioned by name.

The text of the letter was very clear in its practical demands and set a stark tone, particularly the part in which they compare Romania with Africa, hinting to a future of underdevelopment.

== Broadcast ==
The document was immediately broadcast on Radio Free Europe, BBC Radio, and Voice of America.

== Authorities' reaction ==
The broadcast of the letter led to the swift arrest and interrogation of the signatories by the Securitate (the secret police), and then to their house arrest at various locations. Between 11 March and 7 May 1989, Brucan was interrogated 51 times. The Securitate depicted Brucan as one of several "hostile, inveterate, elements" and "the agent of foreign imperialist secret services".

Four of the six were moved from their houses in the exclusivist district of Primăverii to places like the outskirts of Bucharest and the other two were detained:

- Brucan was sent to a location on the outskirts of Bucharest, in Dămăroaia — the reason for his subsequent colloquial moniker, "The Oracle of Dămăroaia".
- Mănescu was moved to a two-room house with an earth floor in Chitila, his daughter was moved to Piatra Neamț
- Pîrvulescu was moved to a village near Vaslui
- Bîrlădeanu was moved in Vatra Luminoasă district of Bucharest
- Apostol and Răceanu were arrested and detained until the 1989 revolution

Despite increased pressure, most contributors to the protest refused to withdraw their statement. Brucan later accused Apostol of having given in to pressures.

== Importance ==
Although lacking in actual popular support, the letter was argued to be among the most important and influential acts of opposition during its period, and a notorious break with the tradition of strict obedience and party discipline.

Nevertheless, political scientist Michael Shafir argues that the act of collective dissent within the Party was "too little, too late" and that if it had been done in the mid-1970s, it might have had some consequences and could have been a starting point for some real changes.
