= Iosif Rangheț =

Austro-Hungarian-born Romanian communist activist and politician

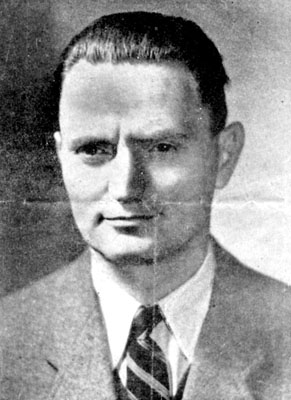
Iosif Rangheț

Iosif Rangheț (born Rangecz József, 7 August 1904 – 1 September 1952) was an Austro-Hungarian-born Romanian communist activist and politician.

Born into an ethnic Hungarian family, Rangheț was a native of Olari, Arad County. A leather dresser by profession, he joined a trade union in 1920 and became a member of the banned Romanian Communist Party (PCR) in 1930. He sat on the party's Arad County committee from 1931 to 1932, was secretary of the Oradea regional committee from 1932 to 1933. He held a similar post for Cluj from 1933 to 1934; that year, he became head of the Banat and Jiu Valley regional committees. From 1943 until his death, he was a member of the party's central committee.

In the mid-1930s Rangheț went to the Soviet Union, where he earned a degree from the Moscow State V. I. Lenin Pedagogical Institute. This is where he met a fellow communist activist, Sanda Veinberg (born in Murgeni in 1906), whom he married in 1935. In June 1938, Rangheț returned to Romania; together with his wife, he left for Arad, then for Timișoara, and after a year they arrived in Cluj. They would remain in Transylvania until the fall of 1940.

During World War II, Rangheț formed part of a small group of Romanian communists who were neither in exile in Moscow nor imprisoned. He participated at a meeting on 4 April 1944 in the Târgu Jiu prison camp hospital where, according to an official version later disseminated by the party, Gheorghe Gheorghiu-Dej demanded the removal of party general secretary Ștefan Foriș on the grounds that he was a police informer. Upon his removal, those present appointed a provisional secretariat to head the party; it consisted of Emil Bodnăraș, Constantin Pîrvulescu, and Rangheț. This troika remained in office until September 1944, by which time the PCR had been legalized in the aftermath of King Michael's Coup. Beginning in April 1948, Rangheț, together with Teohari Georgescu, Alexandru Drăghici and, at times, Gheorghiu-Dej, belonged to a party commission charged with investigating the arrested communist and former Justice Minister Lucrețiu Pătrășcanu.

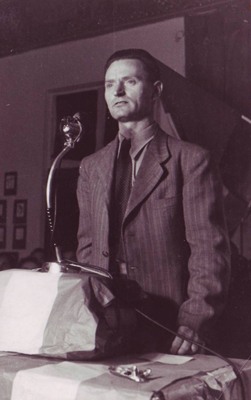
Rangheț giving a speech

From 1945 to 1948, Rangheț headed the PCR's cadres section; in that capacity, he reported that the PCR had on 23 August 1944 "less than 1,000 party members, including the comrades from prisons and concentration camps", from which only 80 in Bucharest. From 1949 to 1950, he presided over the state combustibles committee. He was elected to the Assembly of Deputies for Timiș-Torontal County in 1946. In 1948, following the establishment of a Communist regime, he obtained an Arad seat in the Great National Assembly, holding it until his death. Also in 1948, he became an alternate member of the politburo.

Rangheț was awarded the Order of the Star of the Romanian People's Republic, first class in 1948; the Defense of the Fatherland Order, second class and the Order of Labor, second class in 1949; and the medal for freeing the fatherland from the fascist yoke. His wife, Sanda Rangheț, survived him; she committed suicide in 1995. Their son, Boris, would become a diplomat, and serve as Ambassador of Romania to Malaysia in 1990–1993.

A lathe factory, established in Arad in 1949, was renamed after his death the Iosif Rangheț Plant. Renamed years later as Strungul Arad, and privatized in 2002 under the name ARIS Arad, it closed in 2009, after producing more than 100,000 lathes over a 60-year span.
