= National communism in Romania =

State ideology of Romania, 1960s to 1989

National communism in Romania is a term referring to a form of quasi-official state ideology mixing principles of Marxism-Leninism with nationalistic rhetoric promoted in the Socialist Republic of Romania between the early 1960s and 1989; the term itself was not used by the Romanian Communist Party. Having its origins in Gheorghe Gheorghiu-Dej's political emancipation from the Soviet Union, it was greatly developed by Nicolae Ceaușescu, who began in 1971, through his July Theses manifesto, a national cultural revolution. Part of the national mythology was Nicolae Ceaușescu's cult of personality and the idealization of Romanian history, known in Romanian historiography as protochronism. Due to its association with Ceaușescu, Romanian national communism is sometimes referred to as Ceaușescuism.

This nationalistic ideology was built upon a mixture of both Marxist–Leninist principles and doctrines of Romanian nationalism. The driving force behind the ideology of national communism was the belief that Romanians are an isolated "Latin island" in Eastern Europe who have endlessly and unanimously fought off external forces throughout two thousand years to achieve unity and independence.

== Internationalist era ==
Before World War II, the historical ideology was based on Romanian nationalism and the main dispute in Romanian society was between people who promoted indigenous traditions and those who wanted a Western values-based society. Marxists played only a minor role in Romanian culture and, according to historiographer Lucian Boia, the Romanian Left was typically of rural traditional pre-capitalist persuasion, rather than in support of a post-capitalist workers' state as elsewhere in Europe. In this context, the ideological change in the Romanian society after the Communists came to power in Romania appeared more radical.

In the space of a few years, the history of Romania had been rewritten: while the pre-war history had been written from a nationalist point of view, the new history was written in an internationalist spirit. For instance, in Mihail Roller's "History of Romania", the 1859 unification of Moldavia and Wallachia was seen as the will of the bourgeois and boyars, who benefited from it, the decision being taken without the consideration of the will of the people. The Union of Bessarabia with Romania was seen as being an "imperialist intervention against the Socialist Revolution in Russia" and the Union of Transylvania with Romania was considered an occupation.

A major change occurred regarding the relationship of the Romanians with the Western world. Before the war, the national mythology considered Romanians "An island of Latinity in a Slavic sea". Roller's history emphasized the cohabitation of Romanians and Slavs in the Middle Ages and discussed the connections between the Slavs and Romanians, ending with the "liberation of Romania by the glorious Soviet Army".

== Independence from Soviet Union ==
Starting with late 1950s, Romanian nationalism gradually became part of the official ideology, in parallel with a diminution of Slavic, Russian, and Soviet importance within Romanian history. This process culminated with the "declaration of independence" of April 1964, when it abandoned internationalism.

== Rehabilitation of cultural figures ==
The Communist regime integrated the whole Romanian heritage into its national ideology. For instance, right-wing historian Nicolae Iorga was rehabilitated for being "anti-fascist" (having been assassinated by the Iron Guard), his works being republished with the exception of those that directly argued against communism. Eugen Lovinescu's History of Modern Romanian Civilization was republished in an abridged version and the introduction said Lovinescu's work was not anti-Marxist polemic and that it had common points with historical materialism.

Even fascist Conducător Ion Antonescu was semi-rehabilitated, getting a much gentler treatment than previously, in line with the nationalism and the façade of anti-Sovietism. This was part of a strategy of inserting "great leaders" throughout the Romanian history narrative, to serve Ceaușescu's cult of personality, Antonescu being seen as a "misunderstood patriot" rather than a traitor. This process began with Marin Preda's novel Delirul (1975), continuing with Aurică Simion's Preliminarii politico-diplomatice ale insurecției române din august 1944 (1979), before becoming part of the official ideology in Ilie Ceaușescu's Istoria militară a poporului român, vol 6 (1989).

== Ceaușescu's cultural revolution ==
Beginning with the 1960s, the Romanian government began to permit greater liberties and treat its citizens better, including an amnesty of political prisoners and allowing more freedom of expression, such as in the nuances that were appropriate in literature. This all ended with the July Theses of 1971, which ended the liberalisation and openness, beginning a trend that accentuated the totalitarianism and isolated Romania from the rest of the world. This was known as Ceaușism, or Ceaușescuism.

Nationalism became ubiquitous and the most important political argument. Romanians were depicted as being united throughout their history around the Leader.

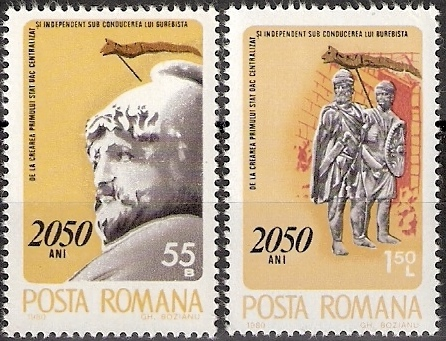
1980 Romanian stamp, labeled "2050 years from the creation of the first Dacian state, centralised and independent under the rule of Burebista"

Historical research began focusing on the ancient era, especially the Dacian (pre-Roman) era. The "Institute of History of the Party", specialised in writing monographs on trade unionists, labour struggle and working class heroes, began studying the Dacians, politicising ancient history. In 1980, the Romanian government celebrated the 2050th anniversary of the founding of the unitary and centralised state under Burebista, most notably in the epic film Burebista.
