= Brașov rebellion =

1987 revolt against Romanian dictator Nicolae Ceaușescu's economic policies

Brașov Rebellion
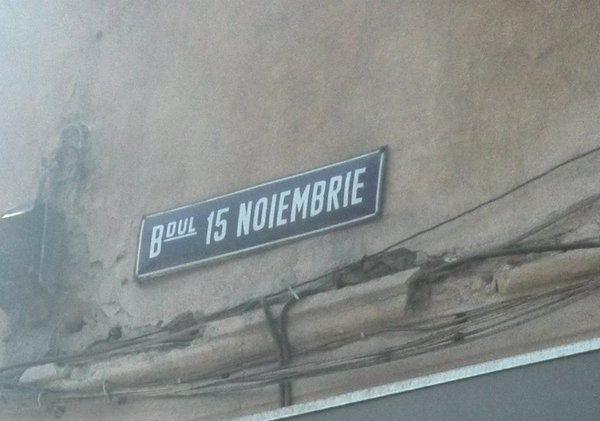
- 15 November Boulevard in Brașov in memory of the Brașov Rebellion
- Location: Brașov, Romania
- Date: 15 November 1987
- Target: Communist headquarters and city hall
- Perpetrators: Workers from Steagul Roșu plant, Tractor Plant, Hidromecanica factory
- No. of participants: 20,000 workers
- Defender: Securitate

The Rebellion of Brașov was a revolt against Nicolae Ceaușescu's economic policies in Communist Romania, which erupted on the day of the 1987 local election.

== Prelude ==
Beginning in late 1986, the seeds of the Romanian Revolution of 1989 were sown, as workers throughout this Soviet Bloc country mobilized in protest of communist leader Nicolae Ceaușescu's economic policies. Labor uprisings sprouted in the major industrial centers of Cluj-Napoca (November 1986) and Nicolina, Iași (February 1987), culminating in a massive strike in Brașov, one of the largest cities in Romania. Ceaușescu's draconian economic measures sought to curb food and energy consumption and reduce worker's wages.

Though Romania was the last of the Warsaw Pact countries to succumb to revolution in 1989, this sentiment captures the social and economic volatility of Romania in the late 1980s. The Brașov Revolt reflected this instability; moreover, it was one of the first large-scale public uprisings against the Ceaușescu regime.

Located in southeastern Transylvania, Brașov was Romania's most industrially developed city, with over 61% of labor participating in industry. A skilled working class emerged in the 1960s as the Communist government encouraged migrations from the more rural regions of Romania (such as Moldavia) to operate Brașov factories. Therefore, the industrial decline in Eastern Europe during the mid-1980s hit Brașov and its workers especially hard.

Ceaușescu's debt reduction plan beginning in 1982 led to the collapse of the consumer market of the city. Money intended for food production and distribution was in turn diverted to debt payment to the Western Bloc. Therefore, the state rationed key foodstuff and consumer goods, leading to long lines for the most basic commodities. It is in this climate of economic depression and food shortages that the Brașov rebellion erupted on 15 November 1987.

== Rebellion ==
Early on the morning of November 15, 1987, a local elections day, workers at the local Steagul Roșu plant (truck manufacturer) protested reduced salaries and the proposed elimination of 15,000 jobs in the city. Roughly 20,000 workers walked off the job and marched toward the Communist headquarters at the city center. Firstly, the demonstrators loudly expressed wage claims, then they shouted slogans like "Down with Ceaușescu!", "Down with Communism!", chanting anthems of the 1848 Revolution "Down with the Dictatorship" and "We want bread."

Over 20,000 workers from the Brașov Tractor Factory and the Hidromecanica factory, as well as a number of townspeople joined the march. The combined mob sacked the headquarters building and city hall "throwing into the square portraits of Ceaușescu, and food from the well-stocked canteen." In a time of drastic food shortages, protesters were particularly angered to find festively prepared official buildings and food abundance in order to celebrate the local election victory. A massive bonfire of party records and propaganda burned for hours in the city square.

By dusk, Securitate forces and the military surrounded the city center and disbanded the revolt by force. Though no one was killed, some 300 protesters were arrested. In the period that protesters were being detained they were tortured by state investigators (Miliție and Securitate).

However, since the regime decided to play down the uprising as “isolated cases of hooliganism,” sentences were between 6 months and 3 years in prison, a relatively moderate penalty in the communist penal code, but they were deported to other cities around the country and not allowed to return to Brașov. After 1990, up to 100 prison convictions could be documented so far.

Though the Brașov Rebellion did not directly lead to revolution, it dealt a serious blow to the Ceaușescu regime, and its confidence in the trade unions. This revolt reflected what historian Dennis Deletant referred to as "Ceaușescu's inability to heed the warning signs of increasing labor unrest, plunging blindly forward with the same [economic] measures, seemingly indifferent to their consequences." Therefore, the Brașov Rebellion underscored the growing discontent among workers against the Ceaușescu regime; moreover, it foreshadowed the popular uprisings that would bring down the regime and Communism in Romania only two years later. Rebellion returned to Brașov in December 1989, when Romanians ousted the regime and executed Ceaușescu.
