= Gheorghe Apostol =

Romanian politician (1913–2010)

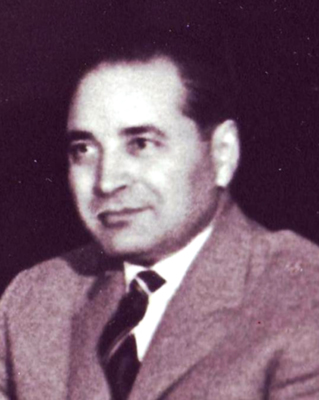

First Secretary of the Romanian Workers' Party
- In office 19 April 1954 – 30 September 1955
- Preceded by: Gheorghe Gheorghiu-Dej
- Succeeded by: Gheorghe Gheorghiu-Dej

First Vice President of the Council of Ministers
- In office 21 March 1961 – 3 January 1967
- Prime Minister: Ion Gheorghe Maurer
- Preceded by: Office not in use
- Succeeded by: Ilie Verdeț

President of the Great National Assembly
- In office 26 March 1952 – 6 June 1952
- Preceded by: Ion Vincze
- Succeeded by: Gheorghe Stoica
- In office 6 September 1950 – 5 April 1951
- Preceded by: Constantin Doncea
- Succeeded by: Ion Vincze
- In office 7 April 1948 – 11 June 1948
- Preceded by: Position established
- Succeeded by: Constantin Agiu

Minister of Agriculture
- In office 5 November 1953 – 18 May 1954
- Prime Minister: Gheorghe Gheorghiu-Dej
- Preceded by: Constantin Prisnea
- Succeeded by: Constantin Popescu

Personal details
- Born: 16 May 1913 Tudor Vladimirescu, Galați, Kingdom of Romania
- Died: 21 August 2010 (aged 97) Bucharest, Romania
- Party: Workers' Party of Romania
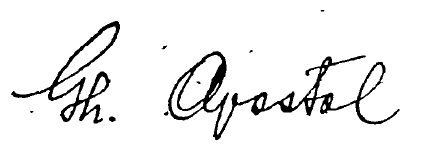
- Signature

Gheorghe Apostol (16 May 1913 – 21 August 2010) was a Romanian politician, deputy Prime Minister of Romania and a leader of the Communist Party (PCR), noted for his rivalry with Nicolae Ceaușescu.

== Early life ==
Apostol was born near Tudor Vladimirescu, Galați County.

After training at the Căile Ferate Române (CFR) school, he worked in a CFR foundry in Galați. In 1932, Apostol met Gheorghe Gheorghiu-Dej, and became involved in the communist underground. He joined the Party in 1934 and became its link with the railway trade unions and left-leaning groups in Galați.

Arrested several times, Apostol was sentenced in 1937 to three years in prison, which he served in Galați and Doftana. His activities upon his release from jail got him interned in camps for political prisoners, at Târgu Jiu, Caracal, and Miercurea Ciuc. In August 1944, as the Red Army was approaching the Romanian border, Apostol and several communist figures who were being detained at Târgu Jiu escaped and made their way to the underground. This version of the story follows Apostol's official biography of the 1950s; photos taken upon the liberation of the camp (published in Dosarele Istoriei, for instance), allegedly showing him in the middle of the crowd of former prisoners, made some doubt this account.

== With Gheorghiu-Dej ==
He was among the most prominent collaborators of Gheorghiu-Dej. As members of the so-called prison faction, opposed to the large group of Party members who had taken refuge in the Soviet Union prior to 1944, Gheorghe Apostol and Gheorghiu-Dej walked the fine line between Stalinism and reformism. Thus, Communist Romania did not steer away from Soviet policies until 1953, and Gheorghiu-Dej even got Joseph Stalin's approval for the removal of rival Ana Pauker on charges of right wing deviance and cosmopolitism, as well as for the elimination of Lucrețiu Pătrășcanu (a Romanian communist who deviated from the Party line in notable respects). After Stalin's death in 1953, the regime in Romania, headed by the same inner circle, was largely opposed to Nikita Khrushchev and de-Stalinization, while carrying out its own reforms and attempting to cut off economic ties to the Soviet Union.

Apostol continued to be the favoured link between the Party (then named Partidul Muncitoresc Român, PMR – "Romanian Workers' Party") and the trade unions. At the same time, he climbed steadily in the Party hierarchy. He joined the Central Committee in 1945 and the Politburo in 1948. In 1947, he was awarded the Order of the Crown of Romania, Commander class. He was Minister of Agriculture in 1953–54, a member of the Great National Assembly legislative body, whose President he also was from April 1948 to June 1948, September 1950 to April 1951 and March 1952 to June 1952, and recipient of several national honours. In 1954, Gheorghiu-Dej gave up the first secretaryship of the party to Apostol, while remaining as prime minister. However, it was understood that Gheorghiu-Dej still held the real power, and he formally took back the party leadership in 1955.

According to Apostol himself, an ailing Gheorghiu-Dej would have decided to appoint him as his successor in 1964: as confirmation, Apostol was sent to represent the Romanian government at Jawaharlal Nehru's funeral. Ion Gheorghe Maurer rallied the Party leadership around the neutral option represented by Ceaușescu, making sure that Apostol did not represent a threat upon Gheorghiu-Dej's death.

== Hostility to Ceaușescu ==
As a result, Apostol became hostile to Ceaușescu's policies, stating that they went against the legacy of Gheorghiu-Dej (in 2003, he described the latter as democratic socialism). He refused to pay the allegiance demanded by the new leader. Protected by Emil Bodnăraș, he was advised to take refuge in a diplomatic career, becoming ambassador to Argentina, Uruguay and then Brazil.

In 1988, at the peak of Nicolae Ceaușescu's leadership, Apostol returned to Romania and contacted other communist figures of his generation (such as Alexandru Bârlădeanu, Silviu Brucan, Corneliu Mănescu, Constantin Pîrvulescu, and Grigore Răceanu) drafting an open letter of protest (dubbed Scrisoarea celor șase – "Letter of the Six"), directed at the government and made public (on 11 March 1989) through the means of both Radio Free Europe and Voice of America. According to Apostol, several Letter contributors expressed their concern at having to use "imperialist means of propaganda".

As a result, Apostol was placed under house arrest, being constantly interrogated, in the hope that he would reveal himself as a "Soviet spy". The Romanian Revolution, which the Letter had helped along, liberated him in December.

Apostol died on 21 August 2010 at the age of 97.

== Family ==
Apostol was married from 1935 to 1947. From 1944 he lived with, and later married, Melita Schaerf (d. 1991), a Romanian journalist. They separated in 1956 and subsequently divorced. In 1965, Apostol married his third wife, Adriana Codreanu (born 21 December 1934). He had three children.

Party political offices
Preceded by Gheorghe Gheorghiu-Dej	First Secretary of the Romanian Communist Party; 1954–1955	Succeeded by Gheorghe Gheorghiu-Dej
