= Grigore Răceanu =

Romanian dissident

Grigore Ion Răceanu (1906–1996) was a Romanian communist politician and opponent of Nicolae Ceaușescu.

Born in Cojocna, Cluj County, he became a train driver for Căile Ferate Române. He was also a trade union leader, being one of the organizers of the strikes of Cluj in 1929-1933. He became a member of the underground Romanian Communist Party in 1936. Toward the end of the 1930s, he moved to Brașov, where he worked for Industria Aeronautică Română. In September 1940, he organized a protest in Brașov against the Second Vienna Award.

During World War II, Răceanu lived in Bucharest, where his views conflicted with those of Ștefan Foriș, the leader of the Communist Party. Răceanu criticized the stance of the party on its obedience to the orders of the Soviet Union, especially on the annexation of Bessarabia and Northern Bukovina in June 1940. Due to this, in 1942, he was excluded from the party.

After the war, Răceanu was accepted again as a member of the party, but soon after, in 1958, he was excluded once again and arrested as an enemy of the people for his opinions, being freed from prison in 1960. Grigore Răceanu married Ileana Pop and became the stepfather of Mircea Răceanu, who later became a noted diplomat.

In March 1989, he was one of the six old-time Communists (together with Gheorghe Apostol, Alexandru Bârlădeanu, Silviu Brucan, Corneliu Mănescu, and Constantin Pîrvulescu), who signed a letter ("The Letter of the Six") that criticized Ceaușescu's policies and was made public by BBC World Service, Voice of America, and Radio Free Europe. As a result of this letter, Răceanu was declared a traitor and put under house arrest, being freed after the Romanian Revolution.
