= Anton Moisescu =

Romanian politician (1913–2002)

Anton Moisescu (12 February 1913 – 2002) was a Romanian politician who was the acting Chairman of the Presidium of the Grand National Assembly from 7 January 1958 until 11 January 1958, together with Mihail Sadoveanu, and thus interim head of state. Serving on the Central Committee of the Romanian Communist Party (PCR) from 1955 to 1969, he was ambassador to the United States of America (1954–1956) and to Argentina (1956–1957).
