= Constantin Pîrvulescu =

Romanian politician

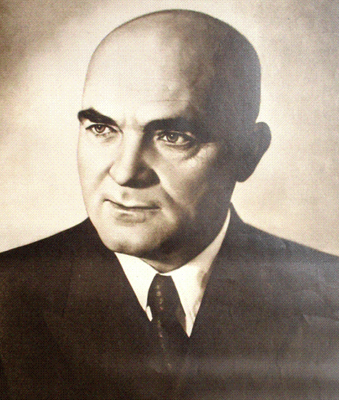

General Secretary of the Romanian Communist Party
- In office April 1944 – September 1944
- Preceded by: Ștefan Foriș
- Succeeded by: Gheorghe Gheorghiu-Dej

Personal details
- Born: 10 November 1895 Olănești, Vâlcea County, Kingdom of Romania
- Died: 11 July 1992 (aged 96) Roman, Romania
- Party: Communist Party of Romania (1921—1980); Socialist Party of Labour (1990—1992)
- Spouse: Suzana Pîrvulescu (1898–1942)

Constantin Pîrvulescu (November 10, 1895 – July 11, 1992) was a Romanian communist politician and one of the founders of the Romanian Communist Party (PCR), who, as time went on, became an active opponent of leader Nicolae Ceaușescu. Briefly expelled from the party in 1960, he was re-admitted and elected to the Party Revision Committee in 1974.

In April 1944, acting on the orders of the still imprisoned Gheorghe Gheorghiu-Dej, Pîrvulescu, along with Iosif Rangheț and Emil Bodnăraș, captured and deposed PCR general secretary Ștefan Foriș at gunpoint forcing him to resign his position due to charges by Gheorghiu-Dej that he was a police informer. Pîrvulescu, Rangheț, and Bodnăraș, as a troika, replaced him as a provisional secretariat until Gheorghiu-Dej escaped from prison and took up the position of general secretary of the party in September 1944.

In November 1979, at the 12th Party Congress, Pîrvulescu took the floor advocating against the re-election of Ceaușescu to the party leadership, accusing him of putting personal interests ahead of those of party and nation. He also accused the congress of neglecting the country's real problems, and being preoccupied with glorifying Ceaușescu. This unprecedented attack came from a man who was a lifelong communist, with a lifelong association with Soviet-style communism (he was the only member of the Central Committee to oppose Nikita Khrushchev's withdrawal of Soviet troops in 1958). Likewise, being 84 years of age, personal ambition could not be a motivating factor for this speech. Thus, the Western press considered his remarks to be proof of dissatisfaction within the Party's ranks. Pîrvulescu was kicked out of the room, stripped of his position as delegate to the congress and placed under strict supervision and house arrest. On January 16, 1980, he was expelled from the PCR.

In March 1989, he was one of the signatories of the open letter known as Scrisoarea celor șase – "The Letter of the Six", together with five other communist dignitaries (Gheorghe Apostol, Alexandru Bârlădeanu, Grigore Răceanu, Corneliu Mănescu, and Silviu Brucan). The document, which was immediately broadcast on Radio Free Europe and Voice of America, was a left-wing critique of Ceaușescu's policies, and led to the swift arrest and interrogation of the signatories by the Securitate, and then to their assignment to forced residence at various locations.

He was married to Suzana Pîrvulescu (1898–1942), herself a PCR activist who was imprisoned from 1936 to 1939.

After the Romanian Revolution, he was made the honorary president of the Socialist Party of Labour. He then died on July 11, 1992.

Party political offices
Preceded by Ștefan Foriș	First secretary of the Romanian Communist Party; 1944	Succeeded by Gheorghe Gheorghiu-Dej
