= Alexandru Bârlădeanu =

Romanian Marxian economist and statesman

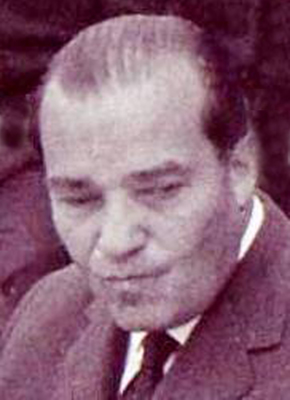

President of the Senate of Romania
- In office 18 June 1990 – 16 October 1992
- Preceded by: Position established
- Succeeded by: Oliviu Gherman

Vice President of the Council of Ministers
- In office 3 October 1955 – 27 January 1969
- Prime Minister: Chivu Stoica; Ion Gheorghe Maurer

Chairman of the State Planning Committee
- In office 4 October 1955 – 26 May 1956
- Prime Minister: Chivu Stoica
- Preceded by: Miron Constantinescu
- Succeeded by: Gheorghe Gaston Marin

Minister of Foreign Trade
- In office 7 October 1948 – 18 May 1954
- Prime Minister: Petru Groza; Gheorghe Gheorghiu-Dej
- Succeeded by: Marcel Popescu

President for the National Scientific Research Council
- In office 9 December 1967 – 11 December 1968
- Prime Minister: Ion Gheorghe Maurer
- Preceded by: Roman Moldovan
- Succeeded by: Nicolae Murguleț

Personal details
- Born: 25 January 1911 Comrat, Bessarabia, Russian Empire
- Died: 13 November 1997 (aged 86) Bucharest, Romania
- Children: 2
- Education: Politehnica University of Bucharest (did not graduate)
- Occupation: Marxian economist

Alexandru Bârlădeanu (or Bîrlădeanu; 25 January 1911 – 13 November 1997) was a Romanian Marxian economist and statesman who was prominent during the communist regime until being sidelined in 1968. In his later years, following the collapse of the regime, he served as Senate President.

== Biography ==
=== Origins and early career ===
Bârlădeanu was born into a family of teachers in Comrat in the Imperial Russian province of Bessarabia. According to an interview he gave late in life, he was neither Gagauz nor Jewish, as sometimes claimed, but an ethnic Romanian. His great-grandfather came from the Bârlad area but settled in Bessarabia, while his mother was the daughter of a Romanian Orthodox priest who had attended the seminary in Huși. His parents divorced before he turned two. Following the Soviet occupation of Bessarabia, his father, a National Liberal Party–Brătianu affiliate, was deported to Siberia, where he died. He attended primary school in the villages where his mother taught, finishing at Căușeni in 1921, studying in Tighina in 1921–1926 and attending the Boarding High School in Iași from 1926 to 1928, when he earned his baccalauréat. Too poor to enroll at the University of Iași, he returned to Bessarabia. His first job was in 1928, as a functionary at the Tighina school inspectorate. For the following eight years, he was a mathematics tutor for high schoolers and substitute teacher at the commercial school and the apprentices' school in Iași. From 1929 to 1931, he attended Politehnica University of Bucharest sporadically, but did not graduate. His mother was unable to support him, and he returned to the Tighina inspectorate for a time. From 1933 to 1937, he attended the Political Economy section of the University of Iași Law faculty, receiving his doctorate in 1940, having worked as university assistant under Gheorghe Zane for the preceding three years. During the communist regime, he twice intervened to have Zane released from prison, the second time unsuccessfully. Generally thought to have joined the banned Romanian Communist Party (PCR) in 1943, other sources place the date at 1935. In either case, the student environment at Iași had drawn him into communist circles by 1933, a move bolstered by his reading of Marxist texts and the widespread poverty of the period. Between 1934 and 1936 he headed the communist-inspired student organization "United Centers", worked on the leftist newspaper Manifest, and was an active member of the Antifascist League, the Tighina Antifascist Committee and Amicii URSS. In 1936, he was also in the leadership of the Iași section of the Democratic Students' Front. During this period, he came to know Lucrețiu Pătrășcanu, who had arrived in Iași to defend a client.

The June 1940 Soviet occupation of Bessarabia found him on vacation there; he chose to remain and become a Soviet citizen, while his mother, aunt and sister sought refuge in Romania. In September 1940 he began working at the Institute for Scientific Research in Chișinău, forced to flee in June 1941 following the province's recapture by Romania. Ending up in the Karaganda area, for nearly two years he was a teacher, school director, miner and party activist on a kolkhoz, until being sent to Moscow in 1943 to resume his studies. An active member of the Romanian communist exile circle in the Soviet Union during World War II, he worked in the Romanian-language division of Radio Moscow (1943–1945); contributed to TASS and to Graiul liber, the newspaper of Romanian prisoners in the Soviet Union (1943–1946); and was a teacher at the Romanian section of the anti-fascist school for prisoners (1944–1946), heading it in 1945. A member of the Communist Party of the Soviet Union, he undertook the latter task as a party employee, helping indoctrinate Romanian prisoners. He also studied political economy at the Plekhanov Moscow Institute of the National Economy from 1943 to 1946 on a scholarship from the Chișinău institute. He taught there as well during his last year of study, but did not graduate because he left the country. He was brought back to Romania in June 1946 at the PCR's request, officially joining the party after recommendations from Leonte Răutu and Mihail Roller. From June to November 1946, he worked as instructor and assistant director at the central committee's economic section, beginning a rise that was aided by his start in an important position and his educated background.

=== Years in power ===
His return to Romania saw him beginning to hold influential positions in economic ministries. In 1946, he was chosen economic expert on the government committee participating in the negotiation of the Paris Peace Treaties. In December 1946 he became secretary general at the National Economy Ministry, serving until the following August, when he was transferred to the Industry and Commerce Ministry in an equivalent position, remaining until March 1948. He was thus part of the group that enacted the 1947 monetary reform. Following the establishment of a Communist regime, he was, together with Gheorghe Gaston Marin, a creator of the planned economy imposed on the country, serving successively during 1948 as deputy Industry and then Commerce Minister. Top posts in foreign trade and planning came: Minister of Foreign Trade (1948–1954), vice president (1954) and president (1955–1956) of the State Planning Committee, deputy prime minister for economic issues (1955–1965 and 1967–1969) and first deputy prime minister (1965–1967). As Romania's representative at the Comecon between 1955 and 1966, he frustrated Soviet plans for creating a supranational economic area, earning him the enmity of Nikita Khrushchev. During the same period, he also represented Romania at the United Nations Economic Commission for Europe. Meanwhile, he began opening the economy to the West, signing economic and commercial agreements with France, the United Kingdom, Switzerland, the Netherlands and Belgium as early as 1959, later promoting ties to West Germany and Italy. In 1964, he helped conceive a foreign policy declaration of active neutrality within the communist bloc, wherein Romania was no longer subservient to the Soviet Union but neither embraced the militant outlook of China under Mao Zedong.

He was a member of the Romanian Academy despite not having written any noteworthy scientific publications, elected in 1955 alongside high-ranking party members Ion Gheorghe Maurer and Lothar Rădăceanu, and served as its vice president from 1990 to 1994. He was also an honorary member of the Academy of Sciences of Moldova. Starting in 1949, he taught for many years at the Bucharest Academy of Economic Studies, later heading its Political Economy department He first won a legislative seat in 1946, entering the Assembly of Deputies; he then sat in the Great National Assembly from 1948 to 1975, successively representing the Prahova, Iași and Constanța areas. Bârlădeanu was in the party leadership for nearly fifteen years, sitting on the central committee from 1955 to 1969, and was one of the party's ideologues. An alternate member of the politburo under Gheorghe Gheorghiu-Dej from 1962 to 1965, followed by a stint as full member (March–July 1965), he joined the political executive committee (CPEx) and the permanent presidium at the ninth party congress in July 1965 under Gheorghiu-Dej's new successor, Nicolae Ceaușescu. From 1960 to 1962, he was president of the Romanian Football Federation. As such, he sidelined the national football team from competition, withdrawing it from the 1962 FIFA World Cup qualification on the grounds that it would lose anyway and had no need to participate in capitalist propaganda.

=== Banishment and return to public life ===
He entered into conflict with Elena Ceaușescu as head of the national council for scientific research, which he began heading at the end of 1967, resigning from all his posts in December 1968, although he remained on the central committee and the CPEx until the following August. This forced retirement saw colorless apparatchiks appointed in his stead to supervise scientific and technological research, further solidifying Elena's rise to the apex of political power. With economic experts like him long sidelined, by the late 1970s, the dictator's wife was far more influential than any civil or military official; of her, Bârlădeanu wrote that "hateful vindictiveness, stupidity, nastiness, insensitivity and brazenness" were her "most obvious" negative qualities. In later years, he and Paul Niculescu-Mizil helped create the myth of a "patriotic faction" within the party where a radical break was marked between early Stalinism and post-1960 developments; Bârlădeanu in particular fostered the image of a benign Gheorghiu-Dej in contrast to Ceaușescu. During the two decades after his fall from grace, he ran into trouble with the authorities twice: once in the 1970s for publishing an article in Contemporanul without approval, and once in the 1980s for discussing with Gheorghe Apostol how Ceaușescu might be removed from the leadership. He also encountered difficulties while selling expensive goods, confiscated during the nationalization process, that he had acquired. In March 1989, he was a signatory of the Letter of the Six, terrified of Ceaușescu's approach to the command economy; the regime responded by placing him under house arrest, while accusing him of being a spy and a speculator and removing him from the party.

Following the fall of the regime at the end of that year, he was awarded important posts and honors as an elder statesman of the National Salvation Front (FSN), and as part of its council belonged to a group who had fallen foul of Ceaușescu. Among the positions he held was the Senate Presidency, from June 1990 to October 1992, having been elected in May for a Bucharest seat. While in this office, he spoke in January 1991 in commemoration of Bucharest pogrom and several months later delivered a message for the 50th anniversary of the Iași pogrom, in spite of a widespread climate of anti-Semitism at the time. That year also saw open conflict between him and Prime Minister Petre Roman and the latter's ally Adrian Severin over the speed of price liberalization and economic privatization, with Bârlădeanu, at the forefront of the FSN's more cautious wing, unsuccessfully pushing for a slower pace. Additionally, in 1990–1991, he was co-president of the committee charged with writing a new constitution, and was for a time honorary director of the FSN's newspaper Azi. In 1991, he quit (or was removed from) the FSN and withdrew from politics altogether in 1993. In 1995, eulogizing Corneliu Coposu, he publicly declared that, although the two men belonged to the same generation, it was the latter who had chosen the right path. He died in Bucharest in 1997.

His first wife, whom he married in June 1946, was Russian. She was followed by the actress Marcela Rusu, and then by Mihaela, a researcher at the Academy's Institute of Linguistics. He had a son who emigrated to France prior to 1989 and a daughter. Bârlădeanu‘s awards included Commander of the Order of the Crown (1947) and the Order of the Star of the Romanian People’s Republic, second class (1959).

== Notes ==
Political offices
Preceded by None	President of the Senate of Romania; 1990–1992	Succeeded by Oliviu Gherman
