= First Stoica cabinet =

Romanian government

- 98th Cabinet of Romania

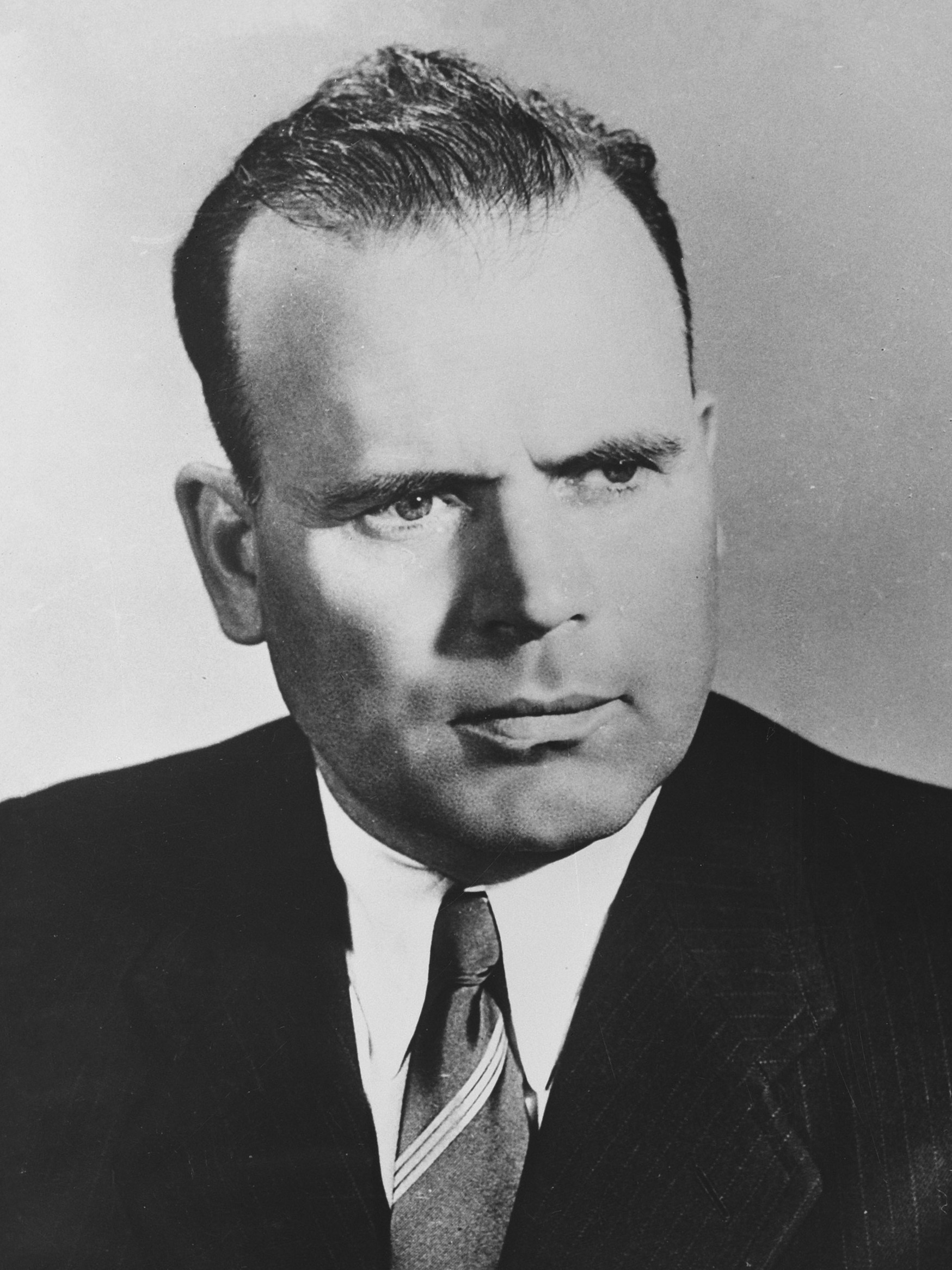
- Date formed: 4 October 1955
- Date dissolved: 19 March 1957

People and organisations
- President of the Presidium of the Great National Assembly: Petru Groza
- President of the Council of Ministers: Chivu Stoica (PCR)
- First Vice President of the Council of Ministers: Emil Bodnăraș (PCR); Petre Borilă (PCR); Alexandru Drăghici (PCR); Miron Constantinescu (PCR)
- No. of ministers: 41
- Total no. of members: 48
- Member party: PCR
- Status in legislature: One-party state

History
- Election: 1952
- Legislature term: 2nd Great National Assembly
- Predecessor: Gheorghiu-Dej II
- Successor: Stoica II

The first Stoica cabinet was the government of Romania from October 4, 1955 to March 19, 1957.

== Changes in the government ==
- January 10, 1956 - The Ministry of Agriculture and Forestry was divided as follows: Ministry of Agriculture, Ministry of Forestry and Ministry of State Farming.
- January 10, 1956 - The Ministry of Wood, Paper and Pulp Industry was reorganized, becoming the Ministry of Wood Industry.
- January 21, 1957 - The Ministry of Health merged with the Ministry of Social Welfare to form the Ministry of Health and Social Welfare.
- January 21, 1957 - The Ministry of Collections was abolished.
- February 19, 1957 - The Ministry of Communal Households and Local Industry was abolished.

== Composition ==
The ministers of the cabinet were as follows:

- President of the Council of Ministers:

- Chivu Stoica (October 4, 1955 – March 19, 1957)

- First Vice Presidents of the Council of Ministers:

- Emil Bodnăraș (October 4, 1955 – March 19, 1957)
- Petre Borilă (October 4, 1955 – March 19, 1957)
- Alexandru Drăghici (October 4, 1955 – March 19, 1957)
- Miron Constantinescu (October 4, 1955 – March 19, 1957)

- Vice Presidents of the Council of Ministers:

- Dumitru Petrescu (October 4, 1955 – May 26, 1956)
- Gheorghe Hossu (26 May 1956 – 19 March 1957)
- Simion Bughici (October 4, 1955 – March 19, 1957)
- Alexandru Moghioroș (October 4, 1955 – March 19, 1957)
- Alexandru Bârlădeanu (October 4, 1955 – March 19, 1957)
- Ștefan Voitec (November 24, 1956 – March 19, 1957)

- Minister of the Interior:

- Pavel Ștefan (October 4, 1955 – March 19, 1957)

- Minister of Foreign Affairs:

- Grigore Preoteasa (October 4, 1955 – March 19, 1957)

- Minister of Justice:

- Gheorghe Diaconescu (October 4, 1955 – March 19, 1957)

- Minister of National Defense:

- Leontin Sălăjan (October 4, 1955 – March 19, 1957)

- Minister of Finance:

- Manea Mănescu (October 4, 1955 – March 19, 1957)

- Minister of the Metallurgy and Machine Construction:

- Gherasim Popa (October 4, 1955 – March 19, 1957)

- Minister of Chemical Industry:

- Mihail Florescu (October 4, 1955 – March 19, 1957)

- Minister of the Petroleum Industry:

- Ion Dumitru (October 4, 1955 – March 19, 1957)

- Minister of Coal:

- Ioan Mineu (October 4, 1955 – March 19, 1957)

- Minister of Electricity and Electrotechnical Industry:

- Gheorghe Cioară (October 4, 1955 – February 19, 1957)
- Nicolae Gheorghiu (19 February – 19 March 1957)

- Minister of Constructions:

- Gheorghe Hossu (4 October 1955 – 10 January 1956)
- Ștefan Bălan (January 10, 1956 – March 19, 1957)

- Minister of the Construction Materials Industry:

- Carol Loncear (October 4, 1955 – March 19, 1957)

- Minister of Light Industry:

- Alexandru Sencovici (October 4, 1955 – March 19, 1957)

- Minister of Agriculture (from January 10, 1956 the ministry was reorganized as the Ministry of Agriculture):

- Constantin Popescu (October 4, 1955 – January 10, 1956)
- Gheorghe Hossu (January 10 – May 26, 1956)
- Marin Stancu (May 26, 1956 – March 19, 1957)

- Minister of Wood, Paper and Pulp Industry (the Ministry was reorganized on January 10, 1956 under the name of the Ministry of Wood Industry):

- Mihai Suder (October 4, 1955 – March 19, 1957)

- Minister of Food Industry:

- Constantin Teodoru (October 4, 1955 – March 19, 1957)

- Minister of State Agricultural Households:

- Bucur Șchiopu (January 10, 1956 – March 19, 1957)

- Minister of communal households and local industry (on February 19, 1957 the ministry was abolished):

- Anton Vlădoiu (October 4, 1955 – March 23, 1956)
- Filip Geltz (March 23, 1956 – February 19, 1957)

- Minister of Forestry:

- Constantin Popescu (January 10, 1956 – March 19, 1957)

- Minister of Collections (on January 21, 1957, the ministry was abolished):

- Mihai Dalea (October 4, 1955 – May 11, 1956)
- Constantin Doncea (May 11, 1956 – January 21, 1957)

- Minister of Internal Trade:

- Ștefan Voitec (October 4, 1955 – November 24, 1956)

- Minister of Foreign Trade:

- Marcel Popescu (October 4, 1955 – November 24, 1956)
- Gheorghe (Gogu) Rădulescu (24 November 1956 – 19 March 1957)

- Minister of Railways:

- Ionel Diaconescu (October 4, 1955 – September 24, 1956)
- Ion Cosma (September 24, 1956 – March 19, 1957)

- Minister of Naval and Air Transport:

- Gheorghe D. Safer (October 4, 1955 – March 19, 1957)

- Minister of Posts and Telecommunications:

- Dumitru Simulescu (October 4, 1955 – March 19, 1957)

- Minister of Social Provisions (on January 21, 1957 the ministry was abolished):

- Octavian Berlogea (October 4, 1955 – January 21, 1957)

- Minister of Health (on January 21, 1957 merged with the Ministry of Social Provisions):

- Voinea Marinescu (October 4, 1955 – January 21, 1957)

- Minister of Health and Social Provisions:

- Voinea Marinescu (January 21 – March 19, 1957)

- Minister of Education:

- Ilie G. Murgulescu (October 4, 1955 – November 24, 1956)
- Miron Constantinescu (November 24, 1956 – March 19, 1957)

- Minister of Culture:

- Constanța Crăciun (October 4, 1955 – March 19, 1957)

- Minister of Religions:

- Petre Constantinescu-Iași (October 4, 1955 – March 19, 1957)

=== Ministers Secretaries of State ===
- President of the State Planning Committee (with the rank of minister):

- Alexandru Bârlădeanu (October 4, 1955 – May 26, 1956)
- Gheorghe Gaston Marin (26 May 1956 – 19 March 1957)

- President of the State Control Commission (with the rank of minister):

- Dumitru Coliu (October 4, 1955 – March 19, 1957)

- President of the State Committee for Architecture and Systematization (with the rank of minister):

- Nicolae Bădescu (October 4, 1955 – March 19, 1957)

== Source ==
- Stelian Neagoe - "History of Romanian governments from the beginning - 1859 to our days - 1995" (Ed. Machiavelli, Bucharest, 1995)
- Rompres

| Preceded by Second Gheorghiu-Dej cabinet | Cabinet of Romania; October 4, 1955 - March 19, 1957 | Succeeded by Second Stoica cabinet |
