= Second Gheorghiu-Dej cabinet =

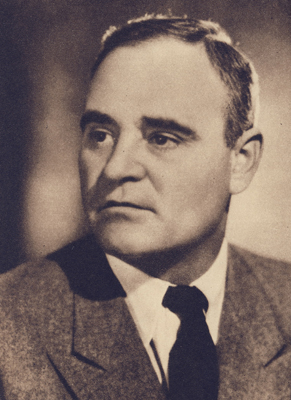
Gheorghe Gheorghiu-Dej

The second Gheorghiu-Dej cabinet was the government of Romania from 28 January 1953 to 4 October 1955.

== Ministries ==
The ministers of the cabinet were as follows:

Portfolio	Minister	Took office	Left office
President of the Council of Ministers	Gheorghe Gheorghiu-Dej	24 January 1953	4 October 1955
First Vice President of the Council of Ministers	Chivu Stoica	20 August 1954	4 October 1955
First Vice President of the Council of Ministers	Iosif Chișinevschi	20 August 1954	4 October 1955
First Vice President of the Council of Ministers	Alexandru Drăghici	20 August 1954	4 October 1955
Vice President of the Council of Ministers	Chivu Stoica	24 January 1953	20 August 1954
Vice President of the Council of Ministers	Emil Bodnăraș	20 August 1954	4 October 1955
Vice President of the Council of Ministers	Iosif Chișinevschi	24 January 1953	20 August 1954
Vice President of the Council of Ministers	Petre Borilă	20 August 1954	4 October 1955
Vice President of the Council of Ministers	Gheorghe Apostol	24 January 1953	21 April 1954
Vice President of the Council of Ministers	Alexandru Moghioroș	21 April 1954	4 October 1955
Vice President of the Council of Ministers	Gheorghe Vidrașcu	24 January 1953	21 April 1954
Vice President of the Council of Ministers	Miron Constantinescu	21 April 1954	4 October 1955
Minister of Interior	Pavel Ștefan	24 January 1953	4 October 1955
Minister of the State Security	Alexandru Drăghici	24 January 1953	4 October 1955
Minister of Foreign Affairs	Simion Bughici	24 January 1953	4 October 1955
Minister of Justice	Anton Tatu Jianu	24 January 1953	31 May 1954
Minister of Justice	Gheorghe Diaconescu	31 May 1954	4 October 1955
Minister of Armed Forces	Emil Bodnăraș	24 January 1953	4 October 1955
Minister of Finance	Dumitru Petrescu	24 January 1953	4 October 1955
Minister of Metallurgical Industry	Carol Loncear	24 January 1953	17 October 1953
Minister of Metallurgical Industry	Chivu Stoica	17 October 1953	4 October 1955
Minister of Chemical Industry	Mihail Florescu	24 January 1953	4 October 1955
Minister of Petroleum Industry	Ion Dumitru	24 January 1953	4 October 1955
Minister of Coal Industry	Eugen Alexandru Matyas	24 January 1953	4 April 1955
Minister of Coal Industry	Ioan Mineu	4 April 1955	4 October 1955
Minister of Electric Energy and Electrotechnical Industry	Gheorghe Gaston Marin	24 January 1953	18 May 1954
Minister of Electric Energy and Electrotechnical Industry	Gheorghe Cioară	18 May 1954	4 October 1955
Minister of Construction and Building Materials Industry (Note: On 8 October 1954, ministry was split into the Ministry of Construction and the Ministry of Building Materials Industry.)	Gheorghe Roșu	24 January 1953	8 October 1954
Minister of Construction	Gheorghe Hossu	8 October 1954	4 October 1955
Minister of Building Materials Industry	Carol Loncear	8 October 1954	4 October 1955
Minister of Light Industry	Alexandru Sencovici	24 January 1953	4 October 1955
Minister of Agriculture (Note: From 5 November 1953, Minister of Agriculture and Forestry.)	Constantin Prisnea	24 January 1953	5 November 1953
Minister of Agriculture	Gheorghe Apostol	5 November 1953	18 May 1954
Minister of Agriculture	Constantin Popescu	18 May 1954	4 October 1955
Minister of Wood, Paper and Cellulose Industries	Mihai Suder	24 January 1953	4 October 1955
Minister of Food Industry	Dumitru Diaconescu	24 January 1953	17 October 1953
Minister of Food Industry	Petre Borilă	17 October 1953	4 October 1955
Minister of Meat, Fish, and Milk Industries (Note: Ministry abolished on 17 October 1953. Departments merged into the Ministry of Food Industry.)	Pascu Ștefănescu	24 January 1953	17 October 1953
Minister of State Agricultural Farms (Note: Ministry abolished on 5 November 1953.)	Ion Vidrașcu	24 January 1953	5 November 1953
Minister of Communal Farms and Local Industry	Anton Vlădoiu	24 January 1953	4 October 1955
Minister of Forestry (Note: Ministry abolished on 5 November 1953.)	Constantin Popescu	24 January 1953	5 November 1953
Minister of Collectivisation	Mihai Dalea	15 February 1955	4 October 1955
Minister of Internal Trade	Vasile Malinschi	24 January 1953	16 February 1954
Minister of Internal Trade	Mircea Oprișan	16 February 1954	4 October 1955
Minister of Foreign Trade	Alexandru Bârlădeanu	24 January 1953	18 May 1954
Minister of Foreign Trade	Marcel Popescu	18 May 1954	4 October 1955
Minister of Railways	Ionel Diaconescu	24 January 1953	4 October 1955
Minister of Shipping and Air Transport	Gheorghe D. Safer	24 January 1953	4 October 1955
Minister of Posts and Telecommunications	Dumitru Simulescu	24 January 1953	4 October 1955
Minister of Social Provisions	Stela Enescu	24 January 1953	10 June 1954
Minister of Social Provisions	Octavian Berlogea	10 June 1954	4 October 1955
Minister of Health	Octavian Berlogea	24 January 1953	10 June 1954
Minister of Health	Voinea Marinescu	10 June 1954	4 October 1955
Minister of Public Teaching (Note: On 6 October 1953, the Ministry merged with the Ministry of Higher Teaching to form the Ministry of Teaching.)	Ion Nistor	24 January 1953	6 October 1953
Minister of Higher Teaching (Note: On 6 October 1953, the Ministry merged with the Ministry of Public Teaching to form the Ministry of Teaching.)	Ilie G. Murgulescu	24 January 1953	6 October 1953
Minister of Teaching (Note: Ministry re-established on 6 October 1953.)	Ilie G. Murgulescu	6 October 1953	4 October 1955
Minister of Culture (Note: Ministry re-established on 30 November 1953.)	Constanța Crăciun	30 November 1953	4 October 1955
Minister of Religious Affairs	Petre Constantinescu-Iași	24 January 1953	4 October 1955

== Ministry-level Committees ==
Portfolio	Minister	Took office	Left office
President of the State Planning Commission	Miron Constantinescu	24 January 1953	4 October 1955
President of the State Control Commission	Petre Borilă	24 January 1953	17 October 1953
President of the State Control Commission	Mihai Gavriliuc	17 October 1953	4 April 1955
President of the State Control Commission	Dumitru Coliu	4 April 1955	4 October 1955
President of the State Supply Commission	Emil Stanciu	24 January 1953	30 November 1953
President of the Collectivisation of Agricultural Products Commission	Ion Olteanu	24 January 1953	15 February 1955
President of the Collectivisation of Agricultural Products Commission	Mihai Dalea	15 February 1955	4 October 1955
President of the Film Commission	Nicolae Bellu	24 January 1953	30 November 1953
President of the Art Commission	Nicolae Popescu-Doreanu	24 January 1953	30 November 1953
President of the Architecture and Systematization Commission	Nicolae Bădescu	24 January 1953	4 October 1955

== Notes ==
Preceded by First Gheorghiu-Dej cabinet	Cabinet of Romania; 28 January 1953 - 4 October 1955	Succeeded by First Stoica cabinet
