= Second Stoica cabinet =

Romanian government

- 99th Cabinet of Romania

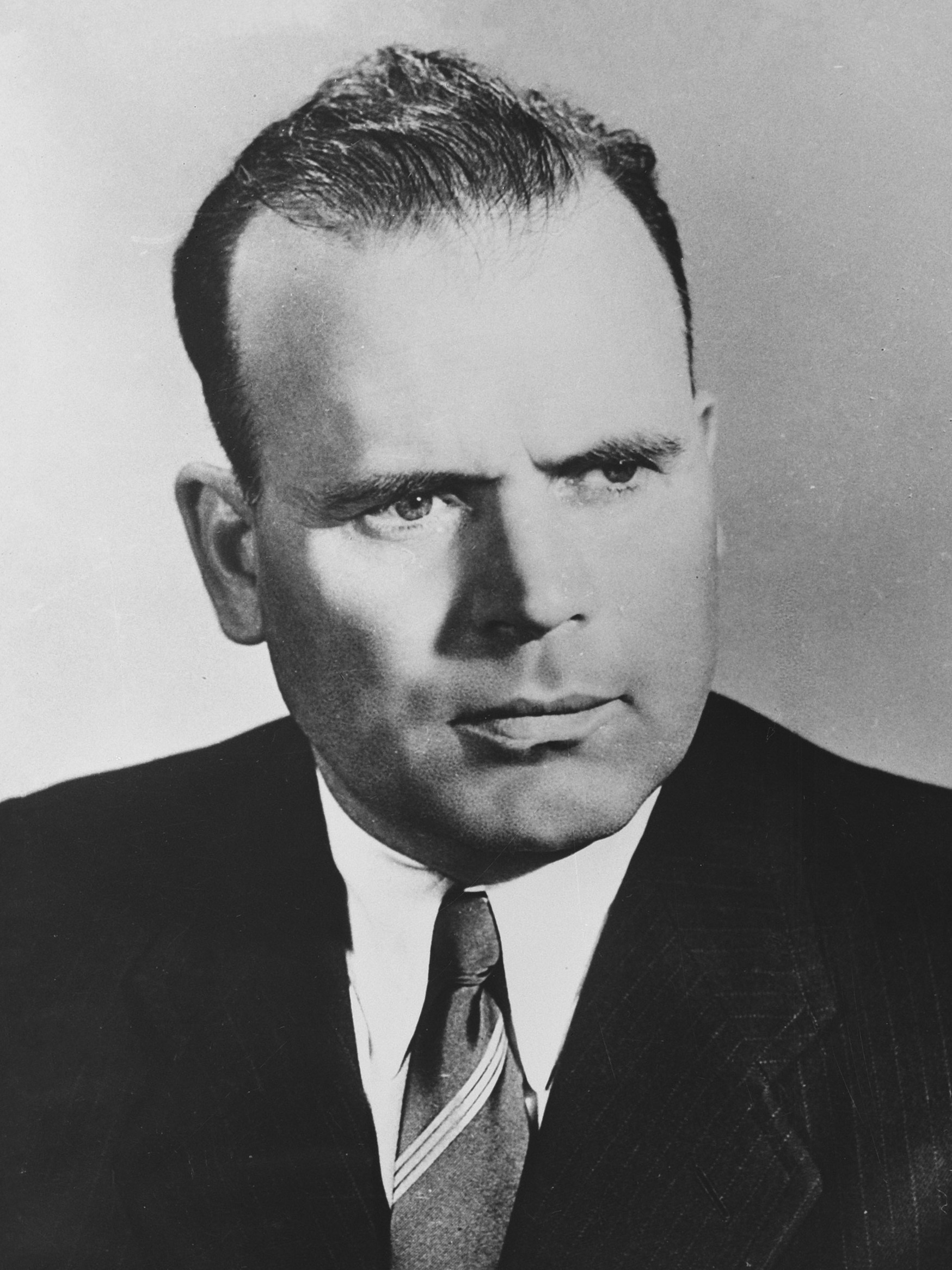
- Date formed: 20 March 1957
- Date dissolved: 20 March 1961

People and organisations
- President of the Presidium of the Great National Assembly: Petru Groza until January 7, 1958, Ion Gheorghe Maurer from January 10, 1958
- President of the Council of Ministers: Chivu Stoica (PCR)
- Vice President of the Council of Ministers: Emil Bodnăraș (PCR); Petre Borilă (PCR); Miron Constantinescu (PCR); Gherasim Popa (PCR); Alexandru Moghioroș (PCR); Alexandru Bârlădeanu (PCR); Ștefan Voitec (PCR); Athanase Joja (PCR)
- No. of ministers: 41
- Total no. of members: 34
- Member party: PCR
- Status in legislature: One-party state

History
- Election: 1957
- Legislature term: 3rd Great National Assembly
- Predecessor: Stoica I
- Successor: Maurer I

The second Stoica cabinet was the government of Romania from March 20, 1957 to March 20, 1961.

== Changes in the government ==
- December 5, 1958 - The Ministry of Mines was abolished, becoming a department within the Ministry of Heavy Industry.
- May 4, 1959 - The State Committee for Construction, Architecture, and Systematization was established.

== Composition ==
The ministers of the cabinet were as follows:

- President of the Council of Ministers:

- Chivu Stoica (March 20, 1957 – March 20, 1961)

- Vice Presidents of the Council of Ministers:

- Emil Bodnăraș (March 20, 1957 – March 20, 1961)
- Petre Borilă (March 20, 1957 – March 20, 1961)
- Miron Constantinescu (March 20, 1957 – July 15, 1957)
- Gherasim Popa (October 10, 1957 – March 20, 1961)
- Alexandru Moghioroș (March 20, 1957 – March 20, 1961)
- Alexandru Bârlădeanu (March 20, 1957 – March 20, 1961)
- Ștefan Voitec (March 20, 1957 – March 20, 1961)
- Athanase Joja (February 8, 1958 – March 20, 1961)

- Minister of the Interior:

- Alexandru Drăghici (March 20, 1957 – March 20, 1961)

- Minister of Foreign Affairs:

- Grigore Preoteasa (March 20, 1957 – July 15, 1957)
- Ion Gheorghe Maurer (July 15, 1957 – January 23, 1958)
- Avram Bunaciu (January 23, 1958 – March 20, 1961)

- Minister of Justice:

- Gheorghe Diaconescu (March 20, 1957 – December 31, 1957)
- Avram Bunaciu (December 31, 1957 – January 23, 1958)
- Gheorghe Diaconescu (January 23, 1958 – March 20, 1961)

- Minister of National Defense:

- Leontin Sălăjan (March 20, 1957 – March 20, 1961)

- Minister of Finance:

- Aurel Vijoli (March 20, 1957 – March 20, 1961)

- Minister of Heavy Industry:

- Gherasim Popa (March 20, 1957 – April 27, 1959)
- Carol Loncear (April 27, 1959 – July 1, 1960)
- Constantin Tuzu (July 1, 1960 – March 20, 1961)

- Minister of Mines:

- Ioan Mineu (March 20, 1957 – March 20, 1961)

- Minister of Petroleum and Chemistry:

- Mihail Florescu (March 20, 1957 – March 20, 1961)

- Minister of Consumer Goods Industry:

- Ștefan Voitec (March 20, 1957 – April 27, 1959)
- Alexandru Sencovici (April 27, 1959 – March 20, 1961)

- Minister of Construction and Building Materials (on May 4, 1959, the ministry was abolished):

- Gheorghe Hossu (March 20, 1957 – December 5, 1958)
- Mihai Suder (December 5, 1958 – May 4, 1959)

- Minister of Agriculture and Forestry:

- Ion Cosma (March 20, 1957 – March 20, 1961)

- Minister of Forestry Economics:

- Mihai Suder (December 17, 1959 – March 20, 1961)

- Minister of Trade:

- Marcel Popescu (March 20, 1957 – August 17, 1959)
- Gheorghe (Gogu) Rădulescu (August 17, 1959 – March 20, 1961)

- Minister of Transport and Telecommunications:

- Emil Bodnăraș (March 20, 1957 – April 27, 1959)
- Dumitru Simulescu (April 27, 1959 – March 20, 1961)

- Minister of Health and Social Provisions:

- Voinea Marinescu (March 20, 1957 – March 20, 1961)

- Minister of Education:

- Miron Constantinescu (March 20, 1957 – July 15, 1957)
- Athanase Joja (July 15, 1957 – January 16, 1960)
- Ilie G. Murgulescu (January 16, 1960 – March 20, 1961)

=== Minister Secretaries of State ===
- President of the State Planning Committee (with ministerial rank):

- Gheorghe Gaston Marin (March 20, 1957 – March 20, 1961)

- President of the State Control Commission (with ministerial rank):

- Dumitru Coliu (March 20, 1957 – March 20, 1961)

- President of the Committee for the Issues of Local Organs of State Administration (with ministerial rank):

- Petre Costache (March 20, 1957 – May 4, 1959)

- President of the State Waters Committee (with ministerial rank):

- Ion S. Bernacki (March 20, 1957 – December 5, 1958)
- Gheorghe Hossu (December 5, 1958 – March 20, 1961)

- Ceremonial Head of State (with ambassadorial rank):

- Dionisie Ionescu (February 8, 1958 – March 20, 1961)

== Sources ==
- (in Romanian) Final Report of the Presidential Commission for the Study of the Communist Dictatorship in Romania
- Luminița Banu, Florian Banu, "Securitatea, bancherul și vânătoarea — o acțiune de 'lobby cinegetic' în anii '70", in Caietele CNSAS, Vol. VIII, Issue 1, 2015, pp. 213–266.
- Florica Dobre, Liviu Marius Bejenaru, Clara Cosmineanu-Mareș, Monica Grigore, Alina Ilinca, Oana Ionel, Nicoleta Ionescu-Gură, Elisabeta Neagoe-Pleșa, Liviu Pleșa, Membrii C.C. al P.C.R. (1945–1989). Dicționar. Bucharest: Editura Enciclopedică, 2004. ISBN 973-45-0486-X
- Horia Dumitrescu, "Ștefan Voitec și Țara Vrancei", in Cronica Vrancei, Vol. I, 2000, pp. 313–330.
- (in Romanian) Constantin Grigore and Miliana Șerbu, Miniștrii de interne (1862–2007) , Editura Ministerului Internelor și Reformei Administrative, Bucharest, 2007. ISBN 978-97374-504-8-7
- Stelian Neagoe - "History of Romanian governments from the beginning - 1859 to our days - 1995" (Ed. Machiavelli, Bucharest, 1995)
- Rompres
- Vladimir Tismăneanu, Stalinism for All Seasons: A Political History of Romanian Communism, University of California Press, 2003, ISBN 0-52-023747-1

Preceded by First Stoica cabinet	Cabinet of Romania; March 20, 1957 - March 20, 1961	Succeeded by First Maurer cabinet
