= First Maurer cabinet =

Romanian government

- 100th Cabinet of Romania

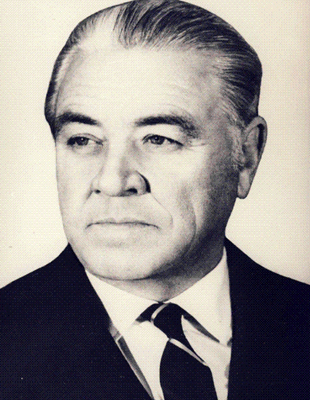
- Date formed: 21 March 1961
- Date dissolved: 18 March 1965

People and organisations
- President of the State Council: Gheorghe Gheorghiu-Dej
- President of the Council of Ministers: Ion Gheorghe Maurer (PCR)
- First Vice President of the Council of Ministers: Gheorghe Apostol (PCR)
- No. of ministers: 41
- Total no. of members: 34
- Member party: PCR
- Status in legislature: One-party state

History
- Election: 1961
- Legislature term: 4th Great National Assembly
- Predecessor: Stoica II
- Successor: Maurer II

The first Maurer cabinet was the government of Romania from 21 March 1961 to 18 March 1965.

== Changes in the government ==
- 27 February 1962 - The Ministry of Construction Industry was established.
- 30 April 1962 - The Ministry of Commerce was reorganized, creating the Ministry of Internal Commerce and the Ministry of External Commerce.
- 31 May 1962 - The Ministry of Agriculture was abolished, and the Superior Council of Agriculture was established.
- 9 June 1962 - The Ministry of Education and Culture was reorganized, creating the Ministry of Education and the State Committee for Culture and Arts.
- 31 October 1963 - The Ministry of Metallurgy and Machine Construction was reorganized, establishing the Ministry of Metallurgical Industry and the Ministry of Machine Construction.

== Composition ==
The ministers of the cabinet were as follows:

- President of the Council of Ministers:

- Ion Gheorghe Maurer (21 March 1961 – 18 March 1965)

- First Vice President of the Council of Ministers:

- Gheorghe Apostol (21 March 1961 – 18 March 1965)

- Vice Presidents of the Council of Ministers:

- Emil Bodnăraș (21 March 1961 – 18 March 1965)
- Petre Borilă (21 March 1961 – 18 March 1965)
- Alexandru Drăghici (21 March 1961 – 18 March 1965)
- Alexandru Moghioroș (21 March 1961 – 18 March 1965)
- Alexandru Bârlădeanu (21 March 1961 – 18 March 1965)
- Gheorghe Gaston Marin (29 September 1962 – 18 March 1965)
- Gheorghe (Gogu) Rădulescu (31 October 1963 – 18 March 1965)
- Constantin Tuzu (31 October 1963 – 18 March 1965)

- Minister of the Interior:

- Alexandru Drăghici (21 March 1961 – 18 March 1965)

- Minister of Foreign Affairs:

- Corneliu Mănescu (21 March 1961 – 18 March 1965)

- Minister of Justice:

- Ioan Constant Manoliu (21 March 1961 – 18 March 1965)

- Minister of National Defense:

- Leontin Sălăjan (21 March 1961 – 18 March 1965)

- Minister of Finance:

- Aurel Vijoli (21 March 1961 – 18 March 1965)

- Minister of Metallurgy and Machine Construction (on 31 October 1963, the ministry was reorganized, establishing the Ministry of Metallurgical Industry and the Ministry of Machine Construction):

- Constantin Tuzu (21 March 1961 – 31 October 1963)

- Minister of Metallurgical Industry:

- Ion Marinescu (31 October 1963 – 18 March 1965)

- Minister of Machine Construction:

- Gheorghe Rădoi (31 October 1963 – 18 March 1965)

- Minister of Mines and Electric Power:

- Bujor Almășan (21 March 1961 – 18 March 1965)

- Minister of Petroleum and Chemical Industry:

- Mihail Florescu (21 March 1961 – 18 March 1965)

- Minister of Construction Industry:

- Dumitru Mosora (27 February 1962 – 18 March 1965)

- Minister of Light Industry:

- Alexandru Sencovici (21 March 1961 – 18 March 1965)

- Minister of Agriculture:

- Ion Cosma (21 March 1961 – 30 April 1962)
- Dumitru Diaconescu (30 April – 31 May 1962)

- President of the Superior Council of Agriculture (with ministerial rank):

- Mihai Dalea (31 May 1962 – 18 March 1965)

- Minister of Food Industry:

- János Fazekas (21 March 1961 – 18 March 1965)

- Minister of Forestry Economics:

- Mihai Suder (21 March 1961 – 18 March 1965)

- Minister of Commerce (on 30 April 1962, the ministry was divided into the Ministry of External Commerce and the Ministry of Internal Commerce):

- Gheorghe (Gogu) Rădulescu (21 March 1961 – 30 April 1962)

- Minister of External Commerce:

- Gheorghe (Gogu) Rădulescu (30 April 1962 – 31 October 1963)
- Victor Ionescu (31 October 1963 – 22 December 1964)
- Mihail Petri (22 December 1964 – 18 March 1965)

- Minister of Internal Commerce:

- Mihail Levente (30 April 1962 – 18 March 1965)

- Minister of Transport and Telecommunications:

- Dumitru Simulescu (21 March 1961 – 18 March 1965)

- Minister of Health and Social Provisions:

- Voinea Marinescu (21 March 1961 – 18 March 1965)

- Minister of Education and Culture (from 9 June 1962, only Minister of Education):

- Ilie G. Murgulescu (21 March 1961 – 16 April 1963)
- Ștefan Bălan (16 April 1963 – 18 March 1965)

=== Minister Secretaries of State ===
- President of the State Committee for Culture and Arts (with ministerial rank):

- Constanța Crăciun (9 June 1962 – 18 March 1965)

- President of the State Planning Committee (with ministerial rank):

- Gheorghe Gaston Marin (21 March 1961 – 18 March 1965)

- President of the Committee for Local Administration Issues (with ministerial rank):

- Mihai Gere (10 December 1961 – 18 March 1965)

== Sources ==
- (in Romanian) Final Report of the Presidential Commission for the Study of the Communist Dictatorship in Romania
- Luminița Banu, Florian Banu, "Securitatea, bancherul și vânătoarea — o acțiune de 'lobby cinegetic' în anii '70", in Caietele CNSAS, Vol. VIII, Issue 1, 2015, pp. 213–266.
- Florica Dobre, Liviu Marius Bejenaru, Clara Cosmineanu-Mareș, Monica Grigore, Alina Ilinca, Oana Ionel, Nicoleta Ionescu-Gură, Elisabeta Neagoe-Pleșa, Liviu Pleșa, Membrii C.C. al P.C.R. (1945–1989). Dicționar. Bucharest: Editura Enciclopedică, 2004. ISBN 973-45-0486-X
- Horia Dumitrescu, "Ștefan Voitec și Țara Vrancei", in Cronica Vrancei, Vol. I, 2000, pp. 313–330.
- (in Romanian) Constantin Grigore and Miliana Șerbu, Miniștrii de interne (1862–2007) , Editura Ministerului Internelor și Reformei Administrative, Bucharest, 2007. ISBN 978-97374-504-8-7
- Stelian Neagoe - "History of Romanian governments from the beginning - 1859 to our days - 1995" (Ed. Machiavelli, Bucharest, 1995)
- Rompres
- Vladimir Tismăneanu, Stalinism for All Seasons: A Political History of Romanian Communism, University of California Press, 2003, ISBN 0-52-023747-1

| Preceded by Second Stoica cabinet | Cabinet of Romania; 21 March 1961 - 18 March 1965 | Succeeded by Second Maurer cabinet |
