= First Gheorghiu-Dej cabinet =

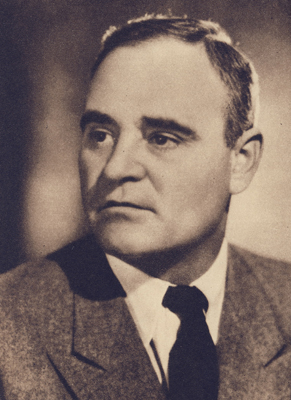
Gheorghe Gheorghiu-Dej

The first Gheorghiu-Dej cabinet was the government of Romania from 2 June 1952 to 24 January 1953.

== Ministries ==
The ministers of the cabinet were as follows:

Portfolio	Minister	Took office	Left office
President of the Council of Ministers	Gheorghe Gheorghiu-Dej	2 June 1952	24 January 1953
Vice President of the Council of Ministers	Ana Pauker	2 June 1952	24 November 1952
Vice President of the Council of Ministers	Chivu Stoica	2 June 1952	24 January 1953
Vice President of the Council of Ministers	Iosif Chișinevschi	2 June 1952	24 January 1953
Vice President of the Council of Ministers	Gheorghe Apostol	2 June 1952	24 January 1953
Minister of Interior	Alexandru Drăghici	2 June 1952	20 September 1952
Minister of Interior	Pavel Ștefan	20 September 1952	24 January 1953
Minister of the State Security (Note: Established through the reorganization of the Ministry of Interior.)	Alexandru Drăghici	20 September 1952	24 January 1953
Minister of Foreign Affairs	Ana Pauker	2 June 1952	10 July 1952
Minister of Foreign Affairs	Simion Bughici	10 July 1952	24 January 1953
Minister of Justice	Stelian Nițulescu	2 June 1952	24 January 1953
Minister of National Defense	Emil Bodnăraș	2 June 1952	24 January 1953
Minister of Finance	Dumitru Petrescu	2 June 1952	24 January 1953
Minister of Metallurgical and Chemical Industries	Carol Loncear	2 June 1952	24 January 1953
Minister of Coal Industry, Mines, and Petroleum (Note: On 26 August 1952, the ministry was reorganized into the Ministry of Petroleum and Natural Gas Industry and the Ministry of Coal.)	Constantin Mateescu	2 June 1952	26 August 1952
Minister of Petroleum and Natural Gas Industry (Note: Ministry established on 26 August 1952.)	Constantin Mateescu	26 August 1952	24 January 1953
Minister of Coal (Note: Ministry established on 26 August 1952.)	Mihai Suder	26 August 1952	24 January 1953
Minister of Electric Energy	Gheorghe Gaston Marin	2 June 1952	24 January 1953
Minister of Light Industry	Alexandru Sencovici	2 June 1952	24 January 1953
Minister of Agriculture	Constantin Prisnea	2 June 1952	24 January 1953
Minister of Wood, Paper and Cellulose Industries	Mihai Suder	2 June 1952	24 January 1953
Minister of Food Industry	Dumitru Diaconescu (primar)	2 June 1952	24 January 1953
Minister of Meat, Fish, and Milk Industries	Pascu Ștefănescu	5 October 1952	24 January 1953
Minister of State Agricultural Farms	Ion Vidrașcu	13 July 1952	24 January 1953
Minister of Forestry	Constantin Popescu	24 November 1952	24 January 1953
Minister of Internal Trade	Vasile Malinschi	2 June 1952	24 January 1953
Minister of Transport	Augustin Alexa	2 June 1952	24 January 1953
Minister of Posts and Telecommunications	Valter Roman	2 June 1952	24 January 1953
Minister of Social Provisions	Lothar Rădăceanu	2 June 1952	28 July 1952
Minister of Social Provisions	Pericle Negescu	28 July 1952	24 January 1953
Minister of Health	Vasile Mârza	2 June 1952	22 August 1952
Minister of Health	Octavian Berlogea	22 August 1952	24 January 1953
Minister of Teaching	Nicolae Popescu-Doreanu	2 June 1952	26 September 1952
Minister of Teaching	Ion Nistor	26 September 1952	24 January 1953
Minister of Religious Affairs	Vasile Pogăceanu	2 June 1952	24 January 1953

== Ministry-level Committees ==
Portfolio	Minister	Took office	Left office
President of the State Control Commission	Ion Vidrașcu	2 June 1952	13 July 1952
President of the State Control Commission	Petre Borilă	13 July 1952	24 January 1953
President of the Arts Commission	Eduard Mezincescu	2 June 1952	26 September 1952
President of the Arts Commission	Nicolae Popescu-Doreanu	26 September 1952	24 January 1953
President of the State Supply Commission	Emil Stanciu	2 June 1952	24 January 1953
President of the Architecture and Construction Commission	Nicolae Bădescu	15 December 1952	24 January 1953

== Notes ==
Preceded by Fourth Groza cabinet	Cabinet of Romania; 2 June 1952 - 28 January 1953	Succeeded by Second Gheorghiu-Dej cabinet
