= Ion Vincze =

Romanian politician and diplomat

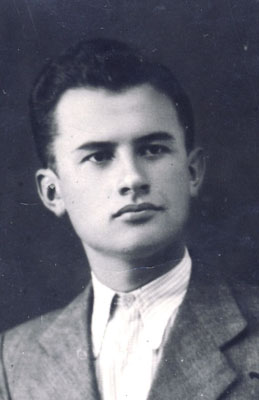

President of the Great National Assembly
- In office 5 April 1951 – 26 March 1952
- Preceded by: Gheorghe Apostol
- Succeeded by: Gheorghe Apostol

Personal details
- Born: Vincze János; 1 September 1910 Lipova, Arad County, Austria-Hungary
- Died: 1996 (aged 85–86) Bucharest, Romania
- Party: Communist Party of Romania
- Spouse: Constanța Crăciun

Ion Vincze (born Vincze János and also called Ion or Ioan Vințe; 1 September 1910 – 1996) was a Romanian communist politician and diplomat. An activist of the Romanian Communist Party (PCR), he was married to Constanța Crăciun, herself a prominent member of the party.

== Biography ==
Born to an ethnic Hungarian family in Lipova, Arad County (then Lippa, Austria-Hungary), he became a member of the Union of Communist Youth in 1930 and of the then-outlawed PCR the following year. An accountant by profession, he attended Școala Superioară de Comerț and Academia Comercială din Cluj. In 1935, he was briefly imprisoned for his activities in support of the PCR.

During World War II, Vincze was in Bucharest, becoming involved in activities against the fascist regime of Ion Antonescu (see Romania during World War II). By then, he was already in a relationship with Constanța Crăciun, and allegations later surfaced that she was unsuccessfully courted by the PCR general secretary, Ștefan Foriș.

On 19 November 1942, a military tribunal in the city condemned him to hard labour for life, having found that

"He was part of the central leadership of the Communist Party of Romania, being tasked with the indoctrination of the capital's young people. He was ordered by the party to procure false identity cards for members of the Communist Party who were to remain in Romania clandestinely. He took part in conspiratorial sessions. He recruited and instructed new members of the communist movement. He received and spread communist propaganda materials and gave instructions regarding the organisation of a Communist Youth of Romania. He refused to declare to us his place of residence, which indicates that in that place there was to be found an important stock of materials, instructions, and names of important persons who form part of the leadership of the Communist Movement."

Vincze was held in Caransebeș Prison, while his lover Crăciun was serving time in Văcărești Prison. Petre Pandrea, a PCR activist who was not arrested, visited him and Crăciun, and later recounted that both detainees had been bastinadoed by the authorities during interrogations. Pandrea also left detail on the couple's wedding in custody, indicating that he and his acquaintance, the Roman Catholic cleric Vladimir Ghika, were their godparents. Later in their life, both Ghika and Pandrea were to be incarcerated by the Romanian communist regime. In reference to this, Pandrea noted:

"I'm not sorry that I and Monsignor Vladimir Gh[i]ka have later been jailed in the prisons set up by these fiancées and grooms [...]. Gratitude is a rare flower. I have forgiven them and I do not forget."

Released after the coup of August 1944, Vincze held a number of positions in the PCR (which soon after became the Romanian Workers' Party, PMR). His name came up in 1944–1946, when Gheorghe Gheorghiu-Dej and his inner-PCR faction succeeded in toppling, kidnapping, and ultimately killing their rival Foriș. Among the informal charges brought against Foriș was his alleged attempt to seduce Crăciun during the war years, when she considered herself engaged to Vincze, and of having thus caused her a nervous breakdown which, it was argued, had facilitated her capture by the authorities.

During the period, Vincze was close to the Ana Pauker-Vasile Luca-Teohari Georgescu faction, which competed with Gheorghiu-Dej's grouping. According to politician Gyárfás Kurkó, Vincze and Luca secretly oversaw the absorption of smaller Hungarian groups into the new Hungarian People's Union, a mass organisation which was to function as a close associate of the PMR. On 5 October 1945, he and Luca, together with other communist activists, attended a meeting with representatives of various PCR affiliates, including representatives of the Jewish community. On this occasion, various party activists issued verbal attacks against the main Jewish anti-communist currents — the moderates led by Wilhelm Filderman and the Zionists represented by A. L. Zissu.

Ion Vincze was elected to the Assembly of Deputies in the 1946 election for the Arad electoral district, as a representative of the PCR-led Bloc of Democratic Parties, and served there until 1948. One of his fellow representatives for Arad County was the prominent PCR member Lucrețiu Pătrășcanu. According to Anton Rațiu and Nicolae Betea, two of Pătrășcanu's collaborators, the results in that constituency were forged by a group of 40 people (including Belu Zilber and Anton Golopenția). They stated that the president of the county electoral commission collected the votes from local stations and was required to read them aloud — irrespective of the option expressed, he called out the names of the Bloc's candidates. Nicolae Betea also indicated that the overall results for the Bloc of Democratic Parties in Arad County, officially recorded at 58%, were closer to 20%.

A supplementary member of the PMR Central Committee from 24 February 1948 to 28 December 1955, he was Minister of Forestry in the Petru Groza cabinet, from 14 April 1948 to 23 November 1949. He was subsequently appointed Romania's Ambassador to the People's Republic of Hungary, at a time when the Hungarian communist politician László Rajk was being purged by his rival Mátyás Rákosi.

According to journalist Pál Bodor, Vincze organized secret meetings between Rákosi and the emerging Romanian leader, Gheorghiu-Dej, which took place in Romania's Bihor County. As a result of these, Gheorghiu-Dej and Rákosi agreed that the Romanian leadership was to arrest and prosecute various ethnic Hungarians who were charged with having supported Rajk's policies. Among these were Gyàrfás Kurkó; Áron Márton, the Roman Catholic Bishop of Alba Iulia; the urban planner György Sebestyén; and the academics József Méliusz, Lajos Csögör and Edgár Balogh. Pál Bodor believes that Vincze may have played a personal part in the purge.

Vincze returned to Romania soon after, and was Minister of Food Industry from 23 November 1949 to 15 December 1950. He was elected as a deputy to the Great National Assembly for the Timișoara-Nord seat in Timișoara Region, and served in that body from 1952 to 1957. In late May 1952, when Luca's fall from power signaled his group's defeat by Gheorghe Gheorghiu-Dej and his partisans, Vincze was noted for abruptly ending his association with Pauker. With Alexandru Moghioroș, Iosif Rangheț, Gheorghe Stoica, and others, he attacked Luca's policies in public, leading to his demotion and subsequent arrest.

He became deputy minister at the Ministry of Internal Affairs after 28 May 1952, under Premiers Groza and Gheorghiu-Dej. Promoted to the rank of Major General (general-maior) in the Romanian Armed Forces in June 1952, he also served as chief of the Administrative Section of the Central Committee of the Romanian Workers' Party until 24 January 1956.

Ion Vincze was vice-president of the Party Control Commission between 28 December 1955 and 24 July 1965. At the time, the body was led by Dumitru Coliu, who, together with Vincze, engineered a series of inner-PMR inquiries and investigations that relied on denunciations. This came in the wake of the Hungarian Revolution of 1956, after criticism of Gheorghiu-Dej had been voiced at home (notably, by Miron Constantinescu and Iosif Chișinevschi). During that period, Coliu, Vincze, Petre Borilă and Gheorghe Stoica ordered the Securitate to carry out arrests and organise repressive actions. Alongside Gheorghe Apostol, Constantin Pîrvulescu, Moghioroș and Borilă, Vincze was Gheorghiu-Dej's emissary during renewed discussions with Pauker, when they attempted to make her admit that she was guilty of "deviationism".

In 1968, when the new leadership around Nicolae Ceaușescu offered concessions to ethnic Hungarian intellectuals, it created a Council of Working People of Magyar Nationality, of which Vincze was named vice-president. Upon selection, he reportedly announced to the community that he was "returning to the womb".

Vincze was also vice-president of the Central Party College from 24 July 1965 to 12 August 1969 and a member of the National Council of Romanian Radio and Television from 8 March 1971. He died in Bucharest.
