= Kishinevsky =

Kishinevsky (also Kyshynivskyi, Kishinevski, etc.) is a Bessarabian Jewish toponymic surname. Its meaning in Russian language is "somebody from Chișinău" (from the Russian spelling of the place name Kishinev/Kishinyov (Кишинёв); now the place is the capital of Moldova). Its Romanian-language spelling is Chișinevschi.

- Aleksandr Kishinevsky (born 1954), Russian footballer and coach
- Iosif Chișinevschi (1905-1963), Jewish Romanian communist
- Liuba Chișinevschi (1911–1981), Romanian communist activist
- Mark Kishinevsky (1917-1993), Jewish Romanian and Soviet chemist
- Solomon Kishinevsky (1862-1942), Jewish Ukrainian and Soviet painter and painting educator

== See also ==
- Kishinyovsky Uyezd
