= Ionel Jora =

Romanian communist and Securitate officer

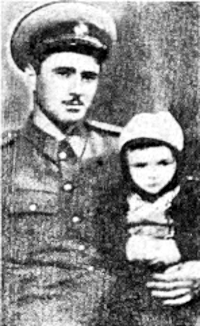
- Photograph of Ionel Jora with his son
- Born: June 20, 1921; Galați, Romania
- Died: June 5, 1950 (aged 28)
- Buried: Galați, Romania
- Allegiance: Romania
- Branch: General Directorate for the Security of the People
- Service years: 1948–1950
- Rank: Lieutenant
- Children: Miron Jora

Ioan "Ionel" Jora (20 June 1921 – 5 June 1950) was a Romanian communist activist and officer of the Securitate, Romania's secret police, who was assassinated by the son of a suspect he had apprehended.

== Biography ==
Ionel Jora was the third child of a working-class family from the port of Galați; his parents, Ion and Tudorița, were under the surveillance of Siguranța, Romania's secret police before World War II, for their communist convictions. By fourteen, he was already working as a shop boy, and joined the Galați shipyard as an apprentice in 1936. After participating in industrial action together with older workers, he came under pressure from his employer and the Siguranța, being forced to leave the shipyards for the Gallus paint factory in 1938. Soon after, in 1940, he was recruited into the outlawed Union of Communist Youth. By October 1940, together with his brother Alexandru, Jora was part of a communist cell constituted at the shipyard. The cell held several clandestine meetings and on the night 12–13 December 1940 organised the distribution of manifestos directed at the shipyard employees, workers of the port and the general populace. The latter manifestos condemned the indifference of the authorities towards the victims of the 1940 Vrancea earthquake and called on the inhabitants to protest the presence of German troops in the city. During this period, Jora met future communist leader Miron Constantinescu, who had been sent to the city to coordinate the communist cells in the region. One of the meetings took place in a room rented by Jora, as he had left home due to disagreements with his father. The same room was also used for preparing propaganda work and organising the cell.

In the early days of 1941, as Romania's dictator Ion Antonescu was aligning the country closer with Nazi Germany, Jora was involved in spreading anti-fascist flyers in his native town. After one member of the cell was apprehended during the action, the local police quickly rounded up all suspected communists in the city, including Jora and his brother. On Jora's arrest, a pack of manifestos were found under his clothes. As reported later by the Securitate's internal news bulletin, as well as biographic article in the Magazin Istoric magazine, during interrogations Jora refused to divulge information regarding his comrades. After a trial that lasted only four days, on 10 February 1941 the Military Tribunal of the 3rd Army Corps sentenced the Jora brothers to five years of penal labour and civic degradation each. Eleven other members of the cell received sentences ranging from 5 to 14 years of hard labour. The communist activists, imprisoned in the Galați Penitentiary, organised themselves in four party cells coordinated by a prison committee, and attended courses in history of the Communist Party of the Soviet Union, economy, arithmetic and others held by members of the group, including Constantinescu. The members of the group were moved to other prisons during the summer of 1941; suffering from lung disease, Ionel Jora was ultimately transferred to the Târgu Ocna Prison in early 1944.

After the 1944 Romanian coup d'état, with the Communist Party recognized as a legal organisation, Jora worked as an activist for the Covurlui County party committee. For a short time beginning with 1947, he returned to the Galați shipyard to work as a turner. Dissatisfied with this position, in early 1948 Ionel Jora requested to enrol in the Siguranța, soon to become the General Directorate for the Security of the People, joining as a lieutenant. In this capacity, together with other officers, he led a team active against anti-government armed bands which were hiding in the Vrancea Mountains. The band, constituted of members of the fascist Iron Guard, had been robbing local household and tourists, destroying sheepfolds, attacking local collective farms and had killed several forest workers. The Securitate managed to capture all of the members of the band, including its leader, who had initially managed to flee. Jora has been credited by Magazin Istoric with personally capturing the leader and preventing him from attacking another operative. He was also involved in the capture of another clandestine member of the Iron Guard who was preparing to flee the country. By the summer of 1949, Jora had been promoted to substitute political officer of the Râmnicu Sărat County Security Service.

In February 1950 Jora was assigned to lead a team in capturing a former member of the Gendarmerie accused of war crimes who had been hiding in Dâmbovița County. Depending on the account, the suspect either surrendered peacefully or Jora managed to capture him following a short struggle in April. Toma Bârlădeanu, the son of the suspected war criminal, witnessed the arrest and began seeking revenge. Initially, he planned to attack the Râmnicu Sărat Securitate office, however he renounced after his brother refused to participate. Afterwards, Bârlădeanu managed the find out Jora's identity and began secretly pursuing him. On 3 June 1950, Bârlădeanu managed to steal a Luger pistol from a Miliția officer he had befriended. After failing to find Jora on 4 June, the assassin returned the following day, spotting Jora around 11 PM in the town's public garden, as the latter was returning from work. Attacked by surprise near his home, Jora was barely able to defend himself and was ultimately shot by Bârlădeanu, dying on the spot. Toma Bârlădeanu stole Jora's pistol, hid the two guns and left for a nearby village. By 8 June, the Miliția officer whose pistol he had stolen managed to track him down and confronted him regarding the gun. Bârlădeanu initially denied involvement in Jora's death, however he acknowledged it after the officer suggested he would join him in forming an anti-communist group in the Apuseni Mountains. The officer led him to believe they will leave for the mountains, however he arrested him shortly after. Bârlădeanu was ultimately sentenced to death for terror acts by the Military Tribunal of Galați on 14 July 1950.

== Legacy ==
After his death, Jora's name was awarded to the Greierul metalworking plant in Galați, which became the "Ionel Jora" State Industrial Enterprise. The enterprise was eventually merged into the "June 11" Enterprise after 1959. Jora's life was the subject of a short film prepared for training of Securitate officers by the "Alexandru Sahia" Cinematographic Studio. A 1974 review in the Securitate internal news bulletin lists it among the films that, while not excelling at cinematographic technique, constituted valuable documentaries. Romanian realist sculptor Vasile Vedeș dedicated a bust to the Securitate officer, currently on display in the Museum of Visual Art of Galați. Jora's only son, Miron, studied at the Politechnical Institute of Galați, becoming a professor and specialist in welding engineering.
