= Grigore Preoteasa =

Romanian communist journalist and politician (1915–1957)

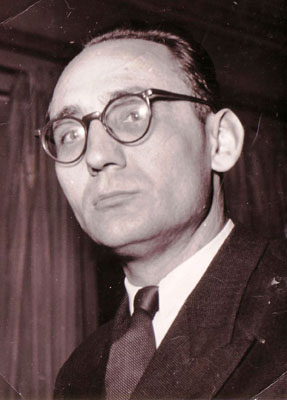

Foreign Affairs Minister of Romania
- In office October 4, 1955 – July 14, 1957
- Preceded by: Simion Bughici
- Succeeded by: Ion Gheorghe Maurer

Personal details
- Born: August 25, 1915 Bucharest, Kingdom of Romania
- Died: November 4, 1957 (aged 42) Moscow, Soviet Union
- Party: Romanian Communist Party
- Spouse: Ecaterina Preoteasa
- Children: George and Ilinca
- Occupation: journalist

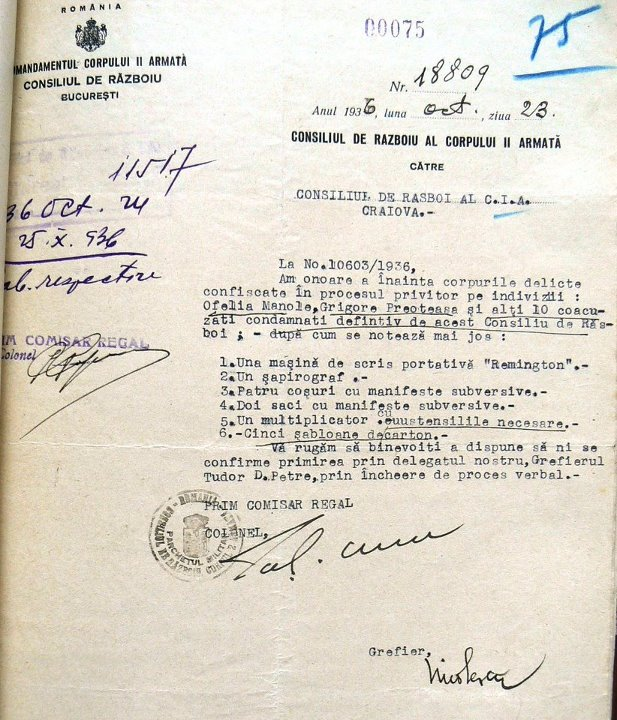
1936 Army memo, announcing the forwarding of the corpus delicti for Preoteasa's conviction: A Remington portable typewriter, a hectograph, 4 baskets of subversive manifestos, a mimeograph and 5 cartboard stencils.

Grigore Preoteasa (August 25, 1915 – November 4, 1957) was a Romanian communist activist, journalist and politician, who served as Communist Romania's Minister of Foreign Affairs between October 4, 1955, and July 1957.

== Biography ==
Born in Bucharest as the son of a worker for the Romanian Railways (CFR), he attended the University of Bucharest's Faculty of Letters during the 1930s, and began his association with the Romanian Communist Party (PCR or PCdR) during the Grivița Strike of 1933. First arrested the following year, he was repeatedly sentenced to prison terms, and detained at Jilava, Doftana, Craiova, Miercurea-Ciuc, and Caracal.

After 1936, Preoteasa joined the leadership of the Democratic Students' Front (Frontul Studențesc Democrat or Frontul Democratic Universitar), an anti-fascist organization created by the PCR in opposition to Iron Guard influence and headed by Gheorghe Rădulescu, Miron Constantinescu and Constanța Crăciun. He was consequently one of the most important cadres involved in agitprop, but, like his fellow activists Ion Popescu-Puțuri, Alexandru Iliescu, and Grigore Răceanu, appears to have been occasionally critical of guidelines imposed on the PCR by the Soviet Union and the Comintern.

A contributor to the PCR's illegal newspaper România Liberă, he was interned with other opponents of the Ion Antonescu dictatorship the Târgu Jiu camp for the larger part of World War II. Despite his imprisonment, materials signed in his name can be found in România Liberă issues from that same period — this has been attributed to 1950s forgery by the Communist Party's History Section (printing issues that had never existed were meant to mask the group's inactivity during World War II).

He escaped together with his friend Nicolae Ceaușescu in summer 1944, before Antonescu's toppling (see Romania during World War II). As two among the few intellectuals to stand at the party's forefront, Preoteasa and Constantinescu initially approached the group around Lucrețiu Pătrășcanu in opposition to General Secretary Ștefan Foriș, but, after Foriș was deposed, sided with new leader Gheorghe Gheorghiu-Dej. (The latter was sympathetic to Preoteasa, having worked with his father at the Grivița CFR facilities in Bucharest.)

As editor in chief of România Liberă between late 1944 and 1946 and press officer in the Propaganda Ministry (after 1945), he frequently attacked the opposition to the PCR-backed Petru Groza cabinet, and wrote against the National Peasants' Party in particular.

He was gradually promoted by Gheorghiu-Dej after their faction won supremacy inside the Romanian Workers' Party (PMR, the new name of the PCR after 1947). Selected a member of the Central Committee in December 1955, replacing Leonte Răutu as head of the Propaganda Section, he became secretary of the Central Committee and deputy member of the Politburo in June 1957. He was probably seen by Gheorghiu-Dej as a replacement for Răutu, who was by then falling out of favor.

As minister, Preoteasa was noted for handling the aftermath of the Hungarian Revolution of 1956, and for detaining on Romanian soil those Hungarian politicians who had been captured by the Soviets — including Imre Nagy (kept in a Securitate building in Snagov) and Georg Lukács. Following a request from János Kádár, Romanian authorities referred to many of these arrests as "granting asylum", implying that the Soviets had extended their protection in the face of counterrevolution. His government office was taken over by Ion Gheorghe Maurer in July 1957.

A member of the PMR delegation to the 40th anniversary of the October Revolution in Moscow (alongside Gheorghiu-Dej, Chivu Stoica, Alexandru Moghioroș, Ștefan Voitec, Ceaușescu, and Răutu), Preoteasa died at Vnukovo International Airport, minutes after their Ilyushin Il-14 aircraft missed the landing field and caught fire. According to witnesses, Preoteasa was the only person standing at the time, telling others that he was glad not to have been asked to wear a seat belt; when control of the airplane was lost, he remarked, probably in jest, "This was not in the schedule", which were to be his last words.

Recurring speculations that the incident had been specifically designed to kill Preoteasa, or that it was meant by the Soviets for Gheorghiu-Dej as relations between the latter and Nikita Khrushchev had soured dramatically, are contradicted by the fact that Ceaușescu, Răutu, and other passengers all sustained serious injuries while the Soviet crew was killed. Commentators tend to agree that his death did facilitate Ceaușescu's maneuvering for power after 1964.

== Legacy ==
Preoteasa was married to Ecaterina, and fathered a son George and daughter Ilinca, who was a high-ranking member of the Union of Communist Youth; previously married to Adrian Năstase, who was Prime Minister of Romania in 2000-2004, she emigrated to the United States.

His name was given to the Bucharest House for Student Culture and kept until the Romanian Revolution of 1989. The name endured as a common reference for the club after that date: "La Preoteasa" ("At Preoteasa") is the name of a song performed by Romanian rock band Sarmalele Reci on their first album, Țara te vrea prost.
