= 1957 Romanian Ilyushin Il-14 crash =

1957 aviation accident

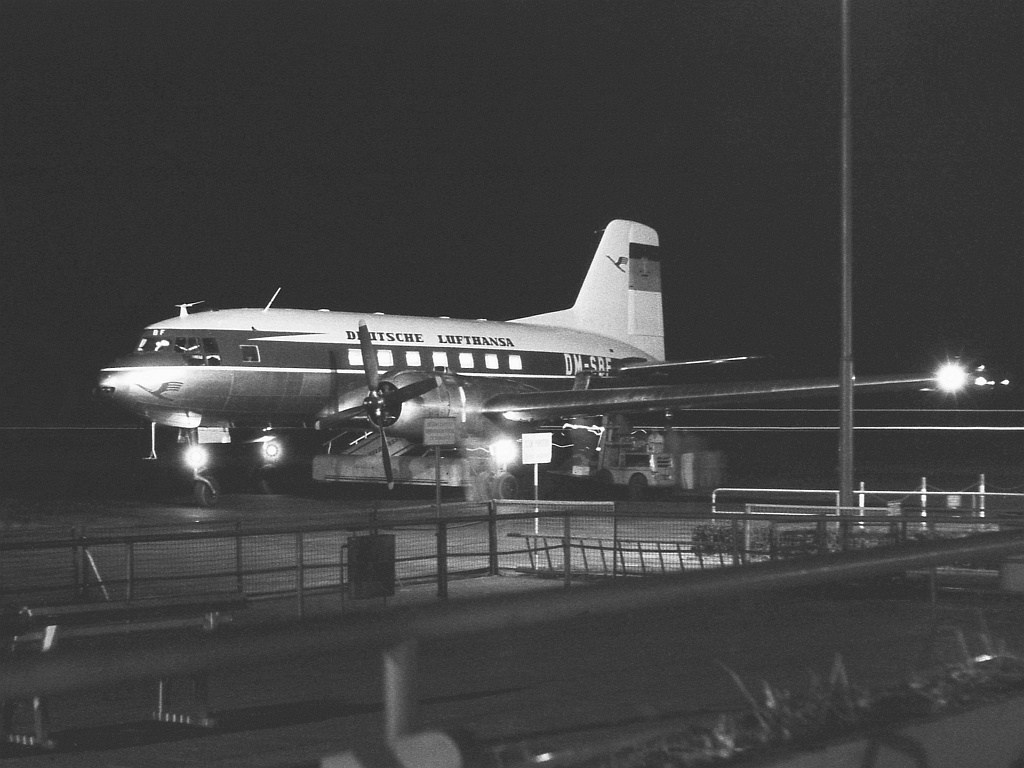
- A similar Il-14P

Accident
- Date: 4 November 1957
- Summary: Controlled flight into terrain
- Site: Near Vnukovo International Airport, Moscow, Soviet Union

Aircraft
- Aircraft type: Ilyushin Il-14P
- Operator: People's Republic of Romania
- Registration: YR-PCC
- Flight origin: Bucharest Otopeni Airport, Bucharest, Romania
- Stopover: Kiev Zhuliany Airport, Kiev, Soviet Union
- Destination: Vnukovo International Airport, Moscow, Soviet Union
- Passengers: 10
- Crew: 6
- Fatalities: 4
- Survivors: 12

On 4 November 1957, an Ilyushin Il-14 operated by the Romanian government crashed on approach to Vnukovo International Airport. Of the 16 people on board, four were killed, including Grigore Preoteasa, the Romanian Minister of Foreign Affairs. The cause was determined to be pilot error.

== Aircraft ==
The aircraft involved was an Ilyushin Il-14P with the tail number YR-PCC. It was delivered to the Romanian government in December 1956.

== Passengers and crew ==
The aircraft was on a government flight carrying members of a Romanian Workers' Party delegation to participate in the 40th anniversary of the October Revolution. The delegation consisted of Chivu Stoica, Nicolae Ceaușescu, Grigore Preoteasa, Ștefan Voitec, Alexandru Moghioroș, and Leonte Răutu.

The Il-14 was operated by a Soviet crew (names given in Romanian):

- Pilot-in-command Valerii Nicolaievici Sleacov
- Co-pilot Vladimir Iacovlevici Saraichin
- Navigator Ivan Ivanovici Hriucalov
- Aircraft technician Nicolai Zaharovici Pavlicov
- Radio operator Anatolii Grigorievici Romanov
- Flight mechanic Valerii Alexeievici Gurov

== Accident ==
The aircraft took off from Bucharest at 9:48 (Moscow time) and arrived at its stopover, Kiev, at 12:31, where the aircraft was refueled. At 15:27 the flight departed Kiev for Moscow, with estimated time of arrival at 18:00.

At 17:48, the Il-14 entered the Vnukovo area. The crew conducted an instrument approach owing to the adverse weather conditions (fog, low visibility). Clearing the inner marker, the pilot sighted the runway lights. At the same time, the controller noticed that the aircraft was at insufficient altitude and instructed the pilot to maintain altitude. However, this was not acknowledged and the Il-14 continued descending.

The aircraft struck trees and crashed in a wooded area short of the runway at 17:58. Preoteasa, who was not wearing a seatbelt, and Hriucalov were killed in the crash. Sleacov and Pavlicov later succumbed to their injuries. The rest of the occupants received injuries of varying degrees.

== Investigation ==
Alexei Kosygin led the investigation of the crash. The aircraft was in working conditions before and during the flight. The pilot-in-command had conducted a test flight on 2 November, however the Il-14 was flown without a co-pilot or navigator.

The investigation determined the cause to be pilot error. Upon passing the inner marker, Sleacov had been focused on the runway lights and continued descending against the given commands. Lack of training was cited as a contributing factor. Sleacov had falsified the crew's qualifications. In reality, the crew was unprepared for a landing in such weather conditions. The crew and the aircraft had not been checked before the flight.

It has been theorized that the crash was a Soviet plot to assassinate either Gheorghe Gheorghiu-Dej or Nicolae Ceaușescu. Gheorghiu-Dej was not present on the flight due to health reasons.
