= Pavel Ștefan =

Romanian communist politician (1914–1984)

Minister of Internal Affairs of Romania
- In office 20 September 1952 – 19 March 1957
- Prime Minister: Gheorghe Gheorghiu-Dej; Chivu Stoica
- Preceded by: Alexandru Drăghici
- Succeeded by: Alexandru Drăghici

Personal details
- Born: 16 December 1914 Bucharest, Kingdom of Romania
- Died: 22 January 1984 (aged 69) Bucharest, Socialist Republic of Romania
- Party: Romanian Communist Party
- Awards: Order of the Star of the Romanian Socialist Republic

Pavel Ștefan (16 December 1914 – 22 January 1984) was a Romanian communist politician who served as Minister of Internal Affairs from 20 September 1952 to 1957, in the first and second cabinets of Gheorghe Gheorghiu-Dej and in the First Stoica cabinet.

== Biography ==
He was expelled from the Romanian Communist Party from 1942 to 1945 for "faction activity" and again from 1958 to 1965, this time on the guilt of being "not completely honest with the party regarding his participation in some legionary meetings". Pavel Ștefan was elected deputy in the Great National Assembly in the sessions 1952 - 1957 and 1957 - 1961. He commanded to "cure the sick with work", referring to Romania's labour camp system. He became subject to investigation following his involvement in the violations of human rights in Romania's penal system. From 19.8.1969 to 11.02.1971 he served as Minister of Transport. At some point in the 40s he was acquainted with Franț Țandără.
