= Virgil Trofin =

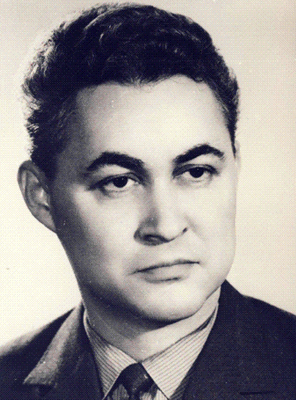
- Born: Virgil Trofin; July 24, 1926; Lipovăț, Vaslui County, Kingdom of Romania
- Died: June 1984 (aged 57); Bucharest, Socialist Republic of Romania
- Resting place: Ghencea Cemetery, Bucharest
- Occupations: Communist activist and politician
- Political party: Romanian Communist Party
- Spouse: Elena Trofin
- Children: Mircea, Ana
- Awards: Order of the Star of the Romanian People's Republic, 2nd class

Virgil Trofin (July 24, 1926 – June 1984) was a Romanian communist activist and politician, who served as minister under the Communist regime.

== Biography ==
Born in Lipovăț, Vaslui County, Trofin had an early career as a mechanical fitter and boilermaker, and joined the Romanian Communist Party in 1945. He was relatively close to Communist Party leader Ana Pauker before she was purged from office in 1953: he named his daughter in her honor (a common practice among prominent communists of the time).

Rallying with General Secretary Gheorghe Gheorghiu-Dej, he was among the younger activists to be promoted by the latter in the wake of Pauker's downfall. From June 1956 to June 1964, he was First Secretary of the Union of Communist Youth. In August 1964, he was awarded the Order of the Star of the Romanian People's Republic, 2nd class. In the Great National Assembly, Trofin represented Podu Turcului, Bacău County from 1957 to 1965, Gherla from 1965 to 1969, Pitești from 1969 to 1975, Brașov from 1975 to 1980, and Târgu Jiu from 1980 to November 1981.

His influence in the government increased due to his work in eliminating the primary obstacle to Nicolae Ceaușescu's rise to power, Gheorghe Apostol (during which time he joined the Politburo and Central Committee). A secretary of the Central Committee charged with cadre policies after 1965, Trofin served for a time as Deputy Prime Minister. From 1969 to 1971 he was chairman of the National Union of Agricultural Production Co-operatives.

In 1971, he was appointed as chairman of the Central Council of the General Union of Trade Unions but replaced in the party secretariat by Ion Iliescu (a Radio Free Europe analysis at the time proposed either that Trofin was demoted or that the Party placed more emphasis on workers by placing a high-ranking activist as union policy maker). He had his ups and downs in his relationship with Ceaușescu (with corresponding career successes and failures). In 1979, he replaced Vasile Patilineț as Minister of Mines, Oil and Geology.

In November 1981, Trofin was accused of being responsible for sending poor-quality coal to power stations, expelled from the Central Committee, and demoted to being chairman of the Central Committee of Artisans' Cooperatives, and, after further confrontations with the leadership, director of a collective farm in Călărași. In Victor Frunză's view, the charge was actually a cover-up for Ceaușescu's own mismanagement of the mining industry (before and after the Jiu Valley miners' strike of 1977).

He died in June 1984 at the Central Military Hospital in Bucharest; the official cause of death was listed as appendicitis. Based on various pieces of evidence, it was contended that he committed suicide. Contrary to official practice, no obituary was published in Communist Party newspapers, and the cause of death was not disclosed. He was buried on June 7 at the Ghencea Military Cemetery; one of those attending the funeral was Ion Iliescu.

Trofin and his wife, Elena, had a son, Mircea, and a daughter, Ana. The son, a prosecutor, was married from 1979 to 1982 to fashion model Melek Amet; his daughter became an actress at the Odeon Theatre (Giulești).
