= Nicolae Herlea =

Romanian singer (1927–2014)

- Born: 28 August 1927; Bucharest, Kingdom of Romania
- Died: 24 February 2014 (aged 86); Frankfurt, Germany
- Education: Bucharest Conservatory; Accademia di Santa Cecilia
- Occupations: Operatic baritone; Academic teacher
- Organizations: Bucharest Conservatory
- Awards: Order of the Star of the Romanian Socialist Republic; Order of the Star of Romania

Nicolae Herlea (Romanian: [nikoˈla.e ˈherle̯a]; 28 August 1927 – 24 February 2014) was a highly acclaimed Romanian operatic baritone and a voice teacher. He was particularly associated with the Italian repertory, especially the role of Rossini's Figaro, which he sang around 550 times during his career, and the title role of Verdi's Rigoletto.

== Biography ==
Born in Bucharest, Herlea studied at the Bucharest Music Conservatory under Aurel Costescu-Duca, and later at the Accademia di Santa Cecilia in Rome under Giorgio Favaretto. In 1951, he won first prizes in international singing contests in Geneva, Prague, and Brussels. He made his stage debut that same year at the Romanian National Opera in Bucharest as Silvio in Leoncavallo's Pagliacci, quickly establishing himself as the principal baritone there.

In 1958, he began appearing abroad, particularly at the Bolshoi Theatre in Moscow, to where he regularly returned. He also made guest appearances at London's Royal Opera House (1961), La Scala in Milan (1963) and the Metropolitan Opera in New York (1964–1967), and also performed at the Liceu in Barcelona, the Berlin Staatsoper, the Vienna State Opera, the Salzburg Festival, La Monnaie in Brussels, and in the opera houses of Prague and Budapest.

He made complete studio recordings of Il barbiere di Siviglia, Donizetti's Lucia di Lammermoor, Verdi's Rigoletto, La traviata and La forza del destino, Mascagni's Cavalleria rusticana, Pagliacci, and Puccini's Tosca, on labels such as Supraphon and Electrecord.

Herlea also had a successful career in the concert-hall. After he retired, he taught master classes at the Bucharest Conservatory. He was the president of the jury of the Hariclea Darclée International Voice Competition.

He was awarded in 1971 the Order of the Star of the Romanian Socialist Republic, 3rd class, and in 2000 the Order of the Star of Romania, Commander rank.

== Personal life ==
Herlea married Simona, a gynecologist, in 1969, and they had two sons, Robert Nicolae and Filip Anton. In 1983, Simona defected to Germany. During the last years of his life, Herlea lived in Frankfurt with his wife and sons.

Herlea died in Frankfurt on 24 February 2014, at the age of 86.
