= Union of Communist Youth =

Youth wing of the Romanian Communist Party, 1922-1989

Union of Communist Youth UTC Romanian: Uniunea Tineretului Comunist
- Emblem
- Founded: 1922
- Dissolved: 1989
- Headquarters: Bucharest, Socialist Republic of Romania
- Ideology: Communism; Marxism-Leninism
- Mother party: Romanian Communist Party
- National affiliation: Front of Socialist Unity and Democracy
- International affiliation: World Federation of Democratic Youth
- Newspaper: Scînteia Tineretului

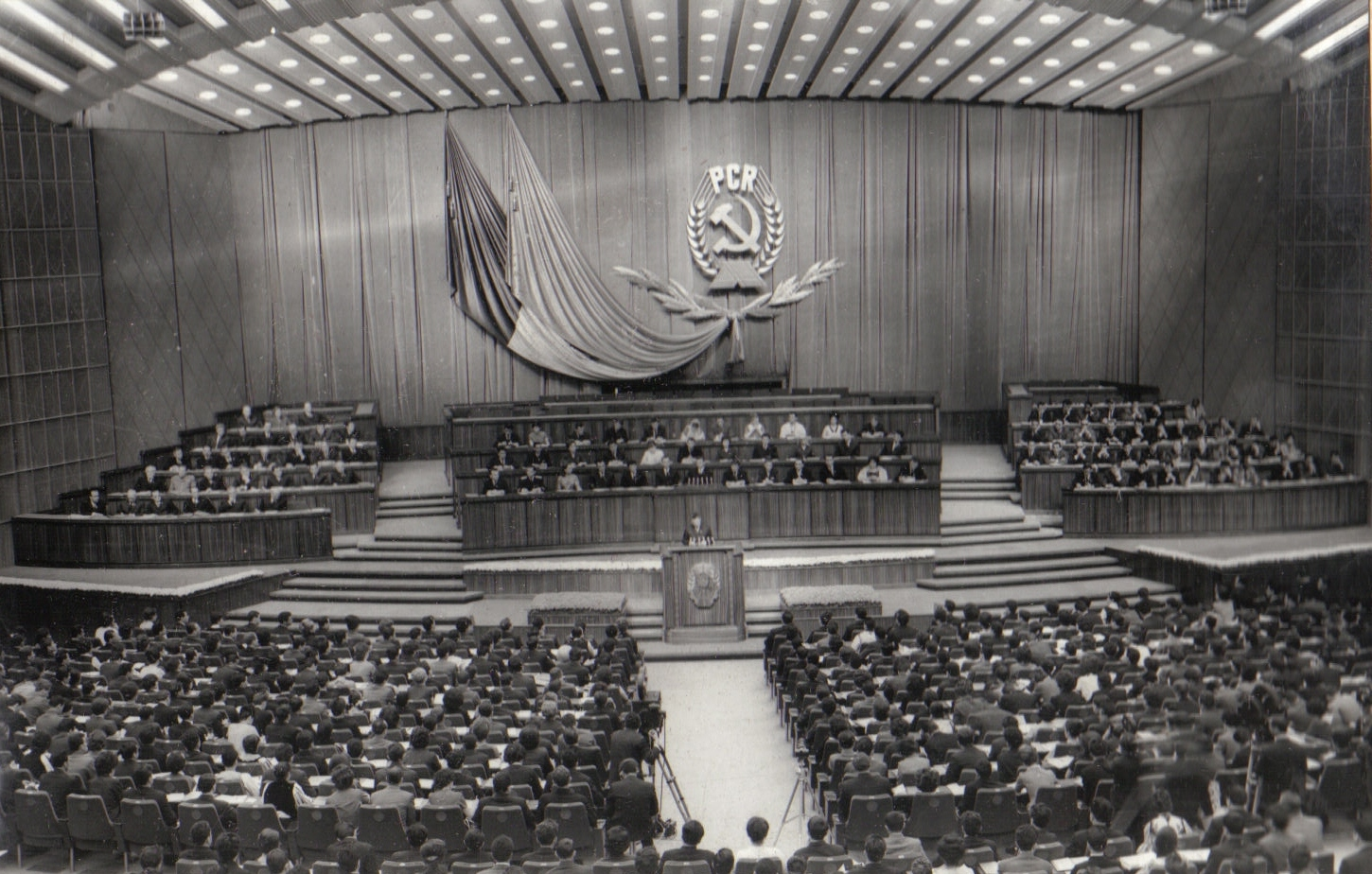
8th Congress of the UTC, held in Bucharest in July 1965

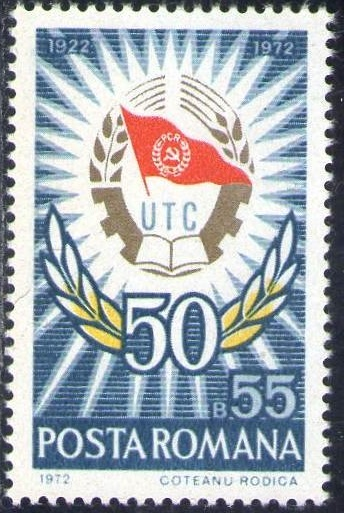
1972 postage stamp commemorating the UTC's 50th anniversary

The Union of Communist Youth (Romanian: Uniunea Tineretului Comunist; UTC) was the Romanian Communist Party's youth organisation. Like many Young Communist organisations, it was modelled after the Soviet Komsomol. It aimed to cultivate young cadres into the party, as well as to help create the "new man" envisioned by party ideologues.

== History ==
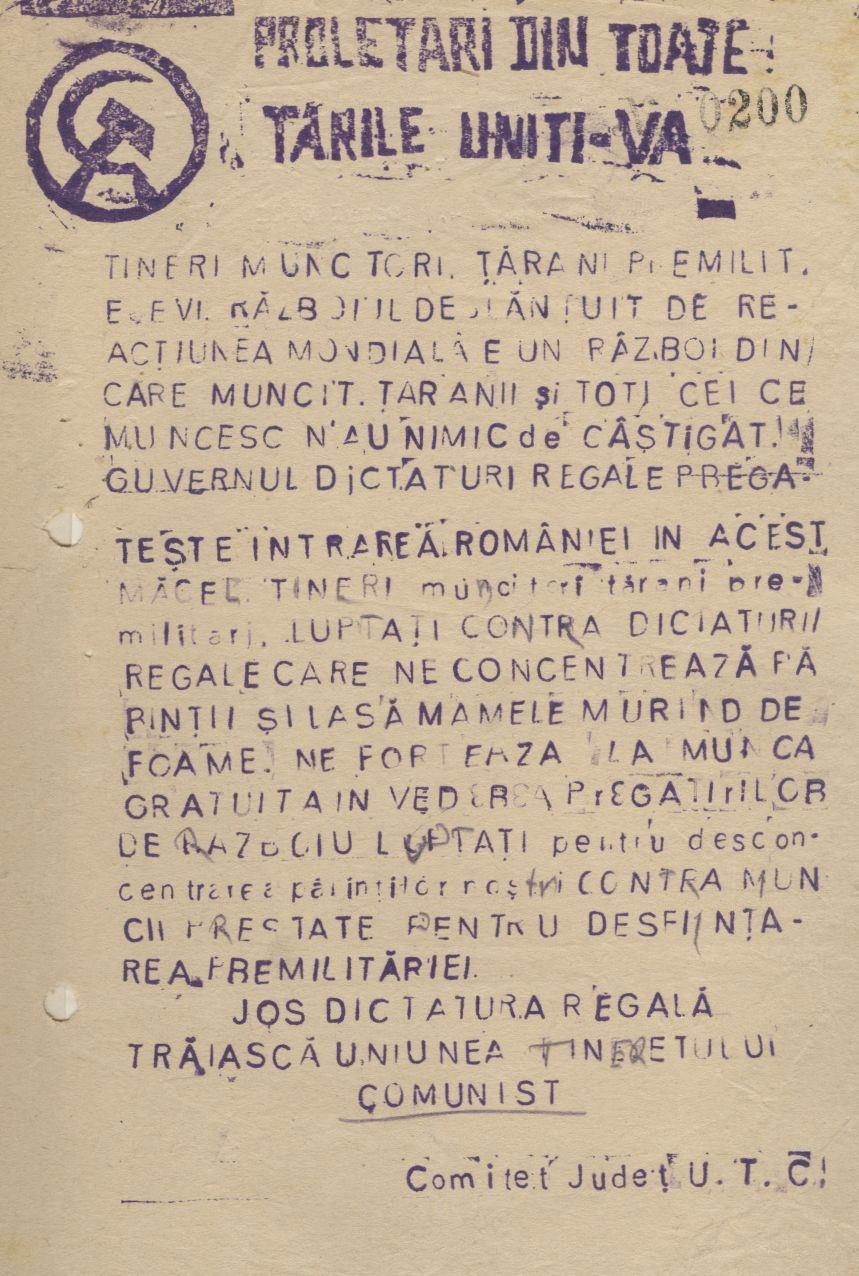
Union of Communist Youth manifesto against the National Renaissance Front and for "avoiding war", put out in Bessarabia in 1940, shortly before the occupation of the region by the Soviet Army

Founded in 1922, the UTC went underground along with the rest of the party when it was banned in 1924. A marginal group under strict control of the Comintern's Young Communist International, it began to emerge as a mass movement in 1944, after the Red Army had entered Romania and the party became legal once again. Nicolae Ceaușescu was the First Secretary of the UTC from August 23, 1944, to June 1945.

Beginning in 1948, the Romanian Workers' Party (PMR, as it was then called) began to contemplate merging and purging the country's youth organisations – political, professional, religious, cultural, etc. At the same time, young people were faced with several waves of arrests. Starting in 1945, participants at anti-communist demonstrations were arrested, while category-based arrests began in 1948. Members of youth liberal, peasant, and Iron Guard organisations were targeted, and political and religious youth organisations were shut down. The educational reform of 3 August 1948 initiated the ideological re-education of youth and Sovietization of the educational system by restructuring it along Marxist-Leninist principles. That year, the Komsomol recommended the formation of a single youth group, and at a congress on March 19–21, 1949, hitherto separate youth organisations were merged to create a Union of Working Youth (Uniunea Tineretului Muncitoresc; UTM). Its name was changed back to UTC in 1965.

Right after the single organisation was formed, the party asked for a purge, which in its first phase involved the "re-signing up" of UTM members (equivalent to PMR "verification" campaigns). After this process, 34,000 UTM members and activists were purged as "dangerous elements" (kulaks (chiaburi), former Iron Guard or National Christian Party members, former members of democratic parties, religious activists (especially non-Orthodox ones), UTM leaders who did not heed PRM decisions, etc.). The UTM now numbered 650,000 members; purges would continue, under the pretext of "improving its class composition", especially after the turbulent years of 1952, 1956, and 1968.

Removal from the UTM could mean social exclusion, professional marginalisation or even open the way to a criminal investigation. One's social origin and membership in a communist organisation were the most important factors in climbing up the political, social and professional ladders. UTM purges were one way that institutions, universities, schools, army units and factories were cleansed of troublesome elements. These purges had a major social impact, quickly and decisively changing the face of society, as membership steadily rose (some 20% of youths were in UTM in 1950; by the end of the decade, a third; in another decade, half; and by the 1980s the great majority).

One major dilemma was how to deal with the peasantry. Poor peasants were at first eagerly welcomed into the UTM, but 40% of those initially purged were peasants. This made the group rather unrepresentative in a country whose population was three-quarters rural at the time. The beginning of collectivisation in 1949 demanded a large presence of communist organisations in the villages, but by the end of the 1950s, only about 28.5% of the eligible rural population was in the UTM, which numbered 30-35% peasants. Their share steadily fell as urbanisation increased, to about a quarter in the 1960s and under 20% in the 1980s.

Starting in the 1950s, UTM activists were mobilised to help with collectivisation, participating in propaganda actions and unmasking class enemies at the party's behest. At UTM meetings, members were asked to convince their relatives and friends to give over their land to collectives, to denounce kulaks and those who opposed collectivisation, and even to speak out against marriages between kulaks and poor peasant girls.

In 1952, as Ana Pauker fell from grace for her "right-wing deviationism" that involved massive membership sign-ups, which, without proper vetting, had introduced numerous Iron Guardists and other "enemy elements" into the party, the ensuing purge hit the UTM as well. Between August 1952 and June 1953, 19,000 UTM members and activists were excluded for "right-wing deviationism". By contrast, 12,000 had been eliminated between October 1950 and August 1952. The crisis was accompanied by several leadership changes until 1956, when the party found in Virgil Trofin, who had worked as an officer in the Superior Political Directorate of the Army, the iron hand it was searching for to control the UTM; he held the post for eight years before being promoted into the party, surviving the successive intra-party crises of the late 1950s.

After the Hungarian Revolution of 1956, the UTM began to target university and high-school students. In fact they had long been eyed with suspicion for ideological reasons. Students had played a key role in the anti-communist demonstrations of 1945-46. Half of those initially purged from the UTM were students. In 1950, instructions for admission of new members specified that meritorious students "devoted to the organisation and the Party" would be admitted. At the same time, ideological criteria were applied for university admission, on the basis of social origin and pre-communist political allegiance (either of the students themselves or of their parents). Of 57,000 students, some 80-90% were in the UTM, as admission was otherwise very hard to obtain. By 1953, university and high-school students formed almost 30% of the UTM, a figure that declined sharply after 1956. In 1957 it had fallen to under 20%, and to under 10% by 1958-59, due to the massive purges provoked by the student protests of 1956.

During these demonstrations, UTM activists were instructed to prevent, discourage, denounce, unmask and fight against the "enemy protests" and were mobilised, alongside party activists and workers, to spy on student gatherings, crush demonstrations and waste students' free time. During the Bucharest student movement of 1956, groups of young UTM workers were assembled to physically beat the "bandits" (i.e., student protesters), and in 1957, UTM activists helped arrest young protesters in Cluj. Starting in 1956, several thousand students were arrested, of whom tens were sent to prison. Countless unmasking and indoctrination sessions were held by PMR and UTM leaders and activists. Tens of UTM chapters across Romania were dissolved.

Up to 1,500 UTM members were removed from the group every month. For the first time since 1948, total membership declined. Between July 1, 1956, and July 1, 1957, the proportion of workers in the UTM rose from 27% to 35%, while that of university and high-school students fell from 14% to 9%. Students at theological institutes were expelled from the UTM. During this period, Ion Iliescu, head of the UTC between 1967 and 1971, led the Union of Romanian Communist Student Associations.

After Nicolae Ceaușescu came to power in 1965, he pursued the goal of expanding mass organisations, trying to include as many people as possible in communist structures. Thus, while in 1960 UTM had 1.9 million members, UTC had 2.4 million members in 1971, 3.9 million in 1985, and 4.1 million by the end of the 1980s, when it was one of the most powerful mass organisations in the country. In 1983, 90% of 9th graders belonged to the UTC, and 98% in 1988. Beginning in 10th grade, practically everyone was in the UTC, membership being mostly automatic and compulsory. Those not in were usually excluded or expelled for some reason rather than simply not interested. In the 1970s and 1980s, internal instructions for admission to the UTC combined political and meritocratic criteria.

The UTC's anti-religious mission persisted. For instance, on December 26, 1968, Ion Iliescu convened an urgent session of the UTC's Central Committee to express his distress at the lack of combativeness displayed by UTC members toward 2,000 Christmas carolers the day before.

=== Structure ===
Membership was open to persons between the ages of fourteen and twenty-six; UTC members over eighteen could also become members of the PCR. The Tenth Party Congress in 1969 introduced the requirement that applicants under the age of twenty-six would be accepted into the party only if they were UTC members.

Having essentially the same organizational structure as the Romanian Communist Party (PCR, from 1965), the UTC was both a youth political party and a mass organization. Its mission was to indoctrinate young people in the spirit of communism and mobilize them, under the guidance of the PCR, for the building of socialism. The UTC organised political and patriotic courses in schools, among peasant groups, and among workers and members of the armed forces. It also guided and supervised the activities of the Union of Romanian Communist Student Associations.

The structure of the UTC underwent a number of changes in the decades following its creation. By the 1980s, the organization functioned on the national level with an eight-member Secretariat, including the first secretary, who was also the UTC chairman, and a bureau of twenty-one full and ten candidate members. The first secretary of the UTC also held the position of minister of youth. From 1983 to 1987, Ceauşescu's son, Nicu, functioned as UTC first secretary. This showed the importance of youth organisations for the regime, as Nicu was virtually the heir to power, and was also a clear indication of its dynastic and clientelistic nature. Nicu's poor reputation contributed to cynicism and corruption in the youth organisations, whose members had become blasé, bureaucratic and ritualised in nature, a far cry from their predecessors' fervor in the 1940s-1950s. The UTC had come to serve the dictator's personality cult, a form of political consolidation and social control.

In each of the forty counties (which took their present form in 1968) and the city of Bucharest, UTC committees were patterned after the national-level organization. The UTC had its own publishing facilities and published its own propaganda organ, Scînteia Tineretului ("The Spark of Youth").

== Other organizations ==
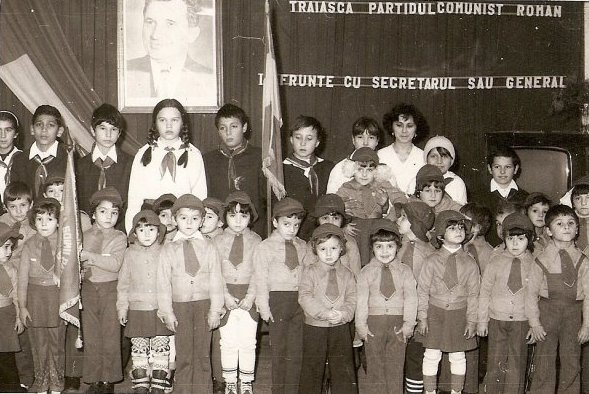
Members of Șoimii Patriei around 1983, standing beneath a portrait of Ceaușescu

Another youth movement, the Pioneer Organization, was created for young people between the ages of nine and fourteen. Until 1966 the Pioneers functioned as an integral part of the UTC, but thereafter they were under the direct control of the party Central Committee. Moreover, there were Șoimii Patriei ("The Fatherland's Falcons"), a youth organization established in 1976 where children aged four to seven could enter and where they learned to respect the party, also participating in demonstrations.

The UTC, the Pioneers and Şoimii Patriei, like the rest of the party, ceased to exist after the Romanian Revolution of 1989.

== First Secretaries (after 1967 also Ministers of Youth) ==
- Nicolae Popescu-Doreanu (1922–1923)
- Elena Filipovici (c. 1923–1924)
- Gheorghe Stoica (c. 1923-1924)
- Izo Ițkovici (c. 1924–1928)
- Haia Lifșiț (1928–1929)
- Vanda Nicolschi (1929)
- Dumitru Chelerman (c. 1929–1931)
- Alexandru Moghioroș (1933)
- Andrei Bernat (1935)
- Nicolae Ceaușescu (1939–1940, 1944–1945)
- Miron Constantinescu (1940)
- Ileana Răceanu (1940–1941)
- Ion Vincze (1941–1942)
- Vasile Tudose (late 1942–April 1944)
- Constantin Drăgoescu (1945)
- Mihai Dalea (1947–1948)
- Gheorghe Florescu (1948–August 1952), a former typographer
- Vasile Mușat (August 1952–July 1954), a lathe operator
- Cornel Fulger (July 1954 – June 1956), a former electrician
- Virgil Trofin (June 1956 – June 1964), a mechanical fitter and boiler maker
- Petru Enache (June 1964 – 1967), a lathe operator and graduate of the Ștefan Gheorghiu Academy
- Ion Iliescu (1967–1971)
- Marțian Dan (1971–1972), former secretary of the UTM committee of Romanian students in Moscow
- Ion Traian Ștefănescu (1972–1979), a jurist become activist
- Pantelimon Găvănescu (1979–1983), a worker and graduate of the Ștefan Gheorghiu Academy
- Nicu Ceaușescu (1983–1987)
- Ioan Toma (1987 – December 1989), a graduate of the Ștefan Gheorghiu Academy

== Other notable members ==
- Filimon Sârbu
- Justin Georgescu
- Nicolae Ceaușescu
- Alexandru Nicolschi
- Gheorghe Ursu
- Miron Constantinescu
- Vladimir Colin
- Adrian Păunescu
- Nicolae Labiș
- Vladimir Tismăneanu
- George Copos
- Mihai Răzvan Ungureanu
- Cristian Diaconescu
- Dan Pavel
- Emilian Bucov
