= Order of the Star of the Romanian Socialist Republic =

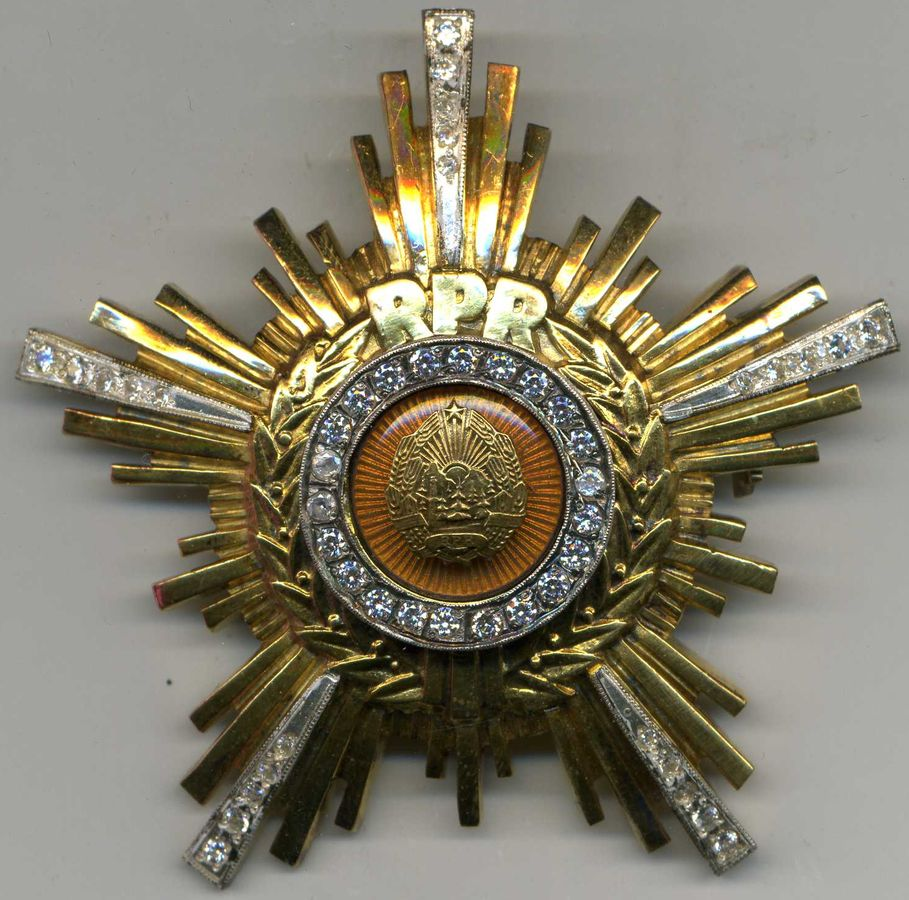
- Order of the Star of the Socialist Republic of Romania, 1st Class
- Established: January 12, 1948
- Classes: 1st through 5th
- Ribbon, 1st Class

The Order of the Star of the Socialist Republic of Romania (Romanian: Ordinul Steaua Republicii Socialiste România), from 1948 to 1965 the Order of the Star of the Romanian People's Republic (Romanian: Ordinul Steaua Republicii Populare Române), was the second-highest honor bestowed by the Socialist Republic of Romania (known as the Romanian People's Republic from 1947 to 1965). Established on 12 January 1948, during the regime's first month, it came in five classes:

== Recipients ==
Recipients of its first class included Siegfried Wolfinger (1952), Lucia Sturdza-Bulandra (1953), Emil Bodnăraș, Justinian Marina, Gala Galaction (1954), Dimitrie Cuclin (1955), Simion Stoilow (1957), Alexandru Kirițescu, László Szabédi, Petre Antonescu, Cicerone Theodorescu (1958), N. Gh. Lupu, Károly Kós (1959), Tudor Arghezi (1960), Ion S. Gheorghiu, Gheorghe Macovei, Erasmus Julius Nyárády, Horia Maicu, George Oprescu, Mihail Jora, Miron Radu Paraschivescu (1961), Ion Agârbiceanu, Nicolae Profiri, Aurel Beleș, Corneliu Miklosi, Ion Jalea, Patriarch Alexy I of Moscow, Perpessicius (1962), Leontin Sălăjan (1963), Nikita Khrushchev (1964), Constantin Daicoviciu, Gheorghe Gaston Marin, Gogu Rădulescu (1964), Mohammad Reza Shah Pahlavi (1966), Charles de Gaulle (1968), Simion Bughici (1971), Nicolae Giosan (1971 and 1981), Elizabeth II (1978, returned the decoration in 1989 because "of revulsion at the abuse of human rights in Romania for which Ceaușescu is responsible"), Suharto (1982), and Kim Il Sung (1982).

Recipients of its second class included Gheorghe Pintilie (1948), Corneliu Baba, Alexandru Bârlădeanu, Mihai Beniuc, Geo Bogza, Elie Carafoli, George Călinescu, Nicolae Corneanu, Virgil Trofin (1964), Alexandru Ciucurencu (1971), Miltiade Filipescu, Zoltán Franyó, George Georgescu, Mihai Gheorghiu, Ion Irimescu, Athanase Joja, Barbu Lăzăreanu, Cezar Lăzărescu, Gheorghe Mihoc, Marin Preda, Șerban Țițeica, and Virgil Teodorescu.

Dumitru Coliu received both classes, in 1948 and 1957, respectively.

Recipients of the third class of the order include Ghizela Vass (1948), Maria Banuș, George S. Bărănescu, Theodor Burghele (1964), Ion Ceaușescu, Tudor Ciortea, Alexandru Dima, Ion Finteșteanu, Nicolae Herlea, Ligia Macovei, Constantin Marin, and Gellu Naum (1971).
