= Liuba Chișinevschi =

Romanian communist politician (1911–1981)

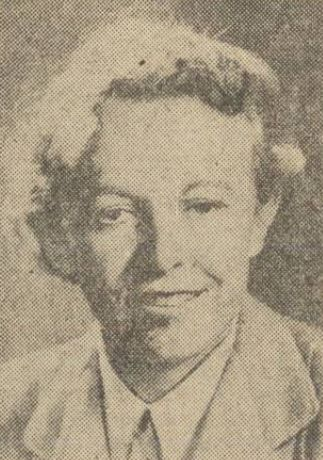
- Liuba Chișinevschi
- Born: Liuba Kishinevskaya; 1911; Tighina, Bessarabia Governorate, Russian Empire
- Died: 16 March 1981 (aged 70); Bucharest, Socialist Republic of Romania
- Known for: Trade unionist
- Political party: Romanian Communist Party
- Spouse: Iosif Chișinevschi
- Awards: Order of the Crown of Romania, Officer class Order of Tudor Vladimirescu, 2nd class

Liuba Chișinevschi (Russian: Люба Кишинёвская; 1911 – 16 March 1981) was a Romanian communist activist. She was the wife of communist politician Iosif Chișinevschi. Liuba Chișinevschi was a member of the Central Committee of the Romanian Communist Party, a deputy in the 1952–1957 session and a member of the Presidium of the Great National Assembly of Romania, secretary of the Central Council of Trade Unions, member and then vice-chairman of the Party Control Commission. She died in 1981.

== Distinctions ==
- Order of the Crown of Romania, Officer class (November 1947)
- Medal "The Fifth Anniversary of the Romanian People's Republic" (24 December 1952) "for the struggle and work carried out for the creation, consolidation and prosperity of the Romanian People's Republic"
- Order of Tudor Vladimirescu, 2nd class (4 May 1971) "on the occasion of the 50th anniversary of the establishment of the Romanian Communist Party, [...] for long-term activity in the labor movement and special merits in the work of building socialism"
