= Simion Bughici =

Romanian communist politician (1914–1997)

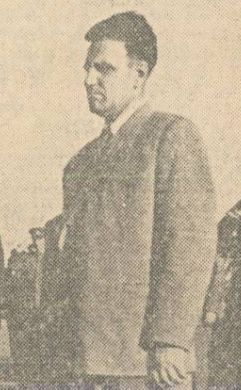

Minister of Foreign Affairs of Romania
- In office July 10, 1952 – October 3, 1955
- President: Gheorghe Gheorghiu-Dej
- Preceded by: Ana Pauker
- Succeeded by: Grigore Preoteasa

Personal details
- Born: December 14, 1914 Iași, Kingdom of Romania
- Died: February 1, 1997 (aged 82) Bucharest, Romania
- Awards: Order of the Star of the Romanian Socialist Republic

Simion Bughici (b. Simon David, December 14, 1914 – February 1, 1997) was a Romanian communist politician who served as the Minister of Foreign Affairs of Romania.

== Life and career ==
Bughici was born in Iași to a Jewish family of klezmer musicians; his father and two brothers perished during the June 1941 Iași pogrom. He joined the banned Communist Party of Romania in 1933. He worked as a weaver at the Adriana factory in Iași, and was active in communist organizations in the Bistrița, Trotuș, and Prahova Valley regions. In 1935 he was arrested and sentenced to 5 years of prison by the Brașov tribunal; held at Doftana Prison, he was released in 1940. Soon after he was re-arrested and sent to the Caracal and Târgu Jiu internment camps. During World War II, Bughici was imprisoned at Vapniarka concentration camp in Transnistria. In March 1944 he escaped during the transfer from the Grosulovo camp to Târgu Jiu.

After the installation of Communist rule, Bughici served as an Ambassador of Romania to Soviet Union in 1949–1952. In July 1952, he was appointed Minister of Foreign Affairs of Romania, replacing Ana Pauker, who was sacked by the communist leadership aided by Joseph Stalin. The appointment of Bughici disassociated Pauker's downfall from the anti-Semitism widely seen in Eastern Europe at the time. Bughici served as minister until October 1955. During his political career, he also served as the Vice Prime Minister of Romania. Other offices that he held were that of head of Centrocoop, Minister of the Food Industry and vice president of the Communist Party Control Commission (Colegiul Central de Partid) (1969–1974). He served as a deputy in the Great National Assembly for several constituencies from 1948 to 1975.

In 1971, Bughici was awarded the Order of the Star of the Romanian Socialist Republic, First class. He was married to Ana Friedman, a history teacher and school principal.

== See also ==
- Romanian Communist Party
- Foreign relations of Romania
