= Constantin Popescu (politician) =

Romanian politician and forestry engineer

Constantin Popescu (27 October 1921 – 14 November 1999) was a Romanian communist politician and forestry engineer.

Born in Pesceana, Vâlcea County, Constantin Popescu graduated as a Silviculture Engineer from the Polytechnic University of Bucharest.

From November 1952 to March 1957, he served in several cabinets under the communist regime. In particular, he was Minister of Forestry Management from November 1952 to January 1953 under Gheorghe Gheorghiu-Dej. In the next Gheorghiu-Dej cabinet, he held the same post from January to November 1953. Then, from May 1954 to October 1955, he was Forestry Agriculture Minister. Under Chivu Stoica, he was Forestry Agriculture Minister from October 1955 to January 1956. Finally, he was Forestry Management Minister from January 1956 to March 1957.

Constantin Popescu died in Bucharest nearly a decade after the fall of communism in Romania, at age 78.
