= Iosif Chișinevschi =

Romanian communist politician (1905–1963)

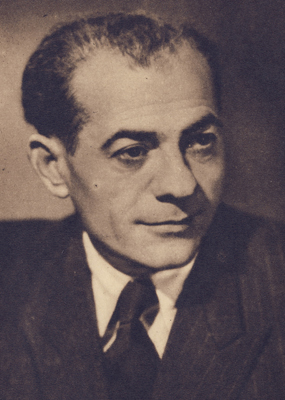
- Born: Jakob Roitman; 26 December 1905; Bălți, Bessarabia Governorate, Russian Empire
- Died: 1963 (aged 57–58); Bucharest, Romanian People's Republic
- Education: International Lenin School
- Occupation: propagandist
- Political party: Romanian Communist Party
- Spouse: Liuba Chișinevschi
- Children: 4

Iosif Chișinevschi (born Jakob Roitman; 26 December 1905 – 1963) was a Romanian communist politician. A leading ideologue of the Romanian Communist Party (PCR) from 1944 to 1957, he served as head of its Agitprop Department from 1948 to 1952 and was in charge of propaganda and culture from 1952 to 1955. He has been described as "Moscow's right-hand man in Romania".

== Biography ==
=== Early life ===
Chișinevschi was born to a poor Jewish family in Bălți, in the Bessarabia Governorate of the Russian Empire (present-day Moldova). Largely self-taught and a high-school dropout, he joined the PCR in 1928. Arrested that year (since the PCR had been banned in 1924), he went to the Soviet Union upon his release in 1930. He attended the Comintern's International Lenin School (his only ideological training) and was a participant at the Vth PCR Congress, held in Gorikovo near Moscow in December 1931. The Comintern delegates to the congress, Béla Kun and Dmitry Manuilsky, sponsored his election to the PCR central committee. He had personal connections within the Soviet secret police, of which he was an agent (which he remained through the 1950s), infiltrating the PCR hierarchy's upper ranks.

Chișinevschi came back to Romania with instructions from Moscow, helping to reorganize the Agitprop Department, the PCR's propaganda nucleus. During the party's years of underground activity, he helped orient it toward Bolshevism (specifically Stalinism). He shunned real intellectual problems and the debates of the Marxist left, instead idolizing Joseph Stalin. He was most influenced by the latter's Foundations of Leninism, a sort of thumbnail sketch of revolutionary theory; once he had read the History of the Communist Party of the Soviet Union (Bolsheviks) Short Course, with its blatant falsifications, he looked no further than Stalin for ideological guidance. A devoted Comintern man, he was unconcerned with Romania's cultural and political history and context.

Arrested again in 1933, he was freed in 1936 and integrated into the secretariat of the Central Committee, becoming head of the Bucharest party organization.

=== In power ===
Reconfirmed as a member of the PCR Central Committee in 1940, he was arrested that year, spending World War II in the Caransebeș Prison and the Târgu Jiu internment camp, where he was among the closest associates of Gheorghe Gheorghiu-Dej, especially after 1942. Having navigated for several years between the party's Gheorghiu-Dej and Ștefan Foriș, he participated in the staging of a plot that resulted in the latter's elimination and assassination, accusing him of being a collaborator of the Kingdom of Romania's secret police, Siguranța Statului. Joining the Politburo after August 23, 1944, he participated in the anti-intelligentsia campaign, also publishing several articles and brochures under the pen name of Stănciulescu the following year. Between 1952 and 1954, he was intimately involved in the shadowy machinations that led to the downfall of Ana Pauker, the execution of Lucrețiu Pătrășcanu, and the trial of Vasile Luca.

Despite his Jewish ethnicity, Chișinevschi frantically distanced himself from his origins and helped persecute Jews. For instance, on January 14, 1953, he wrote: "The Jewish communities have always been a nest of thieves, of spies. The communities have always had Filderman and from the exploitation and robbing of poor people, to acts of criminal espionage, these have been part of their agenda. This is why I think we have to proceed firmly. The devil take them—they will eventually be quiet; otherwise they will damage us, and not only us, but the entire camp of peace".

Chișinevschi, known among party members as Ioșka, was a consummate intriguer and opportunist, sycophantically subservient to his superiors, vindictive, and despotic toward his subordinates. He was the patron of an entire group of crude, narrow-minded and aggressive apparatchiks who dominated Romania's spiritual life during the years of unrestrained Stalinism. As a committed Stalinist, he was unconditionally devoted to the USSR and identified his own destiny with that of the "homeland of socialism". He participated in all the important meetings with Soviet representatives and delegates from other Eastern European countries, also coordinating the party's international relations and supervising cadre policy.

=== Downfall ===
For Chișinevschi, one's attitude toward the USSR was his most important criterion of Leninist orthodoxy. Thus, when the Soviets changed course at the 20th Party Congress (which Chișinevschi attended), he zealously changed course and immediately began spreading insidious critical allusions about his old friend Gheorghiu-Dej, hoping to cover up his own past crimes and abuses. At the March 1956 plenary, he and Miron Constantinescu called for a liberalisation, something that Gheorghiu-Dej categorically rejected. He did not make his proposal out of genuinely reformist sentiments, but rather because "his enduring opportunism, his unsurpassed chameleon-type of political conduct materialized in his will to associate himself with the group that was most probable to win the battle". As "a true follower of Moscow's line, whatever its twist or turn, he grasped an opportunity to undermine Gheorghiu-Dej and re-compose for himself the image of a fighter for intra-party democracy". Thinking that "a critical re-assessment of the Stalinist purges in Romania was inevitable", he aligned himself in opposition to Gheorghiu-Dej.

Probably encouraged by Khrushchev, Chișinevschi and Constantinescu sought allies on the Politburo to topple Gheorghiu-Dej by majority vote; they drew Constantin Pîrvulescu, president of the party control commission to their side, but failed to capture Alexandru Moghioroș, who informed Gheorghiu-Dej of the conspiracy.

After this, despite renewed professions of faith in Gheorghiu-Dej, Chişinevschi had no chance of political survival, as the former surpassed him in ability and duplicity. During the June 28–29 and July 1–3, 1957 plenum of the Central Committee, the Chișinevschi–Constantinescu "factionalist group" (invented by Gheorghiu-Dej for propaganda purposes) was purged from the Politburo. In June 1960, the Third Congress of the Romanian Workers' Party (as the PCR was then called) did not re-elect him to the Central Committee.

In late 1956, knowing about his dissent from Gheorghiu-Dej's line that March, the leaders of the Bucharest student movement of 1956 saw Chișinevschi, then vice president of the Council of Ministers, as a potential interlocutor, but he rebuffed their calls for dialogue.

At the November 30–December 5, 1961 Central Committee plenum, his former comrades cruelly humiliated him: Gheorghiu-Dej, Nicolae Ceaușescu, Ion Gheorghe Maurer, Leonte Răutu, Petre Borilă, Moghioroș, Alexandru Sencovici, Valter Roman did not hesitate to accuse the man formerly celebrated as the "brain of the party", now the director of the Casa Scînteii printing works. It was here that Gheorghiu-Dej, absolving himself of responsibility, denounced the alleged Pauker–Luca–Georgescu and Chișinevschi–Constantinescu factions as being responsible for Romania's worst Stalinist excesses. When Chișinevschi died of cancer in 1963, no obituary appeared in Romania. In April 1968, Ceaușescu relished the opportunity to denounce him (along with Gheorghiu-Dej and Alexandru Drăghici) for Pătrășcanu's execution.

== Family ==
After Chișinevschi's first wife died, he married Liuba Chișinevschi (1911–1981), a party member from 1930 and an activist during its underground years (whose last name he took). In 1946, she helped her husband secure the job of food-procurement officer for the Soviet army of occupation in Romania. From 1952 to 1954, she was on the Central Committee. In addition, she served as vice president of the Trade Union Confederation and of the Great National Assembly, and as deputy chair of the party's control commission (1955–1960). His eldest son, Milea, emigrated to Canada, while two other sons, Andrei and Gheorghe, left for Israel, where the latter died in the late 1980s. A fourth son, Iuri (b. 1945), still lived in Romania as of 2006.
