= Ilie G. Murgulescu =

Romanian physical chemist, communist politician

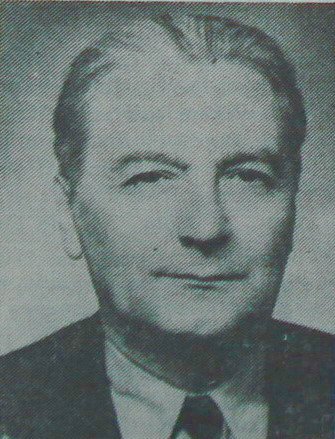
Ilie G. Murgulescu

Ilie G. Murgulescu (Cornu, 27 January 1902 – Bucharest, 28 October 1991) was a Romanian physical chemist and a communist politician. He was president of the Romanian Academy (1960–1963) and Minister of Education (1953–1956 and 1960–1963). He founded the Institute of Physical Chemistry of the Romanian Academy where he presided until 1977. His investigations on physical chemistry covered a broad realm. Among his main results can be cited those he got on molten salts electrochemistry. He did doctoral work on Copper thiosulfate complex photochemistry under Fritz Weigert in Leipzig as adviser.

His son participated in manifestations of support towards the Hungarian revolution in 1956. This event affected Murgulescu's position in the government. After a while he was reinstated at the Ministry of Education.

He was elected honorary member of the Hungarian Academy of Sciences. He authored a series of didactic books in 7 volumes on Physical chemistry called Introduction to Physical Chemistry printed between 1976 and 1984.

In 1981, Murgulescu became a founding member of the World Cultural Council.

== Notes ==
Preceded by Constantin Cândea	Rector of the Polytechnic University of Timișoara; 1947–1949	Succeeded by Nicolae Maior
