= Constanța Crăciun =

Romanian politician

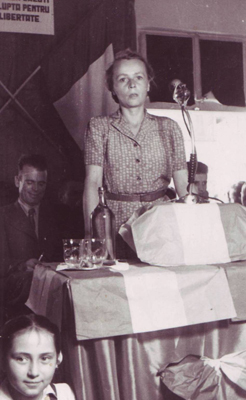

Minister of Culture
- In office 30 November 1953 – 19 March 1957
- Prime Minister: Gheorghe Gheorghiu-Dej; Chivu Stoica
- Succeeded by: Miron Constantinescu

Vice President of the State Council
- In office 21 August 1965 – 1969
- President: Chivu Stoica; Nicolae Ceaușescu
- Preceded by: Ștefan Voitec
- Succeeded by: Manea Mănescu

Personal details
- Born: 16 February 1914 Constanța, Kingdom of Romania
- Died: 2 May 2002 (aged 88) Bucharest, Romania
- Spouse: Ion Vincze (died 1996)

Constanța Crăciun (Note: Romanian pronunciation: [konˈstantsa krəˈtʃjun]) (16 February 1914 – 2 May 2002) was a Romanian politician and educator.

== Biography ==
She was born in Constanța. She studied literature and philosophy. She became a member of the Romanian Communist Party in 1935. She was arrested in 1942 and sentenced to 25 years in prison, serving time in the Văcărești and Mislea prisons before she was released in 1944. From 1948 to 1953, she was a member of the Great National Assembly of the Romanian People's Republic. She served as Minister of Culture from 30 November 1953 to 19 March 1957 and, in 1959, became deputy minister of culture. From 1962 to 1965, she was president of the State Committee for Culture and Art. From 1965 to 1969, she was vice-president of the State Council.

Crăciun was a member of the Central Committee of the Communist Party from 1945 to 1969 (and a member of its Organizing Board in 1950) and from 1972 to 1974. She was given the title Hero of Socialist Labour in 1971. In the same year, she received the "hammer and sickle" gold medal.

Crăciun was married to Ion Vincze, also a prominent member of the Communist Party. She died in Bucharest at the age of 88.

== Awards ==
- The title of Hero of Socialist Labour (4 May 1971) "on the occasion of the 50th anniversary of the founding of the Romanian Communist Party, for long activity in the labor movement and special merits in the work of building socialism in this country"
- The golden medal "Secera și ciocanul" (4 May 1971) "on the occasion of the 50th anniversary of the establishment of the Romanian Communist Party, for long activity in the labor movement and special merits in the work of building socialism in the homeland"
