= Miron Constantinescu =

Romanian politician

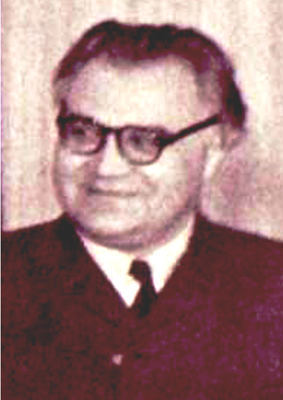

President of the Great National Assembly
- In office 28 March 1974 – 18 July 1974
- President: Nicolae Ceaușescu
- Preceded by: Ştefan Voitec
- Succeeded by: Nicolae Giosan

Vice President of the State Council
- In office 1972 – 28 March 1974
- President: Nicolae Ceaușescu
- Preceded by: Manea Mănescu
- Succeeded by: Ștefan Voitec

Chairman of the State Planning Committee
- In office 28 January 1953 – 4 October 1955
- Prime Minister: Gheorghe Gheorghiu-Dej
- Preceded by: Petre Borilă
- Succeeded by: Alexandru Bârlădeanu

Minister of Education
- In office 19 August 1969 – 25 November 1970
- Prime Minister: Ion Gheorghe Maurer
- Preceded by: Ștefan Bălan
- Succeeded by: Mircea Malița

Member of the Politburo of the Central Committee
- In office 1945–1974

Personal details
- Born: 13 December 1917 Chișinău, Romania (now Moldova, or Odesa, Ukraine)
- Died: 18 July 1974 (aged 56) Bucharest, Communist Romania
- Party: Romanian Communist Party
- Spouse: Sulamita Bloch-Constantinescu
- Children: 2 daughters
- Education: Faculty of Philosophy of University of Bucharest
- Occupation: sociologist

Miron Constantinescu (13 December 1917 – 18 July 1974) was a Romanian communist politician, a leading member of the Romanian Communist Party (PCR, known as PMR for a period of his lifetime), as well as a Marxist sociologist, historian, academic, and journalist. Initially close to Communist Romania's leader Gheorghe Gheorghiu-Dej, he became increasingly critical of the latter's Stalinist policies during the 1950s, and was sidelined together with Iosif Chișinevschi. Reinstated under Nicolae Ceauşescu, he became a member of the Romanian Academy.

== Biography ==
=== Early life ===
Constantinescu was said to be born in Chișinău, Bessarabia, at a time when the region was experiencing the aftermath of the October Revolution. (During the same month, the Moldavian Democratic Republic was proclaimed, leading to the union of Bessarabia with the Kingdom of Romania). According to fellow communist Alexandru Bârlădeanu, Constantinescu was born in Odesa. Widely believed to be an illegitimate son of the geologist Gheorghe Munteanu-Murgoci, Constantinescu retreated to a Romanian Orthodox monastery a short while after receiving his bachelor's degree.

According to Bârlădeanu, Constantinescu used this period to decide between siding with the fascist Iron Guard and joining the PCR. In 1935, he joined the Union of Communist Youth, UTC (youth wing of the PCR), and became involved in agitprop campaigns. During the 1930s, he attended the University of Bucharest's Faculty of Letters and Philosophy, becoming one of sociologist Dimitrie Gusti's most notable students.

With Bârlădeanu, Grigore Preoteasa, Gheorghe Rădulescu, Constanța Crăciun, and others, Constantinescu founded the anti-fascist Frontul Studențesc Democrat (FSD, the Students' Democratic Front) in 1935. The group was, in effect, an outlet of the Communist Party — its entire leadership continued to carry party work throughout the FSD's existence. The following year, as the UTC was dissolved, Constantinescu was among the few of its members to continue political activity in PCR ranks. In 1938, during the National Renaissance Front regime established by King Carol II, the Communist Party ordered him to reestablish the UTC. He was among the few intellectuals at the forefront of party activities.

=== World War II and Scînteia ===
In World War II, authorities were alarmed by his alleged contacts with the Soviet Union and NKVD agents, at the time when Ion Antonescu's regime allied itself with Nazi Germany and took part in Operation Barbarossa (see Romania during World War II). At the end of 1940 he was sent by the Communist Party's central leadership to Galați in order to coordinate the local cells, comprising, among others, future Securitate operative Ionel Jora. Constantinescu was arrested there in January 1941, after a local communist was captured while distributing anti-fascist flyers. Eventually, he was interned, initially in the Târgu Jiu camp. Although, like Preoteasa, he was originally close to Lucrețiu Pătrășcanu (who was himself an intellectual isolated among PCR members), Constantinescu associated with Gheorghiu-Dej/Emil Bodnăraș faction while in detention, endorsing successful moves against rival leader Ștefan Foriș.

Kept alongside other prominent activists in the Caransebeș Prison, where he is believed to have been included in Gheorghiu-Dej's projected Soviet-backed government, he became the focus of attention from penal authorities after being caught while composing messages addressed to the outside (upon discovery, he attempted to swallow all the rolling papers he had written on). Consequently, the administration separated Communist prisoners into two groups: Constantinescu's was sent to Lugoj prison.

An editor in chief of the PCR's Scînteia after the start of Soviet occupation, Constantinescu led the panel of journalists towards Stalinist guidelines, and encouraged a personality cult around Gheorghiu-Dej, whose biography he helped falsify. He was himself praised in the PCR press, and papers circulated the notion that he worked as much as 14 or 16 hours a day as a rule. In February 1945, during street clashes between pro-Communist forces and authorities (leading to the fall of the Nicolae Rădescu cabinet), Scînteia published a claim that its editor had been the target of an assassination attempt.

Through his editorials of 1947, Constantinescu signaled an attack on Foreign Minister Gheorghe Tătărescu, leader of the National Liberal Party-Tătărescu and associate of the Communists in the Petru Groza government, who had criticized his allies' economic and social policies.

=== Politburo and Planning Committee ===
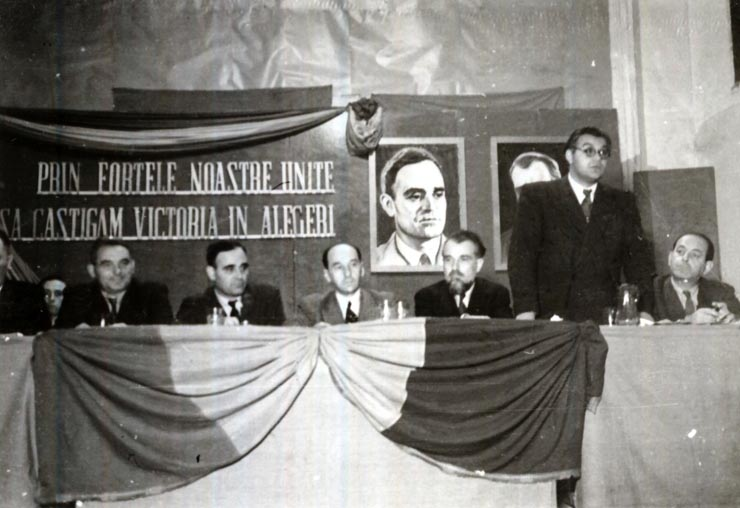
Official tribune at the PCR–PSDR summit at Paris Cinema, October 23, 1946. Constantinescu is speaking; also pictured: Ștefan Voitec, Gheorghe Gheorghiu-Dej, and Vasile Luca

Taking a seat on the Politburo, as its youngest member, in early 1945, Constantinescu, who lacked training in economics, was also appointed head of the State Planning Committee in 1950, supervising the work of Soviet and Romanian politicians in creating the framework for a planned economy in Romania.

After the outbreak of PCR inner conflicts between Ana Pauker's "Muscovite wing" and Gheorghiu-Dej's "prison faction", he kept a low profile, and did not take sides, before approving of Gheorghiu-Dej's victory and joining the official delegation that announced it in Moscow (he had also been the one to voice official accusations against Vasile Luca in February 1952).

Surviving Pauker's fall, he personally witnessed the 20th Congress of the Soviet Communist Party and became interested in the Soviet call for De-Stalinization, beginning talks on the topic with Italian Communist Party leader Palmiro Togliatti. In 1956, his Planning Committee reached an agreement with Soviet authorities regarding the dissolution of SovRoms (enterprises which had placed a strain on Romanian economy, having directed its resources to the Soviet Union). Constantinescu was also charged with carrying out Gheorghiu-Dej's program of partial rehabilitation offered to cultural figures such as the writer Tudor Arghezi, the philosopher Lucian Blaga, and the historian Constantin C. Giurescu.

In the aftermath of the 1956 Revolution in Hungary, he was sent to Cluj, in order to exercise tighter control over a region with significant Hungarian population.

=== 1956 clash with Gheorghiu-Dej ===
In 1956, together with the pro-Soviet Iosif Chișinevschi, Constantinescu observed the increasingly hostile relations between Nikita Khrushchev and Gheorghiu-Dej, and ultimately decided to attack the latter in public (identifying him with Stalinism and citing the history of Securitate political violence). The two had been probably encouraged by Khrushchev, and attempted in vain to rally Alexandru Moghioroș to their cause.

Accused of "attempt to direct the party towards liberal anarchy and revisionism", he was nonetheless convoked to express criticism of the writers Alexandru Jar, Mihail Davidoglu and Ion Vitner, all of whom had displayed similar support for reform. Constantinescu was purged by the Party Plenum in June 1957; he was marginalized, but kept his freedom and was allowed to work as a lector for the Pedagogic Institute, and later as a researcher for the Romanian Academy's Institute for Economics and the Nicolae Iorga Institute of History in Bucharest (led by Andrei Oțetea at the time). Active in the revival of sociology studies after the Stalinist period, he was notably engaged with Henri H. Stahl on the Bibliotheca Historica Romaniae research project.

Countering earlier accusations, Gheorghiu-Dej eventually included Constantinescu and Chișinevschi on various lists of "Stalinists", as well as accusing them of having supported the "Muscovite wing" in its alleged actions against the PCR itself. During the 1957 Plenum, as well as in 1961, Nicolae Ceaușescu was fully endorsing Gheorghiu-Dej's theories on the subject, and, initially indicating that, unlike the two opponents, he held Joseph Stalin in esteem, alleged that Constantinescu had little understanding of Marxist principles (although his was, in all likelihood, much less significant).

=== Rehabilitation and later life ===
Following Gheorghiu-Dej's death, Ceaușescu's rise brought a wave of rehabilitations; Constantinescu's own name was cleared upon PCR inquiry which presented its results in April 1968. He was consequently reinstated to the top echelon, and served as Minister of Education for a short period, as well as being elected a member of the Central Committee Secretariat and deputy member of the Executive Political Committee. He later became President of Academy of Social and Political Sciences, Rector of Ștefan Gheorghiu Academy. He was elected vice-president of the State Council in November 1972, a position he will hold concurrently with the office of president of the Great National Assembly, succeeding Ştefan Voitec from 28 March until his death on 18 July.

Until his death, he was forced to cede part of his party status to Ceaușescu, who was officially praised for having reorganized the Union of Communist Youth in 1938, a task which had actually been carried out by Constantinescu.

== Personal life ==
His wife Sulamita, née Bloch, was herself a PCR activist. She died, in 1968, at the hands of Lena, their younger daughter (b. 1949) (sources do not agree on the method used in killing — Sulamita Constantinescu was either hit with a clothes iron or attacked with a knife or a hatchet). Constantinescu's daughter was diagnosed with schizophrenia, and interned at a sanatorium in Câmpina (a gifted artist, she was allowed to continue painting, and exhibited her works on hospital grounds). According to one popular, but unconfirmed, rumor, the two women had been in love with the same unnamed man.

Constantinescu's two sons, both named Horia, suffered tragic deaths in their youth — the first-born died during an appendicectomy; the second-born froze to death while on a trip to the Bucegi Mountains.

Constantinescu and Sulamita also had an older daughter, Ana.

== In fiction ==
Under the name Constant Mironescu, Constantinescu appears in the semi-autobiographical novel Luntrea lui Caron ("Charon's Boat"), written by Lucian Blaga years after he was reinstated by Gheorghiu-Dej (the book was only published posthumously).

Miron Constantinescu's stay in Caransebeș prison and the subsequent investigation became a theme of official PCR propaganda; the 1981 film Convoiul ("The Convoy"), directed by Mircea Mureșan and starring Ion Besoiu, Emil Hossu, and Costel Constantin, was a romanticized depiction of the events.
