= Dumitru Coliu =

Romanian communist activist and politician

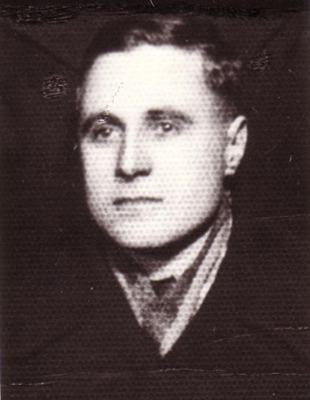

Administrative Secretary General of the Ministry of National Defence
- In office December 27, 1947 – February 1949

Member of the Central Committee of the Romanian Communist Party
- In office 1945–1979

Personal details
- Born: Dimităr Colev; November 7, 1907 Vasilieva, Dobrich Province, Principality of Bulgaria
- Died: 1985 (aged 77–78) Bucharest, Socialist Republic of Romania
- Citizenship: Romanian
- Party: Romanian Communist Party
- Awards: Order of Michael the Brave, 3rd class Order of the Star of the Romanian Socialist Republic, 2nd and 1st class

Dumitru Coliu (born Dimitar Kolev, Romanian: Dimităr Colev, Bulgarian: Димитър Колев; November 7, 1907 – 1985) was a Romanian communist activist and politician.

An ethnic Bulgarian, he was born in Vasilieva village in Southern Dobruja, several years before it became part of Romania. Coliu entered a leather-workers’ union in 1923. In 1925, he joined the banned Romanian Communist Party (PCR). During the 1930s, he was active in the Dobrujan Revolutionary Organisation. He left for the Soviet Union in 1940, spending the World War II years in Moscow with other Romanian communists, and was a devoted collaborator of Ana Pauker's. While there, he was a political officer in the Tudor Vladimirescu Division.

Following the Coup of August 1944, he returned to Romania with the Horea, Cloșca și Crișan Division, and in August 1947 he was awarded the Order of Michael the Brave, 3rd class. In 1948 he was made a major-general in the Land Forces for political reasons. He joined the Central Committee of the PCR in 1945, remaining until 1979. Coliu was military attaché to the Soviet Union in 1949-1951. He was elected a candidate member of the Politburo in 1952, alongside Alexandru Drăghici and Nicolae Ceaușescu, holding that post until 1969. He sat in the Great National Assembly from 1948 to 1980, heading its foreign affairs committee from 1953 to 1955.

Under Gheorghe Gheorghiu-Dej, between 1955 and 1965, he was president of the State Control Commission and of the Party Control Commission, seconded by Ion Vincze. The party's professional interrogator as part of repressive actions initiated by the Securitate secret police, he took over the latter post in 1960 as Constantin Pîrvulescu was purged for his silence several years earlier in a plot to unseat Gheorghiu-Dej. By 1961, the Comintern veteran was among those advocating a turn toward national communism. He left his control commission post in 1969. Coliu was a hardliner within the leadership of the PCR, an unconditional follower of Joseph Stalin and of Stalinism.

His wife Olga was a Soviet citizen whom he married while in Moscow. His awards included the Order of the Star of the Romanian Socialist Republic, second class (1948) and first class (1957).
