= Petre Borilă =

Romanian politician

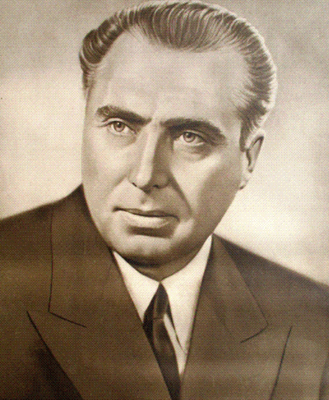
Petre Borilă

Petre Borilă (born Iordan Dragan Rusev; Bulgarian: Йордан Драган Русев, Yordan Dragan Rusev; 13 February 1906 – 2 January 1973) was a Romanian communist politician who briefly served as Vice-Premier under the Communist regime. A member of the Romanian Communist Party (PCR) since his late teens, he was a political commissar in the Spanish Civil War and a Comintern cadre afterwards, spending World War II in exile in the Soviet Union. Borilă returned to Romania during the late 1940s, and rose to prominence under Communist rule, when he was a member of the PCR's Central Committee and Politburo.

Initially close to the faction formed around Ana Pauker and Vasile Luca, Borilă rallied with their adversary Gheorghe Gheorghiu-Dej, thus ensuring his own political survival. He subsequently endorsed the official policies, and played a part in ousting Gheorghiu-Dej's newly found rival, Iosif Chișinevschi, but was progressively marginalized after Nicolae Ceaușescu emerged as Romania's ruler in 1965. Objecting to Ceaușescu's nationalism, he also had a notorious personal conflict with the new leader, after the latter's son Valentin married Borilă's daughter.

== Biography ==
Borilă was born to ethnic Bulgarian parents in the Southern Dobrujan city of Silistra, which was at the time part of the Principality of Bulgaria (de jure under the Ottoman Empire) and, between 1913 and 1940, part of the Kingdom of Romania. He joined the newly outlawed Romanian Communist Party (PCR) in 1924, and became known under his adoptive name, at some point in the 1930s. The party appointed him commissar with the International Brigades fighting for the Republican side in Spain, whence he returned after the Nationalist victory.

During World War II, Petre Borilă resided in the Soviet Union, where he was still present as Romania joined the Axis powers in the 1941 invasion. He worked for the Comintern before its 1943 dissolution, being a personal collaborator to its leaders, Georgi Dimitrov and Dmitry Manuilsky. At the time, he also had close contacts with other prominent Romanian communist exiles, including Luca, Pauker, Leonte Răutu, and Valter Roman — this nucleus – "the Muscovite faction" – representing a distinct group inside the PCR, planned to take over the entire party upon their return to Romania. In this, they were opposed by the "prison faction", whose members, including its leader Gheorghe Gheorghiu-Dej, had been arrested and were serving time in Romania. According to historian Vladimir Tismăneanu, Borilă had grown aware that support for his faction was fragile, and, in order to ensure his political survival, chose to always maintain close contacts with Gheorghiu-Dej.

Borilă returned to Romania with the Red Army after the Soviet occupation in August 1944. As the Luca-Pauker group ensured a main role in leading the reunited PCR (known for a while afterwards as the Romanian Workers' Party, or PMR), he himself rose to prominence: following the establishment of a Communist regime (1947), he was a member of the Central Committee (1948–1969) and of the Politburo (1952–1965). He was also among those charged with politically supervising its new secret police, the Securitate. During the early 1950s, he and fellow PCR members (Dumitru Coliu and Ion Vincze) organized political repression through a series of violent measures.

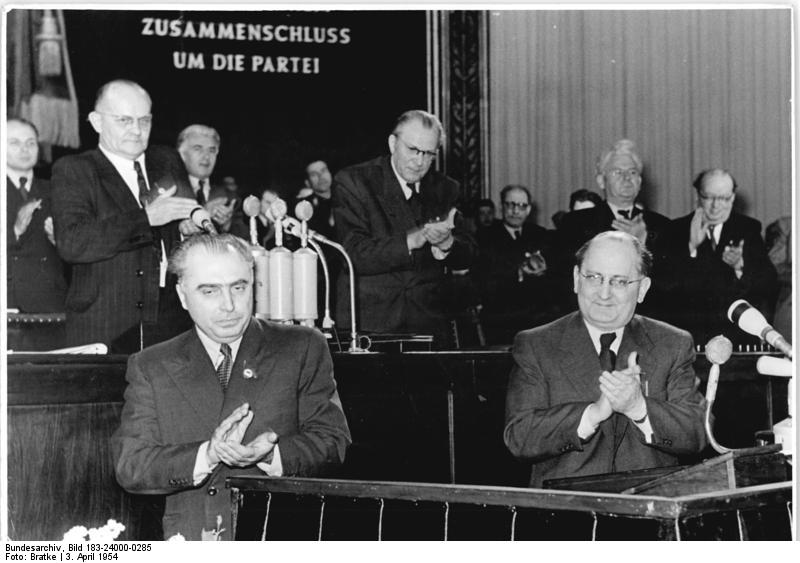
Borilă (at front left) in East Germany, 1954

Reputedly, his relations with Pauker and Luca grew tense as early as 1950, when the former two began a campaign aimed at removing Spanish Civil War volunteers from the PMR leadership, in view of subjecting them to a show trial. At the time, Gheorghe Vasilichi and Valter Roman were singled out as "spies", and Borilă himself seems to have been considered as a victim of the purge. His renewed contacts with Gheorghiu-Dej were taken as a sign that the International Brigades veterans were ready to play a role in ousting the Pauker–Luca faction, and as such granted protection by the other main group.

In 1952, Borilă aligned with other PMR leaders and facilitated the fall of the Pauker-Luca faction (initiated by Vasile Luca's arrest). He remained a relatively important figure during Gheorghiu-Dej's supremacy, serving as Vice-Premier in 1954–1965.

In 1956, he was, alongside Gheorghiu-Dej, Miron Constantinescu, and Iosif Chișinevschi, one of Romania's delegates to the famous 20th Congress of the Soviet Communist Party, where, to their surprise, Nikita Khrushchev condemned Joseph Stalin and announced a path to De-Stalinization. As a consequence of this move, Gheorghiu-Dej made a claim to have De-Stalinized the PCR years before Khrushchev, and linked Stalinism exclusively to the fallen Pauker-Luca faction: Petre Borilă played a significant part in this process, rallying with the Romanian leader as the latter purged the PMR of members who advocated increased liberalization. Later in the same year, together with Gheorghiu-Dej, Vincze, Constantin Pîrvulescu, and Alexandru Moghioroș, he engaged in talks with Pauker, who was by then released from detention and placed under close Securitate surveillance — they attempted to have her confess to political crimes, but she defiantly continued to deny the bulk of the charges.

Despite the ideological conflict between the PCR and Khrushchev, Romania supported Soviet intervention against the 1956 Revolution in Hungary, and Gheorghiu-Dej agreed to have dissident Hungarian leader Imre Nagy kept under arrest in Snagov. Alongside Valter Roman, Nicolae Goldberger, and others, Borilă came to Snagov and played a personal part in pressuring Nagy and other members of his fallen cabinet to confess (1957). During the following years, he backed Gheorghiu-Dej in his conflict with Chișinevschi and Miron Constantinescu, both of whom were ousted from the PMR leadership after being publicly exposed to criticism. This was especially the case during a 1961 plenum meeting of the Workers' Party, when he voiced harsh criticism of Chișinevschi, but also Pauker and Luca, whom he depicted as enforcers of Soviet directives.

Between 1965 and 1969, under Romania's new leader, Nicolae Ceaușescu, he was a member of the executive committee (the reformed Politburo of the PCR, as the latter discarded its PMR name). Nevertheless, he came to clash with Ceaușescu over various issues, the most important of which being the open encouragement of nationalism and claims of independence inside the Eastern Bloc (policies to which the pro-Soviet Borilă was strongly opposed).

A particular point of contention between Ceaușescu and Borilă was the personal life of their children. Borilă, who was married to Ecaterina Abraham, a Romanian communist of Jewish origin, was father to Iordana (or Dana), who fell in love with and married Ceaușescu's oldest son, Valentin. Both families objected to their wedding, and their relations grew notably tense.

== Legacy ==
According to Vladimir Tismăneanu, Petre Borilă had gained an ill notoriety for being involved in "the most secretive of political affairs", and was considered "a distant and suspicious figure". Tismăneanu also referred to Borilă as a "Soviet agent", who, alongside Iosif Chișinevschi, was used by Gheorghiu-Dej to supervise lower-ranking PCR members and enforce a local variant of Stalinism (while ensuring close links with Soviet officials). His reelection in the 1954 Politburo after Ana Pauker's fall was seen as a sign of his importance and close relation to Gheorghiu-Dej. Both he and Valter Roman enforced their commitment to the new leader in 1961, when they publicly claimed that their survival was entirely owed to his victory in the inner-party clash.

Shortly before his death, Borilă reportedly authored a letter condemning Ceaușescu, who was by then President, for "nationalism". According to dissident Mircea Răceanu, whose father Grigore Răceanu was a prominent PCR member, the document was known to party officials, but was deliberately not made public.

The negative reaction to the Valentin Ceaușescu – Iordana Borilă marriage was believed by commentators to be a reflection of xenophobia on the part of Nicolae Ceaușescu's wife, Elena Ceaușescu (an ethnic Romanian, she allegedly resented the non-Romanian origins of her in-laws). Such views were rejected by Andrei Lupu, a person close to the Ceaușescus, whose parents were important members of the PCR — Lupu argued that the two families did not get along on account of Petre Borilă's aloofness. On the other hand, Petre Borilă himself is known to have opposed their wedding, probably due to Nicolae Ceaușescu's ideology. In a 2007 interview, Constantin Roguschi, who was employed as an architect by the dictator, claimed that Iordana Borilă was not allowed to set foot in any house owned by Nicolae and Elena Ceaușescu.

The couple eventually divorced in 1988, one year before the Romanian Revolution toppled and executed Nicolae and Elena Ceaușescu. In the early 1990s, Iordana, together with Daniel Ceaușescu, her son by Valentin, emigrated to Israel and later on to the United States. Daniel is the former dictator's only grandson (see Ceaușescu family).
