= Alexandru Moghioroș =

Austro-Hungarian-born Romanian-Soviet politician (1898–1963)

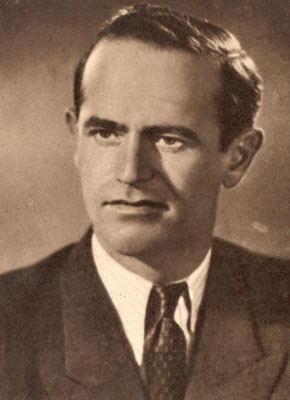

Vice Prime Minister of Romania
- In office 1954–1965
- Prime Minister: Gheorghe Gheorghiu-Dej; Chivu Stoica; Ion Gheorghe Maurer

RPC Central Committee Secretary
- In office 1948–1954
- In office 1965–1969

Member of the Great National Assembly
- In office 1948–1969

Personal details
- Born: 23 October 1911 Nagyszalonta, Austria-Hungary
- Died: 1 October 1969 (aged 57) Bucharest, Romanian People's Republic
- Resting place: Carol Park Mausoleum (since then moved)
- Party: Romanian Communist Party
- Spouse: Stela Moghioroș
- Awards: Order of the "August 23"; Order of Labour

Alexandru Moghioroș (Hungarian: Mogyorós Sándor; 23 October 1911 – 1 October 1969) was a Romanian communist activist and politician.

Moghioroș was born in 1911 into an ethnic Hungarian family, in Nagyszalonta, Austria-Hungary, now Salonta, Bihor County, Romania. A worker who joined the Romanian Communist Party (PCR; later PMR) when it was banned, he was tried by the authorities of the Kingdom of Romania at Craiova alongside Ana Pauker and spent time in prison at Jilava, Doftana, and Caransebeș. While in detention, he grew close to future leader Gheorghe Gheorghiu-Dej, becoming part of a nucleus that would later be at the party's forefront. When Gheorghiu-Dej began, by 1950, to move to consolidate his undisputed leadership of the party, he named the trusted Moghioroș to stand guard over and watch for chauvinism in the activities of Vasile Luca, another high-ranking ethnic Hungarian targeted for purging. He sat on the party's central committee (1945–1968), its political bureau (1948–1965) and its political executive committee or CPEx (1965–1968). He was deputy prime minister during 1954 and from 1957 to 1965. As the central committee's secretary for organizational matters during the 1950s, he was one of the architects of the Pauker–Vasile Luca group's fall in May–June 1952. He was the de facto overseer of cadre policy and was involved in the collectivization process.

In mid-1950, Moghioroș replaced Pauker to become party supervisor of the Agriculture Ministry's agrarian section. A year earlier, at a politburo discussion, he was the only member who did not grant even token acknowledgment to the idea that collectivization should happen gradually or cautiously, condemning the "opportunist-conciliatory line" as "non-Leninist, because we can't build socialism without collective farms". Once in charge, he sharply criticized Pauker's more lenient approach, holding nightly meetings with officials to decide on new collective farms and ordering a scaled-down plan for the spring be accelerated during the summer of 1950. Around 1957, Moghioroș decided that Romania did not have more cattle because the best hay was fed to horses. Consequently, he ordered a horse slaughter that claimed some 800,000 animals, which had disastrous consequences in agriculture. At the time, horses were still the predominant means of rural transport, and tractors could not be used on farms with clay soil because they became stuck. In addition, by closing the stables at Mangalia, Făgăraș, Bonțida and Rușețu, he sharply reduced the country's variety of horse breeds.

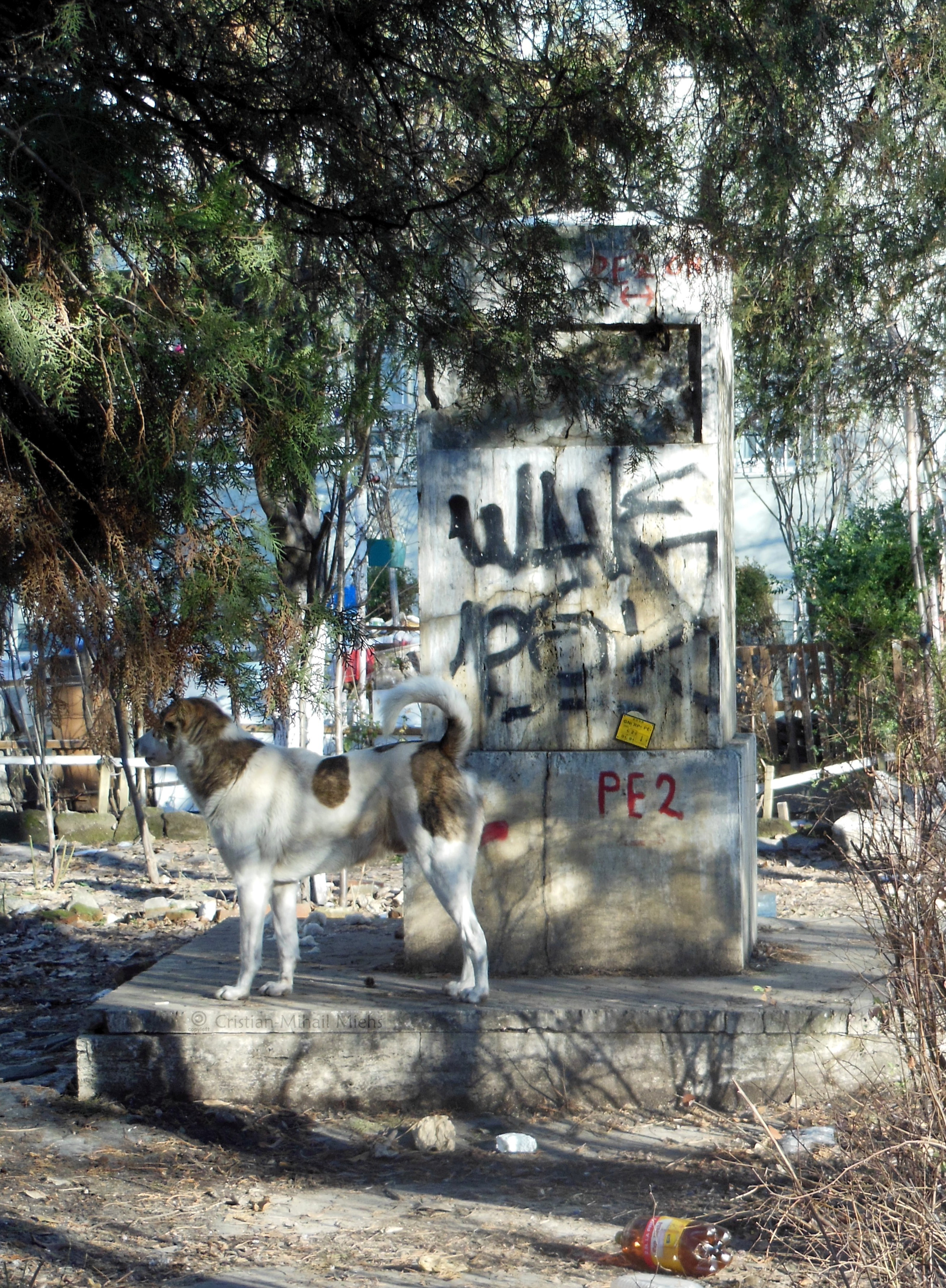
The pedestal on which, until 1989, was the bust of Moghioroș, in Bucharest

In 1956, following the 20th Congress of the Communist Party of the Soviet Union, some within the PMR, notably Miron Constantinescu and Iosif Chișinevschi, called for a change in direction that would have threatened Gheorghiu-Dej's position. At the time, Moghioroș was among the latter's main allies, along with Gheorghe Apostol, Emil Bodnăraș and Petre Borilă. Constantinescu approached Moghioroș in an attempt to enlist him on his side, which prompted Moghioroș to go to Gheorghiu-Dej immediately and inform him that an "antiparty platform" had arisen. As with Borilă, Gheorghiu-Dej's successor Nicolae Ceaușescu removed Moghioroș from the party's top body, the permanent presidium, under the pretext of his disease.

His wife Stela (born Esther Radoșovețkaia) was also a longtime party activist and represented the PMR on the editorial board of the Cominform journal For a Lasting Peace, for Popular Democracy.

Moghioroș died in Bucharest in 1969 and was buried in one of the crypts of the chamber surrounding the "Monument of the Heroes of the Struggle for the Freedom of the People and the Fatherland, for Socialism," now known as the Carol Park Mausoleum. In 1991, after the Romanian Revolution, his remains were exhumed and interred elsewhere.
