= List of people executed in Romania =

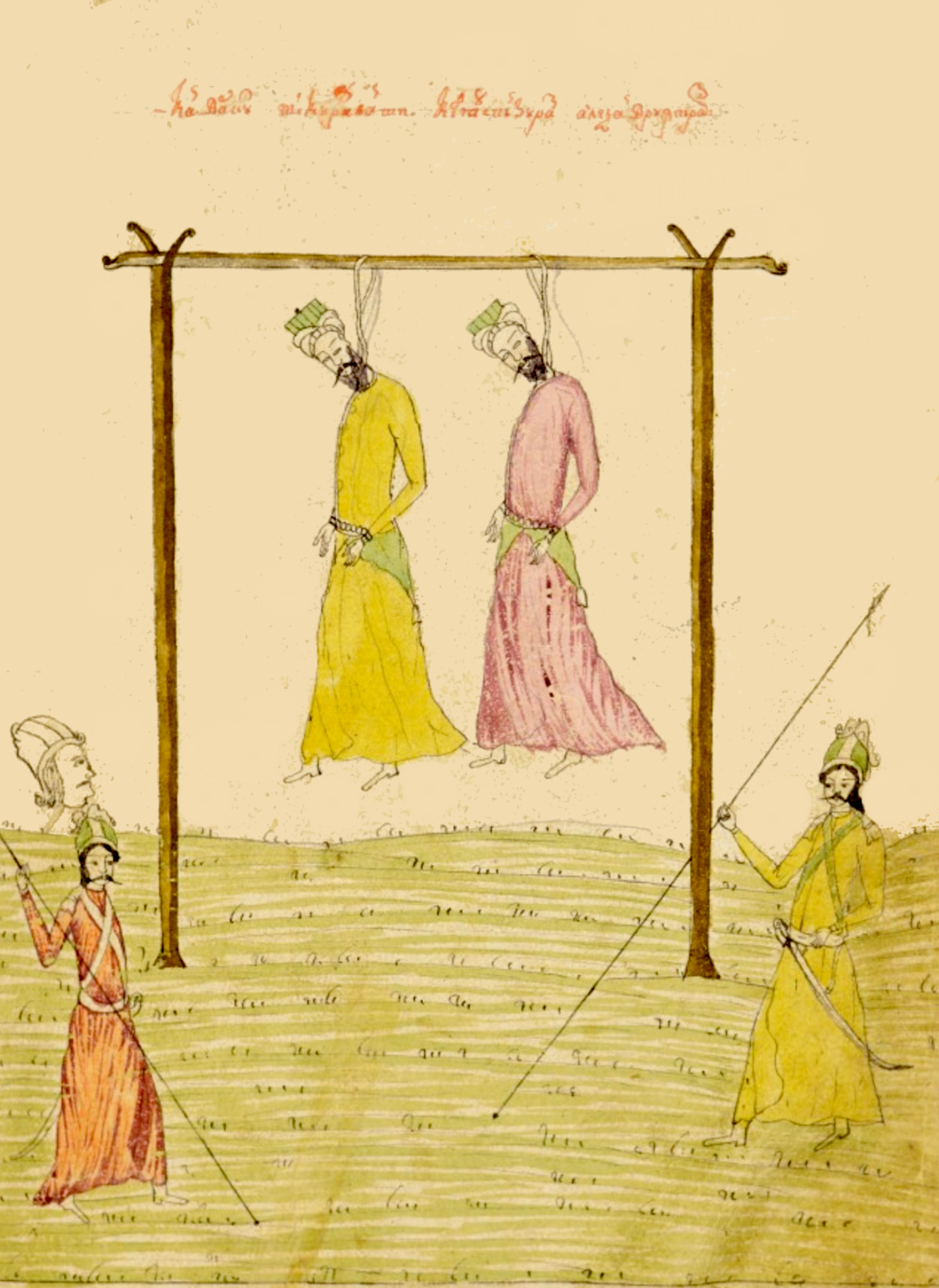
Hanging scene by the Moldavian scribe Năstase Negrule, in a 1790 copy of the Alexander Romance

This is a list of people executed in Romania. The list includes judicial executions carried out on the territory of present-day Romania, whether by that state or its antecedents.

== Earlier jurisdictions ==
- Kingdom of Hungary (1301–1526)
  - György Dózsa, peasant revolt leader, July 20, 1514
- Principality of Transylvania (1570–1711)
  - Sándor Kendi, anti-Habsburg noble, August 30, 1594
  - Balthasar Báthory, anti-Habsburg noble, September 11, 1594
  - Farkas Kovacsóczy, anti-Habsburg noble, September 11, 1594
  - István Jósika, statesman, September 11, 1598
  - Starina Novak, prisoner of war, February 5, 1601

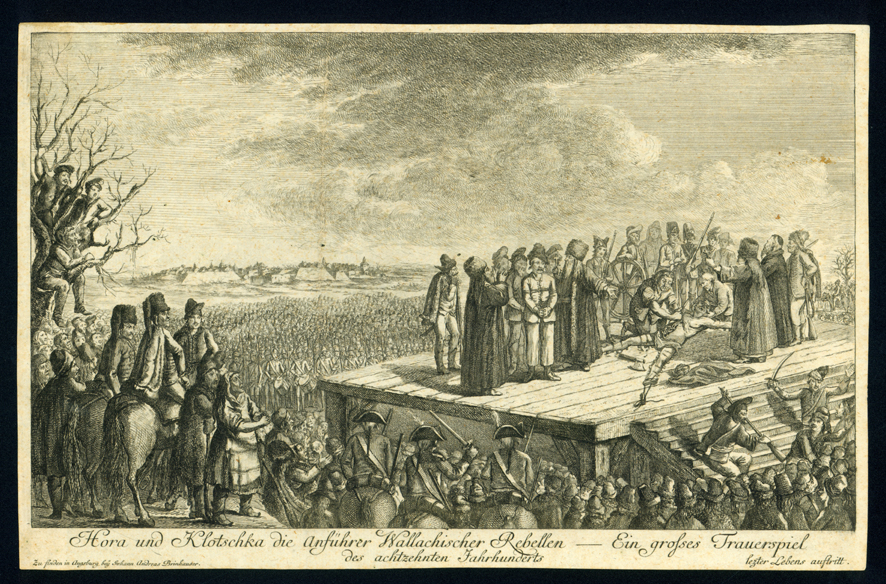
The execution of Horea and Cloșca in Alba Iulia, February 28, 1785

- Habsburg monarchy
  - Horea and Cloșca, leaders of the Revolt of Horea, Cloșca and Crișan, February 28, 1785
  - Norbert Ormay, colonel in the 1848 revolution, August 22, 1849
  - The 13 Martyrs of Arad, generals in the 1848 revolution, October 6, 1849
- Moldavia
  - Luca Arbore, diplomat, April 1523
  - Bartolomeo Bruti, diplomat, 1591
  - Andronikos Kantakouzenos, statesman, 1601
  - Nichifor Beldiman, statesman, c. 1616
  - Alexandru Coci, statesman, 1653
  - Vasile Gheuca and Gavril Costachi, statesmen, 1680
  - Manolache Bogdan and Ioniță Cuza, statesmen, August 18, 1778
- Wallachia
  - Udrea Băleanu, statesman, c. May 1601
  - Leca of Cătun, statesman, February or March 1616
  - Hrizea of Bogdănei, pretender, April to September 1657
  - Istratie Leurdeanu, statesman, 1658
  - Diicul Buicescul, pretender, July 1659
  - Constantin I Cantacuzino, statesman, 1663
  - Staico Bucșanu, statesman, June 7, 1693
- Ottoman Empire
  - Lupu Mehedințeanu, statesman, 1618
  - Constantine Hangerli, Prince of Wallachia, February 18, 1799
- Hungarian State
  - Stephan Ludwig Roth, 1848 revolutionary, May 11, 1849
  - Ioan Buteanu, 1848 revolutionary, May 23, 1849
- Austria-Hungary
  - Emil Rebreanu, military officer, May 14, 1917

== Kingdom of Romania ==
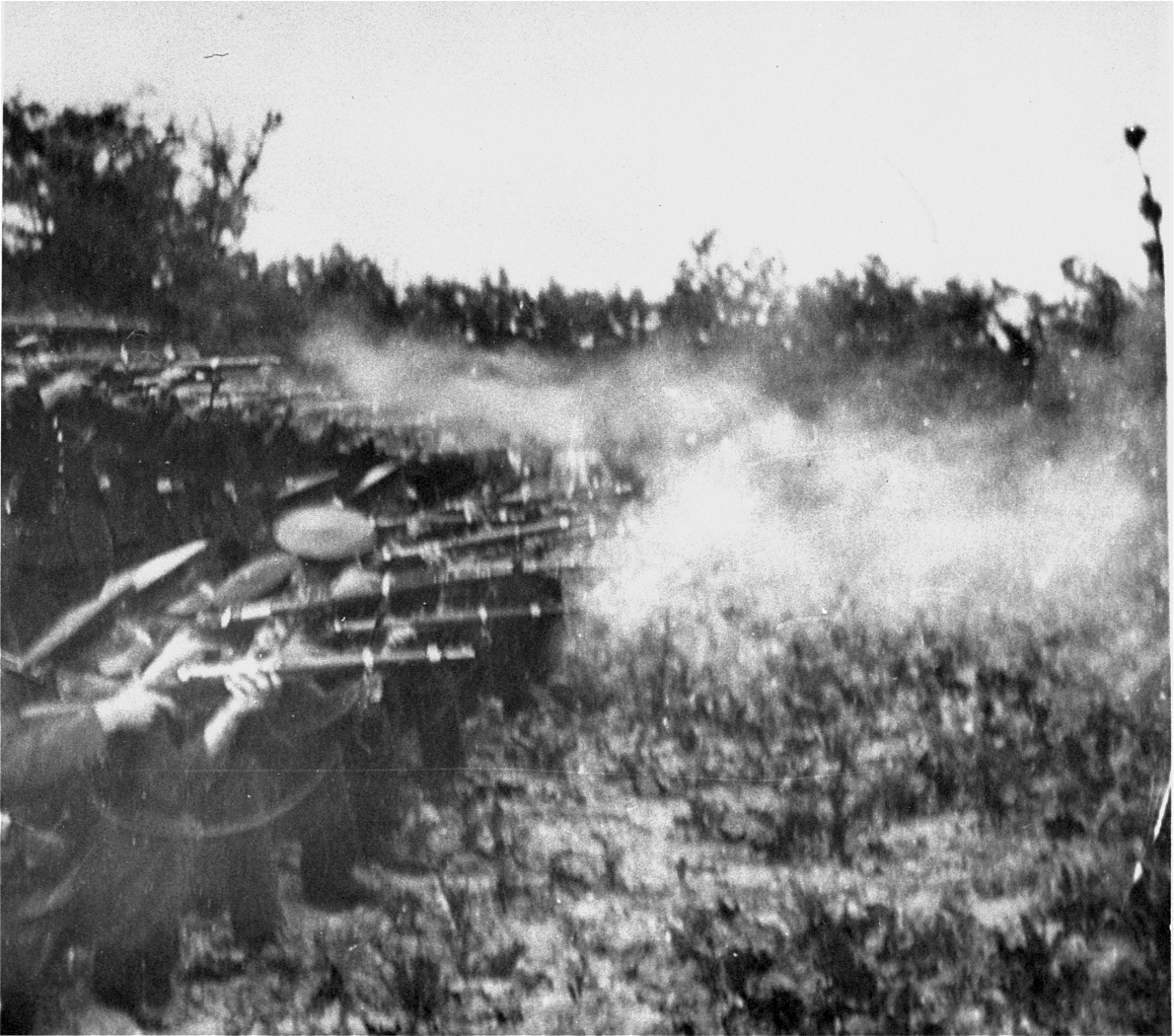
Execution of Ion Antonescu, Mihai Antonescu, Gheorghe Alexianu, and Constantin Vasiliu at Jilava Prison, June 1, 1946

- Filimon Sârbu, communist activist and anti-fascist militant, July 19, 1941
- Francisc Panet, communist activist, November 7, 1941
- Pompiliu Ștefu, communist activist and anti-fascist militant, March 28, 1942
- Nicolae Mohănescu, socialist activist and anti-fascist militant, 1942
- Petre Gheorghe, communist activist and anti-fascist militant, February 8, 1943
- Ion Antonescu, World War II-era dictator, June 1, 1946
- Mihai Antonescu, foreign minister under Ion Antonescu, June 1, 1946
- Gheorghe Alexianu, governor of Transnistria, June 1, 1946
- Constantin Vasiliu, general and Gendermarie commander, June 1, 1946

== Communist period ==
- Nicolae Dabija, anti-communist resistance fighter (together with 6 other members of his group), October 28, 1949
- Remus Koffler, communist activist, April 17, 1954
- Lucrețiu Pătrășcanu, purged justice minister, April 17, 1954
- Eugen Țurcanu, Pitești Prison figure, December 17, 1954
- Iosif Capotă, anti-communist resistance fighter, September 2, 1958
- Toma Arnăuțoiu, anti-communist resistance fighter (together with his brother and 14 other members of his group), July 18, 1959
- Oliviu Beldeanu, lead participant in the 1955 seizure of the Romanian embassy in Bern, February 18, 1960
- Ioanid Gang, group of five bank robbers, 1960
- Gheorghe Arsenescu, anti-communist resistance fighter, May 29, 1962
- Ion Rîmaru, serial killer, October 23, 1971
- Gheorghe Ștefănescu, businessman convicted of economic crimes, December 14, 1981
- Ion Pistol, convicted murderer, May 12, 1987
- Vasile Trifan, convicted murderer, May 13, 1987

== Romanian Revolution ==
- Nicolae Ceaușescu, dictator, December 25, 1989
- Elena Ceaușescu, wife of Nicolae, December 25, 1989

== See also ==
- Capital punishment in Romania
