= Capital punishment in Romania =

Europe holds the greatest concentration of abolitionist states (blue). Map current as of 2022 Abolished for all offences Abolished in practice Retains capital punishment

Capital punishment in Romania was abolished in 1990, and has been prohibited by the Constitution of Romania since 1991.

== Antecedents ==
The death penalty has a long and varied history in present-day Romania. Vlad the Impaler (reigned in Wallachia, principally 1456–62) was notorious for executing thousands by impalement. One of his successors, Constantine Hangerli, was strangled, shot, stabbed and beheaded by the Ottomans in 1799. In Moldavia, the earliest reference to executions is found in a 1646 text from the time of Vasile Lupu, while in Wallachia, a similar mention from 1652 dates to Matei Basarab's reign. Both stipulate that particularly serious offenses such as treason, patricide or abduction of women merit execution. Only the metropolitan could grant clemency, provided the condemned either lost his land to the church or, together with his family, became its serf.

In the Wallachian capital Bucharest, men condemned for theft, counterfeiting, treason, for being pretenders or haiduks, their sentence hanging around their necks, would be taken in oxcarts from Curtea Veche along Calea Moşilor (then called Podul Târgului de Afară, or "Bridge of the Outside Market") to the marketplace in question. The bodies of the hanged would be left in place for a long period as food for crows. Anton Maria Del Chiaro, writing in 1718, noted that at every tavern along the way, the women inside would emerge with cups of wine, asking the man to drink deeply so he would not be afraid to die. If his mother or wife accompanied him, they too would urge him to drink, and at the time of hanging he would be dizzy and unaware of what was happening. The public marketplace executions were banned by Grigore IV Ghica (1822–1828). The first debates on complete abolition had taken place in the mid-18th century, the most vocal supporter being Constantin Mavrocordat, who ruled four times in Moldavia and six in Wallachia between 1730 and 1769. However, a rise in crime in the early 19th century led to a revival of the practice. In Wallachia, the Caragea Law of 1818 provided executions for premeditated murder, counterfeiting money, manslaughter with a weapon and robbery. In Moldavia, the Callimachi Code of 1817 allowed the death penalty for homicide, patricide, robbery, poisoning and arson. Leaders of the Wallachian Revolution of 1848 called for abolition in the Islaz Proclamation and soon issued a decree to the effect. Their Moldavian counterparts were less focused on the issue, with only Mihail Kogălniceanu bringing up abolition in his proposed constitution. After the revolutions were crushed, the ruling princes maintained the death penalty: it is mentioned in the Penal Codes both of Wallachia's Barbu Dimitrie Știrbei and of Moldavia's Grigore Alexandru Ghica.

Two of the leaders of the Revolt of Horea, Cloşca and Crişan were broken on the wheel by the Imperial Austrian authorities (who then controlled Transylvania) in 1785. Liviu Rebreanu's 1922 novel Pădurea spânzuraţilor ("Forest of the Hanged"), as well as its 1965 film adaptation, draws upon the experience of his brother Emil, hanged for desertion in 1917, shortly before Austria-Hungary dissolved and Transylvania united with Romania.

== Kingdom of Romania ==
The modern Romanian state was formed in 1859 after the unification of the Danubian Principalities, and a Penal Code was enacted in 1864 that did not provide for the death penalty except for several wartime offences. The 1866 Constitution, inspired by the liberal Belgian model of 1831, confirmed the abolition of capital punishment for peacetime crimes. By the end of the 19th century, just six other European countries had abolished the death penalty: Belgium, Finland, Italy, Luxembourg, the Netherlands and Portugal, as well as the tiny Republic of San Marino.

Abolition with respect to peacetime crimes was reaffirmed by article 16 of the 1923 Constitution. However, the rising crime rate had produced a shift in favour of capital punishment. The new Criminal Code of 1936 incorporated some sections of the Law despite the drafters' opposition to capital punishment. The 1938 Constitution, which established a royal dictatorship, expanded the scope of capital crimes by authorizing the death penalty for offences against the royal family, against high-ranking public figures, for politically motivated murders, and for killings caused during burglaries. The Penal Code was subsequently amended to implement the constitutional mandate. Under the dictatorship of Ion Antonescu, criminal laws became even more repressive. Burglary, theft of weapons, arson, smuggling, and several other crimes were made capital. Also during the period, capital punishment was used as a tool of political repression against some Romanian Communist Party members and anti-German resistance fighters. Examples include Francisc Panet and Filimon Sârbu. According to writer Marius Mircu, thirty anti-fascists were executed during the war, of whom all but three were Jews.

== Communist Romania ==
Two statutes dealing with war crimes were passed in 1945; the following year, Antonescu and three of his followers were executed by firing squad. According to the military archives, between 1949 and 1963, largely corresponding with the rule of Gheorghe Gheorghiu-Dej, 260 people were executed in Romania, including Lucreţiu Pătrăşcanu, Eugen Ţurcanu, the Ioanid Gang, Oliviu Beldeanu (the leader of the group that seized the Romanian embassy in Bern, Switzerland, in 1955), members of the anti-communist resistance movement and protesters during the Hungarian Revolution of 1956. These executions came about following the 1949 Death Penalty Law defining offences against the communist state and the planned economy, modified by several decrees throughout the 1950s. They provided for the death penalty for some crimes against the state, peace and humanity. Large-scale embezzlement causing serious damage to the national economy was added to the list of crimes eligible for execution by decree 202/1953 while in 1957, the death penalty for aggravated murder was introduced into the Penal Code for the first time under communism.

The propagandistic use was centered on the publicity of the legal provisions and not on particular cases. Counting first on the specific deterrent effect of the executions, the regime used the death penalty mainly to eliminate fascists, saboteurs, traitors or members of the resistance groups, etc. Although it could also directly eliminate them, the authorities decided to follow the legal procedures. This was meant to provide the appearance of legality that aimed to improve the regime's image and also had a general deterrent feature. Although leading jurists debated and attempted to abolish capital punishment in 1956, legal provisions and actual use tightened in 1958 when the Stalinist ruler Gheorghiu-Dej initiated a new wave of repressions.

In 1958, the act of contacting foreigners in order to provoke the state into neutrality or an act of war was made subject to the death penalty; this was a clear reference to measures taken by Imre Nagy during the Hungarian Revolution of 1956 and was made more urgent by the withdrawal of Soviet occupying forces that summer, which led the regime to clamp down on internal dissent. The definition of "economic sabotage" and "hooliganism" was broadened by the decree no, 318/1958, and a fierce campaign against economic criminality lasted for the following two years with 87 executions recorded, 28 of them for embezzlement only.

The period after the penal reform in 1969 was particularly linked to the personality of Nicolae Ceauşescu. The legal provisions, as they were explained to the wider public, were developed in the spirit of claims about the regime's humanitarianism, and thus blamed the violent repression specific to the Stalinist period. The dream of an ideological abolition is recycled through a discourse on the natural disappearance of the death penalty accompanying the construction of the New Man and the decrease in criminality in general. This ideological discussion had no connection with the tight legal framework, and even less with its interpretation and the politicized use of capital punishment. The politicization of capital punishment can be observed if one looks at its inconsistent use, dependent on various deterrent campaigns disseminated by the propaganda machine.

The new Penal Code adopted in 1969 featured 28 capital offences, including economic and property crimes. This number was substantially reduced in the 1970s. From 1969 to 1989, 98 death sentences were carried out; among those executed during this period were Ion Rîmaru and Gheorghe Ştefănescu. Most death penalty convictions were handed down for murder, but some were for large-scale theft of state property. For instance, in 1983–1984, 19 individuals were sentenced to death for theft from public property (mainly large quantities of meat) all of them benefiting from a reprieve.

During Ceauşescu's entire time in power (1965–89), 104 people were executed by firing squad at Jilava and Rahova prisons, with commutations reinforcing his image as a stern but kind father to the nation. At Jilava, prisoners were taken outside, to the right side of the prison, tied to a post and shot by six, ten or even twelve junior officers, while at Rahova, they were shot in an underground room; the entire process was shrouded in secrecy. Executions normally happened days after an appeal was rejected, and those shot at Jilava were usually buried in the village cemetery. Minors, pregnant women and women with children aged under 3 were exempt from the death penalty. The death of Ion Pistol, shot for aggravated homicide in May 1987, marked the country's last regular execution. Romania's last executions were those of Ceaușescu himself and his wife Elena; following the overthrow of the regime in the Romanian Revolution, they were subjected to a show trial and then shot by a firing squad on 25 December 1989. Elena Ceaușescu was the only woman executed in modern Romania.

== Romania since 1989 ==
On 7 January 1990, shortly after the Ceauşescus were summarily shot, the leaders of the National Salvation Front abolished the death penalty by decree; some Romanians saw this as a way for former Communists to escape punishment and demanded reinstatement of the death penalty in a series of protests in January 1990. In response, the leadership scheduled a referendum on the question for 28 January, but cancelled the vote ten days before it was to take place. On 27 February 1991, Romania ratified the Second Optional Protocol to the International Covenant (Law nr. 7/1991). The constitution, ratified that December, explicitly prohibited the death penalty; the prohibition was retained when an updated version of the constitution was adopted in 2003. The Constitution provides that no amendment is allowed if it were to result in the suppression of fundamental rights and freedoms, which has been interpreted to mean that the death penalty may not be reinstated as long as the present constitution is in force. Romania is also subject to the European Convention on Human Rights (since May 1994) and the Charter of Fundamental Rights of the European Union (since January 2007), both abolitionist documents. Ahead of the 2000 presidential election, Corneliu Vadim Tudor, who finished in second place, made reintroduction of capital punishment a major plank of his campaign.

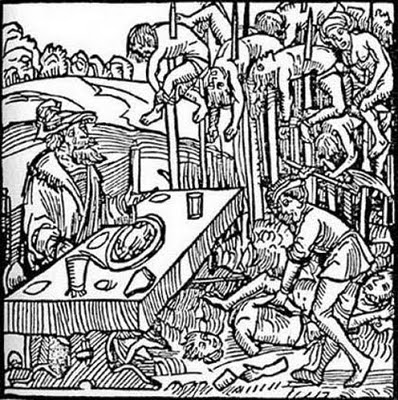
Impalements taking place around Prince Vlad

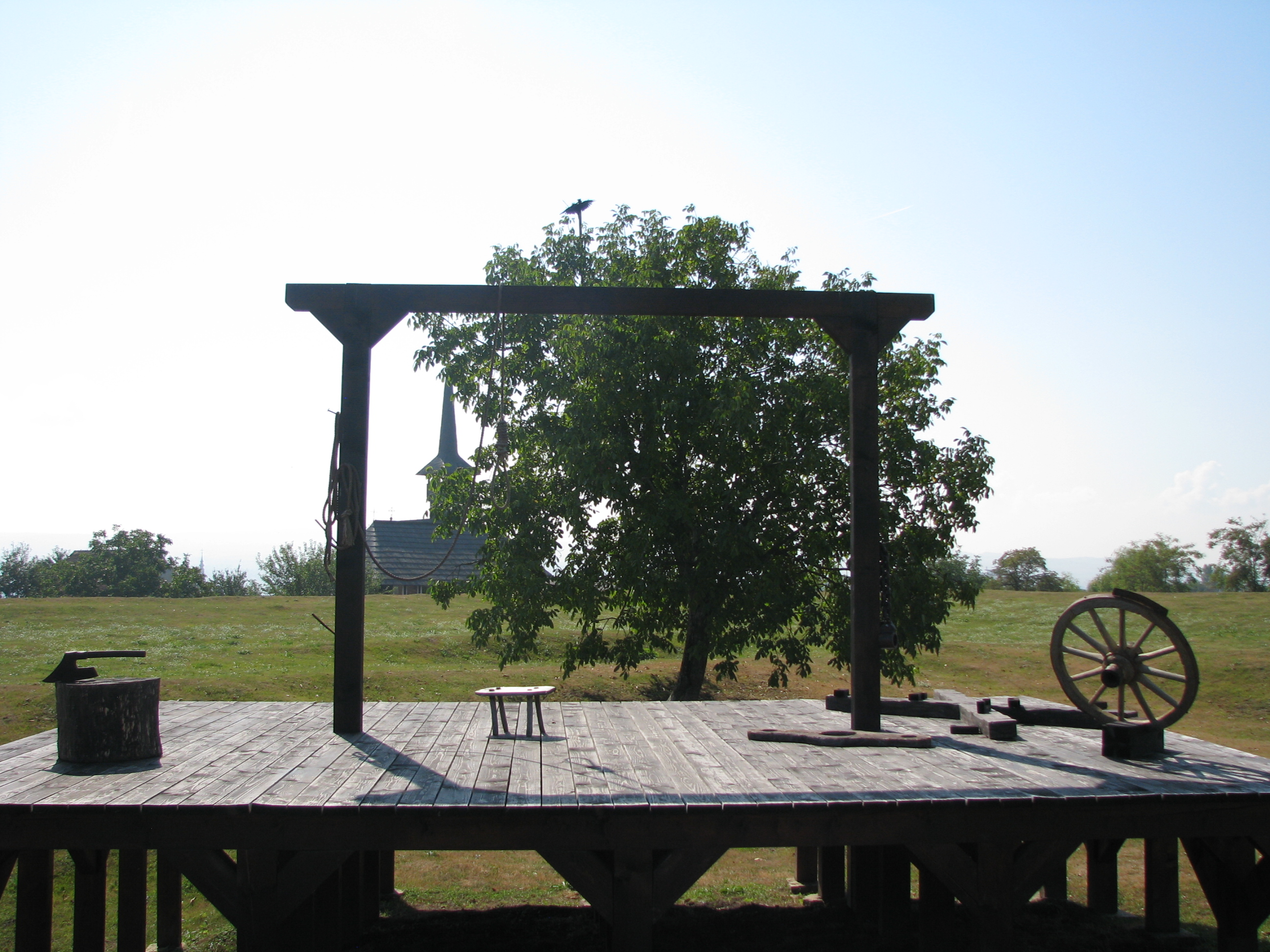
Site where Horea and Cloşca were executed

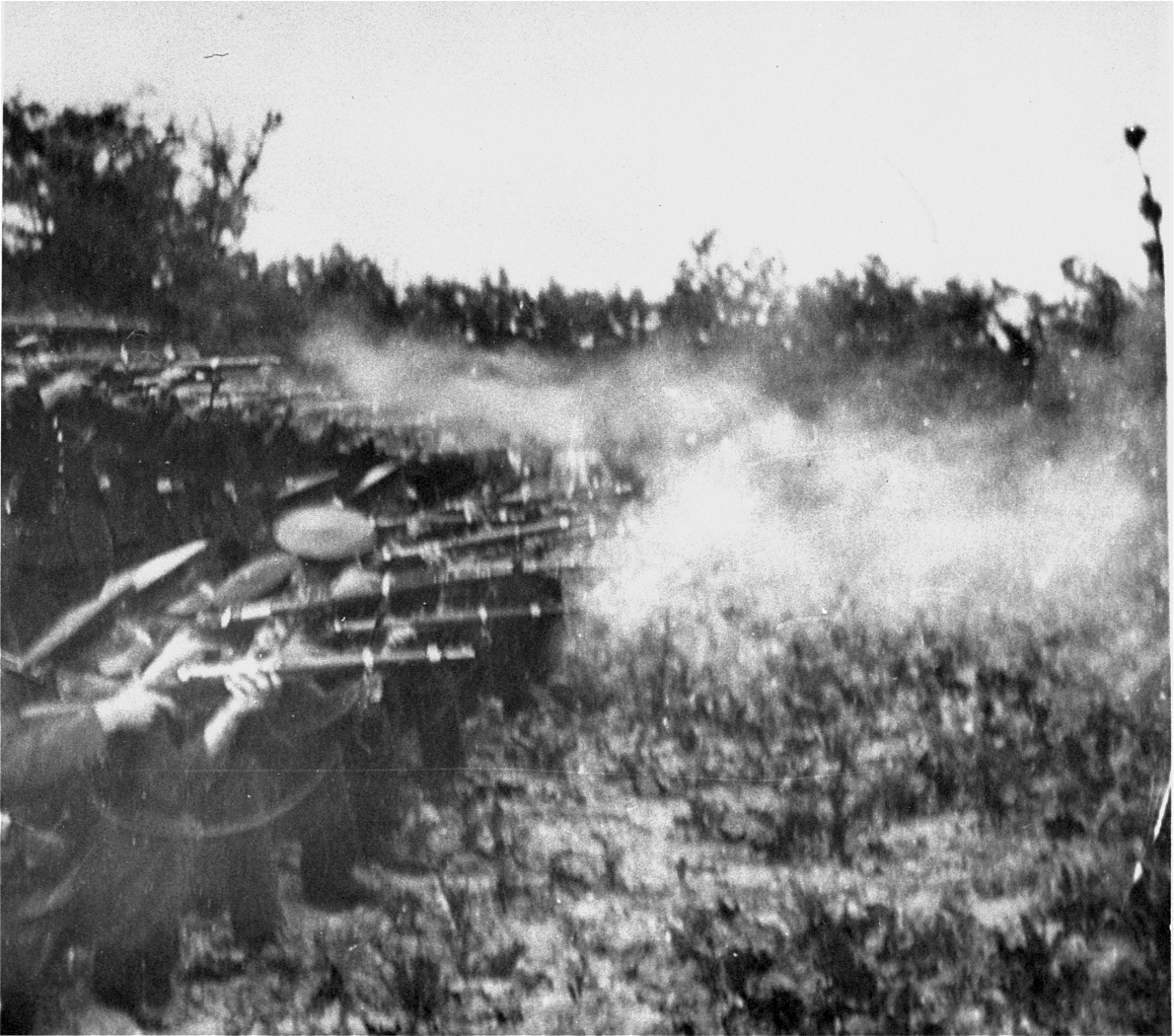
Ion Antonescu being shot by firing squad

== See also ==
- Capital punishment in Europe
- List of people executed in Romania
