= Alexandru Drăghici =

Romanian communist activist and politician (1913–1993)

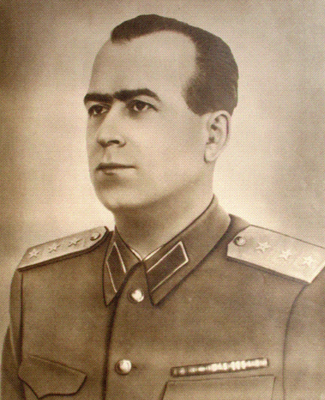
- Drăghici in uniform

Ministrer of Internal Affairs
- In office 28 May 1952 – 20 September 1952
- Preceded by: Teohari Georgescu
- Succeeded by: Pavel Ștefan
- In office 19 March 1957 – 27 July 1965
- Preceded by: Pavel Ștefan
- Succeeded by: Cornel Onescu

Minister of State Security
- In office September 20, 1952 – March 19, 1957
- Preceded by: None
- Succeeded by: None

President of the Grand National Assembly
- In office 28 December 1949 – 26 January 1950
- Preceded by: Dumitru Petrescu
- Succeeded by: Dumitru Petrescu

Personal details
- Born: September 27, 1913 Tisău, Buzău County, Kingdom of Romania
- Died: December 12, 1993 (aged 80) Budapest, Hungary
- Party: Romanian Communist Party
- Spouse: Márta Czikó

Military service
- Allegiance: Socialist Republic of Romania
- Branch/service: Securitate
- Years of service: 1950–1972
- Rank: Colonel general
- Battles/wars: Romanian anti-communist resistance movement

Alexandru Drăghici (Romanian pronunciation: [alekˈsandru drəˈɡit͡ʃʲ]; September 27, 1913 – December 12, 1993) was a Romanian communist activist and politician. He was Interior Minister in 1952 and from 1957 to 1965, and State Security Minister from 1952 to 1957. In these capacities, he exercised control over the Securitate secret police during a period of active repression against other Communist Party members, anti-communist resistance members and ordinary citizens.

An industrial worker by profession, Drăghici made his entry into the underground communist movement around the age of twenty. He was arrested for illegal political activity, and spent time in prison before and during World War II. He was close to Gheorghe Gheorghiu-Dej's communist faction, and, as such, rose quickly through the Communist Party ranks. He joined the repressive apparatus shortly before the Romanian communist regime was officially established.

Drăghici was infamous especially for the various campaigns he initiated against selected groups that resisted Marxist-Leninism. He began early on, with purges of the youth movements and teaching staff, joined in the denunciation of Ana Pauker's communist faction, and then focused his attention on the Hungarian-Romanian community. Drăghici is also remembered for his participation in the show trial of Lucrețiu Pătrășcanu, his quashing of the "Ioanid Gang", and his clampdown on religious groups—both Roman Catholic and Romanian Orthodox.

Both Gheorghiu-Dej and Drăghici opposed de-Stalinization, but their talk of national communism and socialist patriotism signaled Romania's emancipation from the Soviet Union. Drăghici still had important assignments after Gheorghiu-Dej's death, but was bitterly opposed to emerging communist leader Nicolae Ceaușescu. Ceaușescu used his influence in the party to incriminate Drăghici of all publicly known Securitate crimes, then deposed him. Drăghici was not brought to justice, but lived in anonymity in the Bucharest area from 1968 to 1989. After the overthrow of communism, he lived his final years in Hungary with his family, despite Romanian efforts to have him extradited. Shortly before his death, a trial held in absentia convicted him of incitement to murder.

== Biography ==
=== Origins and early activity ===
Drăghici was born into a peasant family in the Tisău Commune, Buzău County. He attended four grades of primary school and four years of vocational school, becoming a locksmith and mechanic for the Romanian Railways (CFR). In 1930 or 1934 he joined the banned Communist Party (PCR, later PMR). From 1931, he took part in rail workers' strikes, being one of the communist youth leaders at the Bucharest railway yards.

Being part of the PCR's proletarian wing, he quickly ran into trouble for illegal political activity. He was arrested in 1935 and tried in the 1936 Craiova Trial alongside future rival Ana Pauker, receiving a sentence of 9 years and 3 months imprisonment and being labeled a "notorious communist". He spent time at Doftana, Jilava, and Caransebeș prisons before being transferred in April 1944 to the prison camp at Târgu Jiu. While incarcerated, he joined the PCR nucleus formed around future leader Gheorghiu-Dej, while at the same time becoming a rival to Gheorghiu-Dej's successor, Nicolae Ceaușescu. For decades, Gheorghiu-Dej played one against the other, as a method of controlling each potential rival. Drăghici, who enjoyed prison seniority over Ceaușescu, was for a while Gheorghiu-Dej's cellmate, and allegedly acted as his personal servant.

Drăghici was freed right after the King Michael Coup in August 1944. By March 1945, he had been assigned to service the PCR's central committee (CC). He took up office as head of its Youth Bureau, working alongside G. Brătescu, the future historian of medicine, and C. Drăgan. As recalled by Brătescu, Drăghici had a conflict with party boss Vasile Luca, who objected to the idea of incorporating the Workers' Youth into the Bureau, and who singled out Drăghici for his incompetence in controlling "Progressive Youth" organizations during the 1930s. Also according to Brătescu, Drăghici played a role in increasing the PCR's control over student activists, and then in persecuting non-communist fraternal bodies such as YMCA Romania.

Benefiting from his CFR and Caransebeș pedigree at a time when Gheorghiu-Dej's faction turned into a nomenklatura, Drăghici became an alternate member of the CC in October 1945. He rose to full member in February 1948, after the establishment of a communist regime. From May 1945 to June 1946, he served as a public prosecutor at the Romanian People's Tribunals. This court was tasked with investigating war crime cases, specifically those related to the Holocaust in Romania. Researchers note that the Bucharest section, where Drăghici had been assigned, sentenced surprisingly few people (187, compared to the 668 sentenced in Cluj), and the punishments were generally lighter.

At the PMR's political and administrative section, Drăghici was adjunct (until August 1948) and director (1948–1949). Drăghici was elected to the Assembly of Deputies in the 1946 general election. He represented the Hunedoara and Bacău areas in the Assembly of Deputies as well as in the Great National Assembly until 1968. He was president of the latter body from December 1949 to January 1950, and sat on its presidium from 1965 to 1968.

In 1949–1950, Drăghici served as first secretary of the Bucharest party committee. Working closely with agitprop boss Leonte Răutu, he exercised direct influence over the communization of Bucharest schools. He was also assigned to represent the National Federation of Formerly Detained and Deported Antifascists, participating in the designation of communist memorials in such places as Doftana and Lupeni (in memory of both 1930s repression and the 1929 Strike). In 1950 he was promoted directly from common soldier to major general and named head of the Interior Ministry's political directorate. From 1951, he was also adjunct to the Interior Minister, and from 1950, he sat on the party's organizational bureau. The last three posts all expired in May 1952.

=== First ministerial posts ===
Drăghici's first stint as Interior Minister came from May to September 1952, when he replaced the disgraced Teohari Georgescu. He put an end to the "reeducation" experiment at the Pitești prison, where inmate Eugen Țurcanu had been allowed to torture his fellow prisoners into submission, but was also involved in setting up the show trial relating to the Danube – Black Sea Canal. The Interior Minister encouraged torture and inhumane treatment of political prisoners, as well as death sentences. An early case was that of Remus Koffler, the disgraced PCR financier. Under Gheorghiu-Dej's watch, Drăghici organized Koffler's interrogation, which involved daily beatings and humiliation.

Additionally, Drăghici took precautionary violent measures against the emerging anti-communist resistance movement, particularly so in Timișoara Region (western Romania). On August 14, he ordered the police structures there to begin "the liquidation and destruction of gangs, bandits and runaways". On October 1, he promoted Pavel Aranici as head of the Ministry's "Gangs" section, whose initial task was uprooting the Banat Mountains partisans. Also then, the Interior Minister tackled the activity of those Romanian Social Democrats who had refused to align themselves with the communists. According to one account, he approached their imprisoned leader, Ioan Flueraș, promising freedom for him and all his colleagues in exchange for a public penance. Flueraș was killed in prison just days after, allegedly because he refused that bargain. Drăghici's term saw the prosecution of Oana Orlea and other teenagers accused of counterrevolutionary activities. However, the Minister was also in contact with self-exiled musical celebrity George Enescu, Orlea's uncle, and may have hinted that Orlea could be released should Enescu return home.

Drăghici was promoted to lieutenant general in 1952 and colonel general in 1955. At the May 1952 party plenum, Drăghici was elected a supplementary member of the politburo (together with Ceaușescu and Dumitru Coliu), sitting as full member from 1955 to July 1965. From 1954, he was assigned to supervise the politburo's own involvement in police work, and drafted a list of "our most dangerous compatriots who have settled abroad", including those of the Romanian National Committee government-in-exile—one of them, Aurel Decei, was later kidnapped by Securitate operatives in West Berlin.

Drăghici served as State Security Minister from 1952 until March 1957. In this position, he collaborated closely with Gheorghiu-Dej and Iosif Chișinevschi to orchestrate the judicial murder of estranged PCR ideologist Lucrețiu Pătrășcanu, as well as spearheaded brutal campaigns of terror against the populace. Backed by Gheorghiu-Dej, Drăghici orchestrated a long series of trials and frame-ups. The party leader placed his trust in Drăghici, who was even given the task of spying on Gheorghiu-Dej's actress daughter, Lica Gheorghiu.

Under Drăghici's auspices, Gheorghiu-Dej used the Securitate to impose his own political line. His political liaison, General Evghenie Tănase, would later accuse the new ministry chief of working to replace the entire Securitate officers corps. The measure, inspired by Gheorghiu-Dej's latent nationalism, was intended to show the Soviet Union that "advisers" on security matters were no longer required. Sources of the day have it that Drăghici wanted "only those with special responsibilities" to be interviewed by the Soviet advisers, and only within the framework of "conventional provisions".

Together, Gheorghiu-Dej and his minister produced the so-called "Meges Case", a purge of the Romanian Roman Catholic community. Gheorghiu-Dej recommended his minister to come up with indictments of the Catholic leaders as agents of "foreign, hostile, circles"; Drăghici's order to his police forces, written in ungrammatical Romanian, was to try the Catholics behind closed doors, and then publicize the verdict. The repression resulted in the torture and death of missionary Vladimir Ghika. Also then, Drăghici was involved in the persecution of anti-communist Romanian Jews, especially Zionists. He approved the arrest of barrister Vișinescu, an ethnic Romanian, probably as retribution for his defense of a Jewish woman.

As two of Gheorghiu-Dej's supporters, Drăghici and his subordinate, Ion Vincze, were instrumental in the liquidation of Ana Pauker's inner party faction. Pauker and Luca stood accused of atrocities, but the claims were cherry-picked so that Drăghici's own contributions would not be brought to light. Following the purge, he took up a luxurious residence on Șoseaua Kiseleff, and the Paukers, who lived nearby, were forced to move out. Drăghici was himself involved in the surveillance of Pauker family members, including his former colleague Brătescu. Records of the PCR-PMR sessions show that he considered Brătescu a camouflaged fascist.

=== Drăghici vs. de-Stalinization ===
At the same time, in 1954, work on the Canal and other labor camps was halted, and beatings in prison outlawed. The Securitate was again on the alert just two years later, when de-Stalinization was officially introduced by the Soviet Union. When Romanian intellectuals first heard rumors about Nikita Khrushchev's Secret Speech, and began questioning Romania's own Stalinism, Drăghici extended secret police surveillance to the academic field.

The echoes of de-Stalinization were still faint in Romania, and Gheorghiu-Dej himself was never touched by it. In compensation, Ceaușescu spoke against Drăghici during a series of meetings in March 1956, accusing him of taking advantage of his relations with the leader to bring the party under Securitate control. Ceaușescu presented himself as a liberal in contrast with the brutality of the secret police under the command of Drăghici, who was labeled as "fanatical" and "merciless" by political scientist Vladimir Tismăneanu. Cautiously, Ceaușescu took distance from the more virulent of Drăghici's critics. So did party boss Emil Bodnăraș, who still made a point of criticizing Drăghici for not sharing his intelligence data with the CC plenum, suggesting to limit Drăghici's monopoly over the Romanian secret agencies.

Others were more rebellious. Veteran communist Gheorghe Vasilichi exposed himself by openly criticizing Gheorghiu-Dej, and also nominated Drăghici as a wrongdoer: "we still have the cult of personality, we still have haughtiness, even though Comrade Drăghici will tell you he is not haughty". Drăghici also withstood an attack from Miron Constantinescu, the Marxist-Leninist ideologue, who challenged the politburo about the decade of repression and murder. Drăghici, again supporting Gheorghiu-Dej, informed Constantinescu that he was only incriminating himself, an assessment equally supported by Ceaușescu.

While the party leadership, Gheorghiu-Dej included, reprimanded Constantinescu for being "un-party-like", Drăghici demanded a more serious verdict, that of "anti-party and fractionist" activity. Still, researchers note, the confrontation evidenced that the special relationship between the communist leader and his minister had passed the test of time.

Later that year, both Drăghici and Ceaușescu were part of a high command during the Hungarian Revolution of 1956, charged with suppressing unrest by any means necessary, including ordering security forces to open fire. Like other Securitate overseers, Drăghici was suspicious of Bolyai University cadres and Hungarian Romanian students. In his opinion, the university promoted deviation from the party line, and "the ideas of Imre Nagy"—on such grounds, the academic institution was infiltrated by the Securitate, and ultimately shut down. With his approval, the Securitate also began exercising tighter control over the Hungarian Autonomous Region. Nevertheless, when the revolution leaders were arrested and brought to Romania, Drăghici was the only involved party who objected to their being sent to Moscow, which earned him sympathy from the Hungarian government in the early 1990s.

=== Drăghici's political peak ===
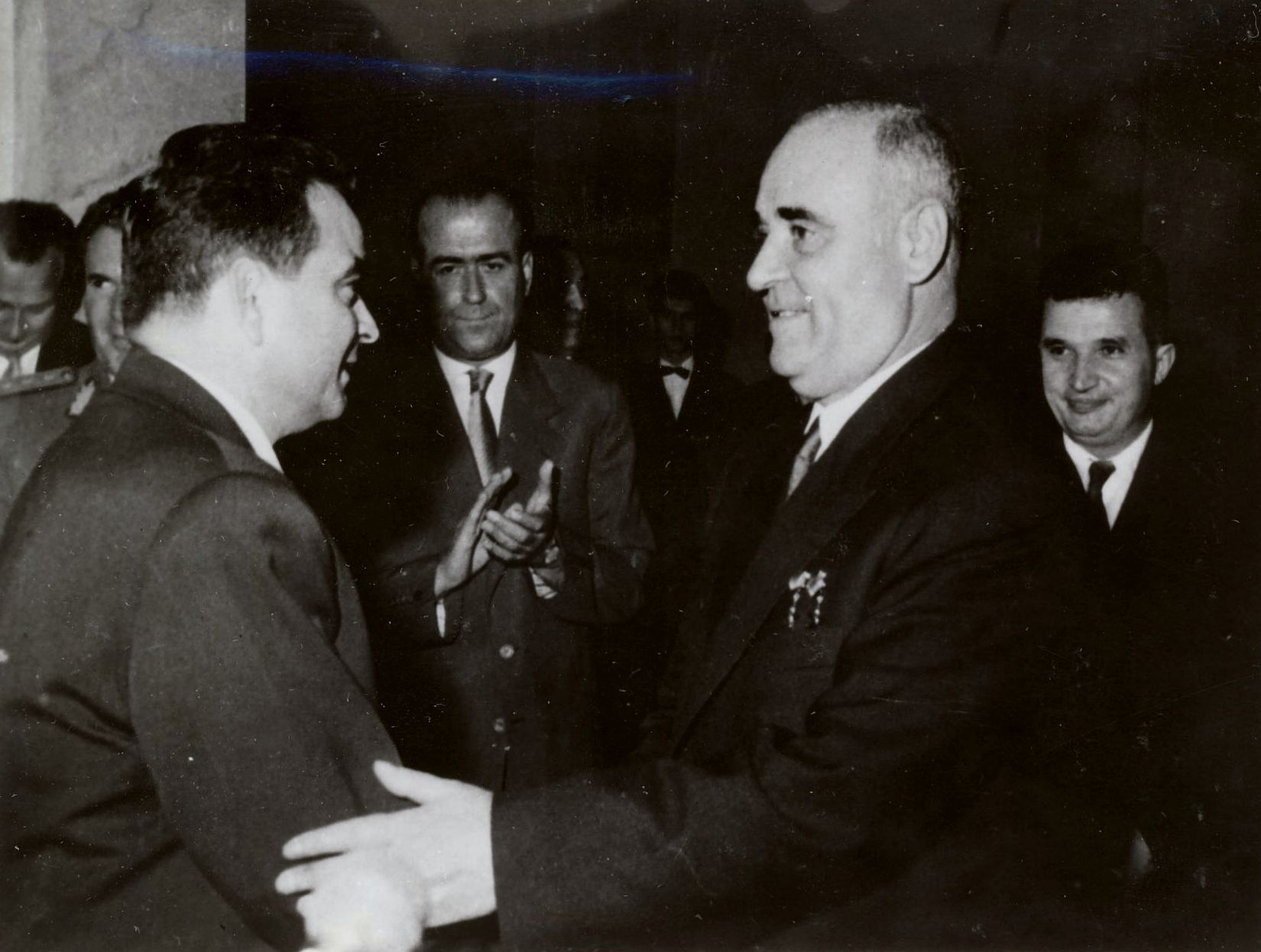
Gheorghiu-Dej's 60th birthday, November 1961. Drăghici (back row, middle) and Ceaușescu (back row, right) flanking the communist leader

In 1957, Drăghici again became Interior Minister, remaining until July 1965. His reappointment was a calculated move on Gheorghiu-Dej's part: the cabinet was Romanianized through reshuffling, and rebels such as Constantinescu were sidelined. The first priority on Drăghici's agenda was dealing with the "Hungarian nationalists" or "Magyar chauvinists". During May 1957, he told his subordinates that the Autonomous Region was riddled with saboteurs and collaborators of the anti-communist Ioan Faliboga, and implicitly accused local police of being too lenient. He also chided his subordinates for not purging "hostile elements" from among the Hungarian teaching staff, and called for a trial of community leaders Bishop Márton and Pál Fodor. In his words, these figures were guilty of "conspiracy with the evident purpose of destabilizing the democratic-popular regime." With Drăghici's consent, Bishop Márton was placed under house arrest, but the threat of popular revolt was high, and CC representative János Fazekas had to negotiate a deal with the protesters.

Drăghici began issuing new directives, which state his purpose of placing the Securitate under full party control (in effect, under Gheorghiu-Dej's command), and further away from Soviet influence. Part of Drăghici's activity was focused on overturning the contributions of his predecessor, Pavel Ștefan, who had allowed prosecution to open a case against the wardens at Salcia labor camp. These had been found guilty of murdering at least 63 prisoners in their care, and of torturing many others. Drăghici intervened with his superiors, claiming that the court's ruling was exaggerated. He obtained, in 1959, an early release for all of his former employees at Salcia. They were reemployed, with back-pay, and granted a month's vacation at the state's expense.

The late 1950s saw the virtual liquidation of the anti-communist partisans; part of Drăghici's responsibilities included commanding troops to combat that guerrilla force. In December 1957, he expressed dissatisfaction that the Securitate had not yet been able to capture one agent of American or British Intelligence, and not even one working for their "instruments" (KYP, MAH, Mossad). This may have prompted his staff to fabricate espionage cases against suspected dissidents.

The Securitate and other police forces were left to deal with independent anti-communist cells, whose sabotage actions embarrassed the Romanian communist government. Drăghici was involved in destroying the "Ioanid Gang", a small group of Jewish Romanian dissidents who had robbed the National Bank, and may even have forced them to act in the filmed reenactment. According to the prosecution in that case, when apprehended, the Ioanids were preparing the assassinations of Drăghici and Leonte Răutu, the latter of whom was tasked by the party with controlling the Jewish community from within. During August 1959, Drăghici, Nicolae Doicaru and Stasi agents managed to kidnap Oliviu Beldeanu, known for his 1955 attack on the Romanian embassy in Bern, Switzerland.

=== Against the religious revival ===
The Ministry's attention was focused especially on the Romanian Orthodox revival, that had seen growth after Romania's admittance to the United Nations. After 1958, Minister Drăghici was involved in the clampdown on hesychasm, officially depicted as a recruiting ground for the Iron Guard (a clandestine fascist movement). He reported to the political leadership that many "Iron Guard and reactionary elements" survived in monasteries, and that "monks are always swelling in numbers with the arrival of elements that have been indoctrinated with counterrevolutionary ideas". Scholar George Enache describes Drăghici's claims about fascist activities in the Church as farcical. He notes that the main target for repression, the "Burning Pyre" prayer group (headed by the incarcerated Sandu Tudor), had no links whatsoever with the Guard, and suggests that Drăghici was merely trying to discredit Patriarch Justinian. On Drăghici's recommendation, the state nationalized some monastery lands, shut down seminaries, and barred women under 50 from joining the nunneries. According to Church historiographer Iustin Marchiș, Drăghici's campaign resulted in the expulsion of at least 5,000 monks and nuns.

Drăghici is said to have personally ordered the brutal incarceration of Valeriu Anania, writer and monk, who was officially accused of organizing an underground unit for the Iron Guard. Under similar pretense, the Securitate arrested writer Vasile Voiculescu and other mystics involved with the "Burning Pyre". Reportedly, Drăghici also confronted born-again preacher Traian Dorz, of the Orthodox splinter group Oastea Domnului, asking him to cease all recruitment (Dorz refused, and was promptly arrested). The Minister was additionally involved, as a denouncer, in the downfall of Zaharia Stancu, disgraced president of the Writers' Union. While others opened files supposedly tracing Stancu's links with the Iron Guard and the mystics, Drăghici also accused the novelist of having spied on the communists imprisoned before 1944. At the height of the phenomenon, he decided against striking out terror tactics and, in 1963, ordered "reeducation" experiments in "misleading and demoralising political prisoners" to take place at Aiud prison.

Repression against the Orthodox revivalists was at the top of Drăghici's agenda even in later years. Citing one of his reports for 1962, Iustin Marchiș states: "Drăghici [argued that] the only internal enemy still confronting the people's democratic state was the Romanian Orthodox Church, led at the time by Patriarch Justinian Marina [...]. This fact, I believe, is a very important point to stress in debating with many of those who claim that the then-Patriarch or the Church leadership as a whole [...] did nothing [to resist the regime]."

=== 1964 nationalism ===
As the regime gained surer control over the country, Interior Ministry forces shifted from anti-resistance measures to less violent duties, and a substantial number of personnel were also freed up once political detainees were released in 1964. Drăghici disowned his favorite Securitate man, Aranici, allegedly because Aranici would wear an unbecoming yellow shirt at committee meetings; the former leader of the "Gangs" section was sent to do menial police work in the provinces.

Drăghici himself was given other political assignments. He was deputy prime minister from 1961 to 1965 and 1967 to 1968, and secretary of the CC from July 1965 to 1967. From 1965 to 1968, he was on the CC's executive committee and its permanent presidium. In tandem with suppressing most pockets of resistance, the regime experienced a growth in popularity: disagreements between Gheorghiu-Dej and Khrushchev saw Romania drifting away from the Soviet Union, and becoming more independent within the Eastern Bloc. The April 1964 Declaration of the Romanian party, which officially announced that Romania could no longer accept Sovietization, was first ran by the Securitate employees. During such informative sessions, Drăghici exceeded in tone the Declaration's framework, issuing strong accusations against the Soviets: he alleged that Khrushchev's media portrayed Romania as a "Gypsy" nation, that the Soviet envoys were being excessively suspicious of their hosts, that SovRom-type companies had become the butt of jokes in the communist east, and even that the Soviets intended to annex Romania.

Turning his attention to the condoned Russification of the 1950s, he exclaimed: "Comrades, there is not one invention, not one thing new in this world, without there also being a Russian coming right up, for them to be telling us that this Russian has in fact 'uncovered' that new fact, that new invention, beforehand!!" [sic]. Claiming to cite a SovRom engineer, Drăghici compared the Soviet treatment of Romanians with the apartheid regime. Although Romania still condemned "Titoism", the speaker paid tribute to neighboring Yugoslavia's Eastern Bloc dissidence.

The Romanian leadership registered with satisfaction the Declaration's genuine popularity, until Gheorghiu-Dej became aware that regular citizens were airing traditional Russophobia, defined as "bourgeois nationalism" in standard communist rhetoric. According to historian Walter M. Bacon, Jr., Gheorghiu-Dej's attempt "to supplant 'bourgeois nationalist' feelings with 'socialist patriotic' ones" relied on a political program devised by Drăghici, but was "largely unsuccessful."

Drăghici was also involved in the disinformation campaign launched by the Securitate. The latter planted Silviu Crăciunaș, with false anti-communist credentials, inside the Romanian National Committee of Washington, D. C. Drăghici himself released political captives such as Herant Torosian, indicating through Crăciunaș that Romania would allow them to leave for the West in exchange for foreign currency. This proposal had the added benefit of generating false trust in Crăciunaș amid the Romanian American exiles. According to Drăghici's own justification, selling off Romanian nationals to other countries was a banal occurrence, particularly so for Jews emigrating to Israel. He claimed to have collected 6,250,000 US dollars from this source alone, and to have thus enriched the national budget. As historian Marius Oprea notes, this initiative of his was the culmination of periodic antisemitic purges inside and outside the party structures.

=== Downfall ===
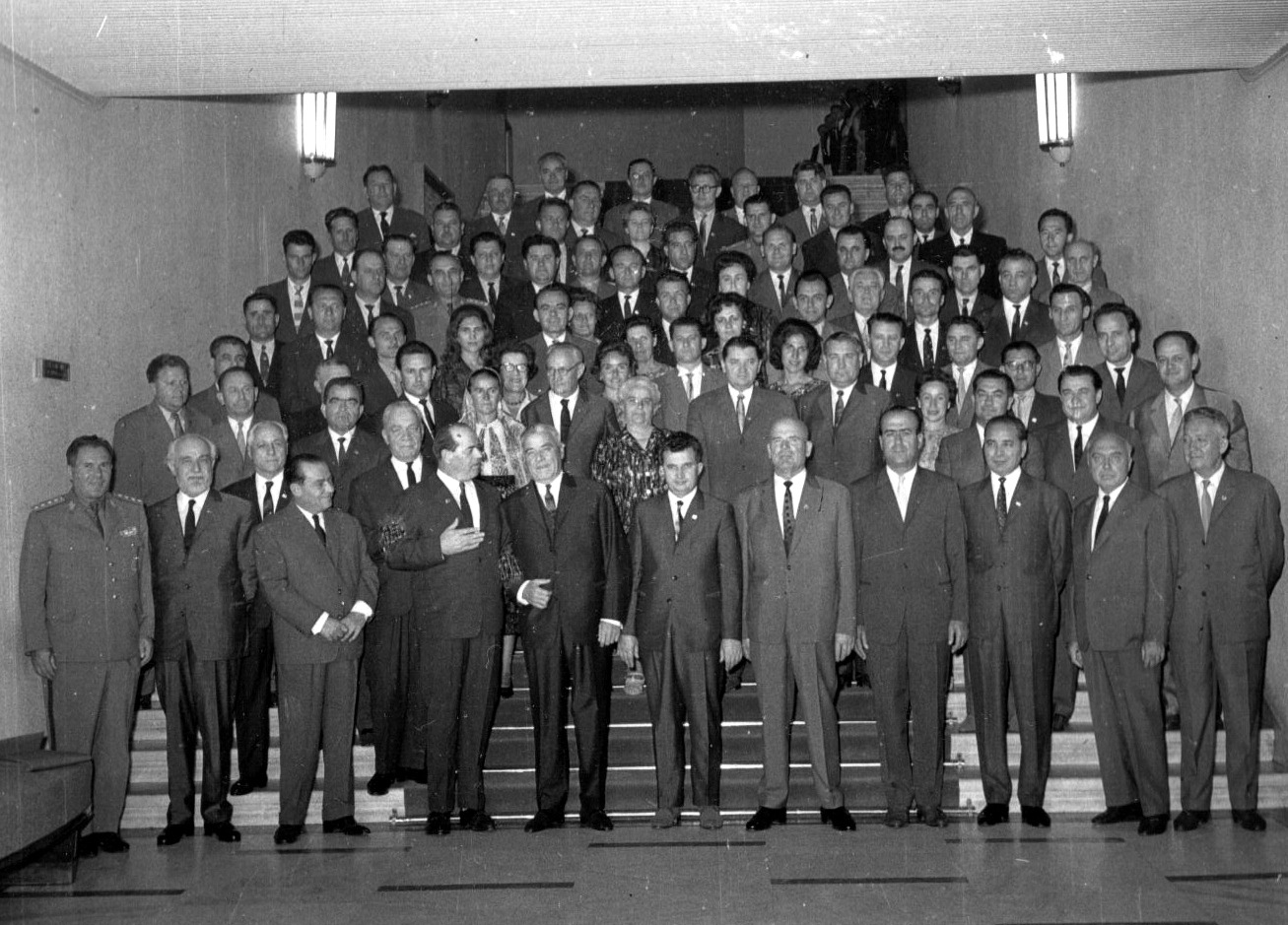
Ceaușescu and other Communist Party leaders on a visit to the recently renamed Hungarian "Mureș" Autonomous Region (1965). Drăghici is front row, fourth from right

When Gheorghiu-Dej died in March 1965, Ion Gheorghe Maurer, Chivu Stoica, and Emil Bodnăraș, fearful of seeing Drăghici come to power, all backed Ceaușescu as the new leader. Maurer also considered that Ceaușescu had stood up to Khrushchev, while Drăghici was seen as a loyal follower of the Soviet Union. Bacon writes: "So powerful was the apparatus of terror that its chief, Alexandru Dr[ă]ghici, challenged Ceau[ș]escu for political power following Gheorghiu-Dej's death. It is a tribute to Ceau[ș]escu's political agility and confidence that he was able to both purge Dr[ă]ghici and launch a brief period of liberalization during the second half of the 1960s."

As a preliminary step, Ceaușescu promoted Drăghici to second in command while placing a former subordinate in the Interior Ministry. This promotion actually marked the beginning of the end for Drăghici's career. By talking about liberalization, Ceaușescu made predictable the neutralization of the two most prominent exponents of political repression and cultural dogmatism of the Gheorghiu-Dej era: Drăghici and Răutu, respectively.

In late 1965 or early 1966, Ceaușescu asked Vasile Patilineț, an expert on political files, to compile documents related to Drăghici's involvement in the execution of Pătrășcanu as part of a wider investigation into Drăghici's handling of high-level positions. Ceaușescu desired Drăghici's elimination in an effort to "purify" the party, as the crimes committed under Drăghici were public knowledge; Ceaușescu also selected the former Securitate head as a scapegoat for all the repression that had occurred from 1952 to 1965, and claimed not to have been aware of the beatings carried out after the Hungarian revolution. Drăghici unwittingly aggravated Ceaușescu when, against the national communist plan of discarding the administrative regions, he supported a continued Hungarian autonomy. The two figures still agreed on other national policy aspects, including natalism: they both supported the 1966 ban on abortions.

Drăghici fell from power at the CC plenary of April 1968, when he came into conflict with Ceaușescu for supremacy within the party. The plenary saw Pătrășcanu rehabilitated and Drăghici excluded from the party altogether. Over the course of the year, he was removed from the CC's politburo and permanent presidium; from the deputy premiership; and from his officer's rank, being downgraded to a common soldier in the reserves. However, he suffered no further consequences, perhaps because he knew too much compromising information.

Sent in 1968 to head a state-run agricultural factory in Buftea, Drăghici retired in 1972. He was given a lavish pension as an older-generation party member and continued to reside in a luxurious Dorobanți villa. In the 1980s, he was sometimes seen standing in line to buy groceries, a rigid expression on his face, his eyes averted. Late in that decade, he was reportedly pleased by the increasing isolation and seeming self-destruction of Ceaușescu's regime.

=== Later years and efforts at prosecution ===
The communist regime fell in 1989 and in October 1991, after former political prisoners asked that the late 1960s case against Drăghici be reopened, he and his wife fled to Budapest to the flat of their daughter, who had moved there in 1988. In its bid to join the Council of Europe, the Romanian government cited the Drăghici case (and the indictments of his colleagues Gheorghe Homoștean, Tudor Postelnicu, etc.) as evidence that "those who tortured opponents of President Ceaușescu" were indeed facing trial.

In August 1992, the Romanian general prosecutor asked for Drăghici's extradition, but this was denied in December, as the statute of limitations had expired under Hungarian law. However, Hungary's Justice Ministry specified that this was not their final word, and requested more information. In December 1992, the Romanian side renewed its extradition request, arguing that the 1989 revolution had suspended the statute of limitations, a legally dubious move. The request was again denied.

In 1993 new charges were filed against Drăghici for the assassination he had ordered of one Ibrahim Sefit in Sibiu. Sefit was a mentally-ill and alcoholic ethnic Turk from Ada Kaleh who, in 1954, created a disturbance and began swearing at Drăghici in a cafeteria where the latter was eating. The latter ordered his liquidation; Sefit was arrested and the same night taken to a forest by a team of four Securitate officers, shot, and buried on the spot.

Found guilty of incitement to murder at a trial that began in May and sentenced in absentia, Drăghici died in Budapest that December. He had refused to grant any interviews and apparently expressed no remorse. He was cremated and his ashes smuggled into Romania by family members. The Catholic Bellu cemetery refused a plot for him, and he was finally buried in a cemetery following a religious service in 2003. By then, a controversy had erupted regarding the display of his portrait in an official gallery honoring the presidents of Romania's Lower Chamber (nominal successor to the Great National Assembly).

== Posterity ==
Drăghici was married to Márta Czikó, an ethnic Hungarian. Born in Bucharest, she was an activist in the party when it was banned; her two brothers, Nándor and Lőrinc, were militants of the left-wing Hungarian People's Union. The couple, who met in prison, had a son and a daughter. Drăghici was a committed atheist, and his wife, born into a Roman Catholic family, was not religious either; their children were not baptized.

Czikó, whose influence probably helped Pavel Aranici advance through the ranks, was deeply disliked by Elena Ceaușescu, whose own career during the underground period had been far less impressive. Through Márta's family, Drăghici was for a while related to Alexandru and Paul Ioanid, leaders of the "Ioanid Gang" and her husband's purported would-be assassins, who were two of the Securitate's most prominent victims. This connection embarrassed Drăghici, and was kept secret for a long time.

With Gheorghiu-Dej, Ceaușescu, and Pauker, Drăghici is a main character in the 1998 novel Prizonier în Europa ("A Prisoner in Europe"), by Alex Mihai Stoenescu. This novel shows the Securitate chief involved in a complicated relationship with the other leaders, and transmitting Gheorghiu-Dej's secrets to the Soviet leadership. A key moment in the narrative shows Nikita Khrushchev rewarding Drăghici's services with an impractical radio receiver while the other Romanian communists look on.
