= Justin Georgescu =

Justin Georgescu (June 11, 1922 – August 1942) was a Romanian communist activist and anti-fascist militant assassinated in police custody during World War II.

Born in Bucharest, Romania's capital, in 1922, Justin Georgescu became an orphan at an early age. After finishing primary school, in 1933 he entered in the Matei Basarab High School, where he was one of the top students. By autumn 1939, Georgescu took contact with communist ideals, becoming a member of the clandestine Union of Communist Youth (UTC). In the following months he took part in several action of the group, spreading manifestos and leaflets against Carol II's authoritarian regime and its alignment with Hitler's Germany. He also organized a protest of the students with communist sympathies against an initiative of his high school that would have eliminated poor students. Soon after, the UTC nominated him as leader of a "technical group", responsible for propaganda work in Bucharest's Green Sector.

In 1941, Georgescu enrolled in the Faculty of Letters of the University of Bucharest, and in spring 1942 he was elected a member in the leadership of the university's UTC cell. There he continued the anti-fascist propaganda by spreading manifestos condemning the pro-fascist dictatorship of Conducător Ion Antonescu and Romania's collaboration with Nazi Germany in the invasion of the Soviet Union, as well as presenting the achievements of the Soviet Army and of the other European resistance movements in the fight against the Axis powers. Manifestos also demanded that Romania sign a separate peace with the Allies.

On August 29, 1942 he was arrested while going to a secret meeting of the UTC. After being tortured in Bucharest's Police Headquarters, he was ultimately killed. In an attempt to cover the murder, and present it as a suicide, his body was thrown out of a window.

After the Romanian Communist Party came to power in Romania, Justin Georgescu, along other young Romanian anti-fascists fallen during World War II, was honoured as a "Hero of the youth".

== See also ==
- Francisc Panet
- Ştefan Plavăţ
- Filimon Sârbu
