= Stefu =

Surname list

Stefu is a Romanian surname. Notable people with the surname include:

- Pompiliu Ștefu (1910–1942), Romanian typographer and communist
- Vasile Stefu (born 2000), Moldovan footballer
