= Bern incident =

Bern incident or Berne incident might refer to:

- Operation Sunrise (World War II), a series of secret negotiations during World War II
- 1955 seizure of the Romanian embassy in Bern, known in Romania as the "Bern incident"
- 1982 seizure of the Polish embassy in Bern
