= Modrá Hvězda Dobřany =

Czech independent beer brewery

- Location: Dobřany, Czechia
- Coordinates: 49.6554275°N 13.2900819°E
- Opened: 1378
- Website: modra-hvezda.cz

Modrá Hvězda Dobřany is a small, independent Czech beer brewery based in the town of Dobřany.

Beer has been brewed in Dobřany since 1378. Modrá Hvězda opened in 1998, founded by Jaroslav Franěk, who had previously worked at Pilsner Urquell.
