= Lusztig =

Lusztig is a surname. Notable people with the surname include:

- George Lusztig (born 1946), Romanian-born American mathematician
- Irene Lusztig (born 1974), British-American nonfiction filmmaker
