= Pompiliu =

Pompiliu is a Romanian masculine given name that may refer to:

- Pompiliu Constantinescu
- Pompiliu Eliade
- Pompiliu Stoica
- Pompiliu Ștefu
