= Trivalea-Moșteni =

- Commune
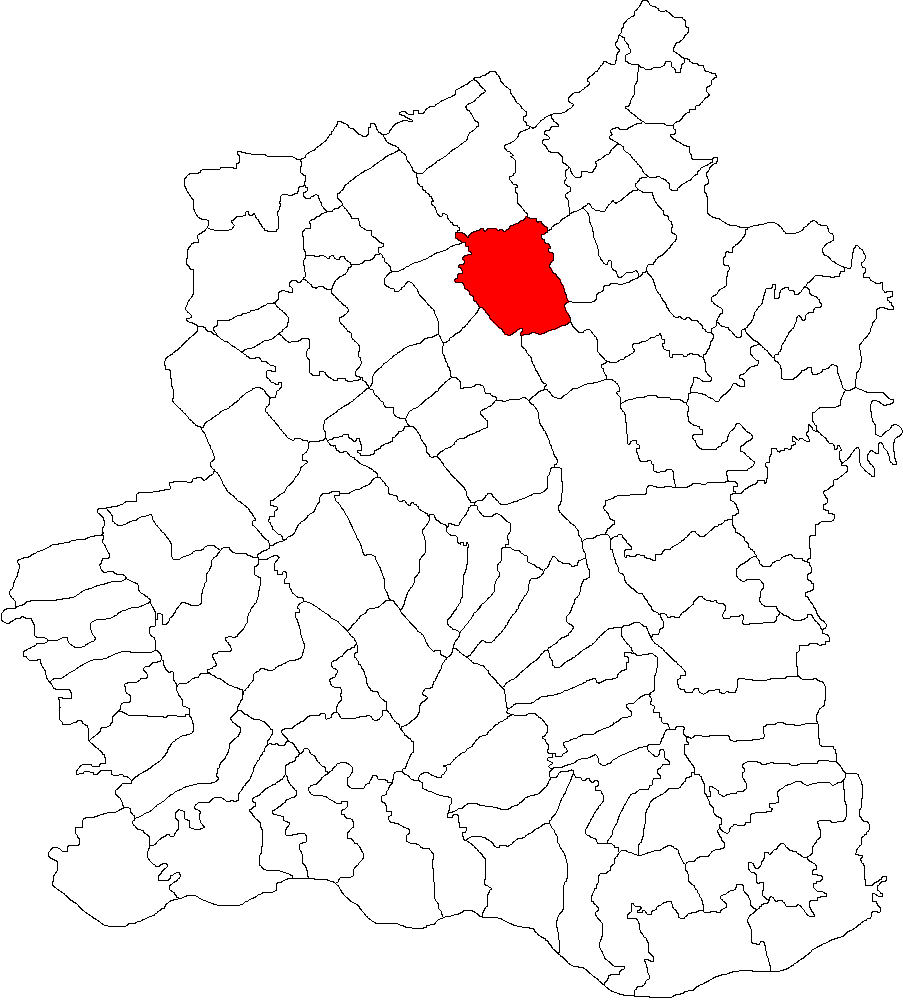
- Location in Teleorman County

- Location in Romania
- Coordinates: 44°16′N 25°14′E
- Country: Romania
- County: Teleorman
- Subdivisions: Brătășani, Deparați, Trivalea-Moșteni

Government
  - Mayor (2020–2024): Nicolae Marius Bocancilă (PSD)
- Area: 91.11 km^{2} (35.18 sq mi)
- Elevation: 95 m (312 ft)
- Population (2021-12-01): 2,282
  - Density: 25/km^{2} (65/sq mi)
- Time zone: EET/EEST (UTC+2/+3)
- Postal code: 147410
- Area code: +(40) 247
- Vehicle reg.: TR
- Website: www.trivaleamosteni.ro

Trivalea-Moșteni is a commune in Teleorman County, Muntenia, Romania. It is composed of three villages: Brătășani, Deparați (Schela until 2001), and Trivalea-Moșteni.

== Natives ==
- Ion Pistol (1946–1987), convicted murderer
