= Ion Pistol =

Last person sentenced to death in Romania apart from Nicolae and Elena Ceaușescu

Ion Pistol (1 December 1946 – 12 May 1987) was a Romanian convicted murderer, the last person put to death in what was then the Socialist Republic of Romania prior to the execution of Nicolae and Elena Ceaușescu. He was tried for murder on 9 April 1986, before a 500-person auditorium. His lawyer, Liviu Ardeiaș, claimed that sentencing him to death would result "not in execution, but in murder". The same day, the Teleorman County tribunal handed down a death sentence. On 4 May 1987, Ceaușescu rejected his plea for clemency. Eight days later, he was executed by shooting at a prison in the Bucharest area.

According to Pistol's criminal record, he was born in the commune of Trivalea-Moșteni, where he was living at the time of his arrest, and had a fourth-grade education. The report indicates he killed his mother Gheorghița with multiple axe blows on the night of 30–31 October 1985 and was arrested on 1 November 1985. He was taken to Jilava Prison prior to his execution and asked for an onion omelette for his last meal.

== See also ==
- Trial and execution of Nicolae and Elena Ceaușescu
- List of people executed in Romania
