= Joseph Maria Wolfram =

Politician and Amateur Composer

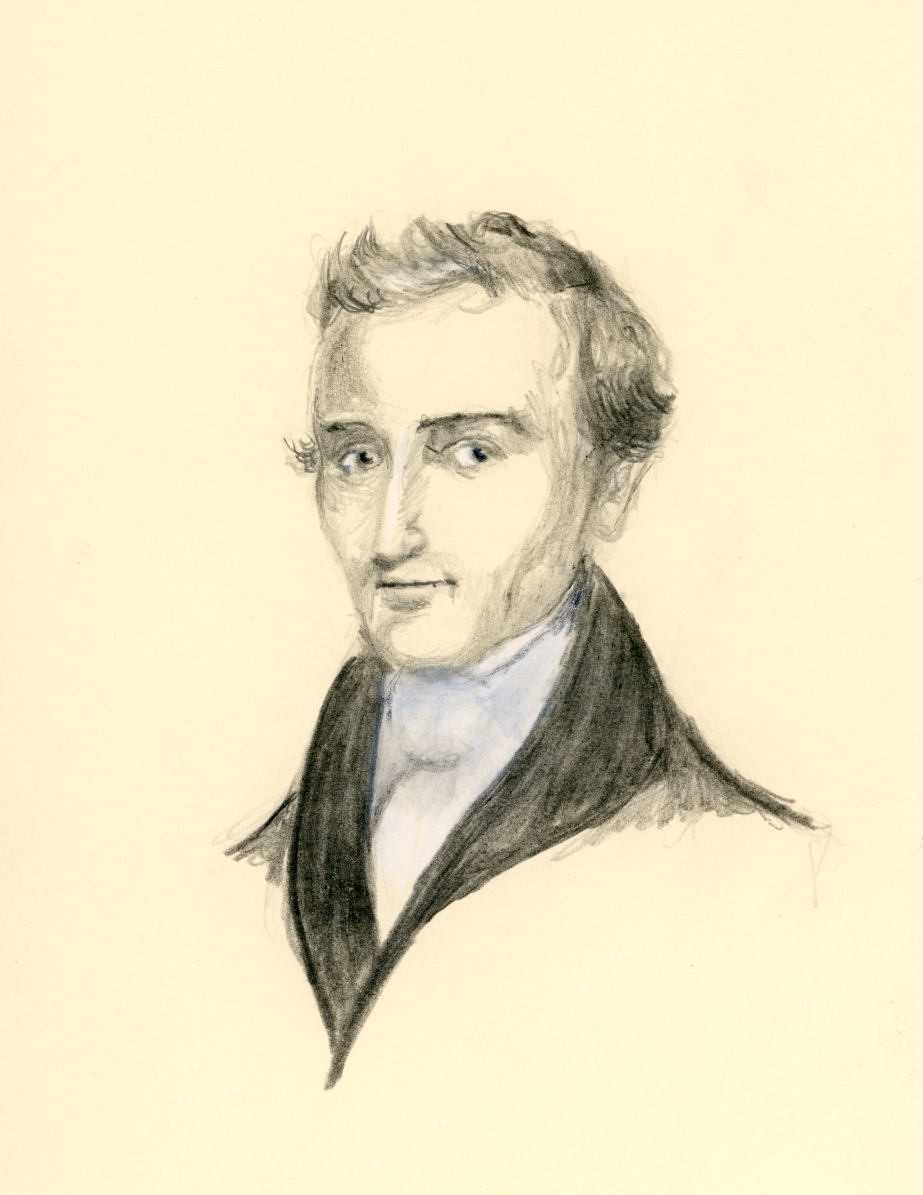
- Born: 21 July 1789; Dobřany, Bohemia
- Died: 30 September 1839 (aged 50); Teplice, Bohemia
- Occupations: Politician and composer

Joseph Maria Wolfram (21 July 1789 – 30 September 1839) was a German-Czech politician and amateur composer who wrote operas which were performed with success.

== Biography ==
Wolfram was born on 21 July 1789 in Dobřany in Bohemia. He first studied philosophy at the Karls-Universität in Prague, but also harmony with Leopold Koželuch. He went to Vienna to study piano under Joseph Drechsler and taught music there from 1811. Quitting music as a profession in 1813, he became a government official at Theusing, and eventually worked his way up to the mayor of Teplice in 1824. He wrote several operas which became popular. Such was the popularity of his opera Alfred that when a replacement for Carl Maria von Weber in the position of kapellmeister was needed, Wolfram was among those contemplated. He died in Teplice.

== Works ==
Wolfram's best-known works are his operas. Der Diamant was first produced in Teplice around 1820. Two of his operas, Herkules and Maja und Alpino, oder die bezauberte Rose, were both produced in Dresden in 1826, while the latter was also produced in Prague that year. This same year saw the first production of Alfred. In 1828, again in Dresden, his opera Die Normannen in Sicilien was performed. The next year saw the production of Prinz Lieschen. Der Bergmönch followed in 1830, first produced in Dresden on March 14. Das Schloss Candra was first performed in 1832, also in Dresden. The final opera, Wittekind, was produced in 1838. In addition to his operas, he wrote a wedding mass, a Requiem, and a collection of Serbian songs. He also composed instrumental music, including string quartets and piano sonatas. A concerted effort to collect and catalog the operas of Wolfram was headed by Tomáš Spurný.
