= Vasile Stefu =

Moldovan footballer

Personal information
- Full name: Vasile Stefu
- Date of birth: 26 July 2000 (age 26)
- Place of birth: Moldova
- Position: Forward

Team information
- Current team: Olimp Comrat

Youth career
- –2017: Academia Chișinău

Senior career*
Years	Team	Apps	(Gls)
2016	Cahul-2005		
2017	Academia Chișinău	10	(0)
2017	Spicul Chișcăreni	6	(0)
2020	Florești	19	(1)
2021	Zimbru Chișinău	12	(2)
2021–	Olimp Comrat		

International career^{‡}
2016	Moldova U17	3	(0)
2020–	Moldova U21	3	(0)
- * Club domestic league appearances and goals as of 10:59, 22 March 2022 (UTC) ‡ National team caps and goals as of 10:59, 22 March 2022 (UTC)

Vasile Stefu (born 26 July 2000) is a Moldovan footballer who plays as a forward for Olimp Comrat.

== Career ==
On 22 February 2021, Stefu signed for Zimbru Chișinău. He left the club after the end of the 2020–21 season, when he joined Olimp Comrat.
