= Ștefan Plavăț =

Romanian resistance member (1913–1944)

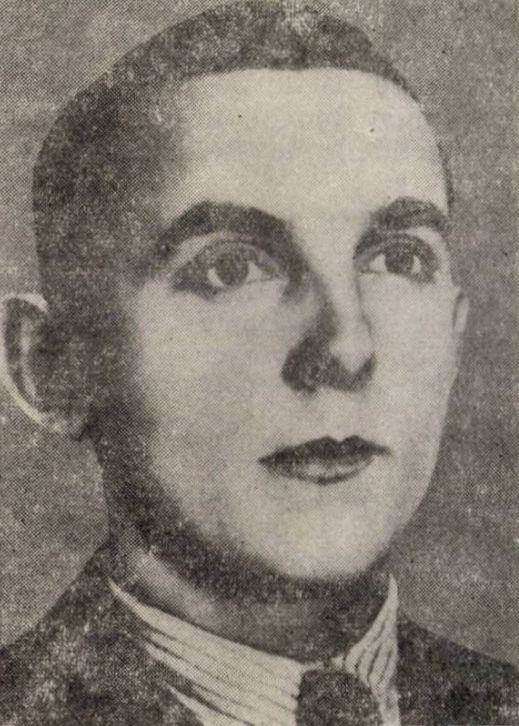
The portrait of Ștefan Plavăț (1913–1944)

Ștefan Plavăț (April 24, 1913 – June 18, 1944) was a Romanian communist activist, leader of a resistance group active in South-Western Romania during World War II.

Plavăț was born in Eșelnița, in South-Eastern Banat, to a family of poor peasants. Due to material difficulties, in 1927 he was forced to leave high school, and in autumn he enrolled in the Apprentices' School of the Romanian Railways (CFR) in Timișoara. Here he came into contact with communist ideas and became an active member of the local worker movement. After finishing school, he was hired as a carpenter in the Timișoara CFR Workshops, and soon afterwards was elected a member in the committee of the local trade union. His political activism was seen as dangerous by the Workshops' management, and led to his reassignment to a marginal branch of the enterprise.

Plavăț returned to Timișoara in the first years of World War II, rejoining the Workshops, and becoming a leading member of the local clandestine organisation of the Romanian Communist Party (PCR). As Romania's dictator Ion Antonescu had joined Nazi Germany's Operation Barbarossa against the Soviet Union, Plavăț and others participated in the sabotage of the war production of the Axis. Arrested along other workers of the Workshops in autumn 1942, he was ultimately released due to lack of evidence.

In May 1944, as the tide of war had turned against the Axis, the Communist Party's Banat chapter, led by Leontin Sălăjan, decided to organise a group of partisans in the mountainous area of the region. Plavăț was given the political command of the Mărășești detachment, active in the Caraș Mountains, in the area of his native village. The headquarters was established on the Semenic Mountain, and the main actions of the partisan detachment involved sabotaging of the rail line linking Timișoara with Reșița, an important industrial centre controlled by the Germans, and Bucharest, Romania's capital. On the morning of June 13, 1944, due to a betrayal of a captured partisan, Siguranța, the Romanian secret police, and the Gendarmerie surrounded the detachment. As the partisans refused to surrender, a gunfight ensued between them and the government troops. Although most of the partisans succeeded in escaping in the thick forest, Plavăț was mortally wounded.

After the dictatorship of Ion Antonescu was overthrown in the August 1944 coup d'état, and especially after the Communist Party gained power in Romania, Plavăț was one of the several anti-fascist fighters acclaimed as heroes by the official propaganda. Several streets, parks, and schools were thus named after him in the area of Banat.

== See also ==
- Francisc Panet
- Filimon Sârbu
