= Irene Lusztig =

British-American filmmaker (born 1974)

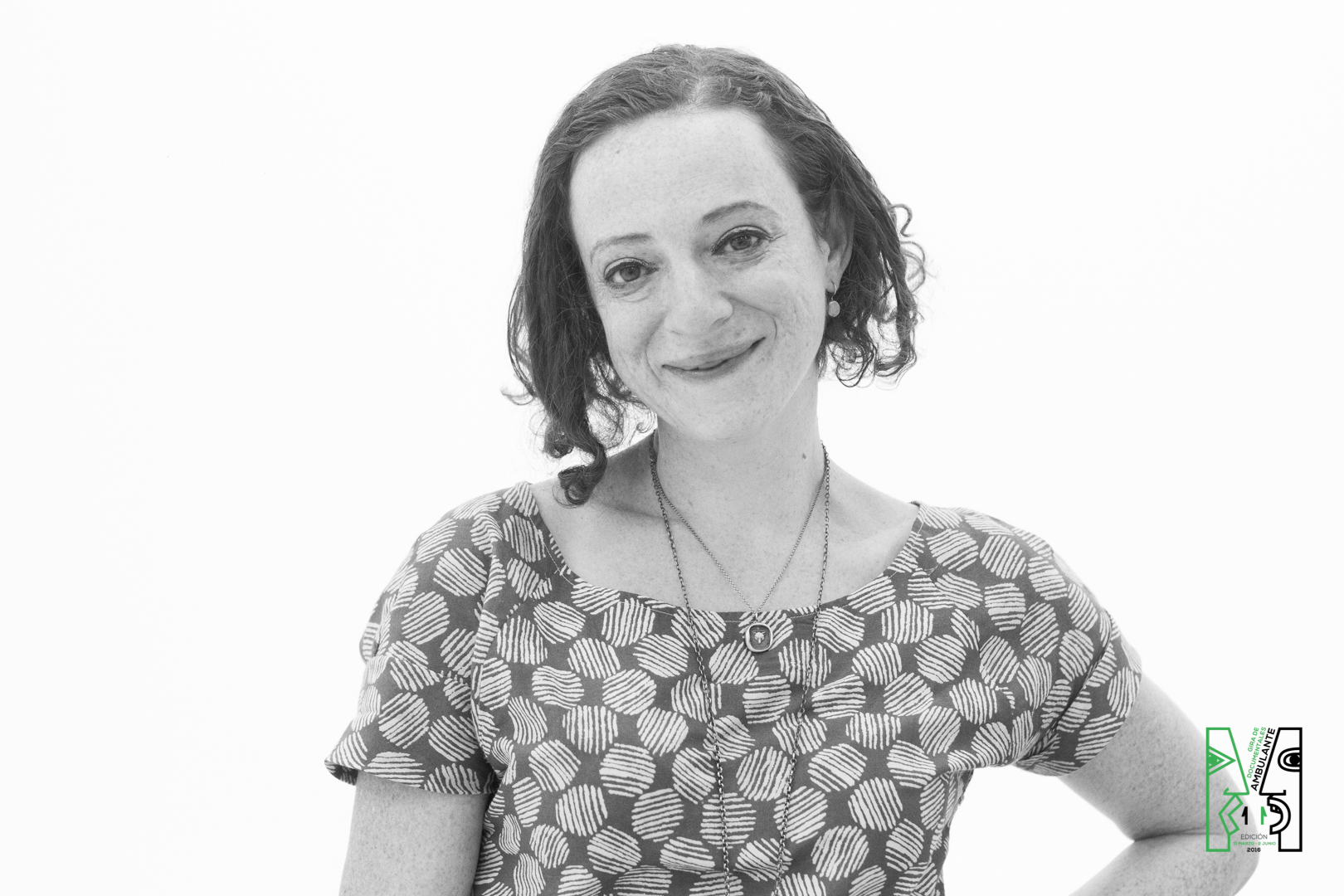
- Born: 1974 (age 51–52)
- Occupations: Non-fiction filmmaker; artist

Academic background
- Education: Bard College; Harvard College

Irene Lusztig (born 1974) is a nonfiction filmmaker and artist. Her work explores historical memory, archival materials, communism and post-communism, as well as feminist historiography.

Irene is a first generation Romanian-American who was born in England, raised in Boston and now lives in Santa Cruz, California. She completed her BA in filmmaking and Chinese Studies from Harvard university. Lusztig went on to complete her MFA in film and video at the Milton Avery Graduate School of the Arts at Bard College.

Her long career has taken her around the world with her work being screened at prominent film festivals like Berlinale, MoMA, Film Society of Lincoln Center, Museum of Fine Arts Boston, Anthology Film Archives, Pacific Film Archive, Flaherty NYC, IDFA Amsterdam, Hot Docs, AFI Docs, BFI London Film Festival, Melbourne Film Festival, DocLisboa and RIDM Montréal. Currently, she is a Professor of Film and Digital Media at UC Santa Cruz.

== Career ==
Lusztig's debut feature film Reconstruction, released in 2001, tells the story of her Romanian-Jewish maternal grandmother Monica Sevianu, who was sentenced to life in prison for taking part in the Ioanid Gang bank heist in 1959. The film explores issues of Romanian Communist history, re-enactment and authoritarian politics through the personal lens of Lusztig's family history. The film had its international premiere in the First Appearances program at IDFA in Amsterdam, was shown in MoMA's Doc Fortnight screening program, and was broadcast on ARTE. It was praised as "a film of ambition and scope" by the Boston Phoenix and hailed as "an example of personal documentary at its best" by Variety. In 2003, Filmmaker Magazine named Lusztig one of their 25 new faces of indie film.

Her 2013 feature-length film The Motherhood Archives combines over 100 educational archival films to explore the ideologically mediated histories of childbirth in the 20th century.

Her most recent feature-length film, Yours in Sisterhood (2018), explores the unpublished letters sent to Ms. Magazine in the 1970s. This film examines history and second-wave feminism in the context of the most recent wave of feminist politics. It premiered at the 2018 Berlinale Forum and was nominated for a Teddy Award for Best Documentary/Essay Film. Filmed between 2015 and 2017, Yours in Sisterhood uses "embodied listening" techniques to invite contemporary women across the United States to read and reflect on letters to the editor of Ms. written between 1972 and 1980. The film was critically praised by The Huffington Post, The Washington Post, the Los Angeles Review of Books, and Hyperallergic.

Lusztig's work usually brings historical materials into conversation with the present day, inviting viewers to explore historical spaces as a way to contemplate larger questions of politics, ideology, and the production of personal, collective, and national memories.

Lusztig's films have screened around the world, including in the Film Society of Lincoln Center, Anthology Film Archives, the Pacific Film Archive, BFI London Film Festival, Hot Docs, AFI Docs, Melbourne International Film Festival, and RIDM Montréal.

Apart from being a director, Lusztig has also acted as a producer in films like Contents Inventory(2021), Out of Sight(2015), Maternity Test(2014), Exit 426: Watsonville(2012), The Samantha Smith Project(2005) and Reconstruction(2002).

She was a 2010-11 Radcliffe Institute for Advanced Study David and Roberta Logie Fellow and Radcliffe-Harvard Film Study Center Fellow.

She is a 2021 Guggenheim Fellow.

== Filmography ==
Year	Film title	Duration	Format	Notes
2023	Richland	93 min.		
2018	Yours in Sisterhood	101 min.	HD video	Distributed by Women Make Movies
2016	Forty Years	12 min.	HD video	
2014	Maternity Test	14 min.	HD video	
2013	The Motherhood Archives	90 min.	16mm, HD video, archival materials	Distributed by Women Make Movies
2005	The Samantha Smith Project	51 min.	DV, Super 8, archival materials	
2001	Reconstruction	90 min.	DV, super 8, archival materials	Distributed by Women Make Movies
1997	For Beijing with Love and Squalor	58 min.	Hi8 video	
