= Dobřany =

- Town
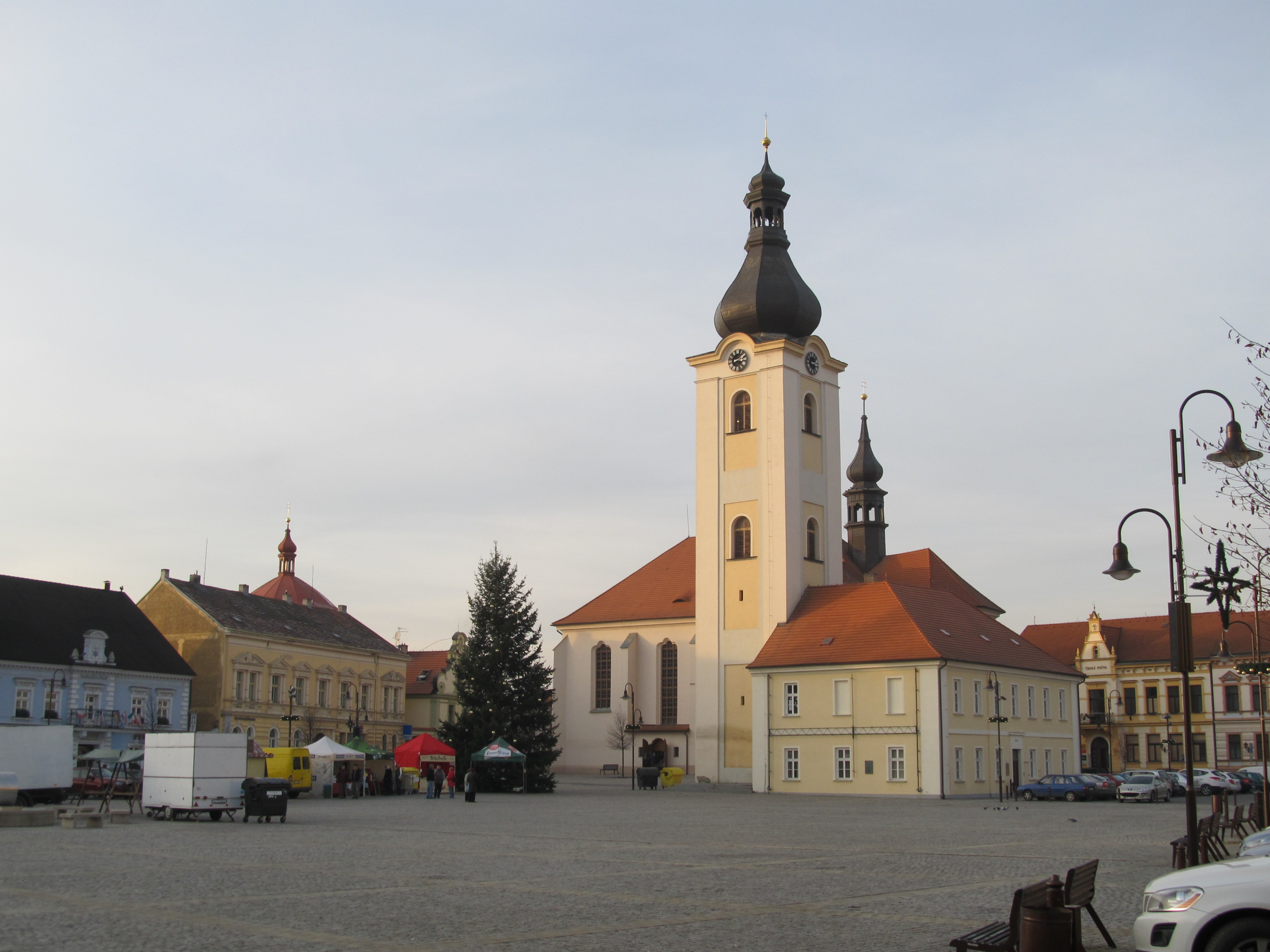
- Town square with the Church of Saint Nicholas

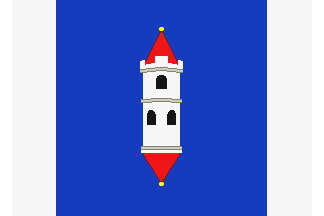
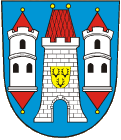
- Flag Coat of arms

- Location in the Czech Republic
- Coordinates: 49°39′14″N 13°17′25″E
- Country: Czech Republic
- Region: Plzeň
- District: Plzeň-South
- First mentioned: 1243

Government
  - Mayor: Martin Sobotka

Area
  - Total: 35.32 km^{2} (13.64 sq mi)
- Elevation: 352 m (1,155 ft)

Population (2026-01-01)
  - Total: 6,483
  - Density: 183.6/km^{2} (475.4/sq mi)
- Time zone: UTC+1 (CET)
  - Summer (DST): UTC+2 (CEST)
- Postal code: 334 41
- Website: www.dobrany.cz

Dobřany (Czech pronunciation: [ˈdobr̝anɪ]; German: Dobrzan) is a town in Plzeň-South District in the Plzeň Region of the Czech Republic. It has about 6,500 inhabitants. The town is located on the Radbuza River, on the border between the Plasy Uplands and Švihov Highlands. It is known for a large psychiatric hospital.

The historic town centre is well preserved and is protected as an urban monument zone. The main landmark of Dobřany is the Church of Saint Nicholas.

== Administrative division ==
Dobřany consists of three municipal parts (in brackets population according to the 2021 census):

- Dobřany (6,435)
- Šlovice (419)
- Vodní Újezd (117)

== Etymology ==
The term dobřani (derived from the Czech word dobrý, i.e. 'good') referred to people who live near good (clear) water or good (fertile) soil.

== Geography ==
Dobřany is located about 10 kilometres (6 mi) south of Plzeň. It lies on the border between the Plasy Uplands and Švihov Highlands. The highest point is a nameless hill at 516 m (1,693 ft) above sea level. The Radbuza River flows through the municipality.

== History ==
The first written mention of Dobřany is from 1243. Around the mid-13th century, the settlement was referred to as a town. Around 1265, after the death of the then-owner of the town Jan of Dobřany, the town was acquired by the Chotěšov Abbey. The monastery granted the town new rights. Dobřany benefited from a favorable location and was a market centre for a wide area, although its importance decreased with the founding of the new city of Plzeň in 1295.

During the Hussite Wars, Dobřany was conquered by the army of Jan Žižka. After 1437, the monastery regained the town. In 1585, the town received a customs duty, the proceeds of which were to be used for the repair of the bridge and roads. Due to the ecclesiastical authority, Dobřany remained Catholic even during the growing Reformation.

The town's prosperity ended only with the Thirty Years' War. Dobřany ceased to be property of the monastery in 1618 and was acquired by Jáchym Lubský. The town was burned down by various armies in 1620 and 1632, then it was looted by the army of Lennart Torstensson in 1645. Dobřany became depopulated, but was gradually resettled by families from Saxony and Bavaria and became German-speaking. By the mid-18th century, the town had grown and was larger than before the Thirty Years' War.

From 1938 to 1945, Dobřany was annexed by Nazi Germany and administered as part of the Reichsgau Sudetenland.

== Demographics ==
Historical population

Year	Pop.	±%
1869	2,450	—
1880	3,506	+43.1%
1890	5,485	+56.4%
1900	5,774	+5.3%
1910	6,588	+14.1%

Year	Pop.	±%
1921	5,793	−12.1%
1930	7,139	+23.2%
1950	4,859	−31.9%
1961	4,439	−8.6%
1970	4,969	+11.9%

Year	Pop.	±%
1980	5,171	+4.1%
1991	5,624	+8.8%
2001	5,666	+0.7%
2011	6,769	+19.5%
2021	6,971	+3.0%

Source: Censuses

== Economy ==
Dobřany is known for its psychiatric hospital. With more than 1,000 employees, it is the main employer in the town.

== Transport ==
The D5 motorway from Plzeň to the Czech–German border runs through the northern part of the municipal territory.

Dobřany is located on the railway line Prague–Klatovy via Plzeň.

== Sights ==
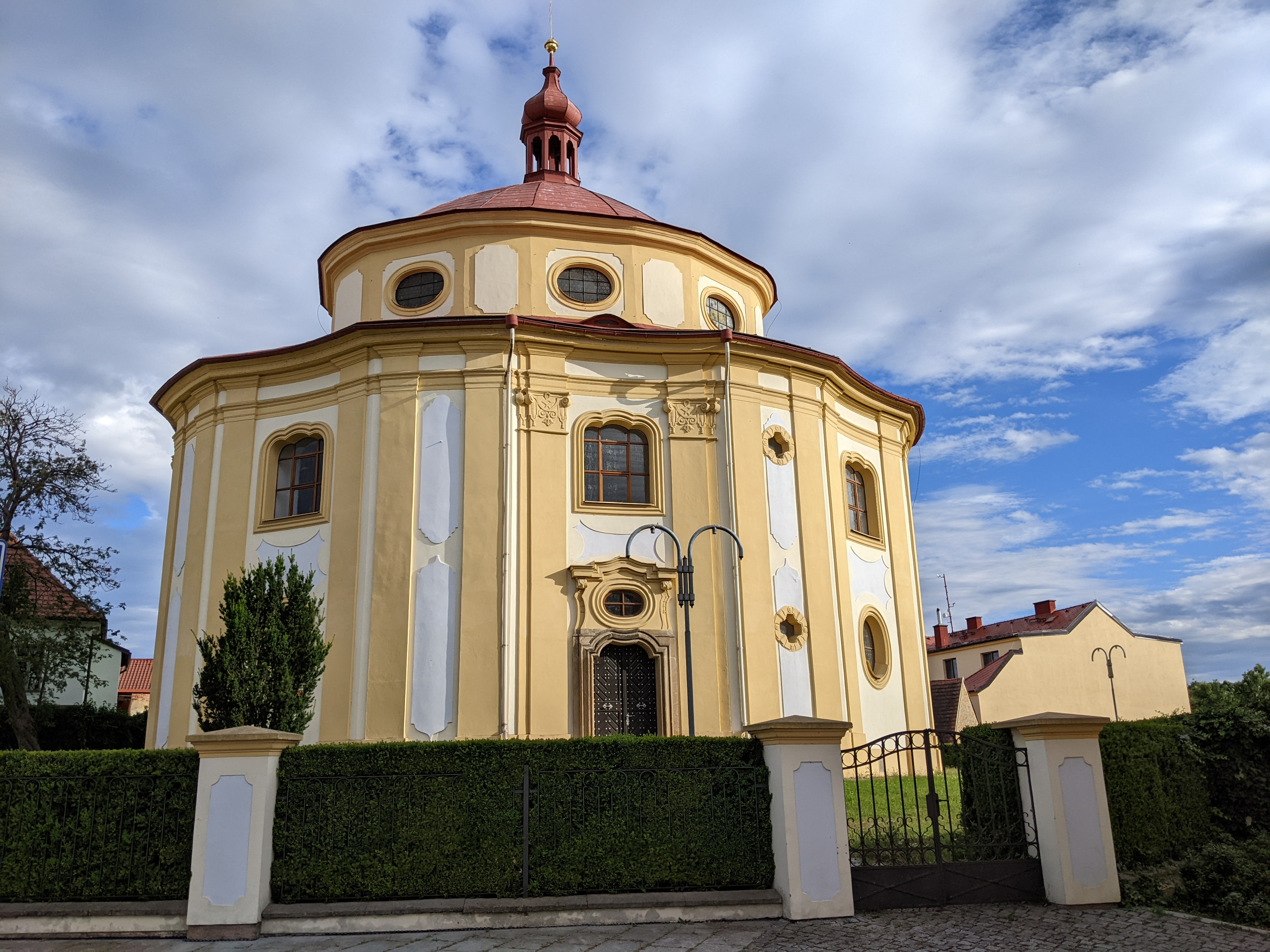
Church of Saint Vitus

The main landmark of the town square is the Church of Saint Nicholas. This Gothic church was first documented in 1259. After it was damaged several times, it was rebuilt in the Baroque style in 1756–1758. The free-standing Baroque bell tower was built in 1694–1700.

The Church of Saint Vitus was first mentioned in 1260 and stands right across from the Church of Saint Nicholas. The current building was built on the site of the old church in 1727–1734. It was built in the Baroque style according to the project of Jakub Auguston. The premises of the church are used as the town's art gallery.

The Baroque stone bridge over the Radbuza has a Gothic core and was first documented in the second half of the 16th century. Its present form dates from 1879, when the heavily damaged bridge was reconstructed. It is a valuable technical monument.

== Notable people ==
- Jan Josef Ignác Brentner (1689–1742), composer
- Joseph Maria Wolfram (1789–1839), German-Bohemian politician
- Norbert Ormay (1813–1849), colonel in the Hungarian Army

== Twin towns – sister cities ==
Dobřany is twinned with:

- Brežice, Slovenia
- Dobřany, Czech Republic
- Obertraubling, Germany
