= 1982 seizure of the Polish embassy in Bern =

Incident in Switzerland in 1982

Coordinates: 46.93815°N 7.46246°E

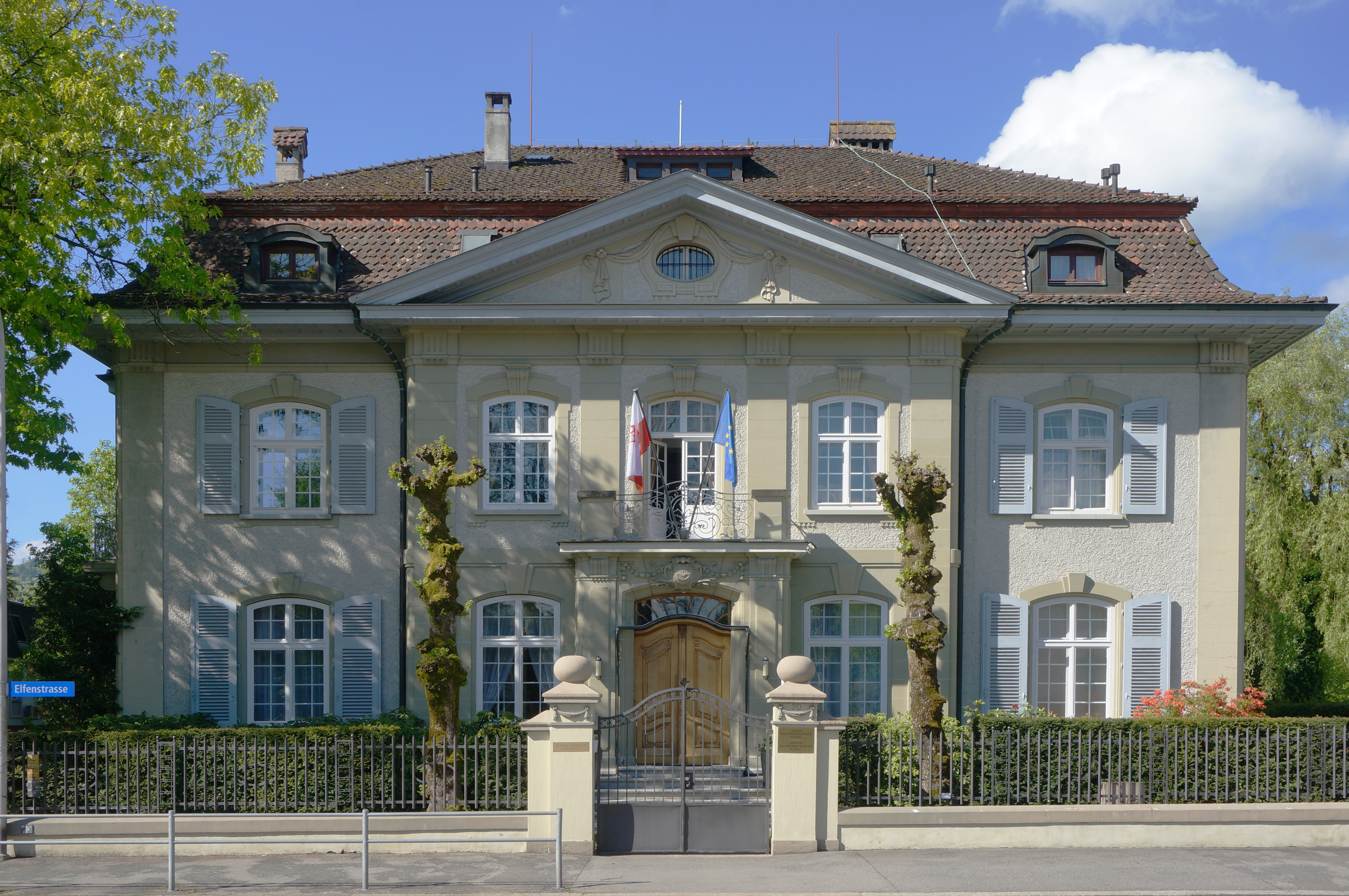
Bern, Elfenstrasse 20. - Residence of Polish Embassy in Switzerland

The 1982 seizure of the Polish embassy in Bern, Switzerland was a politically and financially motivated hostage situation. The embassy was seized by a group of four Polish exiles, led by a former employee of the Służba Bezpieczeństwa (SB) security service, Florian Kruszyk. After seizing the embassy and taking 14 hostages, the group made several broad political demands including the abolition of martial law in Poland. They also requested several million Swiss francs, threatening to destroy the embassy with explosives if their demands were not met. The group's financial demands, and Kruszyk's previous conviction for an armed robbery involving hostage-taking, led some experts to cast doubt on the group's motives being primarily political.

After intensive negotiations, a Swiss elite Stern anti-terror squad raided the embassy, freeing the hostages without a shot being fired. The raid took place around 36 hours after the siege had begun.

== Events ==
On September 6, 1982, a group of four Polish exiles, armed with four Remington 870 shotguns, multiple knives and gas masks, stormed the Polish embassy in Bern in Switzerland and took 14 embassy workers hostage. The group was headed by Florian Kruszyk, a former employee of the Służba Bezpieczeństwa (SB) security service. The group tossed a message out of the embassy window which demanded the abolition of martial law in Poland, the release of all political prisoners, the dismantling of what they described as prison camps, and the end of "all repression of the Polish people". They threatened to hand over confidential documents to Swiss authorities that allegedly detailed secret senders and receivers, photos of military facilities in Switzerland, plans, lists of secret agents in Germany and France, and lists of hidden money. The group also threatened to blow up the embassy building should their demands not be met within 48 hours. The four gunmen self-identified as members of the "Insurgent Home Army" (Powstańcza Armia Krajowa), which is a group designated as a terrorist organization by Poland that was believed to also be responsible for a deadly attack on Zdzisław Karos, a member of the Citizens' Militia, on February 18, 1982.

Negotiations, headed by the then Bundesrat Kurt Furgler and also aided by Dominican Józef Maria Bocheński, took place over the course of 35 recorded phone calls. Attempts to convince the gunmen to surrender proved unsuccessful. Around 36 hours after the start of the hostage situation, one of the gunmen found a military attaché in the embassy. The attaché had previously hidden in a secret room of the embassy. The gunmen threatened to release the intelligence found in this secret room to any nation that was interested. In the meantime, the task force had already started to make plans for processing all the highly important documents.

At first, the Polish authorities intended to storm the embassy with one of their own special forces units, but this offer was blocked by Swiss authorities. However, as the situation deteriorated for the gunmen, they lowered their ransom demands to three million Swiss francs and the possibility to flee to a foreign country, preferably the People's Republic of Albania or the People's Republic of China.

On September 8 at 10:15 pm, the Federal Council convened as a whole and agreed to give the head negotiator Furgler carte blanche to unilaterally decide whether to raid the embassy premises with special forces. On September 9, 0:30 a.m., Furgler ordered the rescue operation, codenamed "Operation Essen," to begin immediately.

On September 9 at 10:39 am, a policeman in plain clothes dropped off either multiple boxes or a food basket at the embassy doorstep, purportedly breakfast for the occupants of the house. The package actually contained a petard with tear gas and a flash. As the policeman spotted all four hostage takers in the entrance hall, he gave a hidden signal to the rest of the special forces. Seconds later, after an initial failed detonation, the petard exploded and units of the Stern elite antiterrorist squad raided the embassy. The raid successfully concluded 12 minutes later without any shots fired or any resistance from the hostage takers. Later, police forces also rescued an attaché who was trapped in the compound during the siege and was not found by the gunmen.

By the time special forces raided the premises, only five of the original 14 hostages were still held captive: a student, a diplomat who was ill, and six women had previously been released, while a diplomatic attaché had escaped through the roof. Some of the hostages would later reveal to Polish journalists that the gunmen had beaten and threatened to kill them.

It was later learned that the gunmen did not possess the 55 pounds of dynamite with which they had threatened to blow up the embassy building. A Škorpion submachine gun they carried was later revealed to only be a mockup. The group leader, Kruszyk, had served a nine year sentence in Austria for the 1969 armed holdup of a Viennese jewelry shop, during which he held the jeweler's family hostage, which lead some experts to believe that the seizure had been financially rather than politically motivated.

== Perpetrators ==
- Florian Kruszyk, 42, former officer of the SB
- Marek Michalski, 20
- Miroslaw Plewinski, 23
- Krysztof Wasilewski, 33

== Aftermath ==
The gunmen were sentenced to imprisonment on October 10, 1983, with their leader, Kruszyk, receiving six years of prison (Zuchthaus) and 15 years of banishment. The three other perpetrators were sentenced to 2.5 to three years of prison and five years of banishment. Extradition to Poland was rejected by Swiss authorities, noting that Poland was not part of a Western European agreement on the prosecution of terrorists.

== Secret documents ==
It was revealed in 2013 that around the time that the rescue operation occurred, members of the Federal Intelligence Service of Switzerland violated the Vienna Convention on Diplomatic Relations and illegally entered the embassy, seized diplomatic documents, brought them to the nearby federal prosecutor's office, photocopied them, and then returned them to the embassy. These documents contained reconnaissance reports about Swiss military airports, secret agents, Germany and NATO. When Swiss authorities returned documents to the Polish military attaché, among them a dossier labeled "Nato", the attaché stated that he has never seen the documents before. The police had not taken any pictures of the secret archive or the work place of the military attaché for unknown reasons.

Benno Schneider, head of the task force for hostage situations (Sonderstab Geiselnahmen) explicitly ordered that the documents be copied and then returned («Ich erteilte den Auftrag, wies die Beteiligten an, die Akten zu kopieren und nachher unversehrt in die Botschaft zurückzustellen.»). Despite consistent denial of secret seizure of the documents when talking to the press, Furgler has approved of copying the documents. An official report states that some of the documents were accidentally taken from the embassy in midst of the general disorder and heat of the moment.

== Film adaptation ==
Polish director Janusz Kidawa produced a movie based on the embassy attack in his 1984 film Ultimatum.

== See also ==
- 1955 seizure of the Romanian embassy in Bern
