= Norbert Ormai =

Hungarian colonel

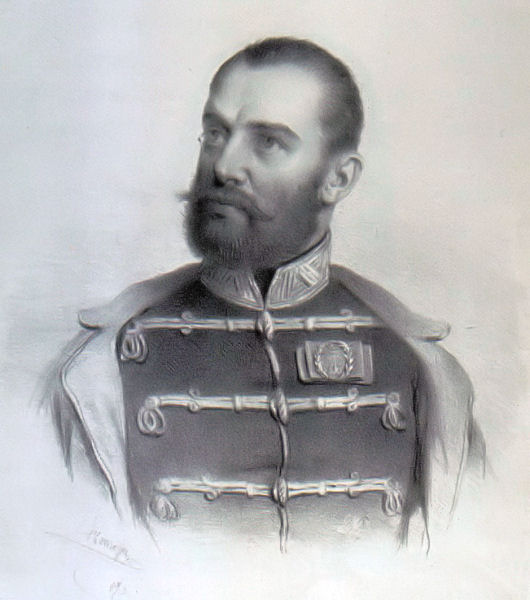
- Born: 28 May 1813; Dobřany, Bohemia
- Died: 22 August 1849 (aged 36) Arad, Kingdom of Hungary
- Rank: Colonel

Norbert Ormai 28 May 1813 – 22 August 1849), born Norbert Auffenberg, was a honvéd colonel in the Hungarian Army. He was executed for his part in the Hungarian Revolution of 1848.
