= Gheorghe Ștefănescu =

Romanian businessman convicted of bootlegging (1929 - 1981)

Gheorghe Ștefănescu (1929 – 14 December 1981) was a Romanian businessman at the centre of one of the largest corruption scandals during the Communist period, in the wine industry.

The administrator of a Bucharest liquor store on Calea Griviței, near the Basarab Bridge, from 1971 to 1978 he headed a network that profited from the alteration of wine. At Cotești vineyards, the director would claim poor production due to "natural disasters", thus leaving a secret surplus. These undeclared wines were then mixed (high quality with low quality), and the brew was sold at inflated prices, with the difference pocketed by Ștefănescu (nicknamed "Bachus") and his men. In seven years, over 400,000 litres of wine received without documentation were altered. They also mixed yeast rakia with plum țuică, but kept the same concentration of alcohol.

Ștefănescu was caught by chance in 1978. A Securitate lieutenant purchased wine for his own wedding, which was then delayed. Several weeks later, the officer sampled the wine and noticed that only a watery solution with reddish dregs remained. Over 250 Miliția agents and prosecutors were assigned to the case, and investigators searching Ștefănescu's house found over 18 kg (40 lb) of gold jewellery (worth some $360,000) and between 2.2 and 40 million lei in cash and checks. He also had an apartment in Bucharest, a villa at Breaza, and two Lada cars. In addition to wine stores all over Bucharest, Bachus' network included everyone from office bosses to party first secretaries and directors of government ministries, whom he gave money, jewellery and other bribes to have them look the other way or provide him with the required additives. Over 200 were sent to prison.

Ştefănescu was tried and sentenced to death in April 1980, being shot at Jilava Prison the following year and leaving a wife and son. Selling fraudulent wine (a "crime against the socialist order") earned him the death penalty; for his other crimes, treated in nine dossiers, he received only prison terms. Legend has it that, brought before dictator Nicolae Ceaușescu, who asked him what he wished to do with all his money, Ștefănescu replied, "I wanted to overthrow the regime!" An unofficial estimate of the amount of money he cost the Romanian state puts it at $4.5 million, in 1970s dollars.

In 1984, a film called Secretul lui Bachus was released based on the case, directed by Geo Saizescu and starring Ștefan Mihăilescu-Brăila.
