= Ioanid Gang =

The Ioanid Gang (Romanian: Banda Ioanid) is the name given by Communist propaganda to a group in Communist Romania named after two of its members, Alexandru and Paul Ioanid. They were accused of carrying out on 28 July 1959 the most famous bank robbery in a Communist state.

== Timeline ==
An armed group of six Jewish Romanian intellectuals and Communist Party cadres (Alexandru Ioanid, Paul Ioanid, Igor Sevianu, Monica Sevianu, Sașa Mușat, and Haralambie Obedeanu) were alleged to have stolen 1,600,000 Romanian lei (about 250,000 US dollars in 1959) from an armoured car of the National Bank of Romania in 1959. The first five were alleged to have been in a getaway car, while Obedeanu was alleged to have been in a telephone cabin, keeping the bank's phone line busy.

The case was investigated by the Securitate, Communist Romania's secret police, and the supposed perpetrators were arrested within two months. They were rounded up in night-time raids, tried behind closed doors, and all but one sentenced to death. The executions, also kept under secrecy, including for family members, were carried out in 1960.

Monica Sevianu, the only woman involved, had her sentence commuted to forced labor for life because she was pregnant with her second child. In 1964, following an amnesty of political prisoners, she was allowed to emigrate to Israel.

== "Gang" members ==
- Alexandru "Lică" Ioanid, birth name Herman D. Leibovici, born in 1920. Communist Party member and lieutenant-colonel of the police, he had been married to the sister-in-law of Alexandru Drăghici, head of the Securitate secret police. After holding different positions, among them that of head of the police legal department, from which he was fired in March 1959, he was pensioned two months later.
- Paul Ioanid, birth name Leibovici, born in 1923, the younger brother of Alexandru Ioanid. An engineer, aeronautics specialist and airplane pilot, he was a well-known newspaper and radio commentator on space flight issues. He had received his Ph.D. in Moscow, where he had studied with Andrei Tupolev and Oleg Antonov. A prominent Communist Party member, he had been a professor and head of the aeronautics department at the Military Academy. After working on behalf of Romania at the secret Soviet space programme, he was investigated by the Securitate upon returning home.
- Igor "Gugu" Sevianu, birth name Herșcovici, born in 1923. Sevianu was an aviation engineer and Communist Party member who had participated in sabotage operations against the Nazi German army during World War II, and had taken part in the August 1944 fights on Bucharest's streets that helped remove the German troops from the city. Sevianu had been a police lieutenant after the war until 1951, and had also worked at different times for the aviation department of the Interior Ministry, as a National Tourism Office (ONT) tour guide, and agitprop activist, but at the time of the incident had been unemployed since 1957. In 1959 the Sevianu couple and their two children were surviving on Monica Sevianu's income as private teacher.
- Monica Sevianu, birth name Monique Alfandary, born in 1923. A journalist, she had worked for the national radio station, but had been fired in 1957, the reason given being her lack of higher academic degrees. After serving part of her life-time sentence, she was released in 1964 through an amnesty decree for political crimes issued by Gheorghe Gheorghiu-Dej. She emigrated to Israel in 1970 where she died in 1977. She had already "made aliyah" once to British Mandate Palestine, where she had lived for three years until returning to Romania in 1948 and marrying Igor.
- Sașa Mușat, birth name Abrașa Glanzstein, born in 1924. Mușat had been a member of the Romanian Communist Party's youth organisation already during its underground years preceding King Michael's Coup of August 1944. A leader of the Social-Democratic youth organisation after WWII, with some considering him to be a Communist agent sent to infiltrate the SD movement. He was a close collaborator of Communist Party leader, Emil Bodnăraș, being also a cousin of his first wife. In 1948 he was sent on an espionage mission to France, but his cover was blown and he was expelled back to Romania. Here he worked as an associate professor and Party secretary at the History Department of the University of Bucharest, positions he was fired from in 1957 or 1958, the reason given being him lacking a PhD degree.
- Haralambie "Hary" Obedeanu, birth name Hary Lazarovici, born in 1921. Communist Party member and former employee of the Ministry of Interior. Obedeanu had worked until the end of 1958 as a journalist for Scînteia, the Communist Party newspaper, and – until being fired – as the dean of the Journalism Department of the Ștefan Gheorghiu Academy (the Party's political cadres academy).

== 1960 propaganda film ==
In 1960, the government issued a propaganda film, Reconstituirea ("Reconstruction"), to be viewed only by Communist Party members, which reconstructed the way in which the heist had allegedly been planned and carried out. The jailed members of the Ioanid Gang acted out their own roles, either simply forced or possibly having been told that their death sentences would be commuted in return.

== Controversy ==
=== Contradictions ===
There were several unusual things about the story in its most common version. Beyond accusations based on various ideological guidelines, no reasons for the alleged robbery, or for the Ioanid group to have perpetrated it, were ever given. Although the persons on trial were accused of intending to donate the money to Zionist organisations that would send Romanian Jews to Israel, the stolen sum was in lei, which at the time could not be exchanged for hard currency anywhere in the world. Besides, none of the accused had been Zionists.

Given that Communist Romania was a police state, and unprecedented measures of strict control and surveillance were supposed to have been enforced in all areas of society (phone calls were routinely monitored, correspondence was intercepted, and secret police informants were common) a plan such as the one allegedly designed by the group would have been exceedingly difficult to carry out. It is also highly unlikely that the members of the "Ioanid Gang" could have been unaware of these facts. One of them, Alexandru Ioanid, was a colonel in the Securitate and, according to Victor Frunză, he had been related through marriage to the Securitate chief Alexandru Drăghici (he had been married to, and recently divorced from, the sister of Drăghici's wife Marta Cziko; following the divorce, Drăghici had vowed to destroy him). During many months preceding July 1959 (the date of the alleged heist), at least one of the members, Obedeanu, was aware of being followed and of being constantly watched through binoculars by the Securitate from a building across the street from his apartment. Moreover, also for months preceding July 1959 the phones of the "Ioanid Gang" members had been tapped. In the aftermath, several of the friends with whom they had talked lost their jobs or positions.

After 28 July, the group was said to have engaged in reckless spending on luxuries, depicted in the original Reconstruction movie. It is, however, highly unlikely that a person living in Romania at the time, let alone such educated individuals, could have imagined being able to get away with such behaviour unnoticed by the surveillance apparatus. Moreover, in Obedeanu's case for example, the crew making the Reconstruction film resorted to bringing furnishing props, including carpets, furniture and curtains, to his apartment in order to show how he had spent the money. Obedeanu never really changed his spending habits, unlike apparently (according to Irene Lusztig) Sevianu, leading some to believe that, in trying to stage the event, authorities may have offered Sevianu money based on his more immediate needs (unlike the others, Sevianu was unemployed). Nora, Obedeanu's wife, was arrested at the same time as her husband but not accused; she was held for two months, which was the maximum allowed by law at the time. It has been indicated that Nora was interrogated only about the content of conversations among group members, and found out about bank robbery accusations only upon her release from prison.

All these aspects, together with the numerous cases of sentences based on false accusations, have led some, including relatives of the alleged robbers, to doubt that any robbery actually took place or that those charged with the crime really committed it, especially as there was no actual direct identification of the accused by the supposed witnesses. One conjecture is that the case was manufactured by the government in an attempt to justify a purge in the Securitate ranks – by accusing officers of incompetence in solving the case – as well as to remove most remaining Jews from leading positions inside the government and the Communist Party. Yet another contention with no evidence is that the executions were staged, so that the five men would have their records erased and become undercover agents abroad. Since most evidence has been filtered by the Securitate, the truth is extremely hard to discern, especially since Securitate files are unlikely to contain any self-incriminating notes of the staging of the heist, and restrict themselves to following the official story-line.

=== Anti-Jewish party purge scenario ===
All those accused in the robbery were Jewish Communist intellectuals, all of whom had been party members during the years of underground activity (between 1924–1944 the Communist Party had been outlawed in Romania). A large party purge was put in motion in 1958, a year characterised by a move away from Soviet Russia – the Soviet troops stationed in Romania since 1944 were leaving the country – and critics of party chief Gheorghe Gheorghiu-Dej are ousted. The purge takes the shape of a "Romanian ethnicisation" of the party, ethnic Jews and Hungarians being the target. The chief ideologue put in charge of the purge was Leonte Răutu who, in spite of his Jewish roots, had become a stauch Romanian national communist. The "gang" members were even accused of planning to assassinate Răutu. Vladimir Tismăneanu sees the whole affair in the light of a typical Bolshevist show trial, with the Romanian national communists set out to remove Jewish intellectuals from the party. Some Jewish intellectuals, though being former underground fighters, are accused of lacking working class consciousness. Paul Ioanid's Soviet connections have become a burden, and the personal vendetta of Alexandru Drăghici and his wife Marta (née Cziko) against Alexandru Ioanid for having divorced the sister of Martha Drăghici, is given the ideological spin of him having gravely strayed from "Socialist morals".

=== Blackmail scenario ===
Based on what is known about the group members (journalists, a physicist, a history professor, and a Securitate colonel, all of them were fully cognizant of the Romanian situation) and about the political climate at the time, as well as on recollections of some family members, another scenario also seems likely. Following prolonged Securitate surveillance of the group, which resulted in the accumulation of evidence about conversations with dissident tones, members may have been blackmailed including threatened with harm against their families and themselves, and promised some reprieve or even permission to leave the country with their families, if they went along with the staging of the robbery to serve several government and personal purposes.

In this event, the government failed to uphold its end of the bargain. As a parallel, in what was a highly unusual move for those times when nobody was allowed to leave Romania, another Jewish Securitate officer, Ion Crișan, incidentally described as "friend" of the Ioanid group, was permitted to leave the country with his family and go to Brazil around 1961, shortly after the alleged incident; this has led some to believe that he may have been the agent through whom the government communicated its promises and made them credible.

== In culture ==
Apart from the original Reconstruction movie produced by the Romanian state and widely screened before Communist Party members, there have been several other movies and documentaries, including Reconstruction (2001) by Irene Lusztig and The Great Communist Robbery (2004) by Alexandru Solomon. The film Closer to the Moon (2014) by Nae Caranfil, starring Harry Lloyd, Vera Farmiga, Mark Strong and Joe Armstrong, is fictional and very loosely connected to the real events.

== See also ==
- Reconstruction—the documentary film made by Irene Lusztig

== Sources ==
- (in Romanian) Doriana Galor, "Arena: Marele jaf din 1959 la Banca Națională" ("Arena: The Great 1959 National Bank Robbery"), at the BBC Romanian section site
- Victor Frunză, Istoria stalinismului în România ("The History of Stalinism in Romania"), Humanitas, Bucharest, 1990
- Direct recollections of family members.
