= Pompiliu Ștefu =

Romanian typographer and anti-fascist

Pompiliu Ștefu (August 10, 1910 – March 28, 1942) was a Romanian typographer, communist activist and anti-fascist militant executed by the Nazi-aligned authorities during World War II along with a fellow militant, the socialist Nicolae Mohănescu.

== Biography ==
=== Early life and activism ===
Born in Turnu Severin, Ștefu completed his primary studies in his home town and, after graduating an industrial school, joined the Scrisul Românesc publishing house in Craiova as an apprentice monotype operator. Following his discharge from compulsory military service, in 1934, he decided to move to Romania's capital, Bucharest, where the strength of the typographers' unions ensured better work conditions. After short stints as a compositor at Slova and Cugetarea, he was employed by Cartea Românească in 1935. Being noticed by the communist-inspired workers active at the publishing house, Ștefu was invited to take part in the group's outings near Bucharest, being introduced to anti-capitalist and anti-fascist ideas. Promoted by his foreman, Constantin Tănăsescu, to the monotype department, he came to know Teohari Georgescu, future communist minister, who at the time was directing the Communist Party of Romania (PCR)'s efforts among typographers. By 1937, Ștefu had become a leading member of the local chapter of the Gutenberg union, helping organise a strike in the publishing house.

Becoming a member of the PCR later that year, Ștefu joined the party cell at the State Publishing House, where he had found employment as a monotype operator. In the following years he took part in the cell's clandestine activities, distributing leaflets and manifestos against the exploitation of workers. As unions were disbanded by the fascist-inspired royal dictatorship instituted in 1938, most of the communists joined the government-sponsored guilds, attempting to direct them towards their own objectives. The new political situation also brought a rapprochement between socialist and communist workers, in spite of the opposition of some Social-Democratic leaders who had joined the regime. The politically active workers continued to have meetings outside the guilds, with Ștefu noted for reading out loud articles from the classics of Marxism, such as Lafargue's The Right to be Lazy. He also proved popular among his colleagues, who provided monetary support when he fell ill due to lung problems in February 1939.

=== World War II ===
During the autumn of 1941 Ștefu met Nicolae Mohănescu, a former socialist activist and a worker at the state-owned Monitorul Oficial publishing house. The two were tasked by the PCR with operating a clandestine printing house, which allowed the party to continue its propaganda among Bucharest's workers despite increasing repression from the Ion Antonescu dictatorship. In September 1941, after Romania joined the German-led invasion of the Soviet Union, Ștefu started contacts with another communist typographer, Tudor, whose real identity was never revealed. Across several meetings, the activists discussed about the political situation of the country, the fate of Northern Transylvania, and the need to create a united patriotic front that would overthrow the Axis-aligned government and join the Soviet and British armies against Germany. Tudor also provided him with manifestos, and suggested he raised money for the communists held in internment camps by the regime. Ștefu related the discussions to Mohănescu and convinced him to also raise money from his colleagues at Monitorul Oficial. In the same period, Ștefu and his fellow activist Tănăsescu, using a makeshift printing device, produced flyers calling for "bread, peace and liberty", glueing them to the walls in proletarian neighbourhoods, to the annoyance of the secret police. Ștefu also offered his own home as a safe-house for meetings among party-members.

Redrafted for a military concentration in 1941, Ștefu was discharged in early 1942 and re-established contacts with Mohănescu, which began participating in the clandestine meetings of the communist activists and sympathisers. The two also continued their work on the production and distribution of anti-fascist manifestos. On February 24, 1942, one of Mohănescu's colleagues was reported to the management for reading articles the former had brought for distribution at the workplace. The articles, transcripts of Stalin's radio speeches on the occasion of the recent anniversary of the October Revolution, had been provided by Ștefu. The following morning, secret police started rounding up workers known for their communism, first at Monitorul Oficial and then among the other typographers. Informed about the imminent investigation by Tănăsescu's wife, Ștefu had been able to destroy all party documents in his home, before being apprehended at his workplace. Officially, he was arrested for owning "subversive documents", as the authorities had found among his belongings at the State Publishing House a photo of Teohari Georgescu, by that time one of the leaders of PCR condemned to forced labour. Also arrested the same day were Ștefu's wife and the painter George Löwendal, a family friend whose portrait of Ștefu was found at the latter's home.

=== Trial and execution ===
During the following days, the arrested were held under solitary confinement in the basement the Bucharest Police Prefecture, and torture was often used in the attempt to extract further information about the PCR organisation in the city. Ștefu however refused to implicate anybody else. Thus, Löwendal was set free soon after due to lack evidence. Unbeknown to the secret police, during the previous winter he had invited Ștefu in his home to listen to the Allied-aligned Radio România Liberă, Radio Moscow, and Radio London, also transcribing and translating foreign-language news about the frontline. After a week, Ștefu's wife, who broke down under torture, was set free, while he and Mohănescu were moved to the Malmaison prison; on March 4, the two, along the workers who had contributed Mohănescu's fund raise, were put under trial before the Court Martial of the Bucharest High Command.

The trial procedures took place on a single day, March 14, 1942; Ștefu and Mohănescu stood accused of "crime of propaganda" and establishing a "subversive organisation". Both admitted to having distributed propaganda and raised money for imprisoned typographers. Despite favourable depositions by their colleagues, the two were sentenced to death for "distributing manifestos with a subversive character". The other five workers implicated in the trial were each sentenced to three years of penal servitude and fined 500 lei for having "provided material support to an association forbidden by the law". The same night, a munitions train was blown up in Bucharest's Gara de Nord, reportedly in retaliation for the heavy sentences handed down. Ștefu and Mohănescu appealed the decision, hoping their sentence to be commuted to forced labour for life. However, as a new munitions train set for the front-line was detonated on the Bucharest-Ploiești railway line, the regime decided to set an example, and refused any reprieve. Consequently, the two were executed by a firing squad near Jilava, on March 28, 1942, and hastily interred without notifying the families.

After a short period of time, Tănăsescu was able to recover some the materials hidden by Ștefu before his arrest, and along with other activists succeeded in re-establishing a network. The first number of the illegal newspaper România Liberă, put out in January 1943 by the communist-affiliated Union of Patriots, singled out Ștefu, Mohănescu and Filimon Sârbu as victims of Antonescu's dictatorship. After the regime was toppled and Romania joined the Allies, the two were honoured as martyrs of the working class. As early as April 1945, they were publicly commemorated in a large meeting in Bucharest attended by leaders of the Communist and Social-Democratic parties. Their remains were later moved to the Liberty Park mausoleum, where they stood until removed in the aftermath of the 1989 Revolution.
