= Francisc Panet =

Romanian chemical engineer and communist activist

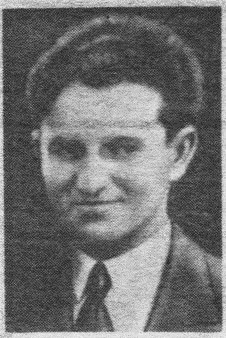
Francisc Panet.

Francisc Panet or Paneth (1907 – November 7, 1941) was a Romanian chemical engineer and communist activist executed by the pro-Nazi authorities during the Second World War. He was active in the Romanian Communist Party and in the Communist Party of Czechoslovakia.

== Life ==
Panet was born in a wealthy Jewish family in Târgu Mureș (in Austria-Hungary at the time). He joined the local section of the Communist Party in the 1920s. In the early 1930s, he studied at the Deutsche Technische Hochschule in Brno, Czechoslovakia, where he met other two Romanian communist activists, Valter Roman and Gabriel Mureșan. According to them, Panet had a correspondence during that time with Albert Einstein, even visiting him in Berlin in 1932.

In 1941, after the Axis attack on the Soviet Union, Panet was part of a group tasked by the Romanian Communist Party to prepare explosive material for use in sabotage actions against German troops stationed in Romania. The group, which also included Panet's wife, Lili, Ada Marinescu (Ada Iosipovici), dr. Adalbert Kornhauser, and Elisabeta Naghi (Erzsébet Nagy), organized a laboratory in the bathroom of Panet's house in Bucharest. In October, the Panets were arrested by the Siguranța Statului (Romania's secret police) and all explosives were confiscated.

On November 5, 1941, the Panet couple was brought to the Jilava Prison. The next day, after a two-hour-long summary trial by the Court Martial of the Military Command of Bucharest, the members of the Panet group were sentenced to death for membership in the Communist Party and for "subversive activity against the security of the state". On November 7, the Panets were executed by a firing squad in a forest near Jilava Prison. According to a sergeant who participated in the execution, quoted by Vasile Vaida (a cellmate), Francisc Panet began to sing "The Internationale" before being shot.

== See also ==
- Ștefan Plavăț
- Filimon Sârbu
