= 1955 seizure of the Romanian embassy in Bern =

The 1955 seizure of the Romanian embassy in Bern, also known in Romania as the Bern incident (Romanian: Incidentul de la Berna), was the brief seizure of the Romanian embassy in Bern, Switzerland, by a group of Romanian émigrés who opposed the then-ruling communist regime between 14 and 16 February 1955.

== Events ==
The attack was planned and led by Oliviu Beldeanu, a sculptor born in 1924 in Dej. At the age of 15 he became a member of Frunză Verde ("Green Leaf"), a youth organisation associated with the fascist Iron Guard, and after the end of World War II he joined the anti-communist resistance movement. In 1949, he fled to the Socialist Federal Republic of Yugoslavia, only to return a few months later, allegedly as an agent of the UDBA. In 1951, Beldeanu arrived in Italy; he later settled in Konstanz, West Germany.

In 1954, Beldeanu began preparing the assault on the Romanian embassy: he travelled several times to Switzerland, acquired the needed weapons and tools, and held training sessions with the other members of the group (Ion Chirilă, Stan Codrescu, Dumitru Ochiu and Tudor Ciochină).

On the evening of 14 February 1955, the group drove from Konstanz to Bern, broke into the embassy around midnight and entered the embassy's driver's residence. The members of the group then proceeded to discreetly search for secret documents.

Around 2:00 AM, Aurel Șețu, the embassy's driver (and possibly a Securitate agent) returned and entered into an altercation with Codrescu and Ochiu, following which Șețu was shot. Though hurt, the driver managed to leave the annex building, and was later discovered heavily bleeding under a tree. He was then transported to the hospital where he died. After the shooting most of the embassy's staff had fled.

The Swiss police was notified by the ambassador and surrounded the building, but without intervening, since the ambassador did not allow them to enter the property at first. The group demanded the release from Romanian prisons of several important personalities, such as Dinu Brătianu. On the night of 15/16 February, Dumitru Ochiu exited the embassy, carrying with him a number of documents; he was immediately arrested by the Swiss police. The rest of the group surrendered the next day.

The police returned the stolen documents immediately to the Romanian legation, thereby arising a lot of speculations about their content. The news agency "Globe Press" pretended that Aurel Șețu was the actual head of the Romanian legation and a senior Securitate officer and that the stolen documents were ciphered messages for Moscow. As the police of Bern later found out, this information had in fact been invented by a Czechoslovak refugee.

== Motivations ==
According to its organizers, the attack's purpose was to attract international attention to the abuses, injustices and human rights violations perpetrated by the communist Romanian government, as well as exposing the espionage activities of the Romanian embassy in Switzerland.

However, the Romanian government of the time accused the Iron Guard structure in exile (under the leadership of Horia Sima) and Western intelligence agencies of masterminding a fascist anti-Romanian plot with the complicity of the Swiss authorities.

Some commentators have suggested that the group was indeed acting on behalf of a foreign intelligence service, looking for documents related specifically to covert Romanian agents in the Western program of parachuting agents into areas of the Eastern Bloc.

== Aftermath ==
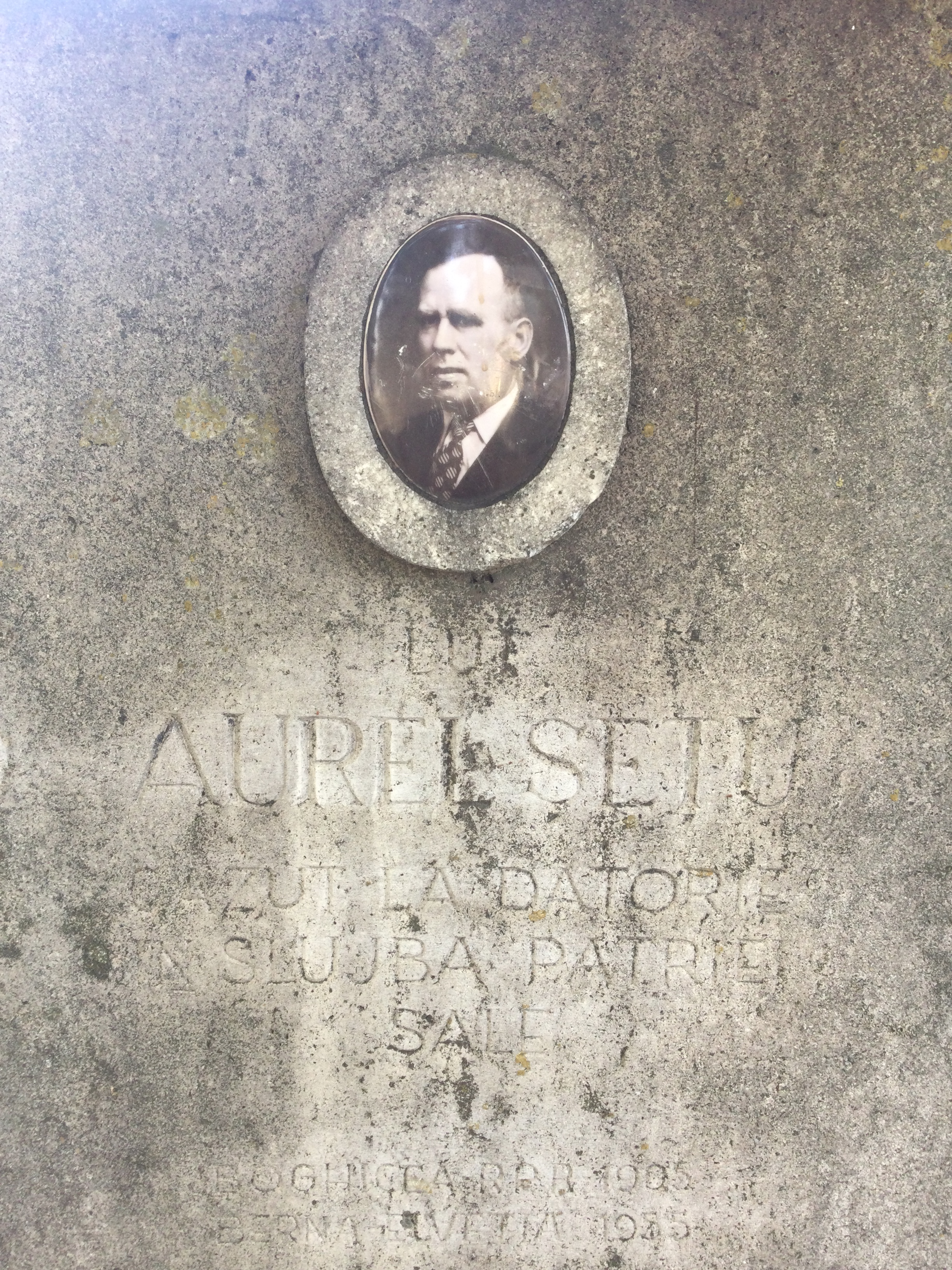
Grave of Aurel Șețu in Ghencea Cemetery

The members of the group were tried in Bern. Oliviu Beldeanu was sentenced to four years in prison, Stan Codrescu (who had shot Aurel Șețu) to three and a half years, Ion Chirilă to three and a half years and Dumitru Ochiu to a year and four months.

In Romania, protest gatherings were staged in several towns and a large commemorative meeting held in Bucharest on the occasion of Aurel Șețu's burial.

Oliviu Beldeanu was released from prison in 1957, but the communist regime did not intend to leave his action go unpunished. He was lured to West Berlin and abducted by Stasi and Securitate agents, then taken to Bucharest, subjected to a kangaroo trial, and executed on 18 February 1960.

== See also ==
- 1982 seizure of the Polish embassy in Bern

== Bibliography ==
- (in Romanian) Ștejărel Olaru, "Cei cinci care au speriat Estul" ("The Five Who Frightened the East"), in Timpul, September 2003
- Cristian Troncotă, Istoria serviciilor secrete românești: de la Cuza la Ceaușescu ("History of the Romanian Secret Services: from Cuza to Ceaușescu"), Editura Ion Cristoiu S.A., Bucharest, 1999 ISBN 973-99233-0-5
