= Filimon Sârbu =

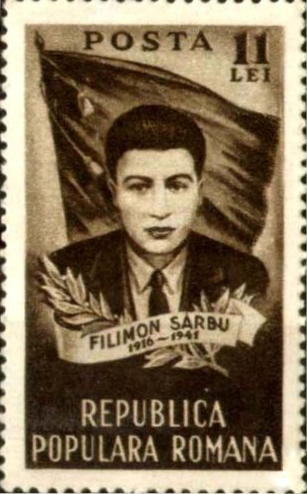
Filimon Sârbu on a 1951 stamp issued by the Romanian People's Republic

Filimon Sârbu (August 10, 1916 – July 19, 1941) was a Romanian communist activist and anti-fascist militant executed by the pro-Nazi authorities during World War II. After the war, he was acclaimed as a hero by the communist government.

Sârbu was born into a family of workers in Herepeia, Transylvania. His father, a railway worker, was sacked in 1926 for his participation in the strikes of the early 1920s, and the family had to move to Constanța by 1930. Due to lack of material means, the young Sârbu was forced to abandon school after completing primary education, and in October 1930 he started as an apprentice lathe operator at the Workshops of the Directorate of Maritime Ports in Constanța. There he joined the worker's movement and came under communist influence; in 1933 he was dismissed for his political opinions, but was readmitted under pressure from his colleagues. In that period he also took part in the meetings of the National Antifascist Committee, a front organization of the Romanian Communist Party, banned by the government in the 1920s. Arrested along other activists in 1936 during such an antifascist conference, he was condemned by a Military Tribunal to 6 months of jail.

In 1938 he was drafted in the Romanian Army and assigned to the border area of Carei. In August 1940 the area, along with all Northern Transylvania was awarded to Hungary. Sârbu's protests against the territorial settlement led to his disciplinary transfer to the 10th Vânători de munte Battalion in Târnăveni. Discharged in April 1941, he rapidly reestablished contacts with the antifascist organizations, first in Brașov, then back in Constanța.

After joining the Union of Communist Youth (UTC) in 1941, he received the task to organize sabotage acts against the fascist forces in the city and in the port. He also became the Secretary of the county organization of the UTC. Sârbu was also responsible for spreading anti-war propaganda leaflets in the factories of Constanța.

According to Vartan Arachelian and Corneliu Coposu, Sârbu was part of a group who set fire to a German military depot in Constanța, and signaled Soviet warplanes at night. On June 22, 1941 (the day Operation Barbarossa was launched), Sârbu was arrested along four other anti-fascist militants by Romania's secret police during a clandestine meeting on the Pescărie beach, in Mamaia. The purpose of the meeting was described by the official indictment as "instigation to sabotage acts against the state order". After a summary trial by the Court Martial of the Bucharest Territorial High Command, he was sentenced to death on July 4. On the evening of July 19, he was executed by firing squad at Jilava Prison, in a place named Valea Piersicilor (Valley of the Peaches). Sârbu was the only one to be executed, the other 4 activists tried in the same case being sentenced to prison.

== See also ==
- Francisc Panet
- Ștefan Plavăț
