= Bologa =

- Location within Romania

Location
- Country: Romania
- Counties: Bistrița-Năsăud, Mureș
- Villages: Porumbenii, Sângeorgiu de Câmpie, Deleni

Physical characteristics
- Mouth: Șes
  - coordinates: 46.6650°N 24.2645°E
- Length: 15 km (9.3 mi)
- Basin size: 32 km^{2} (12 sq mi)

Basin features
- Progression: Șes→ Pârâul de Câmpie→ Mureș→ Tisza→ Danube→ Black Sea

The Bologa is a left tributary of the river Șes in Romania.

== Course and description ==
It flows into the Șes near Văleni. Its length is 15 km (9.3 mi) and its basin size is 32 km^{2} (12 sq mi).

== Wildlife ==
The Bologa supports wildlife similar to its parent river, Pârâul de Câmpie. These include bottom-dwelling fish like the European minnow, stone loach, European chub, and bitterling. Other microfauna inhabit this river, like freshwater amphipods and bloodworms that act as food sources for the fish and decomposers in the ecosystem.
