= Alexandru Cecal =

Romanian chemist (1940–2021)

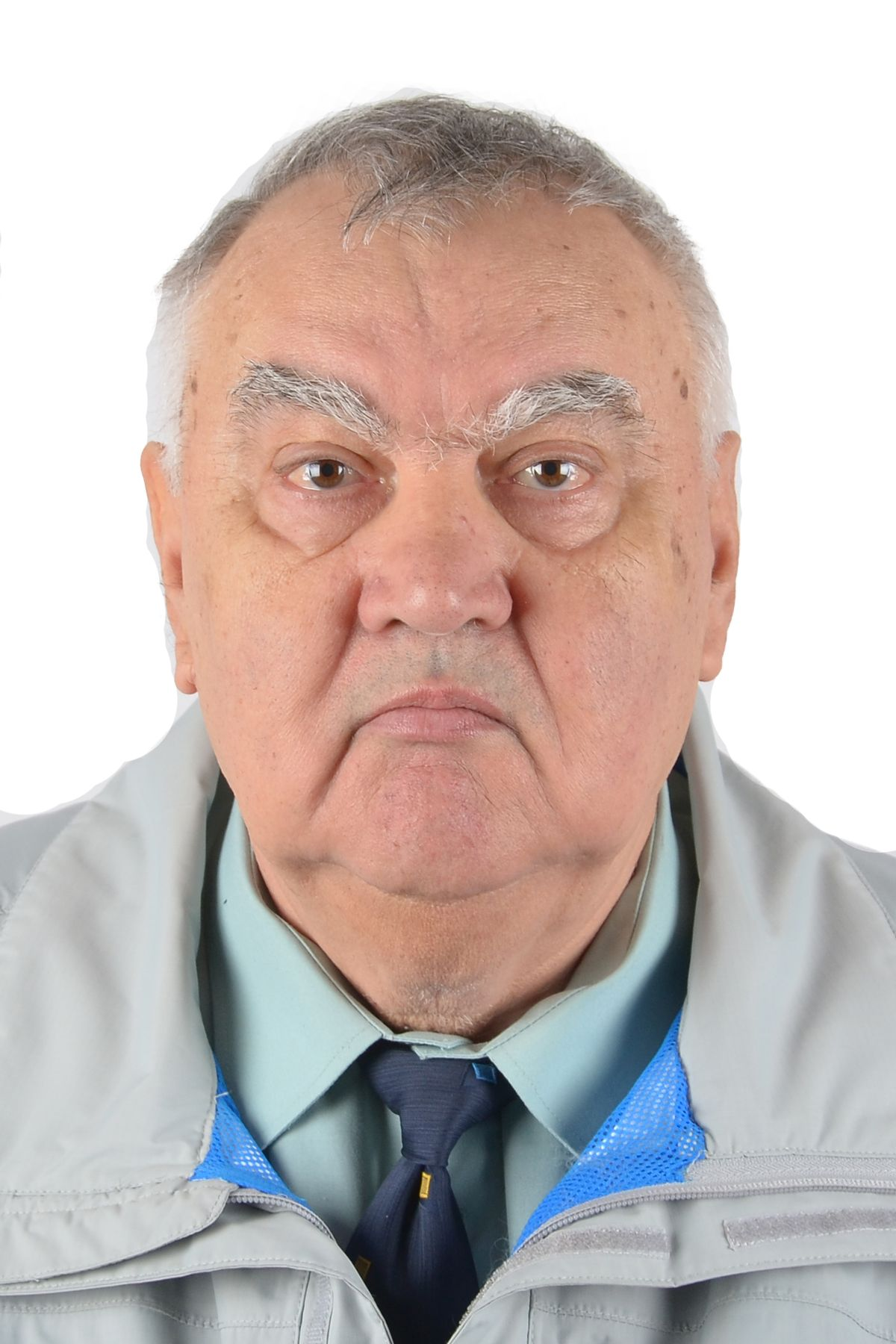
- Born: July 18, 1940; Cahul, Moldavian SSR
- Died: November 1, 2021 (aged 81); Iași, Romania
- Education: University of Bucharest; Alexandru Ioan Cuza University
- Scientific career
- Fields: Radiochemistry and nuclear chemistry
- Workplaces: Alexandru Ioan Cuza University
- Thesis: Kinetics of the isotopic exchange reactions in Tl(I)–Tl(III) complexes with different ligands (1972)
- Doctoral advisor: Hans Adam Schneider

Alexandru Cecal (July 18, 1940 – November 1, 2021) was a chemist, professor at the Alexandru Ioan Cuza University of Iași, Romania, known especially for his contributions in the field of radiochemistry.

== Education ==
Cecal was born in Cahul, Moldavian SSR and attended the primary school in Pianu, Alba County (1947–1951), continuing his studies (1951–1957) at the Boys' Middle School (former Mihai Viteazul Theoretical High School, now Horea, Cloșca and Crișan National College) from Alba Iulia.

Between 1958 and 1963, he attended the University of Bucharest (Physical chemistry/Radiochemistry). In 1972 he gained his Ph.D. in chemistry at the Alexandru Ioan Cuza University of Iași, with a thesis entitled "Kinetics of the isotopic exchange reactions in Tl(I)–Tl(III) complexes with different ligands", written under the supervision of Hans Adam Schneider. He fulfilled several postdoctoral appointments in universities and research centers such as Technical University of Munich (group of Hans-Joachim Born), TU Dresden, Forschungszentrum Karlsruhe, Moscow State University (group of Alexander Nesmeyanov), Laval University, etc.

== Relevant publications ==
- Kim, J.I.; Cecal, A.; Born, H.-J.; Gomaa, E.A. (1978). "Preferential solvation of single ions: a critical study of the Ph4AsPh4B assumption for single ion thermodynamics in mixed aqueous-acetonitrile and aqueous-NN-dimethylformamide solvents". Zeitschrift für Physikalische Chemie. 110 (2): 209–227. doi:10.1524/zpch.1978.110.2.209. S2CID 101411418.
- Cecal., A. (1983). "Radiochemical study of the corrosion process of some types of carbon steel in acid media". Electrochimica Acta. 28 (5): 681–684. doi:10.1016/0013-4686(83)85064-6.
- Cecal, A.; Palamaru, M.N.; Juverdeanu, A.; Giosan, M. (1996). "Radiochemical study of the kinetics of crystal growth in gels". Journal of Crystal Growth. 158 (1): 181–184. Bibcode:1996JCrGr.158..181C. doi:10.1016/0022-0248(95)00451-3.
- Cecal, A.; Rudic, V.; Gulea, A.; Palamaru, I.; Humelnicu, D.; Goanță, M.; Șalaru, V.V. (1997). "Recuperation of uranyl ions from effluents by means of microbiological collectors". Waste Management. 17 (1): 97–99. Bibcode:1997WaMan..17...97C. doi:10.1016/S0956-053X(97)00032-9.
- Cecal, A.; Goanță, M.; Palamaru, M.N.; Stoicescu, T.; Popa, K.; Paraschivescu, A.; Anița, V. (2001). "Use of some oxides in radiolytical decomposition of water". Radiation Physics and Chemistry. 62 (4): 333–336. Bibcode:2001RaPC...62..333C. doi:10.1016/S0969-806X(01)00201-8.
- Cecal, A.; Humelnicu, D.; Popa, K.; Rudic, V.; Gulea, A.; Palamaru, I.; Nemțoi, G. (2000). "Bioleaching of UO_{2}^{2+} ions from poor uranium ores by means of cyanobacteria". Journal of Radioanalytical and Nuclear Chemistry. 245 (2): 427–429. doi:10.1023/A:1006707815553. S2CID 93833531.
- Cecal, A.; Popa, K.; Potoroacă, V.; Puică-Melniciuc, N. (2002). "Decontamination of radioactive liquid wastes by hydrophytic vegetal organisms". Journal of Radioanalytical and Nuclear Chemistry. 251 (2): 257–261. doi:10.1023/A:1014864226648. S2CID 98688690.
- Pavel, C.C.; Popa, K.; Bîlbă, N.; Cecal, A.; Cozma, D.G.; Pui, A. (2003). "The sorption of some radiocations on microporous titanosilicate ETS-10". Journal of Radioanalytical and Nuclear Chemistry. 258 (2): 243–248. doi:10.1023/A:1026269217431. S2CID 94497639.
- Popa, K.; Cecal, A.; Drochioiu, G.; Pui, A.; Humelnicu, D. (2003). "Saccharomyces cerevisiae as uranium bioaccumulating material: The influence of contact time, pH and anion nature". Nukleonik. 48: 121–125.
- Cecal, A.; Popa, K.; Drăghici, C.L. (2005). "Radiometric method for the study of the corrosion reactions of steel samples in strongly acidic media". Radiochimica Acta. 93 (2): 115–117. doi:10.1524/ract.93.2.115.59418. S2CID 97400400.
- Popa, K.; Pavel, C.C.; Bîlbă, N.; Cecal, A. (2006). "Purification of waste waters containing ^{60}Co^{2+},^{115m}Cd^{2+} and ^{203}Hg^{2+}radioactive ions by ETS-4 titanosilicate". Journal of Radioanalytical and Nuclear Chemistry. 269: 155–160. doi:10.1007/s10967-006-0245-z. S2CID 98536089.
- Popa, K.; Palamaru, M.N.; Iordan, A.R.; Humelnicu, D.; Drochioiu, G.; Cecal, A. (2006). "Laboratory analyses of ^{60}Co^{2+}, ^{65}Zn^{2+} and ^{55+59}Fe^{3+} radiocations uptake by Lemna minor". Isotopes in Environmental and Health Studies. 42 (1): 87–85. doi:10.1080/10256010500384655. PMID 16500757. S2CID 6918167.
- Humelnicu, D.; Drochioiu, G.; Sturza, M.; Cecal, A.; Popa, K. (2006). "Kinetic and thermodynamic aspects of U(VI) and Th(IV) sorption on a zeolitic volcanic tuff". Journal of Radioanalytical and Nuclear Chemistry. 270 (3): 637–640. doi:10.1007/s10967-006-0473-2. S2CID 96178518.
- Popa, K.; Murariu, M.; Molnar, R.; Schlosser, G.; Cecal, A.; Drochioiu, G. (2007). "Effect of radioactive and non-radioactive mercury on wheat germination and the anti-toxic role of glutathione". Isotopes in Environmental and Health Studies. 43 (2): 105–116. doi:10.1080/10256010701362112. PMID 17558748. S2CID 1902261.
- Cecal, Alexandru; Humelnicu, Diana; Rudic, Valeriu; Cepoi, Liliana; Dumitru, Gânju; Cojocari, Angela (2012). "Uptake of uranyl ions from uranium ores and sludges by means of Spirulina platensis, Porphyridium cruentum and Nostok linckia alga". Bioresource Technology. 118: 19–23. doi:10.1016/j.biortech.2012.05.053. PMID 22695141.
