= Valea Morii (Pârâul de Câmpie) =

Valea Morii Matca
- Location within Romania

Location
- Country: Romania
- Counties: Cluj County, Mureș County
- Villages: Crișeni, Frata, Valea Largă, Grădini

Physical characteristics
- Mouth: Pârâul de Câmpie
  - coordinates: 46.5992°N 24.1013°E
- Length: 27 km (17 mi)
- Basin size: 153 km^{2} (59 sq mi)

Basin features
- Progression: Pârâul de Câmpie→ Mureș→ Tisza→ Danube→ Black Sea
- Tributaries
  - left: Frata
  - right: La Râpă

The Valea Morii is a right tributary of the Pârâul de Câmpie in Romania. It flows into the Pârâul de Câmpie near Grădini. Its length is 27 km (17 mi) and its basin size is 153 km^{2} (59 sq mi).
