= Frata (river) =

- Location within Romania

Location
- Country: Romania
- Counties: Cluj County, Mureș County
- Villages: Năoiu, Vișinelu, Oaș

Physical characteristics
- Mouth: Valea Morii
  - location: near Frata
  - coordinates: 46.6979°N 24.0864°E
- Length: 12 km (7.5 mi)
- Basin size: 38 km^{2} (15 sq mi)

Basin features
- Progression: Valea Morii→ Pârâul de Câmpie→ Mureș→ Tisza→ Danube→ Black Sea

The Frata is a left tributary of the river Valea Morii in Romania. It flows into the Valea Morii near the village Frata. Its length is 12 km (7.5 mi) and its basin size is 38 km^{2} (15 sq mi).
