= Fifth Maurer cabinet =

Romanian government

- 107th Cabinet of Romania

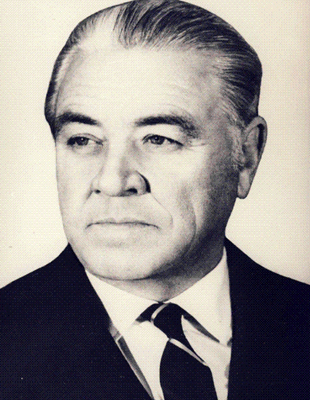
- Date formed: 13 March 1969
- Date dissolved: 28 March 1974

People and organisations
- President of the State Council: Nicolae Ceaușescu
- President of the Council of Ministers: Ion Gheorghe Maurer (PCR)
- First Vice President of the Council of Ministers: Ilie Verdeț (PCR)
- No. of ministers: 41
- Total no. of members: 34
- Member party: PCR
- Status in legislature: One-party state

History
- Election: 1969
- Legislature term: 6th Great National Assembly
- Predecessor: Maurer IV
- Successor: Mănescu I

The fifth Maurer cabinet was the government of Romania from 13 March 1969 to 28 March 1974.

== Changes in the government ==
August 19, 1969 - The Ministry of Transport was established, by merging the Ministry of Railways with the Ministry of Road, Naval and Air Transport; former Minister Ion Baicu was dismissed from office for "unsatisfactory activity"; the Minister of Railways, Florian Dănălache, was also dismissed from office. October 11, 1969 - The Ministry of Forestry Economy was renamed the Ministry of Wood Industry. October 11, 1969 - The Ministries of Industrial Construction were established: the Ministry of Construction Materials Industry. November 18, 1969 - The Superior Council of Agriculture was transformed into the Ministry of Agriculture and Forestry. March 13, 1970 - The Ministry of Mining Industry and Geology was established, by merging the Ministry of Mines and the State Committee for Geology. December 25, 1970 - The Ministry of Tourism was established. January 26, 1971 - The Ministry of Agriculture, Food Industry, Forestry and Waters was established. The Minister of State Secretary for Agriculture, the President of the National Council of Waters and the Head of the Department of Food Industry became members of the Council of Ministers. April 1, 1971 - The Ministry of Transport and Telecommunications was established, by merging the Ministry of Transport with the Ministry of Posts and Telecommunications. April 1, 1971 - The Ministry of Mines, Petroleum and Geology was established, by merging the Ministry of Mining Industry and Geology and the Ministry of Petroleum. September 16, 1971 - The Ministry of Technical and Material Supply and Control of Fixed Assets Management was established. September 16, 1971 - The State Committee for Culture and Art changed its name to the Council for Socialist Culture and Education. November 17, 1971 - The Ministry of Education and Training was established, which took over the powers of the Ministry of Education. January 25, 1972 - The Ministry of Forestry Economy and Building Materials was established, through the merger of the Ministry of Wood Industry, the Ministry of Building Materials Industry and the Department of Forestry within the Ministry of Agriculture, Food Industry, Forestry and Water. November 1, 1972 - The following were established: the Ministry of Heavy Machine Building Industry and the Ministry of Machine Tool Building and Electrical Engineering. November 1, 1972 - The Ministry of Armed Forces changed its name to the Ministry of National Defense.

== Composition ==
The ministers of the cabinet were as follows:

Portfolio	Minister	Took office	Left office
President of the Council of Ministers	Ion Gheorghe Maurer	13 March 1969	28 March 1974
First Vice President of the Council of Ministers	Ilie Verdeț	13 March 1969	28 March 1974
Vice President of the Council of Ministers	János Fazekas	13 March 1969	28 March 1974
Vice President of the Council of Ministers	Leonte Răutu	13 March 1969	28 February 1972
Vice President of the Council of Ministers	Paul Niculescu-Mizil	28 February 1972	28 March 1974
Vice President of the Council of Ministers	Iosif Banc	13 March 1969	24 April 1972
Vice President of the Council of Ministers	Gheorghe (Gogu) Rădulescu	13 March 1969	28 March 1974
Vice President of the Council of Ministers	Emil Drăgănescu	13 March 1969	28 March 1974
Vice President of the Council of Ministers	Mihai Marinescu	13 March 1969	28 March 1974
Vice President of the Council of Ministers	Ion Pățan	13 March 1969	28 March 1974
Vice President of the Council of Ministers	Virgil Trofin	13 October 1972	28 March 1974
Vice President of the Council of Ministers	Manea Mănescu	13 October 1972	28 March 1974
Minister of Interior	Cornel Onescu	13 March 1969	24 April 1972
Minister of Interior	Ion Stănescu	24 April 1972	17 March 1973
Minister of Interior	Emil Bobu	17 March 1973	28 March 1974
Minister of Foreign Affairs	Corneliu Mănescu	13 March 1969	23 October 1972
Minister of Foreign Affairs	George Macovescu	23 October 1972	28 March 1974
Minister of Justice	Adrian Dimitriu	13 March 1969	28 November 1970
Minister of Justice	Teodor Vasiliu	28 November 1970	28 March 1974
Minister of Armed Forces (since 1 November 1972, Minister of National Defense)	Ion Ioniță	13 March 1969	28 March 1974
Minister of Finance	Virgil Pârvu	13 March 1969	19 August 1969
Minister of Finance	Florea Dumitrescu	19 August 1969	28 March 1974
Minister of Metallurgical Industry	Neculai Agachi	13 March 1969	28 March 1974
Minister of Chemical Industry	Alexandru Boabă	13 March 1969	17 September 1970
Minister of Chemical Industry	Mihail Florescu	17 September 1970	28 March 1974
Minister of Petroleum	Nicolae Toader	13 March 1969	17 September 1970
Minister of Petroleum	Alexandru Boabă	17 September 1970	1 April 1971
Minister of Mines (on 18 March 1970 the Ministry of Mines changed its name to the Ministry of Mining Industry and Geology)	Bujor Almășan	13 March 1969	1 April 1971
Minister of Mines, Petroleum and Geology	Bujor Almășan	1 April 1971	28 March 1974
Minister of Electric Energy	Octavian Groza	13 March 1969	18 December 1972
Minister of Electric Energy	Constantin Băbălău	18 December 1972	28 March 1974
Minister of Construction	Dumitru Mosora	13 March 1969	11 October 1969
Minister of Construction Materials Industry	Dumitru Mosora	11 October 1969	28 November 1970
Minister of Construction Materials Industry	Traian Ispas	28 November 1970	4 October 1971
Minister of Forest Economy and Building Materials	Vasile Patilineț	25 January 1972	28 March 1974
Minister of Construction for the Chemical Industry and Refineries	Matei Ghigiu	13 March 1969	11 October 1969
Minister of Industrial Construction	Matei Ghigiu	11 October 1969	28 March 1974
Minister of Machine Building	Ioan Avram	13 March 1969	1 November 1972
Minister of Heavy Machinery Industry (established on 1 November 1972)	Ioan Avram	1 November 1972	28 March 1974
Minister of Machine Tool Building and Electrical Engineering (established on 1 November 1972)	Gheorghe Boldur	1 November 1972	10 May 1973
Minister of Machine Tool Building and Electrical Engineering (established on 1 November 1972)	Virgil Octavian	10 May 1973	28 March 1974
Minister of Light Industry	Ion Crăciun	13 March 1969	28 March 1974
Minister of Agriculture and Forestry (on 26 January 1971 the Ministry of Agriculture and Forestry changed its name to the Ministry of Agriculture, Food Industry, Forestry and Waters)	Angelo Miculescu	18 November 1969	26 January 1971
Minister of Agriculture and Forestry (on 26 January 1971 the Ministry of Agriculture and Forestry changed its name to the Ministry of Agriculture, Food Industry, Forestry and Waters)	Iosif Banc	26 January 1971	24 April 1972
Minister of Agriculture and Forestry (on 26 January 1971 the Ministry of Agriculture and Forestry changed its name to the Ministry of Agriculture, Food Industry, Forestry and Waters)	Angelo Miculescu	24 April 1972	28 March 1974
Minister of Forest Economy (since 11 October 1969, Minister of the Wood Industry)	Mihai Suder	13 March 1969	25 January 1972
Minister of Food Industry (on 26 January 1971 the Ministry of Food Industry became the Department of Food Industry, with its head bearing the rank of Minister Secretary of State)	Simion Bughici	13 March 1969	26 June 1969
Minister of Food Industry (on 26 January 1971 the Ministry of Food Industry became the Department of Food Industry, with its head bearing the rank of Minister Secretary of State)	Gheorghe Moldovan	26 June 1969	26 January 1971
Minister of Food Industry (on 26 January 1971 the Ministry of Food Industry became the Department of Food Industry, with its head bearing the rank of Minister Secretary of State)	Ion Moldovan	26 January 1971	28 March 1974
Minister of Internal Trade	Nicolae Bozdog	13 March 1969	13 October 1972
Minister of Internal Trade	Virgil Trofin	13 October 1972	28 March 1974
Minister of Foreign Trade	Gheorghe Cioară	13 March 1969	30 April 1969
Minister of Foreign Trade	Cornel Burtică	30 April 1969	28 February 1972
Minister of Foreign Trade	Ion Pățan	28 February 1972	28 March 1974
Minister of Technical and Material Supply and Control of Fixed Assets Management (established on 16 September 1971)	Mihai Marinescu	16 September 1971	13 October 1972
Minister of Technical and Material Supply and Control of Fixed Assets Management (established on 16 September 1971)	Maxim Berghianu	13 October 1972	28 March 1974
Minister of Railways	Florian Dănălache	13 March 1969	19 August 1969
Minister of Road, Naval and Air Transport	Ion Baicu (inginer)	13 March 1969	19 August 1969
Minister of Transport (since 1 April 1971, Minister of Transport and Telecommunications)	Pavel Ștefan	19 August 1969	11 February 1971
Minister of Transport (since 1 April 1971, Minister of Transport and Telecommunications)	Florian Dănălache	11 February 1971	13 October 1972
Minister of Transport (since 1 April 1971, Minister of Transport and Telecommunications)	Emil Drăgănescu	13 October 1972	28 March 1974
Minister of Posts and Telecommunications	Mihai Bălănescu	13 March 1969	1 April 1971
Minister of Tourism (established on 25 December 1970)	Ion Cosma	25 December 1970	28 March 1974
Minister of Health	Aurel Moga (medic)	13 March 1969	5 July 1969
Minister of Health	Dan Enăchescu	5 July 1969	24 April 1972
Minister of Health	Theodor Burghele	24 April 1972	28 March 1974
Minister of Labor	Petre Lupu (politician)	13 March 1969	28 March 1974
Minister for Youth Affairs (as First Secretary of the C.C. of the U.T.C.)	Ion Iliescu	13 March 1969	17 March 1971
Minister for Youth Affairs (as First Secretary of the C.C. of the U.T.C.)	Dan Marțian	17 March 1971	23 October 1972
Minister for Youth Affairs (as First Secretary of the C.C. of the U.T.C.)	Ion Traian Ștefănescu	23 October 1972	28 March 1974
Minister of Teaching (since 17 November 1971, Minister of Education and Teaching)	Ștefan Bălan	13 March 1969	19 August 1969
Minister of Teaching (since 17 November 1971, Minister of Education and Teaching)	Miron Constantinescu	19 August 1969	25 November 1970
Minister of Teaching (since 17 November 1971, Minister of Education and Teaching)	Mircea Malița	25 November 1970	13 October 1972
Minister of Teaching (since 17 November 1971, Minister of Education and Teaching)	Paul Niculescu-Mizil	13 October 1972	28 March 1974

== Ministry-level Committees ==
Portfolio	Minister	Took office	Left office
President of the State Planning Committee	Maxim Berghianu	13 March 1969	13 October 1972
President of the State Planning Committee	Manea Mănescu	13 October 1972	28 March 1974
President of the Superior Council of Agriculture (council disbanded on 22 October 1969)	Nicolae Giosan	13 March 1969	22 October 1969
President of the State Security Council	Ion Stănescu	13 March 1969	24 April 1972
Minister Secretary of State at the Ministry of Forestry Economy and Construction Materials	Mihai Suder	25 January 1972	28 March 1974
Minister Secretary of State at the Ministry of Chemical Industry	Ilie Câșu	30 December 1972	28 March 1974
Minister Secretary of State at the Ministry of Heavy Machinery Construction	Traian Dudaș	18 December 1972	28 March 1974
Minister Secretary of State at the Ministry of Foreign Trade	Nicolae M. Nicolae	28 February 1972	28 March 1974
Minister Secretary of State at the Ministry of Agriculture, Food Industry, Forestry and Waters	Angelo Miculescu	26 January 1971	24 April 1972
Minister Secretary of State at the Ministry of Agriculture, Food Industry, Forestry and Waters	Aldea Militaru	30 December 1972	28 March 1974
First Vice President of the Economic Council	Mihai Marinescu (politician)	13 October 1972	28 March 1974
President of the State Committee for Culture and Arts (since 16 September 1971, President of the Council of Socialist Culture and Education)	Pompiliu Macovei	13 March 1969	15 July 1971
President of the State Committee for Culture and Arts (since 16 September 1971, President of the Council of Socialist Culture and Education)	Dumitru Popescu	15 July 1971	28 March 1974
President of the National Council of Scientific Research	Nicolae Murguleț	13 March 1969	19 August 1969
President of the National Council of Scientific Research	Gheorghe Buzdugan (inginer)	19 August 1969	17 September 1970
President of the National Council of Scientific Research	Gheorghe Cioară	17 September 1970	28 March 1974
First Vice-President of the National Council of Scientific Research (with the rank of Minister Secretary of State)	Octavian Groza	18 December 1972	28 March 1974
President of the State Committee for Local Government Issues	Petre Blajovici	13 March 1969	28 March 1974
First Vice-President of the State Planning Committee (with the rank of Minister Secretary of State)	Gheorghe Cioară	30 April 1969	15 May 1972
First Vice-President of the State Planning Committee (with the rank of Minister Secretary of State)	Emilian Dobrescu	15 May 1972	18 December 1972
First Vice-President of the State Planning Committee (with the rank of Minister Secretary of State)	Nicolae Mihai	18 December 1972	28 March 1974
President of the Prices Committee	Gheorghe Gaston Marin	13 March 1969	28 March 1974
President of the National Water Council	Florin Ioan Iorgulescu	26 January 1971	28 March 1974
President of the State Committee for Nuclear Energy	Ioan Ursu	31 December 1969	28 March 1974
President of the Central Council of the General Union of Trade Unions of Romania	Virgil Trofin	17 November 1971	28 March 1974
Advisor to the State Council	Horia Hulubei	31 December 1969	28 March 1974
State Inspector General at the State General Inspectorate for Product Quality Control	Dumitru Niculescu	21 July 1970	28 March 1974

Preceded by Fourth Maurer cabinet	Cabinet of Romania; 13 March 1969 - 28 March 1974	Succeeded by First Mănescu cabinet
