= Fourth Maurer cabinet =

Romanian government

- 106th Cabinet of Romania

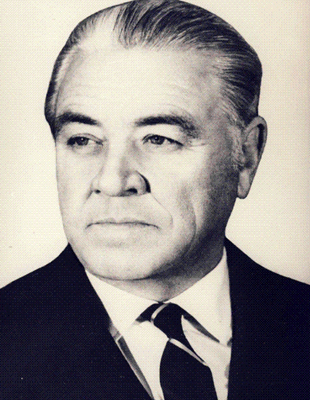
- Date formed: 9 December 1967
- Date dissolved: 13 March 1969

People and organisations
- President of the State Council: Nicolae Ceaușescu
- President of the Council of Ministers: Ion Gheorghe Maurer (PCR)
- First Vice President of the Council of Ministers: Ilie Verdeț (PCR)
- No. of ministers: 41
- Total no. of members: 45
- Member party: PCR
- Status in legislature: One-party state

History
- Election: 1965
- Legislature term: 5th Great National Assembly
- Predecessor: Maurer III
- Successor: Maurer V

The fourth Maurer cabinet was the government of Romania from 9 December 1967 to 13 March 1969.

== Changes in the government ==
- December 11, 1967 - Also had ministerial rank and participated in the meetings of the Council of Ministers: the president of the Central Council of the General Union of Trade Unions and the president of the Central Council of the National Union of Agricultural Production Cooperatives.

== Ministries ==
The ministers of the cabinet were as follows:

Portfolio	Minister	Took office	Left office
President of the Council of Ministers	Ion Gheorghe Maurer	9 December 1967	13 March 1969
First Vice President of the Council of Ministers	Ilie Verdeț	9 December 1967	13 March 1969
Vice President of the Council of Ministers	Alexandru Bârlădeanu	9 December 1967	28 January 1969
Vice President of the Council of Ministers	Alexandru Drăghici	9 December 1967	25 May 1968
Vice President of the Council of Ministers	János Fazekas	9 December 1967	13 March 1969
Vice President of the Council of Ministers	Gheorghe Gaston Marin	9 December 1967	13 March 1969
Vice President of the Council of Ministers	Iosif Banc	9 December 1967	13 March 1969
Vice President of the Council of Ministers	Gheorghe (Gogu) Rădulescu	9 December 1967	13 March 1969
Vice President of the Council of Ministers	Emil Drăgănescu	3 July 1968	13 March 1969
Minister of Interior	Cornel Onescu	9 December 1967	13 March 1969
Minister of Foreign Affairs	Corneliu Mănescu	9 December 1967	13 March 1969
Minister of Justice	Adrian Dimitriu	9 December 1967	13 March 1969
Minister of Armed Forces	Ion Ioniță	9 December 1967	13 March 1969
Minister of Finance	Aurel Vijoli	9 December 1967	16 July 1968
Minister of Finance	Virgil Pârvu	16 July 1968	13 March 1969
Minister of Metallurgical Industry	Ion Marinescu	9 December 1967	13 March 1969
Minister of Chemical Industry	Constantin Scarlat	9 December 1967	13 March 1969
Minister of Petroleum Industry	Alexandru Boabă	9 December 1967	13 March 1969
Minister of Mines	Bujor Almășan	9 December 1967	13 March 1969
Minister of Electric Energy	Emil Drăgănescu	9 December 1967	10 July 1968
Minister of Electric Energy	Octavian Groza	10 July 1968	13 March 1969
Minister of Construction Industry	Dumitru Mosora	9 December 1967	13 March 1969
Minister of Machine Building	Mihai Marinescu (politician)	9 December 1967	13 March 1969
Minister of Construction for the Chemical Industry and Refineries	Matei Ghigiu	9 December 1967	13 March 1969
Minister of Light Industry	Alexandru Sencovici	9 December 1967	13 March 1969
Minister of Forest Economy	Mihai Suder	9 December 1967	13 March 1969
Minister of Food Industry	Bucur Șchiopu	9 December 1967	13 March 1969
Minister of Internal Trade	Mihail Levente	9 December 1967	29 March 1968
Minister of Internal Trade	Ion Pățan	29 March 1968	13 March 1969
Minister of Foreign Trade	Gheorghe Cioară	9 December 1967	13 March 1969
Minister of Railways	Florian Dănălache	9 December 1967	13 March 1969
Minister of Road, Naval and Air Transport	Ion Baicu (inginer)	9 December 1967	13 March 1969
Minister of Posts and Telecommunications	Mihai Bălănescu	9 December 1967	13 March 1969
Minister of Health	Aurel Moga (medic)	9 December 1967	13 March 1969
Minister of Labor	Petre Blajovici	9 December 1967	13 March 1969
Minister for Youth Affairs (as First Secretary of the C.C. of the U.T.C.)	Ion Iliescu	11 December 1967	13 March 1969
Minister of Teaching	Ștefan Bălan	9 December 1967	13 March 1969

== Ministry-level Committees ==
Portfolio	Minister	Took office	Left office
President of the State Planning Committee	Maxim Berghianu	9 December 1967	13 March 1969
President of the Superior Council of Agriculture	Nicolae Giosan	9 December 1967	13 March 1969
President of the State Security Council	Ion Stănescu	7 May 1968	13 March 1969
President of the State Committee for Culture and Arts	Pompiliu Macovei	9 December 1967	13 March 1969
President of the National Council of Scientific Research	Alexandru Bârlădeanu	9 December 1967	5 December 1968
President of the National Council of Scientific Research	Nicolae Murguleț	5 December 1968	13 March 1969
President of the State Committee for Local Government Issues	Mihai Gere	9 December 1967	13 March 1969
President of the State Committee for Organization and Wage Issues	Petre Lupu (politician)	9 December 1967	13 March 1969
President of the Economic Council	Manea Mănescu	9 December 1967	13 March 1969
President of the Prices Committee	Roman Moldovan	9 December 1967	13 March 1969

Preceded by Third Maurer cabinet	Cabinet of Romania; 9 December 1967 - 13 March 1969	Succeeded by Fifth Maurer cabinet
