= Second Maurer cabinet =

Romanian government

- 102st Cabinet of Romania

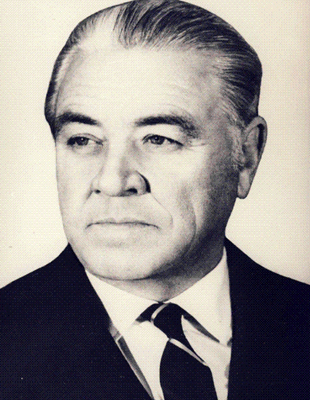
- Date formed: 18 March 1965
- Date dissolved: 21 August 1965

People and organisations
- President of the State Council: Chivu Stoica
- President of the Council of Ministers: Ion Gheorghe Maurer (PCR)
- First Vice President of the Council of Ministers: Emil Bodnăraș (PCR); Gheorghe Apostol (PCR); Alexandru Drăghici (PCR); Ilie Verdeț (PCR)
- No. of ministers: 41
- Total no. of members: 32
- Member party: PCR
- Status in legislature: One-party state

History
- Election: 1965
- Legislature term: 5th Great National Assembly
- Predecessor: Maurer I
- Successor: Maurer III

The second Maurer cabinet was the government of Romania from 18 March to 21 August 1965.

== Composition ==
The ministers of the cabinet were as follows:

- President of the Council of Ministers:

- Ion Gheorghe Maurer (18 March – 21 August 1965)

- First Vice President of the Council of Ministers:

- Emil Bodnăraș (18 March – 21 August 1965)
- Gheorghe Apostol (18 March – 21 August 1965)
- Alexandru Drăghici (18 March – 24 July 1965)
- Ilie Verdeț (24 July – 21 August 1965)

- Vice Presidents of the Council of Ministers:

- Alexandru Moghioroș (18 March – 21 August 1965)
- Alexandru Bârlădeanu (18 March – 21 August 1965)
- Gheorghe Gaston Marin (18 March – 21 August 1965)
- Petre Blajovici (4 octombrie 1955 – 19 martie 1957)
- Gheorghe Rădoi (18 March – 21 August 1965)
- Gheorghe (Gogu) Rădulescu (18 March – 21 August 1965)

- Minister of the Interior:

- Alexandru Drăghici (18 March – 24 July 1965)
- Cornel Onescu (24 July – 21 August 1965)

- Minister of Foreign Affairs:

- Corneliu Mănescu (18 March – 21 August 1965)

- Minister of Justice:

- Adrian Dumitriu (18 March – 21 August 1965)

- Minister of National Defense:

- Leontin Sălăjan (18 March – 21 August 1965)

- Minister of Finance:

- Aurel Vijoli (18 March – 21 August 1965)

- Minister of Metallurgical Industry:

- Ion Marinescu (18 March – 21 August 1965)

- Minister of Petroleum and Chemical Industry:

- Mihail Florescu (18 March – 21 August 1965)

- Minister of Mines and Electric Power:

- Bujor Almășan (18 March – 21 August 1965)

- Minister of Construction Industry:

- Dumitru Mosora (18 March – 21 August 1965)

- Minister of Machine Construction:

- Mihai Marinescu (18 March – 21 August 1965)

- Minister of Light Industry:

- Alexandru Sencovici (18 March – 21 August 1965)

- President of the Superior Council of Agriculture (with ministerial rank):

- Mihai Dalea (18 March – 24 July 1965)
- Nicolae Giosan (24 July – 21 August 1965)

- Minister of Forestry Economics:

- Mihai Suder (18 March – 21 August 1965)

- Minister of Food Industry:

- János Fazekas (18 March – 21 August 1965)

- Minister of Internal Commerce:

- Mihail Levente (18 March – 21 August 1965)

- Minister of External Commerce:

- Mihail Petri (18 March – 21 August 1965)

- Minister of Transport and Telecommunications:

- Dumitru Simulescu (18 March – 21 August 1965)

- Minister of Health and Social Provisions:

- Voinea Marinescu (18 March – 21 August 1965)

- Minister of Education:

- Ștefan Bălan (18 March – 21 August 1965)

=== Minister Secretaries of State ===
- President of the State Committee for Culture and Arts (with ministerial rank):

- Constanța Crăciun (18 March – 21 August 1965)

- President of the State Planning Committee (with ministerial rank):

- Gheorghe Gaston Marin (18 March – 21 August 1965)

Preceded by First Maurer cabinet	Cabinet of Romania; 18 March - 21 August 1965	Succeeded by Third Maurer cabinet
