= Sânpetru (disambiguation) =

Sânpetru may refer to:

In Romania:

- Sânpetru, a commune in Brașov County
- Sânpetru de Câmpie, a commune in Mureș County
- Sânpetru Mare, a commune in Timiș County
- Sânpetru, a village in Sântămăria-Orlea commune, Hunedoara County
- Sânpetru Almaşului, a village in Hida commune, Sălaj County
- Sânpetru German, a village in Secusigiu commune, Arad County
- Sânpetru Mic, a village in Variaș commune, Timiș County

== See also ==
- Valea Sânpetrului (disambiguation)
