= Sărmașu =

- Town
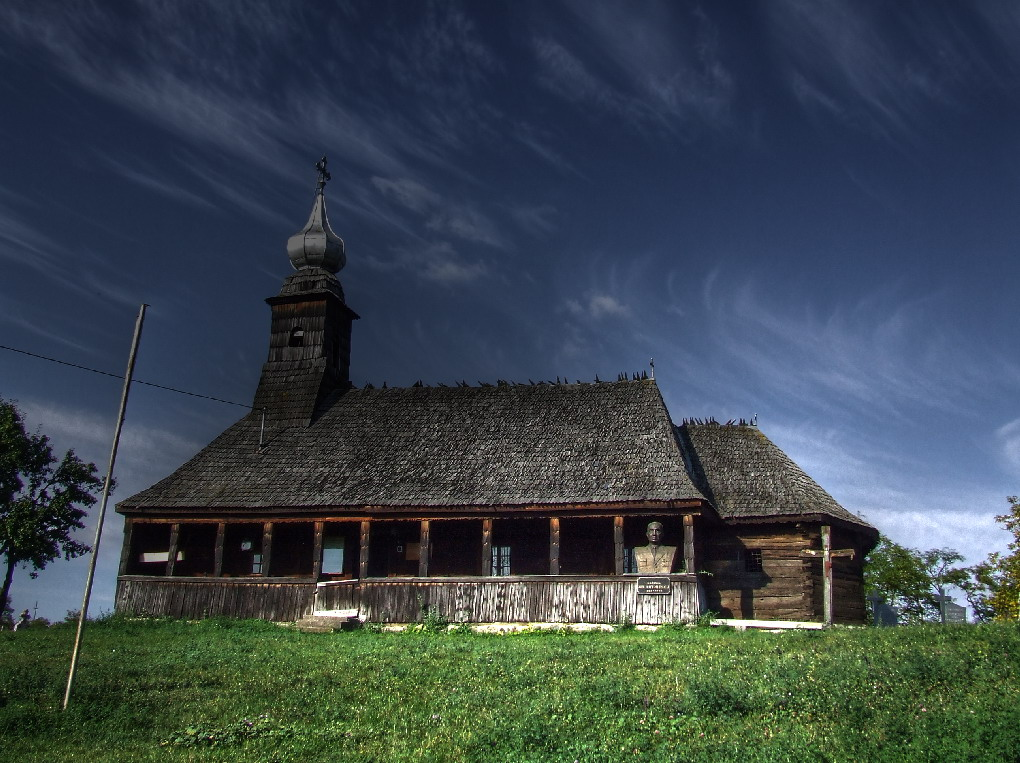
- Wooden church in Sărmașu

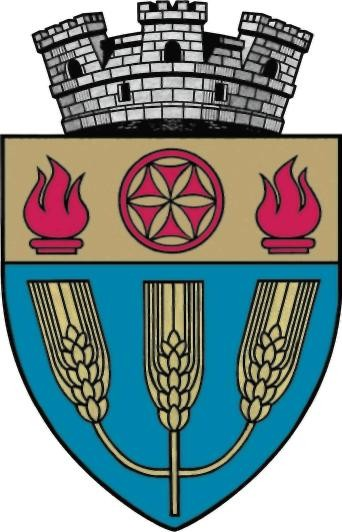
- Coat of arms

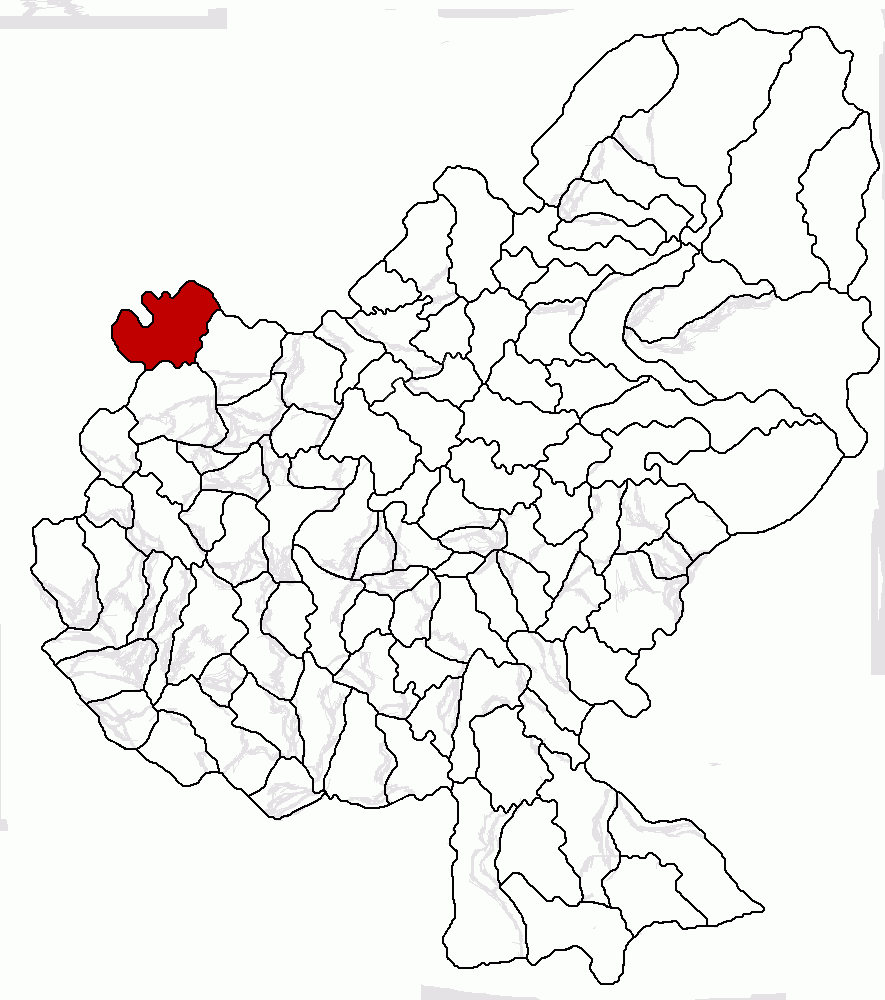
- Location in Mureș County

- Location in Romania
- Coordinates: 46°45′13″N 24°10′0″E
- Country: Romania
- County: Mureș

Government
  - Mayor (2024–2028): Valer Botezan (PSD)
- Area: 61.75 km^{2} (23.84 sq mi)
- Elevation: 347 m (1,138 ft)
- Highest elevation: 500 m (1,600 ft)
- Population (2021-12-01): 6,186
  - Density: 100.2/km^{2} (259.5/sq mi)
- Time zone: UTC+02:00 (EET)
  - Summer (DST): UTC+03:00 (EEST)
- Postal code: 547515
- Area code: (+40) 02 65
- Vehicle reg.: MS
- Website: orasulsarmasu.ro

Sărmașu (Hungarian: Nagysármás; Hungarian pronunciation: [ˈnɒɟʃaːrmaːʃ]) is a town in Mureș County, central Transylvania, Romania. It administers seven villages: Balda (Báld), Larga (Lárga), Moruț (Marocháza), Sărmășel (Kissármás), Sărmășel-Gară (Bánffytanya), Titiana (Titiána), and Vișinelu (Csehtelke).

== Geography ==
The town lies in the Transylvanian Plain, at an altitude of 347 m (1,138 ft), on the banks of the rivers Pârâul de Câmpie and Frata. It is located in the western part of Mureș County, 47 km (29 mi) northwest of the county seat, Târgu Mureș, on the border with Cluj and Bistrița-Năsăud counties.

Sărmașu is bordered to the north by Budești, Bistrița-Năsăud; to the east by Sânpetru de Câmpie and to the southeast by Miheșu de Câmpie (both in Mureș County); to the west by Cămărașu and to the northwest by Mociu (both in Cluj County).

Sărmășel-Gară village is crossed by national road DN16, which connects it to Cluj-Napoca, 53 km (33 mi) to the west, and to Reghin, 48 km (30 mi) to the east. The town has two train stations (Sărmășag and Sărmășel), both serving the CFR Line 405, which starts in Deda, Mureș and ends in Ocna Mureș, Alba County.

== History ==
The town is the site of the Sărmașu massacre, which occurred between 5 September and 10 October 1944, when Sărmașu came under the occupation of the Nazi-aligned Hungarian troops. During this period, Hungarian gendarmes and members of the Hungarian National Guard killed 126 local Jews (out of 142 who were living in the city at the time), as well as 39 Romanians, the latter primarily prisoners of war captured during the Battle of Turda.

== Demographics ==
Historical population
Year	Pop.	±%
1850	2,274	—
1880	2,079	−8.6%
1900	3,661	+76.1%
1910	4,390	+19.9%
1930	5,918	+34.8%
1956	8,204	+38.6%
1977	8,439	+2.9%
1992	7,206	−14.6%
2002	7,493	+4.0%
2011	6,833	−8.8%
2021	6,186	−9.5%
Source: Census data

At the 2021 census, Sărmașu had a population of 6,186, of which 63.32% were Romanians, 17.73% Hungarians, and 12.38% Roma. According to the 2011 census, the town had 6,833 inhabitants, divided among the following ethnic groups: Romanians (67.24%), Hungarians (22.36%), and Roma (10.2%).

== The Sărmașel gas field ==
On the present-day territory of Romania, the first natural gas deposit was discovered in 1909, in Sărmășel (then in Austria-Hungary). The Sărmașel gas field was developed by Romgaz. The first gas production was used to power the steam boilers in Sărmășel and the gas lighting of the alleys in Bazna resort. In 1914 the first gas pipe was finished, spanning from Sărmășel to Turda and on to Ocna Mureș, with a length of 55 kilometres (34 miles) and 153 millimetres (6 in) diameter; in 1916, Turda became the first city in Europe to have public street lights fueled by natural gas. In 1927 the first natural gas compression station in Europe was built in Sărmășel.

== Natives ==
- Alin Chibulcutean (born 1978), football player
- Anton Doboș (born 1965), football player
- Ovidiu Iuliu Moldovan (1942–2008), actor

== See also ==
- List of Hungarian exonyms (Mureș County)
