= Third Maurer cabinet =

Romanian government

- 103st Cabinet of Romania

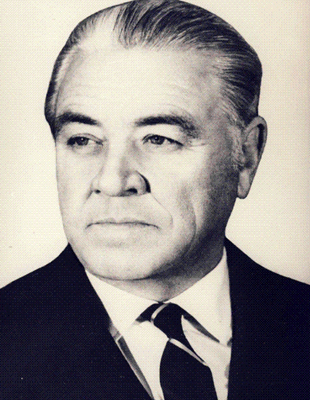
- Date formed: 21 August 1965
- Date dissolved: 9 December 1967

People and organisations
- President of the State Council: Chivu Stoica
- President of the Council of Ministers: Ion Gheorghe Maurer (PCR)
- First Vice President of the Council of Ministers: Emil Bodnăraș (PCR); Gheorghe Apostol (PCR); Ilie Verdeț (PCR); Alexandru Bârlădeanu (PCR)
- No. of ministers: 41
- Total no. of members: 48
- Member party: PCR
- Status in legislature: One-party state

History
- Election: 1965
- Legislature term: 5th Great National Assembly
- Predecessor: Maurer II
- Successor: Maurer IV

The third Maurer cabinet was the government of Romania from 21 August 1965 to 9 December 1967.

== Composition ==
The ministers of the cabinet were as follows:

- President of the Council of Ministers:

Ion Gheorghe Maurer (21 August 1965 – 9 December 1967)

- First Vice President of the Council of Ministers:

- Emil Bodnăraș (21 August 1965 – 9 December 1967)
- Gheorghe Apostol (21 August 1965 – 3 January 1967)
- Ilie Verdeț (3 January – 9 December 1967)
- Alexandru Bârlădeanu (21 August 1965 – 9 December 1967)

- Vice Presidents of the Council of Ministers:

- Alexandru Moghioroș (21 August 1965 – 9 December 1967)
- János Fazekas (21 August 1965 – 9 December 1967)
- Gheorghe Gaston Marin (21 August 1965 – 9 December 1967)
- Petre Blajovici (21 August 1965 – 9 December 1967)
- Iosif Banc (21 August 1965 – 9 December 1967)
- Gheorghe (Gogu) Rădulescu (21 August 1965 – 9 December 1967)
- Ilie Verdeț (21 August 1965 – 3 January 1967)
- Roman Moldovan (23 December 1965 – 9 December 1967)

- Minister of the Interior:

- Cornel Onescu (21 August 1965 – 9 December 1967)

- Minister of Foreign Affairs:

- Corneliu Mănescu (21 August 1965 – 9 December 1967)

- Minister of Justice:

- Adrian Dumitriu (21 August 1965 – 9 December 1967)

- Minister of National Defense

- Leontin Sălăjan (21 August 1965 – 30 August 1966)
- Ion Ioniță (30 August 1966 – 9 December 1967)

- President of the State Planning Committee (with ministerial rank):

- Gheorghe Gaston Marin (21 August – 23 December 1965)
- Maxim Berghianu (23 December 1965 – 9 December 1967)

- Minister of Finance:

- Aurel Vijoli (21 August 1965 – 9 December 1967)

- Minister of Metallurgical Industry:

- Ion Marinescu (21 August 1965 – 9 December 1967)

- Minister of Chemistry and Chemical Industry:

- Mihail Florescu (21 August - 25 October 1965)
- Constantin Scarlat (25 October 1965 - 9 December 1967)

- Minister of Petroleum

- Alexandru Boabă (21 August 1965 – 9 December 1967)

- Minister of Mines

- Bujor Almășan (21 August 1965 – 9 December 1967)

- Minister of Electric Power:

- Emil Drăgănescu (21 August 1965 – 9 December 1967)

- Minister of Construction Industry:

- Dumitru Mosora (21 August 1965 – 9 December 1967)

- Minister of Machine Construction:

- Mihai Marinescu (politician) (21 August 1965 – 9 December 1967)

- Minister of Construction for the Chemical Industry and Refineries:

- Matei Ghigiu (25 December 1966 – 9 December 1967)

- Minister of Light Industry:

- Alexandru Sencovici (21 August 1965 – 9 December 1967)

- President of the Superior Council of Agriculture (with ministerial rank):

- Nicolae Giosan (21 August 1965 – 9 December 1967)

- Minister of Forestry Economics:

- Mihai Suder (21 August 1965 – 9 December 1967)

- Minister of Food Industry:

- Bucur Șchiopu (21 August 1965 – 9 December 1967)

- Minister of Internal Commerce:

- Mihail Levente (21 August 1965 – 9 December 1967)

- Minister of External Commerce:

- Gheorghe Cioară (21 August 1965 – 9 December 1967)

- Minister of Transport and Telecommunications:

- Dumitru Simulescu (21 August – 19 December 1965)

- Minister of Railways:

- Dumitru Simulescu (19 December 1965 – 1 April 1966)
- Florian Dănălache (1 April 1966 – 9 December 1967)

- Minister of Road, Naval and Air Transport:

- Ion Baicu (inginer) (19 December 1965 – 9 December 1967)

- Minister of Posts and Telecommunications:

- Mihai Bălănescu (19 December 1965 – 9 December 1967)

- Minister of Health and Social Provisions:

- Voinea Marinescu (21 August 1965 – 28 August 1966)
- Aurel Moga (medic) (28 August 1966 – 9 December 1967)

- Minister of Education:

- Ștefan Bălan (21 August 1965 – 9 December 1967)

=== Minister Secretaries of State ===
- President of the State Committee for Culture and Arts (with ministerial rank):

- Pompiliu Macovei (21 August 1965 – 9 December 1967)

- President of the National Council of Scientific Research (with ministerial rank):

- Roman Moldovan (23 December 1965 – 9 December 1967)

- President of the State Committee for Guidance and Control of Local Organizations of State Administration (with ministerial rank):

- Cornel Fulger (30 December 1965 – 9 December 1967)

- President of the State Committee for Occupational Safety (with ministerial rank):

- Dumitru Petrescu (30 December 1965 – 9 December 1967)

- Chairman of the State Committee for Labor and Wages Issues (with ministerial rank):

- Simion Țaigăr (21 August 1965 – 28 September 1966)
- Petre Lupu (politician) (28 September 1966 – 9 December 1967)

- President of the Board of the National Tourism Office (ONT) (with ministerial rank):

- Nicolae Bozdog (6 April – 9 December 1967)

- Chairman of the State Water Committee (with ministerial rank):

- Gheorghe Hossu (6 April – 9 December 1967)

| Preceded by Second Maurer cabinet | Cabinet of Romania; 21 August 1965 - 9 December 1967 | Succeeded by Fourth Maurer cabinet |
