= Șes (Pârâul de Câmpie) =

- Location within Romania

Location
- Country: Romania
- Counties: Bistrița-Năsăud, Mureș
- Communes: Miceștii de Câmpie, Silivașu de Câmpie, Sânpetru de Câmpie, Pogăceaua, Miheșu de Câmpie

Physical characteristics
- Mouth: Pârâul de Câmpie
  - coordinates: 46.655°N 24.178°E
- Length: 31 km (19 mi)
- Basin size: 181 km^{2} (70 sq mi)

Basin features
- Progression: Pârâul de Câmpie→ Mureș→ Tisza→ Danube→ Black Sea
- Tributaries
  - left: Bologa

The Șes is a left tributary of the river Pârâul de Câmpie in Romania. It discharges into the Pârâul de Câmpie in Bujor. Its length is 31 km (19 mi) and its basin size is 181 km^{2} (70 sq mi).
