= Sărmășel mine =

Salt mine in Mureș County, Romania

Sărmăşel mine
- Location within Romania
- Location: Sărmașu, Mureș County, Romania; 46°45′38.23″N 24°10′43.86″E
- Products: Sodium chloride
- Company: Salrom

The Sărmăşel mine is a large salt mine located in central Romania in Mureș County, close to Sărmașu. Sărmășel represents one of the largest salt reserves in Romania having estimated reserves of 100 billion tonnes of NaCl.
