= Cămărașu =

- Commune
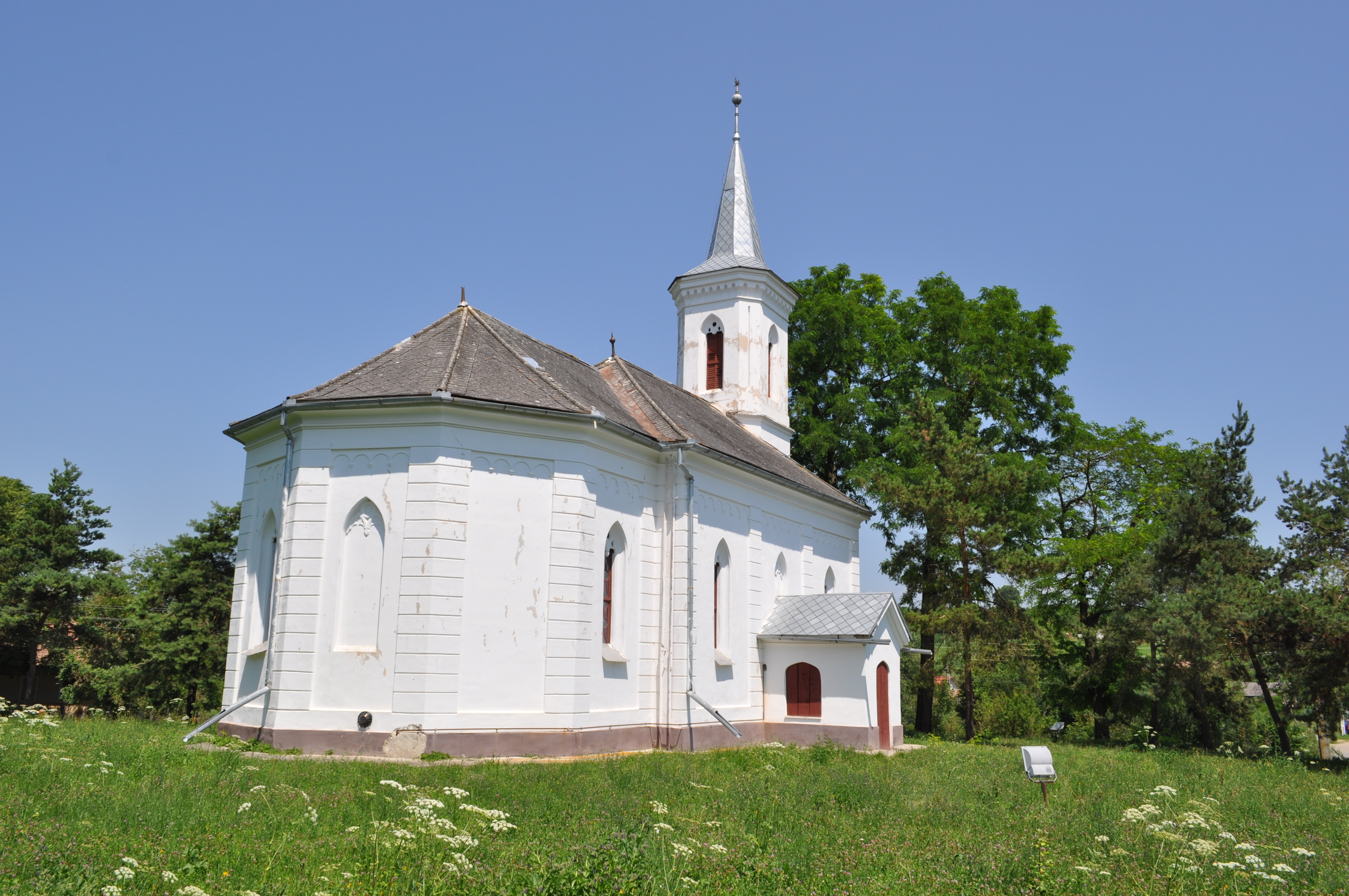
- Reformed church în Cămărașu village

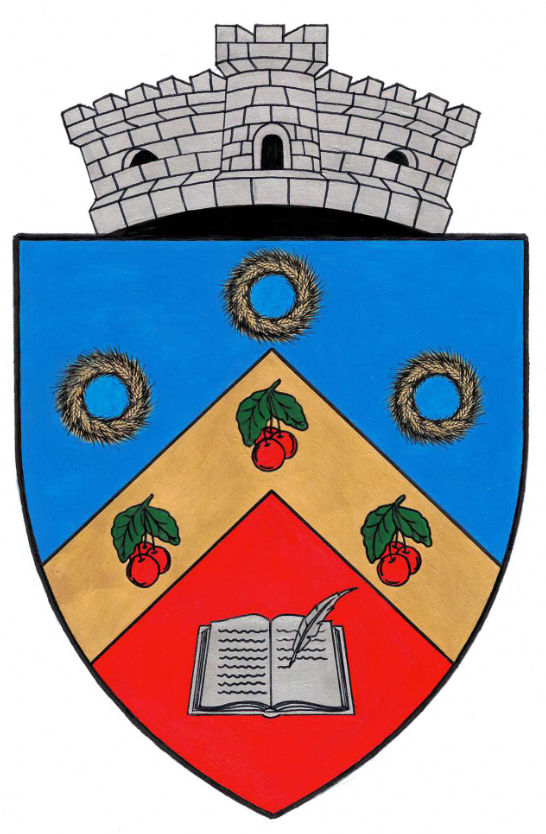
- Coat of arms

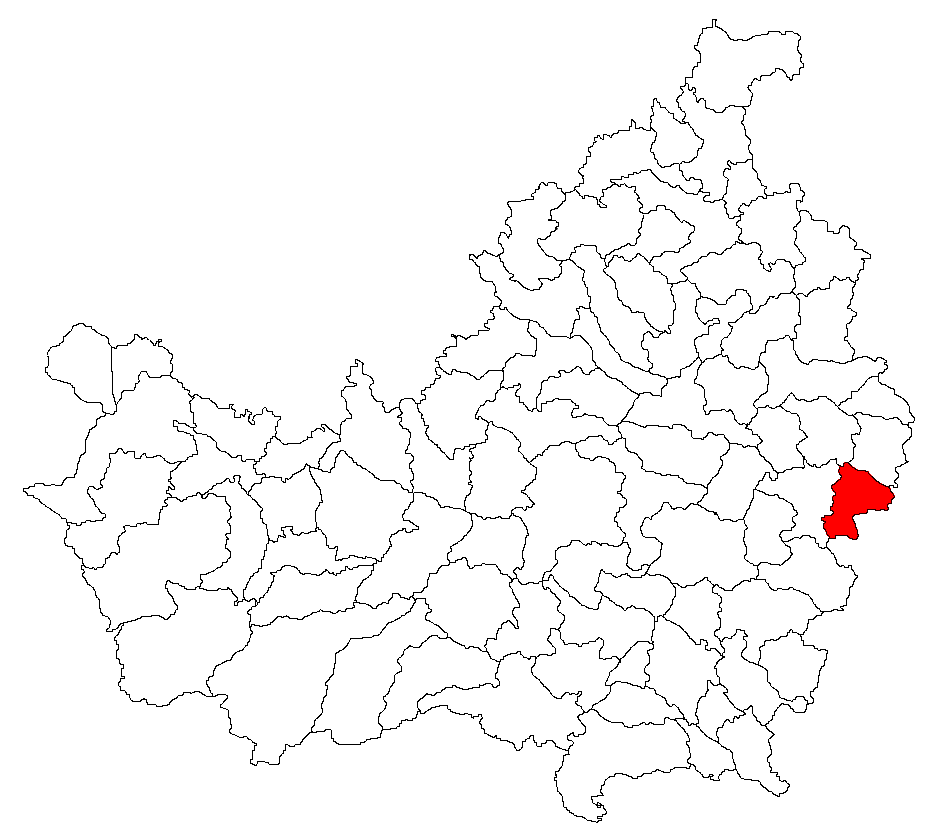
- Location in Cluj County

- Location in Romania
- Coordinates: 46°47′35″N 24°7′45″E
- Country: Romania
- County: Cluj
- Established: 1322
- Subdivisions: Cămărașu, Năoiu, Sâmboleni

Government
  - Mayor (2020–2024): Iancu Marcel Mocean (Ind.)
- Area: 51 km^{2} (20 sq mi)
- Elevation: 360 m (1,180 ft)
- Population (2021-12-01): 2,591
  - Density: 51/km^{2} (130/sq mi)
- Time zone: UTC+02:00 (EET)
  - Summer (DST): UTC+03:00 (EEST)
- Postal code: 407140
- Area code: +(40) x64
- Vehicle reg.: CJ
- Website: www.primariacamarasu.ro

Cămărașu (Hungarian: Pusztakamarás; German: Kammerischdorf) is a commune in Cluj County, Transylvania, Romania. It is composed of three villages: Cămărașu, Năoiu (Novoly), and Sâmboleni (Mezőszombattelke).

== Geography ==
The commune is situated on the Transylvanian Plateau, at an altitude of 360 m (1,180 ft), on the banks of the rivers Fizeș and Frata. It is located in the eastern part of Cluj County, 45 km (28 mi) from the county seat, Cluj-Napoca, on the border with Bistrița-Năsăud and Mureș counties. Its neighbors are: Budești commune to the east, the town of Sărmașu to the east and south, Mociu commune to the west, and Cătina commune to the north.

Cămărașu is crossed by national road DN16, which starts in Cluj-Napoca and ends in Reghin, 56 km (35 mi) to the east.

== Demographics ==
Historical population
Year	Pop.	±%
1850	1,983	—
1880	1,773	−10.6%
1900	2,492	+40.6%
1910	2,658	+6.7%
1920	2,495	−6.1%
1930	3,028	+21.4%
1941	3,361	+11.0%
1956	4,145	+23.3%
1966	4,149	+0.1%
1977	3,729	−10.1%
1992	2,705	−27.5%
2002	2,782	+2.8%
2011	2,655	−4.6%
2021	2,591	−2.4%
Source: Census data

According to the census in 2002, there was a population of 2,782, of whom 77.74% were ethnic Romanians, 15.09% ethnic Roma, and 7.15% ethnic Hungarians. At the 2021 census, Cămărașu had a population of 2,591; of those, 65.03% were Romanians, 23.04% Roma, and 3.98% Hungarians.

== Natives ==
- András Sütő (1927–2006), writer
