= Valea Sânpetrului =

Valea Sânpetrului may refer to:

In Romania:

- Valea Sânpetrului, a village in Grebenișu de Câmpie commune, Mureș County
- Valea Sânpetrului, a village in Pogăceaua commune, Mureș County
