= András Sütő =

Hungarian writer and politician (1927–2006)

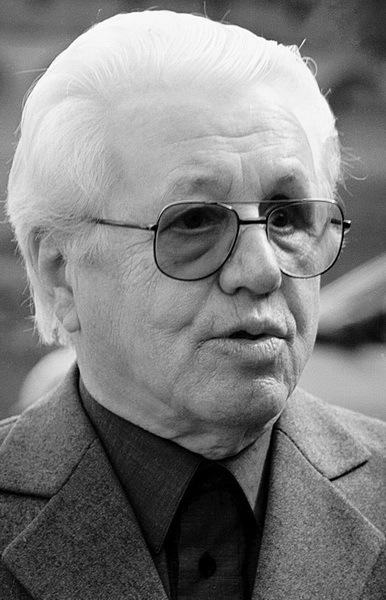
- Born: 17 June 1927; Cămărașu, Kingdom of Romania
- Died: 30 September 2006 (aged 79) (skin cancer); Budapest, Hungarian Republic
- Citizenship: Kingdom of Romania; Romanian People's Republic; Socialist Republic of Romania; Romania
- Occupations: writer; playwright; journalist; politician
- Writing career
- Language: Hungarian
- Notable works: Anyám könnyű álmot ígér, Pompás Gedeon

András Sütő (17 June 1927 – 30 September 2006) was an ethnic Hungarian journalist, writer, playwright and politician from Romania, one of the leading writers in the Hungarian language in the 20th century.

== Early life and education ==
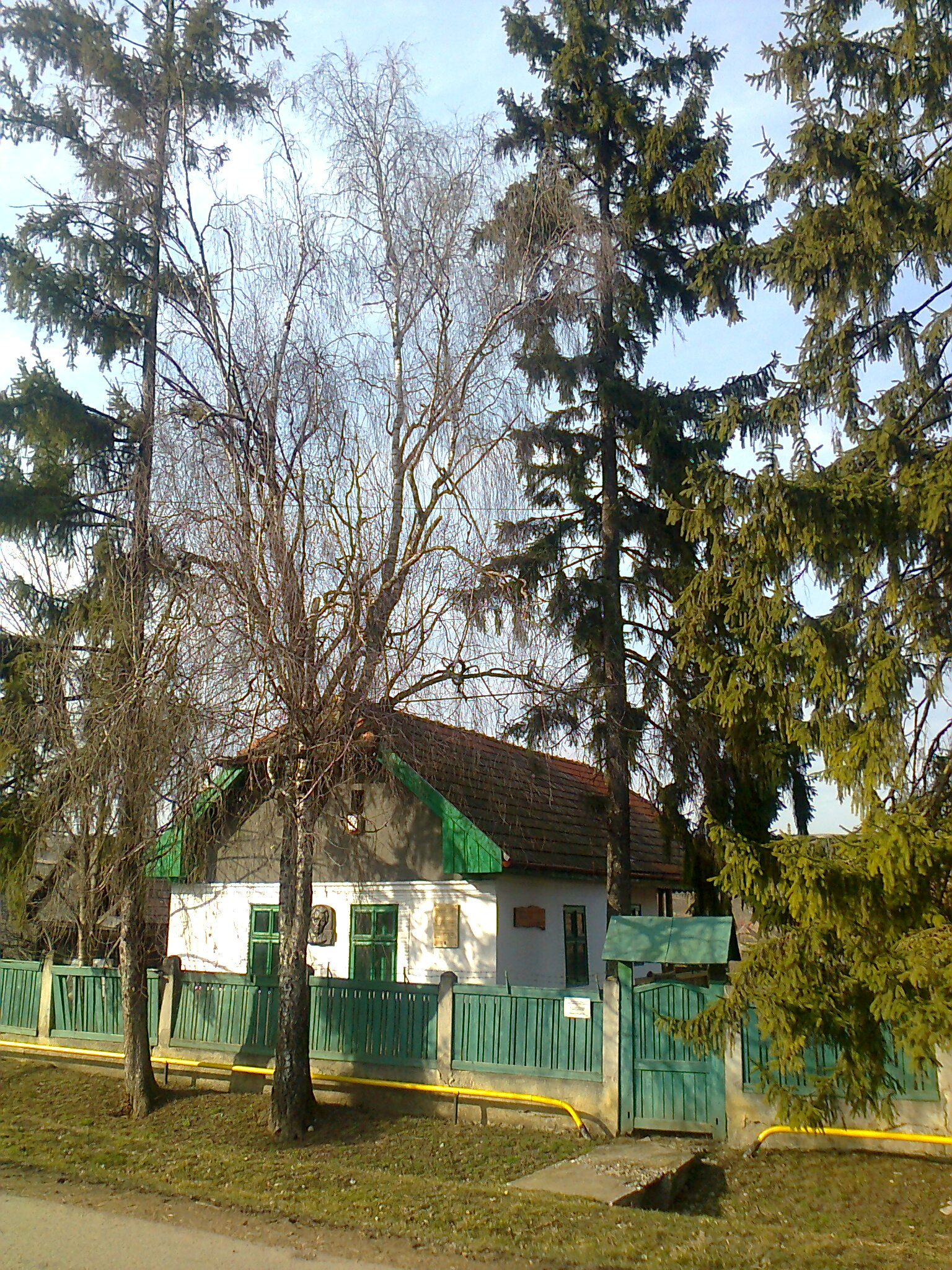
András Sütő Memorial House in Cămărașu

Sütő was born into a poor peasant family in Cămărașu (Hungarian: Pusztakamarás), Cluj County, in the Transylvania region of Romania. He received his primary and secondary school education in the Reformed College of Aiud and in the Reformed gymnasium in Cluj. After secondary school, he studied stage directing at the Szentgyörgyi István College of Dramatic Arts in Cluj.

== Career ==
=== Journalism ===
Sütő quit college to become the editor in chief of the Falvak Népe weekly. He moved to Bucharest in 1951 because the editorial office was relocated there. Sütő could not identify himself with the political environment of the 1950s in the capital and returned in 1954 to Târgu Mureș, in Transylvania, where he edited Igaz Szó, a literary magazine. He held this post till 1957, after which he edited Uj Élet, an illustrated magazine, until 1989.

=== Literature ===
Sütő's first work (A Letter to a Romanian Friend) was published by the Hungarian-language Világosság journal in Cluj, when he was 18. His writing career ranged across genres, with short stories (Félrejáró Salamon, 1955), satire (Pompás Gedeon, 1967), historical drama (Egy lócsiszár virágvasárnapja, 1974; Csillag a máglyán, 1974; Szuzai menyegzo, 1981), and myth and folklore (Káin és Abel, 1977; Advent a Hargitán, 1987). The dramas, in particular, probed the duty of the individual, confronted by arbitrary authority, to preserve his dignity and identity even at the cost of his life.

He served as vice-president of the Writers' Association of Romania between 1974 and 1982.

From 1980, aiming to curb his dissent against the Nicolae Ceaușescu regime's repression of Romania's Hungarian minorities, András Sütő's works were banned from publication and presentation. Consequently, between 1980 and 1989 he could publish only in Hungary. During this period, he and his family were constantly harassed by the authorities and the Securitate.

=== Politics ===
A committed Communist, Sütő was a member of the Great National Assembly, the parliament of Communist Romania, between 1965 and 1977. He was also an alternate member of the Executive Committee of the Central Committee of the Romanian Communist Party from 1969 to 1984. But his observations of the fate of the indigenous Romanian and Hungarian villagers in Transylvania under forced collectivisation in the 1950s and his discontent with the increasing centralisation of political power brought him into disfavour from the Ceaușescu government. Increasingly he also opposed the regime's pressure to "homogenise" the various nationalities in the country, such as restrictions against the use of the Hungarian language.

By the time of Ceaușescu's removal from power during the Romanian Revolution of 1989, Sütő was a well-known public figure, respected for his support of the rights of the Hungarian people in Romania.

=== Awards ===
In 1979, Sütő was awarded the Herder Prize.

He also received the Gábor Bethlen Prize (1990), and the Kossuth Prize (1992).

== Later life ==
Sütő had his eye gouged out during the 1990 ethnic clashes of Târgu Mureș, and had to undergo treatment in Hungary. He died on 30 September 2006 in Budapest, where he was undergoing treatment for cancer.

== Selected works ==
=== Drama ===
- Mezítlábas menyasszony (Barefoot Bride), 1950
- Pompás Gedeon (Gedeon the Pompous), 1967
- Csillag a máglyán (Star at the Stake), 1974
- Egy lócsiszár virágvasárnapja (The Palm Sunday of a Horse Dealer), 1975
- Káin és Abel (Cain and Abel), 1977
- Advent a Hargitán (Advent in the Hargita Mountain), 1985
- Alomkommandó (Dream Commando), 1987
- Balkáni gerle (Collared Dove), 1999

=== Novels and short stories ===
- Félrejáró Salamon (By-Stepping Salomon), 1956
- Anyám könnyű álmot ígér (Mother Promises a Light Dream), 1970

=== Essays and memoirs ===
- Engedjétek hozzám jönni a szavakat (Let the Words Come to Me), 1977
- Perzsák (Persians), 1981
- Szemet szóért (Eye for a Word), 1993
