= Vasile Pop =

Imperial Austrian ethnic Romanian physician

Vasile Pop (1789 – March 6, 1842) was an Imperial Austrian ethnic Romanian medical doctor.

Born into an intellectual family in Chimitelnic, Mureș County, Transylvania, he began his education at the Greek-Catholic gymnasium in Târgu Mureș. He then went to the Piarist high school in Cluj, followed by the University of Vienna. He received a doctorate in philosophy in 1814, becoming the first Romanian to do so, according to Gheorghe Asachi. In 1817, he received a second doctorate, in medicine. Later that year, he moved to Brașov, where he wrote a treatise on the mineral water of Arpătac, Bodoc and Covasna, considered the first Romanian-language medical work. In 1820, Asachi invited several Transylvanian intellectuals, including Pop, to teach in Iași, the capital of Moldavia. There, Pop became director of the Romanian Orthodox Socola seminary, where he also taught philosophy and philology. He was obliged to leave after several months, due to the outbreak of an uprising in neighboring Wallachia.

In 1828, he began working as a doctor in the Făgăraș area, where he was tasked with combating a plague. The following year, he moved to the mining center of Zlatna, where he became chief medical officer and spent the remaining thirteen years of his life. He visited the various mining towns in order to familiarize himself with the workers' conditions and drafted recommendations for better organizing medical and social services. He dealt with work-related diseases and accidents, vaccination of children, endemic diseases and the betterment of conditions for doctors. He became close friends with George Bariț; 39 of their letters, which touch on political and cultural matters, survive. The two collaborated on a series of articles, with Pop showing particular interest in orthography. In early 1842, as Pop lay dying, the surrounding villages would send messengers to find out his state. When he died, the crowd standing in the square in front of his home burst into tears. He is buried in Zlatna's Orthodox cemetery.
