= Valea Sarchii =

- Location within Romania

Location
- Country: Romania
- Counties: Mureș County

Physical characteristics
- Mouth: Pârâul de Câmpie
  - location: Sânger
  - coordinates: 46.5483°N 24.1261°E
- Length: 10 km (6.2 mi)
- Basin size: 40 km^{2} (15 sq mi)

Basin features
- Progression: Pârâul de Câmpie→ Mureș→ Tisza→ Danube→ Black Sea

The Valea Sarchii is a left tributary of the Pârâul de Câmpie in Romania. It flows into the Pârâul de Câmpie in Sânger. Its length is 10 km (6.2 mi) and its basin size is 40 km^{2} (15 sq mi).
