= Teofil Oroian =

Romanian Army officer and historian

Teofil Oroian (born September 20, 1947) is a Romanian Army officer and military historian.

== Biography ==
He was born in Chimitelnic (today Cipăieni), in Mureș County. He graduated from the Ștefan cel Mare Military High-School in Câmpulung Moldovenesc in 1966 and from the Nicolae Bălcescu Military School of Active Officers in Sibiu as military engineer in 1969. In 1981 he graduated with degrees in History and Philosophy from the University of Bucharest. In November 1996, he earned a Ph.D. degree in military science on military history.

Oroian was an associate and assistant professor at the NCO Military Engineering School between 1977 and 1981 and at the Carol I National Defence University between 1981 and 1994. Between 1994 and 2002 he was first officer, bureau chief and chief adjunct of Military Archivistic Service (today Military Service for Archives and Documentation). Since February 28, 2002 he is colonel in reserve.

He has published numerous studies and articles in history and military science journals. He has also authored several books and co-authored a short movie scenario.

== Works ==
- PhD thesis, Acțiuni militare desfășurate de trupele române în Kuban și Crimeea, 1943–1944, 1996
- Șefii Marelui Statului Major Român (1941–1945). Destine la răscruce, Editura Militară, Bucharest, 1995
- Petre Otu, Teofil Oroian, and Emil Ion, Personalități ale gândirii militare românești, vol. I-II, Editura Academiei de Înalte Studii Militare, Bucharest, 1997–2001. ISBN 973-97008-2-9
- Tentația libertății. Operațiunea "Sumava" (1968) – un simplu pretext, Editura Militară, Bucharest, 1999
- Hitler – Antonescu. Caucazul și Crimeea, Editura Paideia, Bucharest, 1999
- Colonel Petre Brătilă, Teofil Oroian, Dumitru Dobre, Personalități ale medicinei militare românești, Editura Romcartexim, Bucharest, 1999. ISBN 973-9142-69-9
- Golgota Estului (iulie 1942 – martie 1944), Editura Fundației Culturale Române, Bucharest, 2000
- Teofil Oroian and Gheorghe Nicolescu, Șefii Statului Major General Român (1859–2000), Editura Europa Nova, Bucharest, 2001. ISBN 973-8158-03-6
- Comandanți ai Corpului 7 Armată, Editura Modelism, Dej, 2001
- co-authored the scenario of the short movie Memoria Oștirii. Arhivele Militare Române, Studioul Cinematografic al Armatei, 2001
