= Sânger =

- Commune
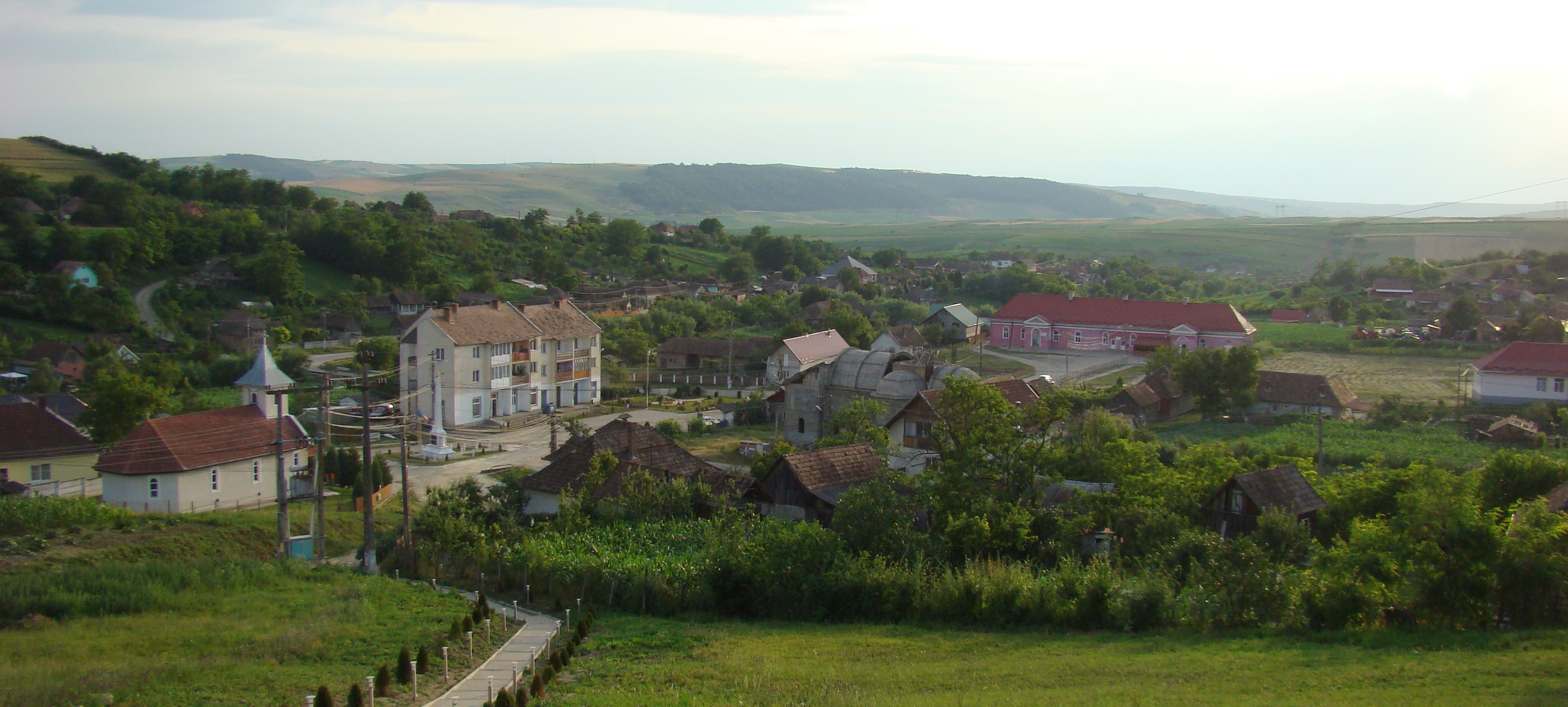
- Panoramic view of Sânger

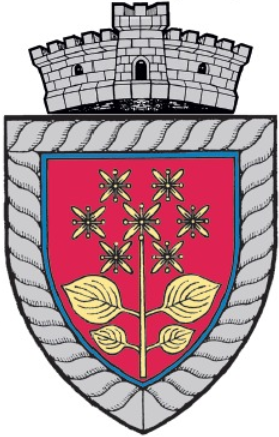
- Coat of arms

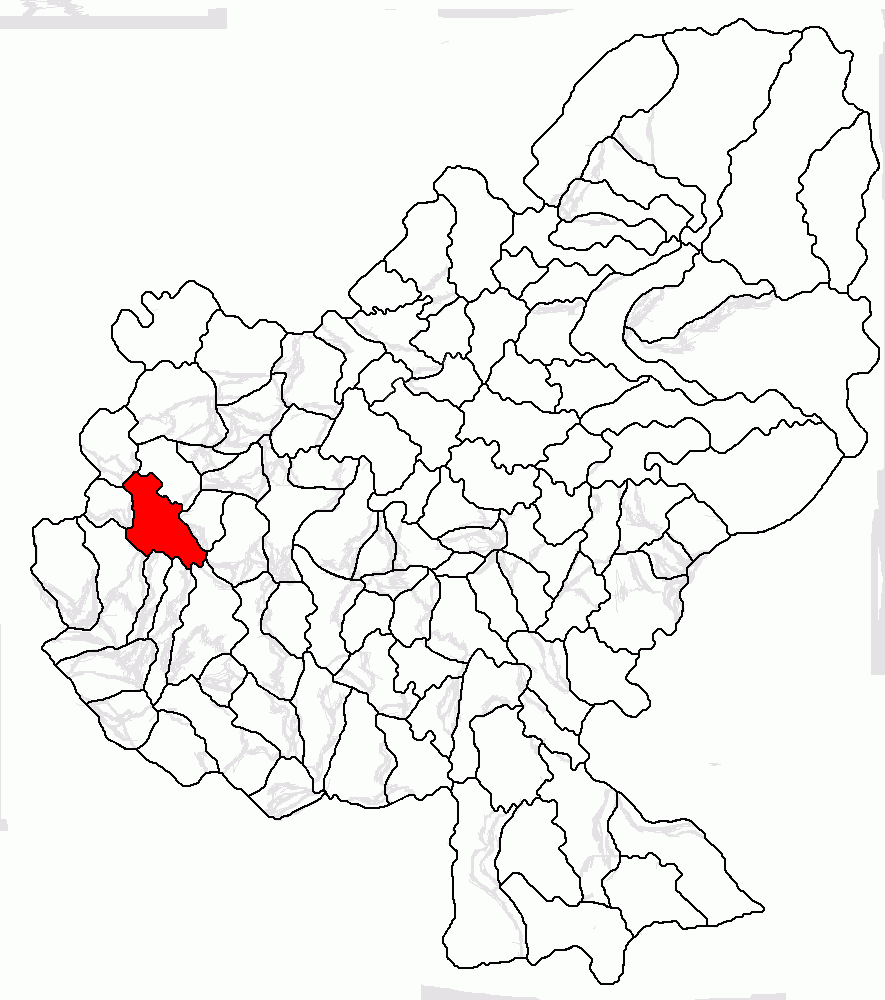
- Location in Mureș County

- Location in Romania
- Coordinates: 46.55°N 24.13°E
- Country: Romania
- County: Mureș

Government
  - Mayor (2024–2028): Vasile Grec (Ind.)
- Area: 51.51 km^{2} (19.89 sq mi)
- Elevation: 312 m (1,024 ft)
- Population (2021-12-01): 2,133
  - Density: 41.41/km^{2} (107.2/sq mi)
- Time zone: UTC+02:00 (EET)
  - Summer (DST): UTC+03:00 (EEST)
- Postal code: 547540
- Area code: (+40) 02 65
- Vehicle reg.: MS
- Website: comunasanger.ro

Sânger (Hungarian: Mezőszengyel [ˈmɛzøːsɛɲɟɛl]) is a commune in Mureș County, Transylvania, Romania that is composed of seven villages: Bârza (Borza), Cipăieni (until 1996, Chimitelnic; Keménytelke), Dalu (Fodorkút), Pripoare (Pripora), Sânger, Vălișoara (Sárkihíd), and Zăpodea (Zapodia).

Sânger lies on the Transylvanian Plateau, on the banks of Pârâul de Câmpie and it's affluent, Valea Sarchii. It is located in the western part of Mureș County, 9 km (5.6 mi) north of the town of Luduș and 43 km (27 mi) west of the county seat, Târgu Mureș. It is crossed by the single-track 94 km (58 mi) Luduș–Șieu-Măgheruș railway line and by the county road DJ 153G.

In 2002, the commune had a population of 2,530, of which 87% were Romanians, 7% Hungarians, and 6% Roma. At the 2021 census, Sânger has a population of 2,123; of those, 71.73% were Romanians, 18.94% Roma, and 3.61% Hungarians.

== Natives ==
- Gheorghe Cipăianu (1878–1957), agronomist and politician
- Teofil Oroian (born 1947), officer and military historian
- Vasile Pop (1789–1842), physician
