= Pârâul de Câmpie =

Pârâul de Câmpie Ludas-patak
- Location within Romania

Location
- Country: Romania
- Counties: Bistrița-Năsăud, Mureș
- Communes: Budești, Sărmașu, Miheșu de Câmpie, Zau de Câmpie, Tăureni, Sânger, Luduș

Physical characteristics
- Source
  - elevation: 410 m (1,350 ft)
- Mouth: Mureș
  - location: Luduș
  - coordinates: 46.4797°N 24.1008°E
- Length: 59 km (37 mi)
- Basin size: 643 km^{2} (248 sq mi)

Basin features
- Progression: Mureș→ Tisza→ Danube→ Black Sea

The Pârâul de Câmpie (Hungarian: Ludas-patak) is a right tributary of the river Mureș in Transylvania, Romania. It discharges into the Mureș in Luduș. Its length is 59 km (37 mi) and its basin size is 643 km^{2} (248 sq mi).

== Tributaries ==
The following rivers are tributaries to the river Pârâul de Câmpie (from source to mouth):

- Left: Ciciana Mare, Șes, Valea Sarchii
- Right: Valea Morii, Corabia, Fundătura
