= Silivașu de Câmpie =

- Commune
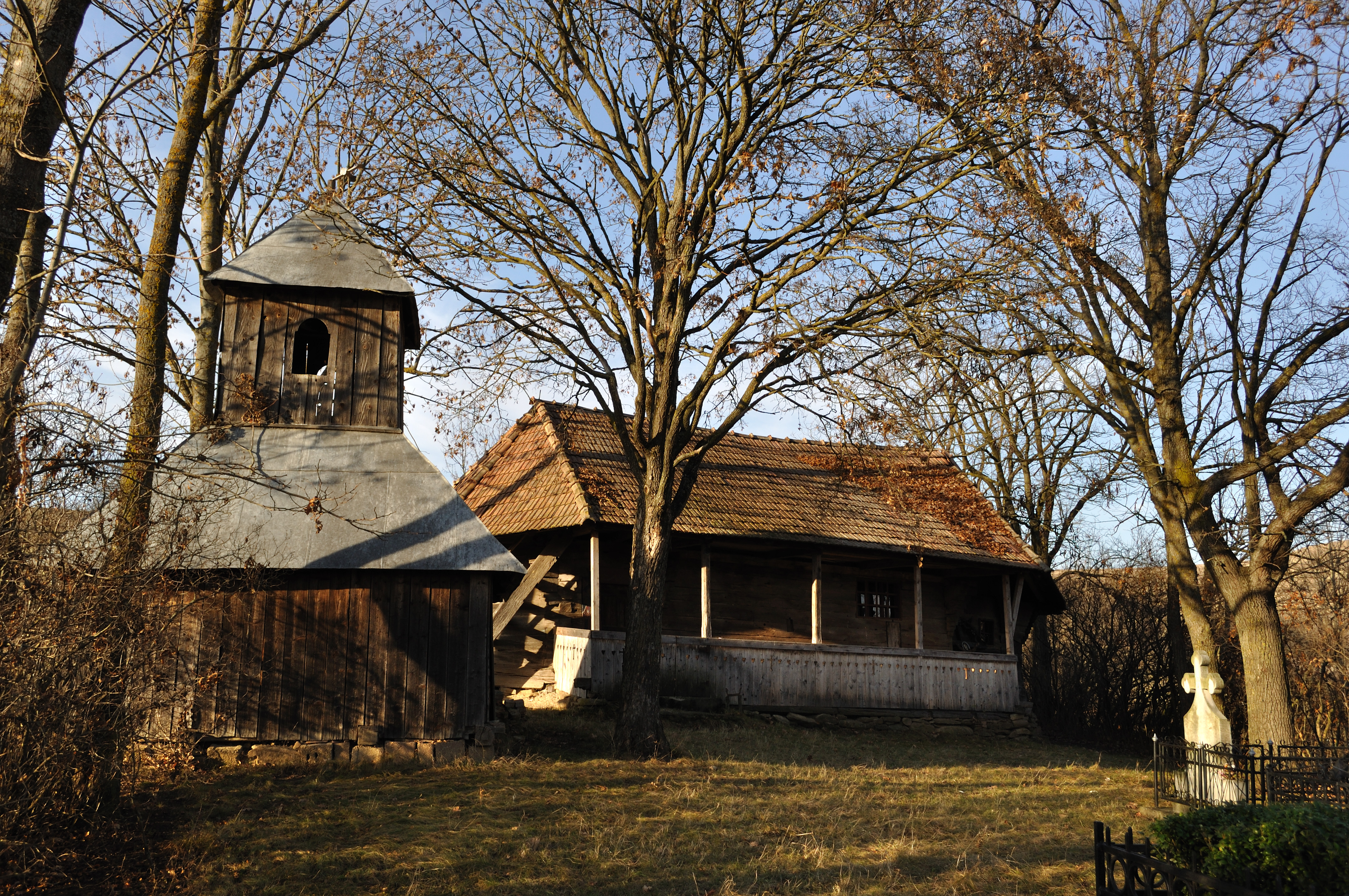
- Wooden church in Fânațele Silivașului

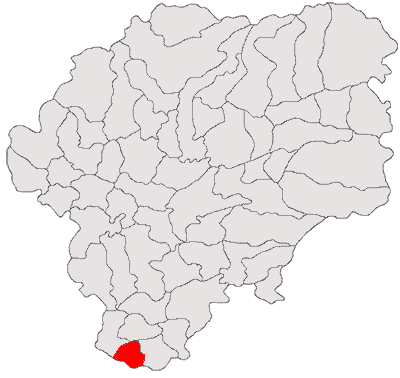
- Location in Bistrița-Năsăud County

- Location in Romania
- Coordinates: 46°47′N 24°18′E
- Country: Romania
- County: Bistrița-Năsăud

Government
  - Mayor (2020–2024): Ioan-Tiberiu Cămărășan (PSD)
- Area: 30.62 km^{2} (11.82 sq mi)
- Elevation: 378 m (1,240 ft)
- Population (2021-12-01): 841
  - Density: 27.5/km^{2} (71.1/sq mi)
- Time zone: UTC+02:00 (EET)
  - Summer (DST): UTC+03:00 (EEST)
- Postal code: 427270
- Area code: +(40) 263
- Vehicle reg.: BN
- Website: www.silivasudecampie.ro

Silivașu de Câmpie (Hungarian: Mezőszilvás) is a commune in Bistrița-Năsăud County, Transylvania, Romania. It is composed of four villages: Draga (Drágatanya), Fânațele Silivașului (Bircágtanya), Porumbenii (Jobojtanya), and Silivașu de Câmpie.

The commune is situated on the Transylvanian Plateau, at an altitude of 378 m (1,240 ft), on the banks of the river Șes. It is located at the southern extremity of the county, 52 km (32 mi) from the county seat, Bistrița, on the border with Mureș County. Silivașu de Câmpie is crossed by national road DN16, which connects it to Cluj-Napoca, 65 km (40 mi) to the west, and to Reghin, 37 km (23 mi) to the east.
