= Journal of Radioanalytical and Nuclear Chemistry =

- Discipline: Chemistry
- Language: English
- Edited by: Tibor Braun

Publication details
- History: 1968-present
- Publisher: Springer (Netherlands)
- Frequency: Monthly
- Impact factor: 1.373(2020)

Standard abbreviations
- ISO 4: J. Radioanal. Nucl. Chem.

Indexing
- ISSN: 0236-5731 (print); 1588-2780 (web)

Links
- Journal homepage

The Journal of Radioanalytical and Nuclear Chemistry is a peer-reviewed scientific journal published by Springer Science+Business Media. It publishes original papers, review papers, short communications and letters on nuclear chemistry. Some of the subjects covered are nuclear chemistry, radiation chemistry, nuclear power plant chemistry, radioanalytical chemistry, and environmental radiochemistry.

== Impact factor ==
The Journal of Radioanalytical and Nuclear Chemistry had a 2014 impact factor of 1.034, ranking it 15th out of 34 in the subject category "Nuclear Science and Technology", 57th out of 74 in "Analytical Chemistry", and 31st out of 44 in "Inorganic and Nuclear Chemistry".

== Editor ==
The founding editor in chief is Tibor Braun.

== Indexing ==
This journal is indexed by the following services:

- Science Citation Index
- Journal Citation Reports/Science Edition,
- Scopus
- Inspec
- EMBASE
- Chemical Abstracts Service (CAS)
- CSA Environmental Sciences
- CAB International
- CAB Abstracts
- Current Contents/Physical, Chemical and Earth Sciences
- Food Science and Technology Abstracts
- GeoRef
- Global Health
- INIS Atomindex
- Referativnyi Zhurnal/VINITI
