= Pogăceaua =

- Commune
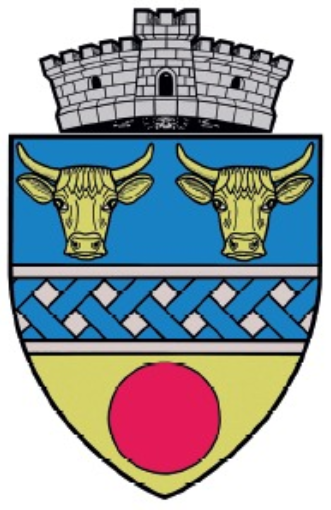
- Coat of arms

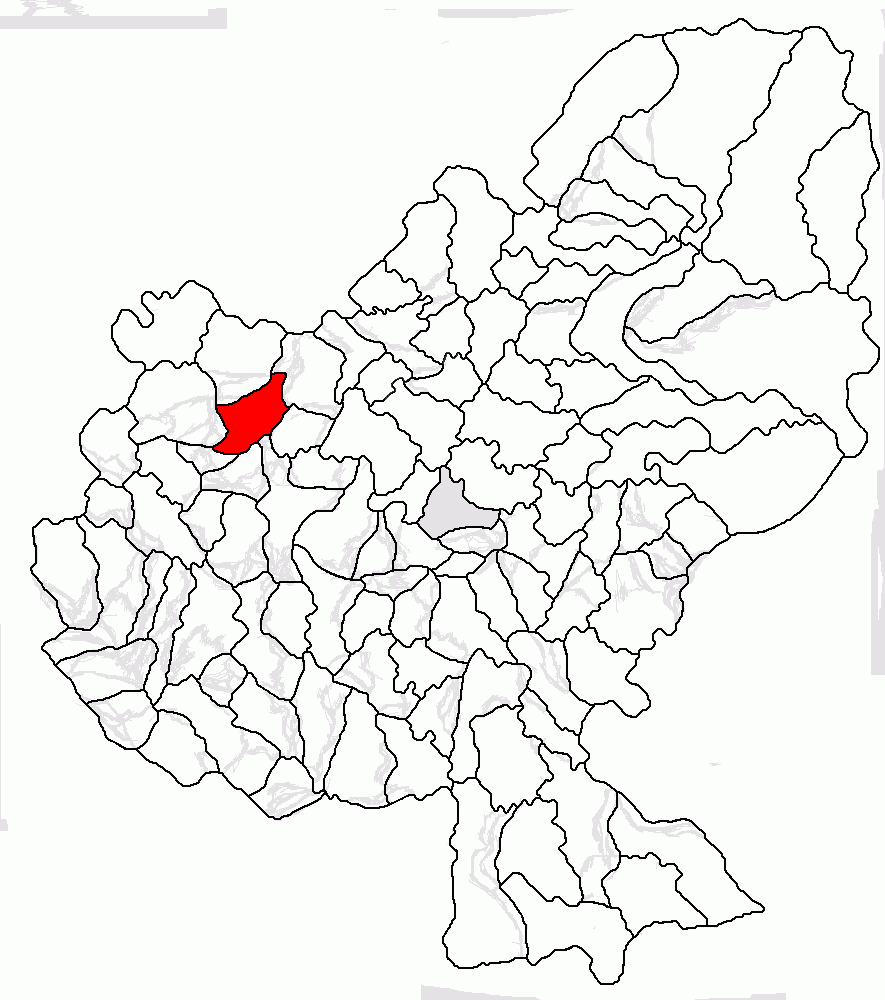
- Location in Mureș County

- Location in Romania
- Coordinates: 46°41′N 24°18′E
- Country: Romania
- County: Mureș

Government
  - Mayor (2020–2024): Florin-Cristian Ștefan (PSD)
- Area: 37.97 km^{2} (14.66 sq mi)
- Elevation: 355 m (1,165 ft)
- Population (2021-12-01): 1,890
  - Density: 50/km^{2} (130/sq mi)
- Time zone: EET/EEST (UTC+2/+3)
- Postal code: 547465
- Area code: (+40) 0265
- Vehicle reg.: MS
- Website: pogaceaua.ro

Pogăceaua (Hungarian: Mezőpagocsa [ˈmɛzøːpɒɡotʃɒ]) is a commune in Mureș County, Transylvania, Romania composed of ten villages: Bologaia (Balogéja), Ciulea (Csulja), Deleni (Ökröstó), Fântâna Babii, Pârâu Crucii, Pogăceaua, Scurta, Sicele, Valea Sânpetrului, and Văleni.

The commune lies in the Transylvanian Plain, on the banks of the river Șes and its left tributary, Bologa. It is located in the western part of the county, 33 km (21 mi) northwest of the county seat, Târgu Mureș.

Historical population
Year	Pop.	±%
1850	1,470	—
1880	1,352	−8.0%
1900	1,823	+34.8%
1910	1,997	+9.5%
1930	2,288	+14.6%
1941	2,843	+24.3%
1966	3,128	+10.0%
1977	2,594	−17.1%
1992	1,879	−27.6%
2002	1,983	+5.5%
2011	2,117	+6.8%
2021	1,890	−10.7%
Source: Census data

As of the 2011 census, Pogăceaua had a population of 2,117, of which 82.2% were Romanians, 15.1% Roma, and 1.3% Hungarians. At the 2021 census, the commune had a population of 1,890; of those, 76.51% were Romanians and 16.61% Roma.

== See also ==
- List of Hungarian exonyms (Mureș County)
