= Horea, Cloșca and Crișan National College =

Coordinates: 46.0665°N 23.5637°E

Horea, Cloșca and Crișan National College (Romanian: Colegiul Național Horea, Cloșca și Crișan) is a high school located at 1 Decembrie 1918 Boulevard, nr. 11, Alba Iulia, Romania.

The school opened in February 1919, two months after the union of Transylvania with Romania. It occupied the building of the former Hungarian state school, and was named after Michael the Brave. There were four grades totaling 127 fee-exempt boy pupils and 45 fee-paying, of whom 37 were girls. A 1922 visit by Education Minister Constantin Angelescu, disturbed by the poor conditions, led to the allocation of funds for a new building, still in use. Work began in spring 1923, on a plot of land donated by private owners; the building was ready for use in the autumn of 1940.

During the interwar period, the school experienced a rich cultural and scientific life: a literary and scientific magazine was published; the library was expanded; museums of history, archaeology and natural sciences were set up; a small botanical garden was opened in the yard; societies were created for reading, music, sports, the Red Cross, Orthodox and Greek-Catholic activities.

In 1944–1945, near the end of World War II, the school closed, its building turned into a Soviet military hospital. Students returned for the 1945–1946 year, at which point their education started to be influenced by the Romanian Communist Party-dominated government of Petru Groza. Politically unreliable teachers were fired, courses were politicized, student publications were censored before being shut down, study of the Russian language was made compulsory while French, English and Italian were eliminated. Girls had been accepted as regular pupils by 1956, when the name of Michael the Brave was dropped. In 1960, it was named for the leaders of the Revolt of Horea, Cloșca and Crișan. The school was declared a national college in 1999.

== Alumni ==
- Nicolae Giosan
