= Frata =

- Commune
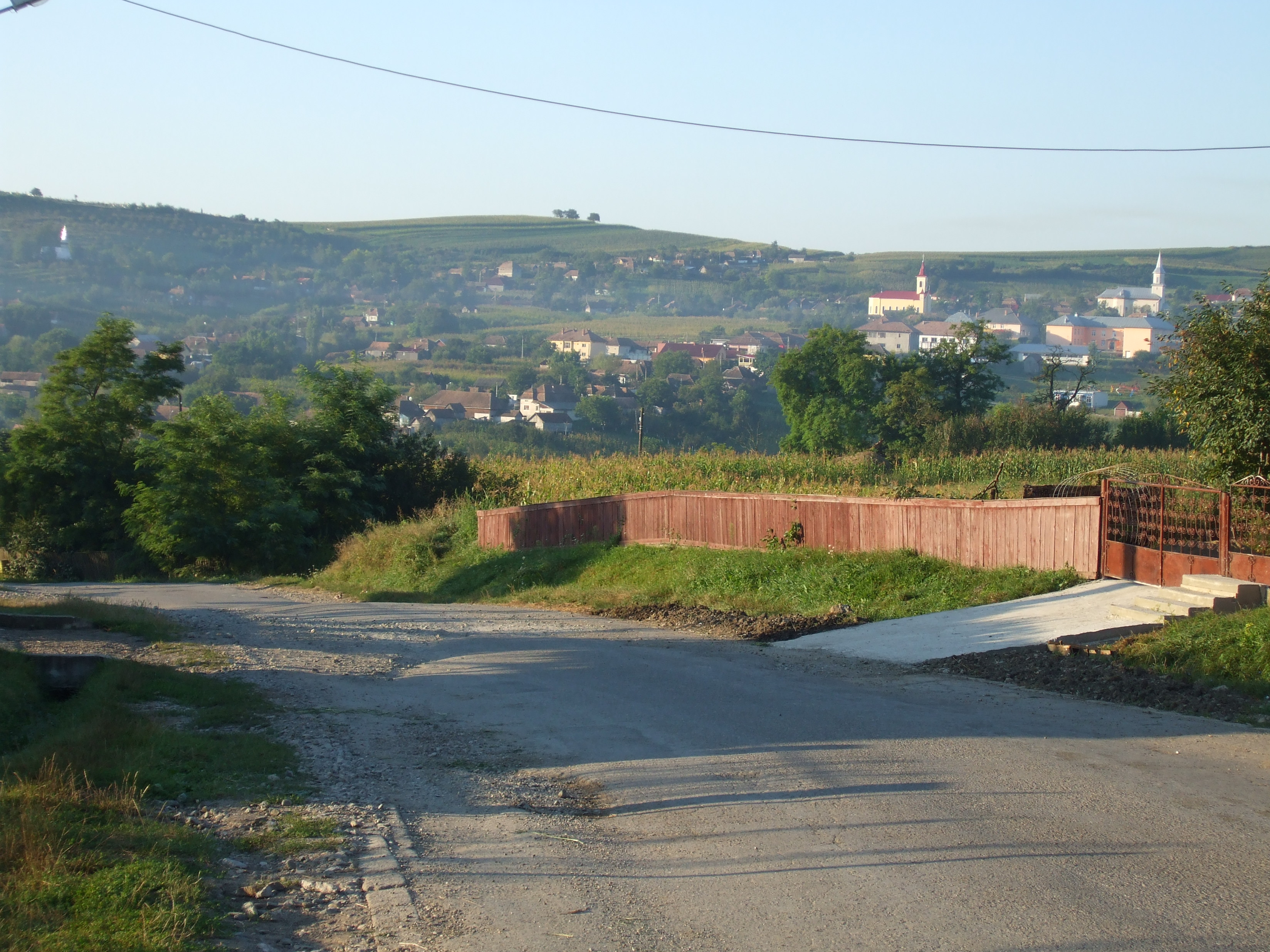

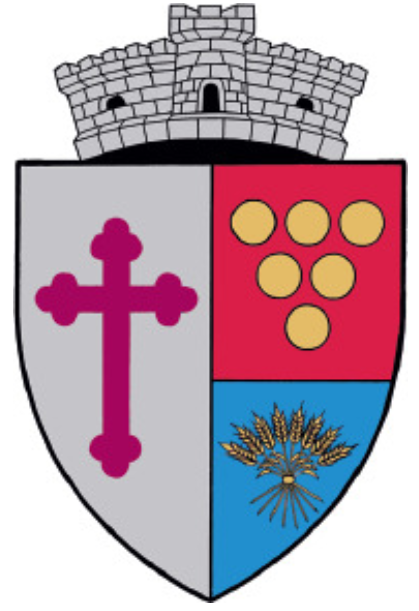
- Coat of arms

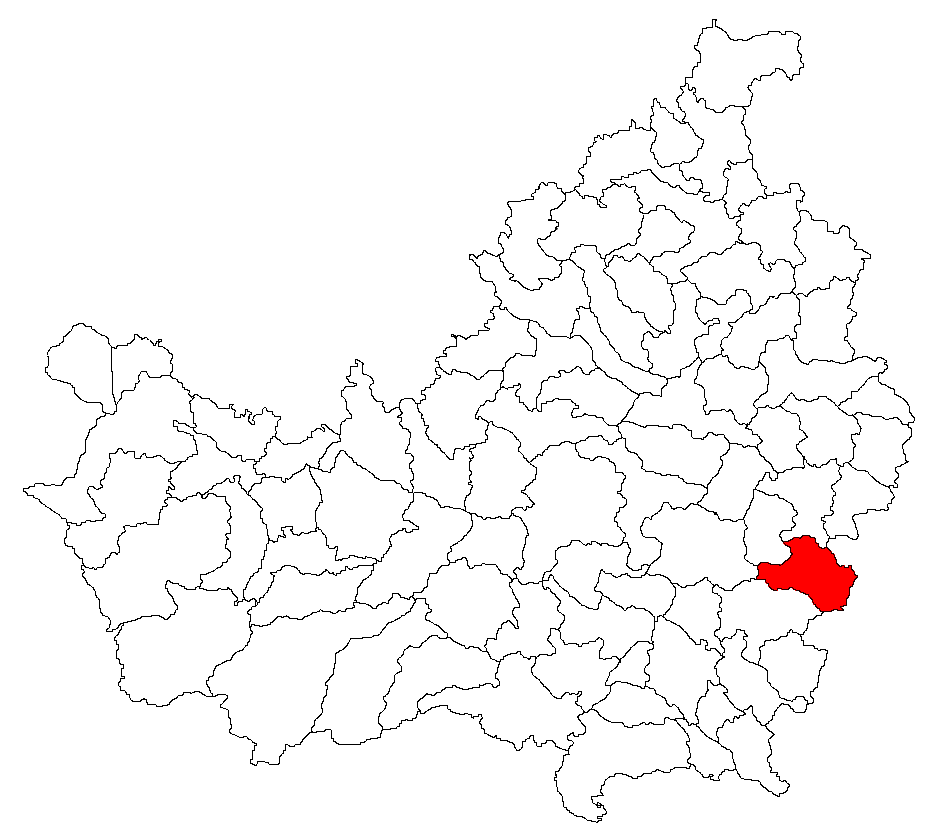
- Location in Cluj County

- Location in Romania
- Coordinates: 46°42′19″N 24°03′39″E
- Country: Romania
- County: Cluj
- Established: 1241
- Subdivisions: Berchieșu, Frata, Oaș, Olariu, Pădurea Iacobeni, Poiana Frății, Soporu de Câmpie

Government
  - Mayor (2020–2024): Cristian-Miron Cherecheș (PSD)
- Area: 73.01 km^{2} (28.19 sq mi)
- Elevation: 396 m (1,299 ft)
- Population (2021-12-01): 3,791
  - Density: 51.92/km^{2} (134.5/sq mi)
- Time zone: UTC+02:00 (EET)
  - Summer (DST): UTC+03:00 (EEST)
- Postal code: 407285
- Area code: +(40) x64
- Vehicle reg.: CJ
- Website: primariafrata.ro

Frata (Hungarian: Magyarfráta) is a commune in Cluj County, Transylvania, Romania. It is composed of eight villages: Berchieșu (Berkenyes), Frata, Oaș, Olariu, Pădurea Iacobeni, Poiana Frății (Bethlentanya), Răzoare (Rozor), and Soporu de Câmpie (Mezőszopor).

== Demographics ==
According to the census from 2002 there were 4,382 people living in this commune; of this population, 87.49% were ethnic Romanians, 8.19% ethnic Roma, and 4.24% ethnic Hungarians. At the 2021 census, Frata had a population of 3,791; of those, 86,73% were Romanians, 5.62% Roma, and 2.8% Hungarians.

== Natives ==
- Ioan Ploscaru (1911 – 1998), bishop of the Greek-Catholic Church
- Vasile Suciu (1942 – 2013), footballer
