= Nicolae Giosan =

Romanian politician

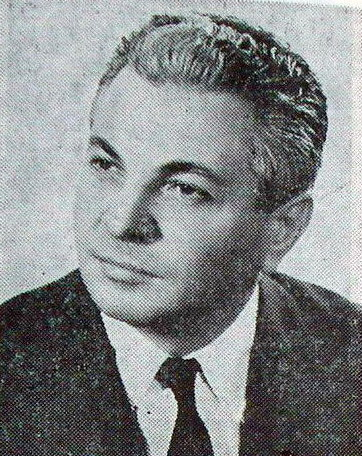
Nicolae Giosan

Nicolae Giosan (December 30, 1921 – July 31, 1990) was a Romanian agricultural engineer and communist politician.

== Biography ==
=== Origins and scientific career ===
Born in Drâmbar, Alba County, his parents Ioachim and Maria were peasants who owned six hectares of land. They had three other children who remained on the land. Despite material difficulties, Nicolae was a top student throughout his academic career. Following primary school in his native village from 1927 to 1932, he attended Mihai Viteazul High School in Alba Iulia from 1932 to 1940. Then, from 1940 to 1945, Giosan studied at the Cluj Agronomy Faculty, temporarily relocated to Timișoara due to the Second Vienna Award. In 1952, he earned a doctorate from the Moscow Timiryazev Agricultural Academy. This degree helped spur the young Giosan’s rapid rise in academia and politics, as the country faced a dearth of educated communists dedicated to the ongoing collectivization project.

He worked as a teaching assistant in Cluj from 1945 to 1949, and was appointed professor of genetics and plant improvement in 1952. He held a similar position at the Bucharest Agronomy Faculty from 1953 to 1957. Initially heading the Cluj agronomy research station, he was inaugural director of the maize cultivation research institute at Fundulea outside Bucharest, from 1957 to 1962. As such, he worked closely with future leader Nicolae Ceaușescu, who then headed the party’s agricultural section. After leaving, he became full professor and department head at the Bucharest Agronomy Institute. In 1969, he became president of the agricultural and forestry sciences academy. Elected a corresponding member of the Romanian Academy in 1963, he advanced to titular status in 1974. In 1972, he was made foreign member of VASKhNIL.

=== Party politics ===
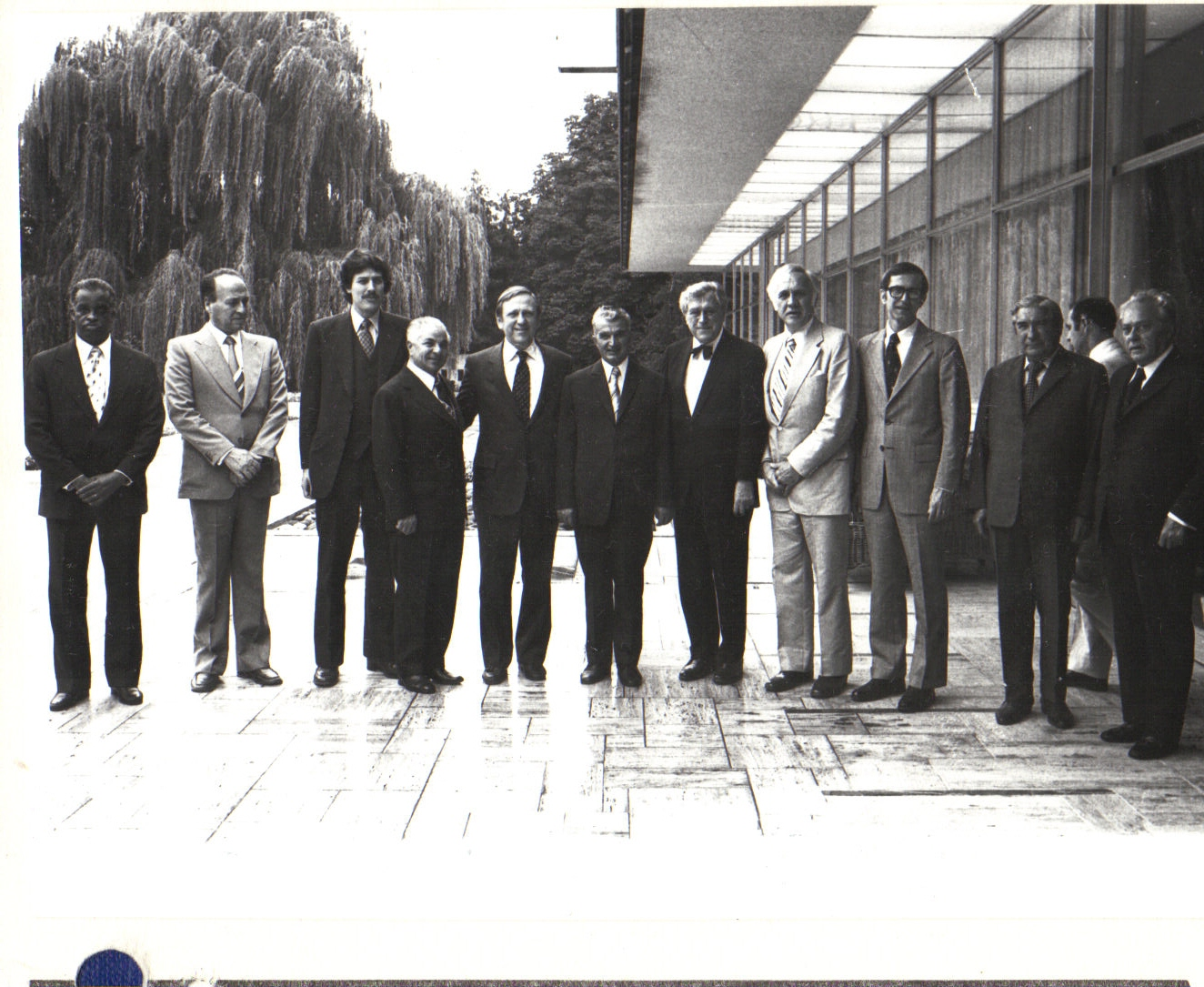
Giosan (4th from left) helps welcome US Congressman John Brademas (5th left) to Romania, together with Nicolae Ceaușescu (6th left), August 1979

Although uninterested in politics as a student, Giosan joined a union in 1946. Motivated to support collectivization by the experience of his poor, hard-working parents, he entered the Romanian Communist Party in 1947, going on to a career in the party and state bureaucracy that spanned much of the communist regime. In 1949, castigated for insufficient vigilance against a Christmas celebration, he declared he had never believed in God, “perhaps” excepting his earliest years. He taught at the science and education section of the party’s central committee until 1953, at which point he became adjunct to the Agriculture Minister. At the end of 1955, he became a substitute member of the central committee; meanwhile, from 1955 to 1961, he belonged to the Bucharest regional party committee.

In 1960, he became a full member of the central committee, remaining until the Romanian Revolution. Serving as vice president of the higher agricultural council from 1962 to 1965, he was its president from that point until 1969. In 1966, he joined the committee for the State Prize. For eight days in November 1969, he was Minister of Agriculture and Forestry. In 1974, he joined the central committee for Systematization. The same year, he became substitute member of the central committee’s political executive bureau (CPEx), until the Revolution. From 1962 to 1974 and again from 1979, he sat on the State Council. In 1974, he joined the national council for environmental protection, while in 1980, he became vice president of the national council for science and technology. Also that year, he joined the higher council for education and teaching, while in 1981, he became adjunct to the central committee’s head of party work in agriculture.

=== As legislator and downfall ===
Giosan served in the Great National Assembly for 32 years, representing the following districts: Cămărașu (1957–1961), Lupșanu (1961–1965), Fundulea (1965–1969), Zimnicea (1969–1975), southern Sibiu (1975–1980), Căzănești (1980–1985), and Adjud (1985–1989). From July 1974 until the 1989 Revolution, he was Assembly President. As such, he played a decorative role, receiving a script from party headquarters and reading it during sessions without deviating. Giosan traveled widely and played host to many visiting legislators; he visited the United States in 1961 and returned in 1980 as head of a parliamentary delegation. Among his many awards were the Order of Labor, third class (1954), second class (1958) and first class (1962); the State Prize (1964) and the Order of the Star of the Romanian Socialist Republic, first class (1971 and 1981).

Arrested during the Revolution and scheduled to be tried alongside other CPEx members, he died some seven months later at Jilava Prison. According to the testimony of two fellow prisoners, Giosan was murdered via lethal injection administered by a mysterious doctor.

Giosan spoke French and Russian. He was married and had two children.
