= Mociu =

- Commune
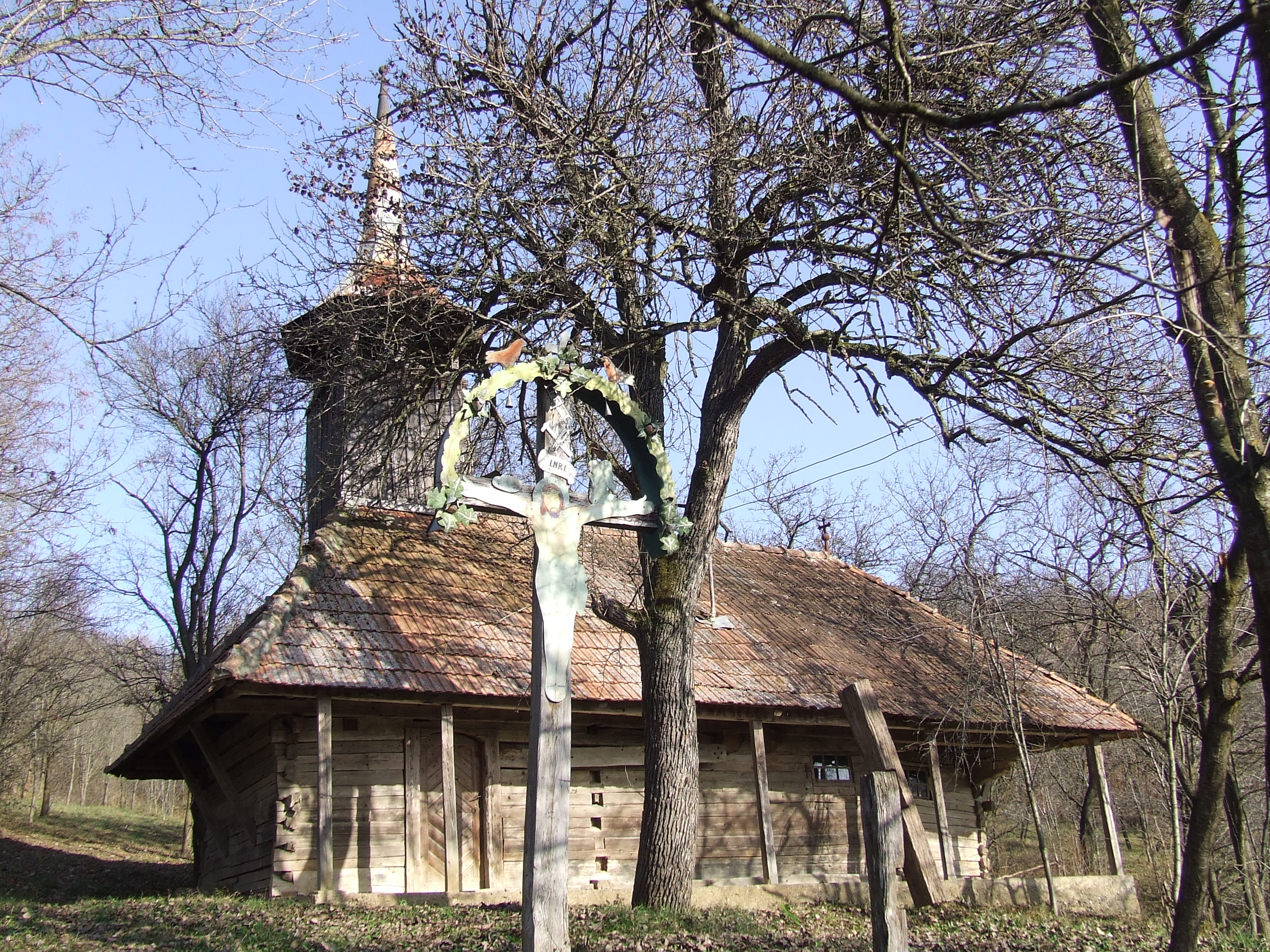
- Wooden church in Chesău

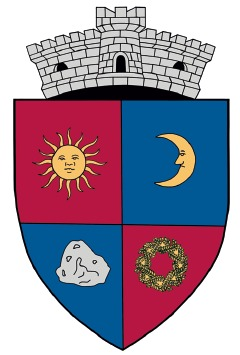
- Coat of arms

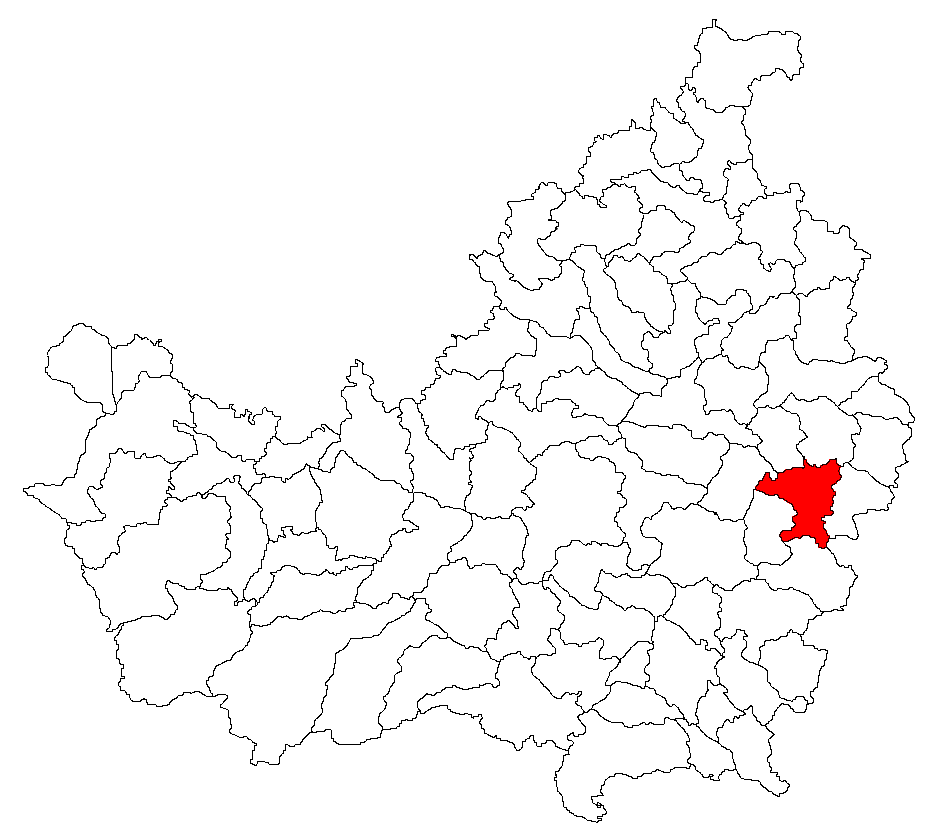
- Location in Cluj County

- Location in Romania
- Coordinates: 46°47′45″N 24°2′7″E
- Country: Romania
- County: Cluj
- Subdivisions: Boteni, Chesău, Crișeni, Falca, Ghirișu Român, Mociu, Roșieni, Turmași, Zorenii de Vale

Government
  - Mayor (2020–2024): Vasile Focșa (PNL)
- Area: 73.41 km^{2} (28.34 sq mi)
- Elevation: 357 m (1,171 ft)
- Population (2021-12-01): 3,300
  - Density: 45/km^{2} (120/sq mi)
- Time zone: UTC+02:00 (EET)
  - Summer (DST): UTC+03:00 (EEST)
- Postal code: 407420
- Area code: (+40) 0264
- Vehicle reg.: CJ
- Website: primariamociu.ro

Mociu (Hungarian: Mócs) is a commune in Cluj County, Transylvania, Romania. It is composed of nine villages: Boteni (Botháza), Chesău (Mezőkeszü), Crișeni (Tótháza), Falca (Falka), Ghirișu Român (Mezőgyéres), Mociu, Roșieni (Bárányvölgy), Turmași (Tormásdűlő), and Zorenii de Vale.

== Demographics ==
Historical population
Year	Pop.	±%
1850	2,796	—
1880	2,974	+6.4%
1890	3,503	+17.8%
1900	3,902	+11.4%
1910	4,304	+10.3%
1920	4,527	+5.2%
1930	4,829	+6.7%
1941	5,382	+11.5%
1956	5,758	+7.0%
1966	5,346	−7.2%
1977	4,914	−8.1%
1992	3,728	−24.1%
2002	3,494	−6.3%
2011	3,313	−5.2%
2021	3,300	−0.4%
Source: Census data

According to the census from 2002 there was a total population of 3,494 people living in this commune; of this population, 74.09% were ethnic Romanians, 17.02% ethnic Hungarians, and 8.84% ethnic Roma. At the 2021 census, Mociu had a population of 3,300; of those, 68.94% were Romanians, 12.91% Roma, and 12.06% Hungarians.

== Natives ==
- Marcel Socaciu (born 1972), rugby union player.
