= Budești, Bistrița-Năsăud =

Budești
- Commune
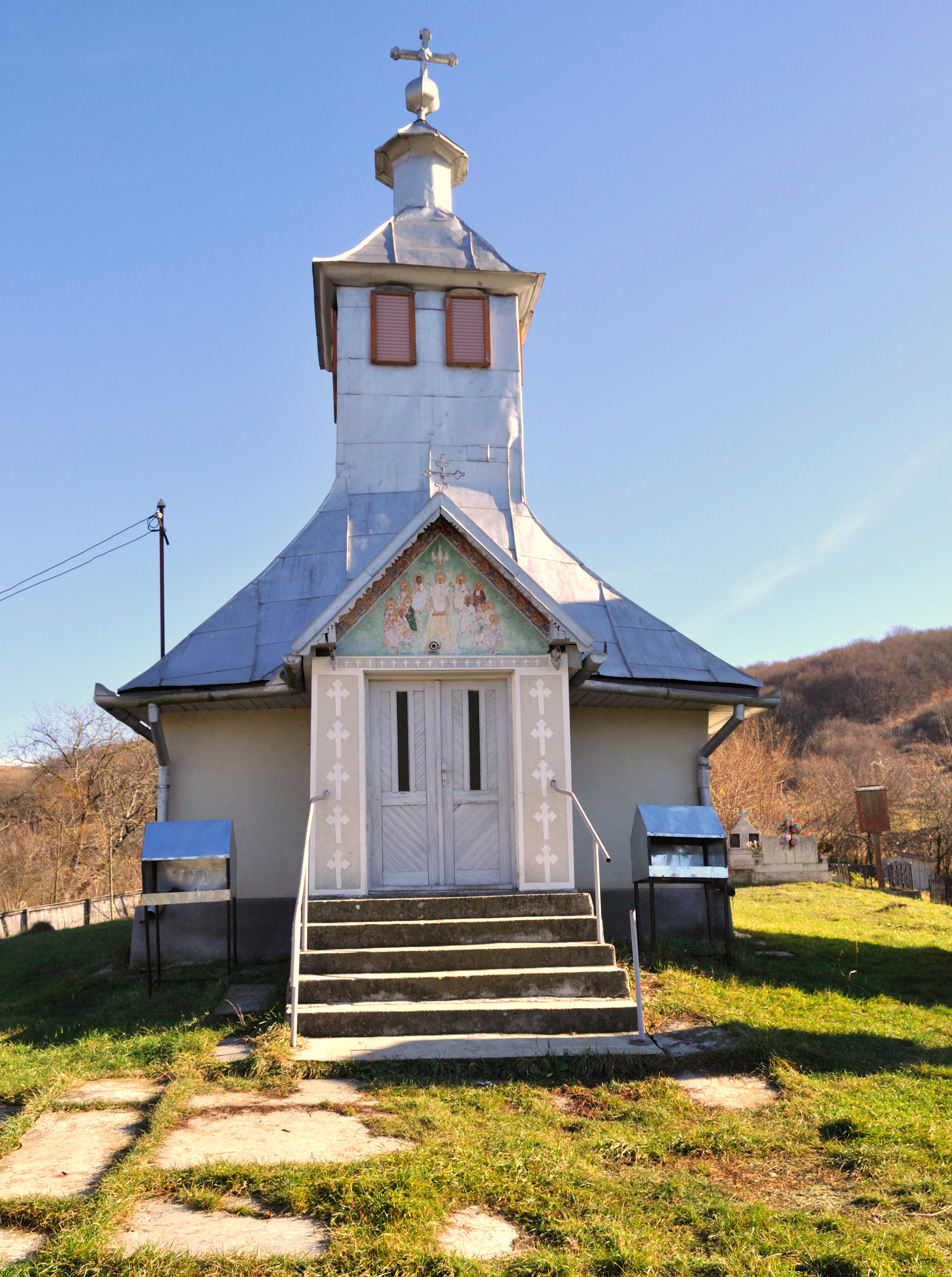
- Wooden church in Țăgșoru

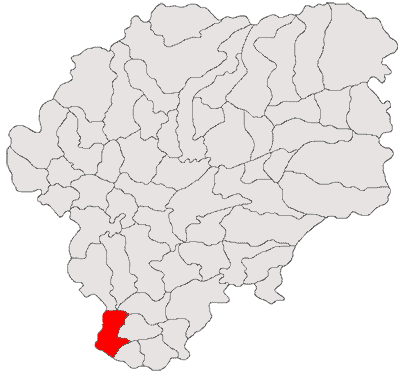
- Location in Bistrița-Năsăud County

- Location in Romania
- Coordinates: 46°53′N 24°15′E
- Country: Romania
- County: Bistrița-Năsăud

Government
  - Mayor (2020–2024): Vasile Codrea (PSD)
- Area: 53.15 km^{2} (20.52 sq mi)
- Elevation: 365 m (1,198 ft)
- Population (2021-12-01): 1,780
  - Density: 33.5/km^{2} (86.7/sq mi)
- Time zone: UTC+02:00 (EET)
  - Summer (DST): UTC+03:00 (EEST)
- Postal code: 427020
- Area code: +40 x59
- Vehicle reg.: BN
- Website: primariabudesti.ro

Budești (Hungarian: Budatelke; German: Budaken) is a commune in Bistrița-Năsăud County, Transylvania, Romania. It is composed of four villages: Budești, Budești-Fânațe (Szénásbudatelke), Țagu (Nagycég; German: Groß-Zegendorf), and Țăgșoru (Kiscég; German: Klein-Zegendorf).

The commune is located at the southern extremity of Bistrița-Năsăud County, 52 km (32 mi) southwest of the county seat, Bistrița, on the border with the Cluj and Mureș counties.
