= Gheorghe Gaston Marin =

Romanian engineer and politician

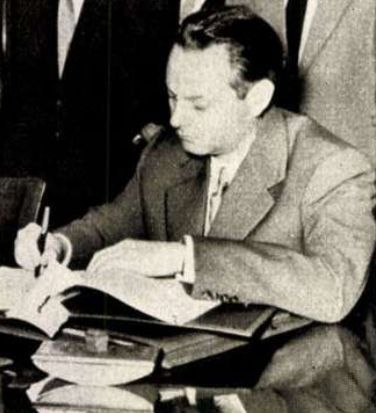
Gheorghe Gaston Marin

Gheorghe Gaston Marin (April 14, 1918, Chișineu-Criș – February 25, 2010, Bucharest) was a Romanian communist politician who had many roles under Gheorghe Gheorghiu-Dej and Nicolae Ceaușescu. He was born Gheorghe Grossmann in Pădureni, Arad County. In the 1980s, he emigrated to Israel, but later returned to Bucharest, where he died.

== Early life and education ==
He was born into a wealthy Jewish family in northern Transylvania. In his youth, he was a member of Poale Zion. In 1936, he moved to Paris to study mathematics and physics at the Sorbonne. Marin studied electrical engineering at Grenoble, France between 1938 and 1940. Like most other Romanian Jews, he lost his Romanian citizenship in 1938.

== Second World War in France ==
In 1940, he served with the French Army. In 1940, Northern Transylvania was transferred under the Second Vienna Award from Romania to Hungary, and as such his parents and siblings came under Hungarian rule.

A member of the French Resistance, he was given charge of the FTP-MOI's south-western region. He began his resistance career in Lyons and later moved to Toulouse. He adopted as his alias Gaston Marin, which after the war he took as his surname. Finally, he moved to work with the miners of Carmaux, long famous in France for their militancy. In July 1944 he instigated the revolt at the Tarn mines, one of the first steps in the French liberation from German occupation. In August 1944, Gaston liberated the French city of Carmaux, capturing 120 German soldiers. A few days later, he also liberated Albi, the capital of the Tarn region. Upon his return to Romania, he learned that in 1944 his entire family had been deported by the Hungarian authorities to Auschwitz, where all of them had been exterminated.

== In Communist Romania ==
After the start of Communist Romania, he became Councillor of the Romanian Council of Ministers in 1945–1949 and Minister of the Economy in 1948–1949; he was part of Romania's delegation to the Paris Peace Conference. From 1949 to 1954, Gaston Marin was Minister of Electrical Energy and Electrical Industry, and then, up to 1965, President of the Planning Committee. From 1955 to 1966, he served as President of State Committee for Nuclear Energy, and was (1962–1969) Vice-president of the Ministerial council, as well as Minister of Metallurgy, Mining, Chemistry, Transport and Telecommunications, Building, Chemical Industry, and National Trading.

In 1963, after attending John F. Kennedy's funeral, he established diplomatic relations with the Western world, including the United States. Those steps were highly encouraged by the United States government and US President Lyndon B. Johnson, and gained Romania a privileged communist country status.

From 1969 to 1982, Marin was President of the Pricing Committee, until being removed from official positions by Ceaușescu, being by far the last Gheorghiu-Dej supporter to be eliminated from the Romanian government.

== Zionist period ==
In 1989 he made aliyah (emigrated to Israel), but later returned to Romania. In his 2000 memoirs, În serviciul României lui Gheorghiu-Dej. Însemnări din viață, he announced his conversion from Communism to Zionism, writing: "Appreciating the end of the communist regimes and the grave attacks on ethics and morality propagated by communism, I now consider that Zionism, Herzl's dream, remains today an urgent necessity for the Jewish people. In reality, even after the Second World War, the propagation of antisemitism begins to appear in all the countries of the world. Only in the Judenstaat, a land of the Jews, which has been founded as the result of the heroic struggle of the sons of this people, can it be sure of a genuine homeland, the defence and the protection of the Jewish people".

== Comments on resistance-time Manouchian affair ==
In L’Affaire Manouchian, he defended Boris Holban against the allegation that he was the police informer who betrayed Missak Manouchian. In his memoirs he criticized the thesis of Stéphane Courtois and Mosco Boucault put forward in their 1985 documentary Des terroristes à la retraite (Terrorists in Retirement), stating : "It is asserted or suggested that certain arrests of MOI resisters were made thanks to French resisters. According to 'witnesses', the PCF broke relations with the MOI and dislocated in various regions MOI cadres with a view to paralysing their activity...The protagonists with such opinions do not know or forget the strict rules of illegality, the necessity to break links in order to prevent, via filature, the pursuit and fall of a part of or all of an organisation. The absence of Holban from the leadership of the FTP-MOI in the Paris region, during a period when he asked to be moved to another region, has been used in a wide press, television and cinema campaign to tarnish this hero of the Resistance, making him responsible for the fall and execution of the Groupe Manouchian, when the culprit was the traitor Davidowicz, condemned and executed by the Resistance."

== Personal life ==
Marin had three, or more, children: Ileana, Jackie (married to Radu Osman, emigrated to Israel), and son Minu (physicist at MIT, born in France, deceased).

== Books and articles ==
- Bowd, Gavin (December 2014). "Romanians of the French Resistance". French History. 28 (4): 541–559. doi:10.1093/fh/cru080. hdl:10023/9636.
