= Sânpetru de Câmpie =

- Commune
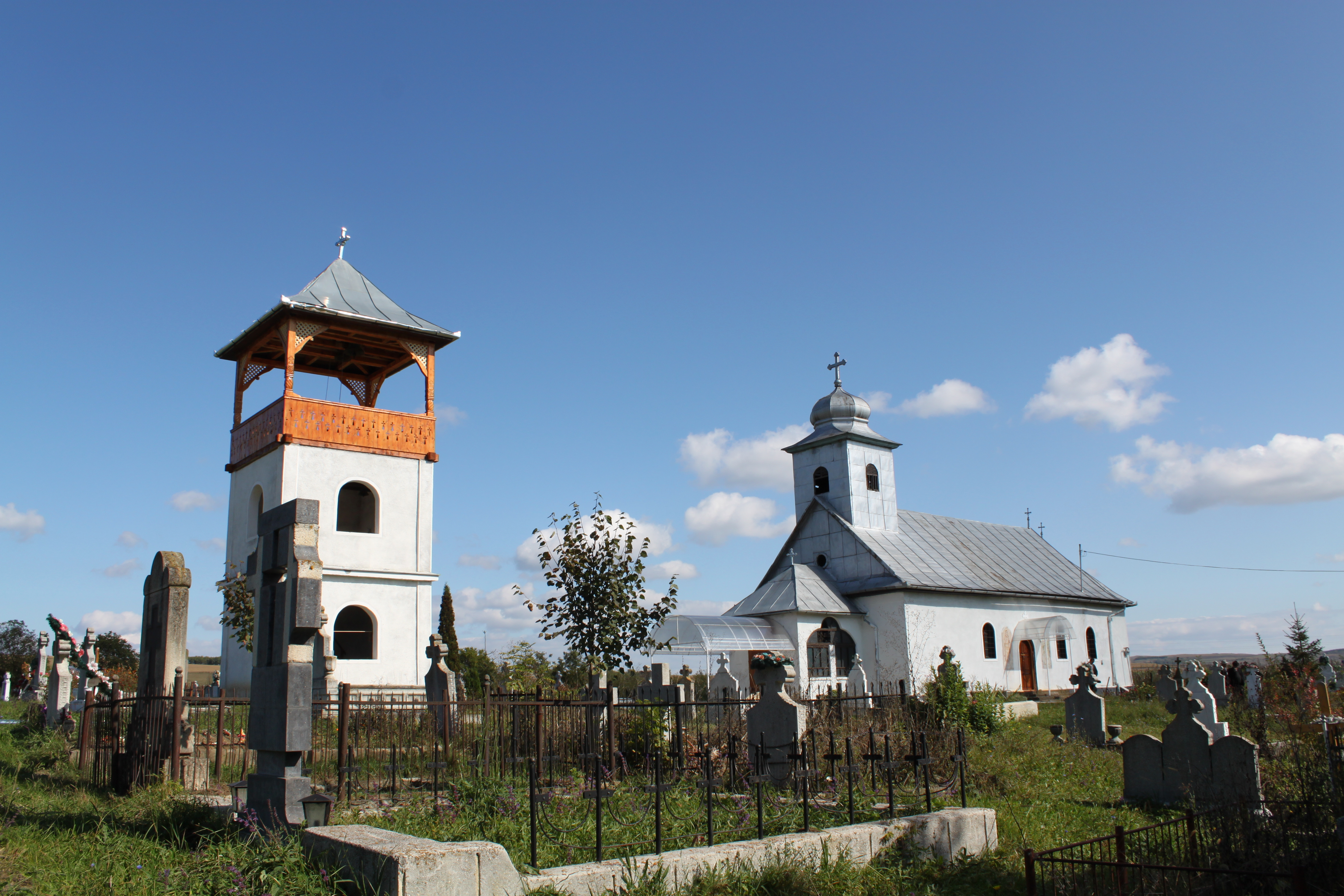
- Wooden church in Tușinu

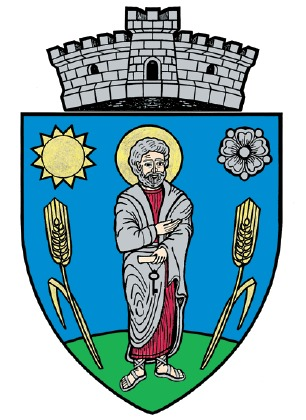
- Coat of arms

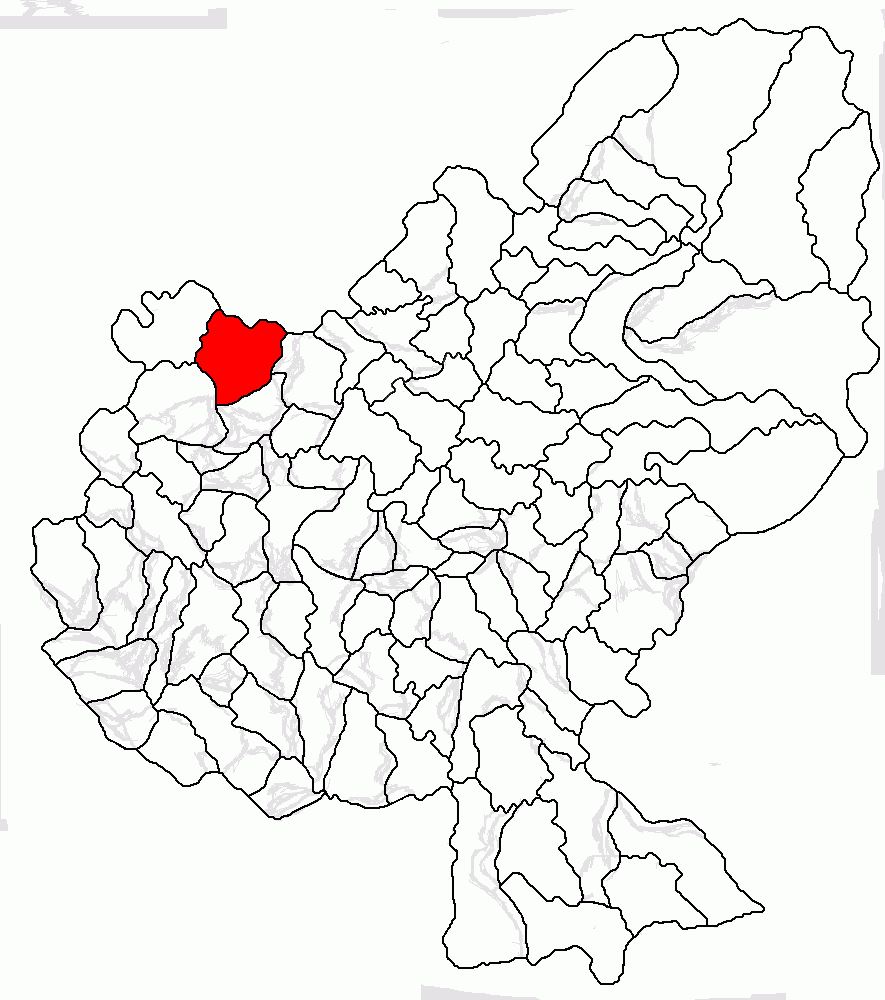
- Location in Mureș County

- Location in Romania
- Coordinates: 46.72°N 24.27°E
- Country: Romania
- County: Mureș

Government
  - Mayor (2024–2028): Spiru Șerban Crăciun (PSD)
- Area: 63.84 km^{2} (24.65 sq mi)
- Elevation: 370 m (1,210 ft)
- Population (2021-12-01): 2,723
  - Density: 42.65/km^{2} (110.5/sq mi)
- Time zone: UTC+02:00 (EET)
  - Summer (DST): UTC+03:00 (EEST)
- Postal code: 547555
- Area code: (+40) 0265
- Vehicle reg.: MS
- Website: sanpetrudecampie.ro

Sânpetru de Câmpie (Hungarian: Uzdiszentpéter or Uzdi-Szent-Péter, Hungarian pronunciation: [ˈuzdisɛntpeːtɛr]) is a commune in Mureș County, Transylvania, Romania that is composed of six villages: Bârlibaș (Barlabás), Dâmbu (Meződomb), Satu Nou (Strinatanya), Sângeorgiu de Câmpie (Uzdiszentgyörgy), Sânpetru de Câmpie, and Tușinu (Tuson).

At the 2021 census, the commune had a population of 2,723; of those, 77.52% were Romanians, 13.15% Roma, and 2.72% Hungarians.
