= Gogu Rădulescu =

Romanian politician (1914–1991)

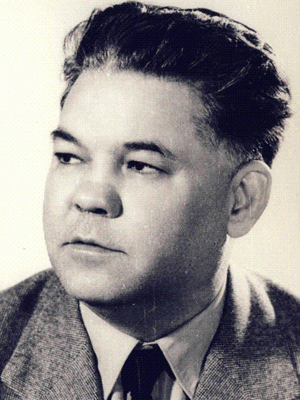
- Rădulescu's official portrait

Deputy Prime Minister of Romania
- In office 31 October 1963 – 19 March 1979

Romanian Minister of Internal Trade
- In office 24 November 1956 – February 1957

Romanian Minister of Trade
- In office 17 August 1959 – 30 April 1962

Romanian Minister of Foreign Trade
- In office 30 April 1962 – 31 October 1963

Chairman of the Higher Court of Financial Control
- In office 22 May 1973 – 22 December 1989
- Preceded by: Office established
- Succeeded by: Office disestablished; Ioan Bogdan from 1992

Member of the Great National Assembly
- In office March 1961 – 22 December 1989
- Constituency: Timișoara (1961–1965); Suceava (1965–1969); Alexandria (1969–1980); Buzău (1980–1985); Găești (1985–1989)

Personal details
- Born: Gheorghe Rădulescu; 5 September 1914 Bucharest, Kingdom of Romania
- Died: 24 May 1991 (aged 76) Bucureștii Noi, Bucharest, Romania
- Party: Romanian Communist (1949–1952, 1957–1989)
- Other political affiliations: Union of Communist Youth (1933–1937/8); Democratic Students' Front (1935–1937)
- Spouse: Dorina Rudich (m. 1938; died 1982)
- Children: 1
- Education: Bucharest Commercial Academy; Marxist-Leninist Night School; Political and Leadership University
- Occupation: Journalist; propagandist; schoolteacher; academic; soldier
- Awards: Knight of the Order of the Star of Romania, (1947); Ordinul Muncii, Second Class (1957); Order of the Star of the Socialist Republic of Romania, First Class (1964, 1984); Order of Tudor Vladimirescu, First Class (1966); Hero of Socialist Labor (1971)

Military service
- Allegiance: Kingdom of Romania; Soviet Union
- Branch/service: Romanian Land Forces; Red Army; Tudor Vladimirescu Division
- Years of service: 1937; 1941; 1943–1944
- Rank: Lieutenant (Romania)
- Battles/wars: Operation Barbarossa

Gheorghe "Gogu" Rădulescu (5 September 1914 – 24 May 1991) was a Romanian journalist, economist, and high-ranking figure of the communist regime. Of mixed Romani and Russian heritage, he began his leftist and anti-fascist militancy in the early 1930s, while a student at the Commercial Academy in Bucharest. He established a Democratic Students' Front, which embarked on a direct confrontation with the fascist Iron Guard, as well as with the conservative establishment of the Romanian Kingdom; supported by the clandestine Romanian Communist Party (PCR) and its Union of Communist Youth (of which he was a member from 1933), Rădulescu networked with moderate leftists and independents. In 1935, he organized a training camp in Moieciu, which was nearly broken up by the Gendarmes. In 1937, he was kidnapped and tortured by Iron Guard affiliates, and then also expelled from the Communist Youth for his apparent insubordination. Taking his doctorate in 1938, Rădulescu worked as a researcher for the Institute of Economic Conjecture, under his communist friend Belu Zilber.

During the early stages of World War II, Rădulescu was called to serve as a Lieutenant in the Romanian Land Forces. He deserted shortly before, or during, Operation Barbarossa (June 1941), surrendering to the Red Army. He was granted the same status as Romanian prisoners of war, and was transported to camps deep inside the Soviet Union. In 1943, he was recovered by the PCR's exile wing, or "Muscovite faction", and was tasked with recruiting Romanian captives for the Tudor Vladimirescu Division. Rădulescu returned in 1946, two years after the Soviet conquest of Romania, and was integrated into the country's new administrative apparatus. He was allowed to join the PCR (or "Workers' Party") in 1949, the year when he also rose to the position of Deputy Minister of Foreign Trade. In 1952, he was caught up in the roundup of alleged "right-wing deviationists" and wreckers of the economy, and arrested by the Securitate; he was allowed to preserve a teacher's post, and was slowly reintegrated politically, then fully rehabilitated, with the onset of Romanian de-satellization.

Rădulescu became a Minister of Internal Trade in 1956, but established his international profile from 1959, when he was Minister of Trade, and then of Foreign Trade, as well as serving continuously as Deputy Prime Minister in 1963–1979. Embraced by Nicolae Ceaușescu and his national-communists, who took control of the PCR in 1965, Rădulescu was granted a quasi-permanent seat on the Central Committee and its Politburo (or "Executive Committee"). He played a part in socialist industrialization by 1970, when he was instrumental in prospecting international markets, especially in developing countries, as well as in negotiating loans with the French Rothschilds. Later that decade, he renounced his positions in government, and was instead assigned to lead the Higher Court of Financial Control. Spurred on by his novelist wife Dorina, and already cultivating the poet Miron Radu Paraschivescu, he established his own literary circle, or "court", centered on his rural property in Comana. Rădulescu both undermined and selectively enforced communist censorship—specifically, against his ideological enemy Mircea Eliade; he was seen in the writers' community as rather more liberal than the standard nomenklatura.

As protector of the România Literară circle, with a say in the affairs of the Writers' Union, Rădulescu emerged as a selective critic of national-communism—while also fully participating in Ceaușescu's personality cult. In 1986, he took a public stand against "Protochronism", which he controversially depicted as an offshoot of interwar fascism. The Securitate followed closely his contacts with other political figures, noting him as a probable conspirator against the regime and a critic of its austerity policies; Rădulescu was still present by Ceaușescu's side throughout the Romanian Revolution of 1989, though he advised against its violent repression. He was immediately after captured and indicted for genocide and economic crimes by the National Salvation Front, but escaped prosecution due to his poor health, and died at a nursing home in 1991. The controversy—surrounding his political positioning, his cultural profile, and his role in various intrigues—was prolonged over the following decades.

== Biography ==
=== Early life and FSD ===
Born in Bucharest on 5 September 1914, Gheorghe Rădulescu was almost exclusively known under the pet name "Gogu" to the age of sixty. Though officially listed as having "Romanian nationality and citizenship", he was the son of a Romani musician (Lăutar) father and a Russian mother, who had met on tour in Saint Petersburg. One of his acquaintances, Egon Balas, described Gogu as a man of "strange features, [who] resembled a Tatar khan". He and his four siblings were paternally orphaned in 1923, with the eldest brother, Alexandru, playing violin for cinema-goers, as a means to support the others. After graduating from Cantemir High School, where he was colleagues with future Surrealist Gellu Naum, young Rădulescu embraced a career in economics. He took a diploma from the Higher-level Commercial School No 2 in 1931, enlisting at the Commercial Academy (Faculty of General Economics) the following year.

Rădulescu graduated from the Academy in 1937, as one of the few diploma-holders of lower-class origins; by then, he was in engaged to Dorina Rudich. A PCR militant of Jewish ethnicity, she was born at Roznov on 23 May 1909, and was noted as a good friend of poet Ilarie Voronca. They were married in 1938, when Dorina was a typist for Lafayette General Store in Bucharest. Rădulescu's own communist activity was being monitored by agents of the Siguranța. His file included the mention: "[he] was the organizer and leader of all student action and strikes […]. as part of communist propaganda work during the school year 1935—1936." As an economist and journalist, Rădulescu openly embraced historical materialism with an October 1935 article in Revista de Studii Sociologice și Muncitorești, describing Italian fascism as a "brazen dictatorship of the bourgeoisie". His fiancee, meanwhile, contributed a series of anti-fascist articles and sketch stories in Petre Pandrea's Cuvântul Liber. Rădulescu also became a contributor, with a column on student affairs.

In May or June 1935, Rădulescu had set up the Democratic Students' Front (FSD). It was designed as a method of curbing the rise of Iron Guard fascists, and functioned as a legal annex of the outlawed PCR. Headquartered at Batiștei Street 26, in downtown Bucharest, the FSD primarily included communist students—Rădulescu, Miron Constantinescu, Mihnea Gheorghiu, Corneliu Mănescu, Manea Mănescu—and teachers—Eduard Mezincescu, Florica Mezincescu, Pompiliu Macovei. Rădulescu was the FSD's country-level president, with Mihail I. Dragomirescu as a general secretary. They maintained permanent contact with the Union of Communist Youth (UTC), through "a comrade with the conspiratorial name Emil, who remains unidentified to this day", and then through Constantinescu and Tatiana Leapis-Bulan. Most members were also affiliated with the UTC, but some, like Petre Vulpescu, represented the Popovici Socialists, and a "very small number" were Social Democrats. Despite its far-leftist coloring, the organization also came to include National Peasantists, Radical Peasantists, as well as independents.

In a 1984 article, poet Alexandru Voitin recalled that Rădulescu was an "occasional songwriter", who had "put together" an FSD march honoring peasant hero Vasile Ursu Nicola. Rădulescu obtained support from painter Victor Brauner, who had previously affiliated with the French Revolutionary Artists; Victor tried to convince his brother, the composer Harry Brauner, to write "revolutionary hymns" in support of the cause. The FSD put out its own magazine, Studentul Român, between 27 June 1935, and 31 May 1936. Dragomirescu obtained imprimatur from the Siguranța after submitting a false list of editors, including the non-communist Pericle Martinescu (who was not informed of this until 1981). After Ispas Zâmbrea, who organized an FSD chapter in Teleorman County, also created a self-defense unit, Studentul Român advised all his readers to copy his example.

On 16 March 1936, Rădulescu himself was at Chișinău, appearing as a defense witness for Petre Constantinescu-Iași—an academic who had been charged with activities in support of the PCR after setting up an Anti-Fascist Committee. In his deposition, Rădulescu "[spoke] about the political currents in the universities", informing the jury that the FSD had allied itself with Constantinescu-Iași. In late 1935, he had embarked on a collaboration with the Crusade of Romanianism, which had broken out of the Guard; the organization were able to cancel a Guardist protest. He followed the same pattern in June 1936, when he sealed a pact with Dem I. Dobrescu and his Citizens' Committees, managing to "prevent fascist hooligans from creating disorder." He was himself arrested by the Siguranța at some point in 1936, and, during interrogations by Commissioner Turcu, was invited to become an informant, but refused. Turcu reportedly warned him that his activities were closely followed, and that, unless he gave up on the PCR, he would end up "rotting in jail".

On 25 July 1936, Cuvântul Liber hosted a piece by Rădulescu and Ilie Constantinovski, in which they announced the FSD summer camp in Moieciu, which was partly an answer to Guardist camps, and also promised to train students in offering assistance to local peasants. The event took place in August, and brought Rădulescu himself to Moieciu, where he lectured about the Great Depression in Romania. After the right-wing Universul published an expose about the FSD camp as a "communist nucleus", Rădulescu and Constantinovski returned with another article in Cuvântul Liber, reporting that the Iron Guard and National-Christian Defense League were recruiting the wealthy peasants of Predeal and Satulung for a violent march on Moieciu. Preparing themselves for this confrontation (including by purchasing eight revolvers), the students were instead surrounded by the local Gendarmes, on 9 August. In the resulting siege, the FSD voted to go on a hunger strike, as a means of publicizing their cause; on 12 August, Rădulescu and his colleagues published a letter of protest in Dimineața daily, noting that the Romanian left was suffering under a "regime of terror", whereas the "tens of Guardist camps carry on with their Hitlerite propaganda, totally unhindered". Negative publicity forced the Gendarmes to lift their siege, allowing the camp to function until its scheduled closure, on 20 August; five days later, Dimineața hosted a sympathetic reportage by Stephan Roll, which was effectively a pierce of UTC propaganda. Overall, Rădulescu's activism largely failed at generating a following in the student body.

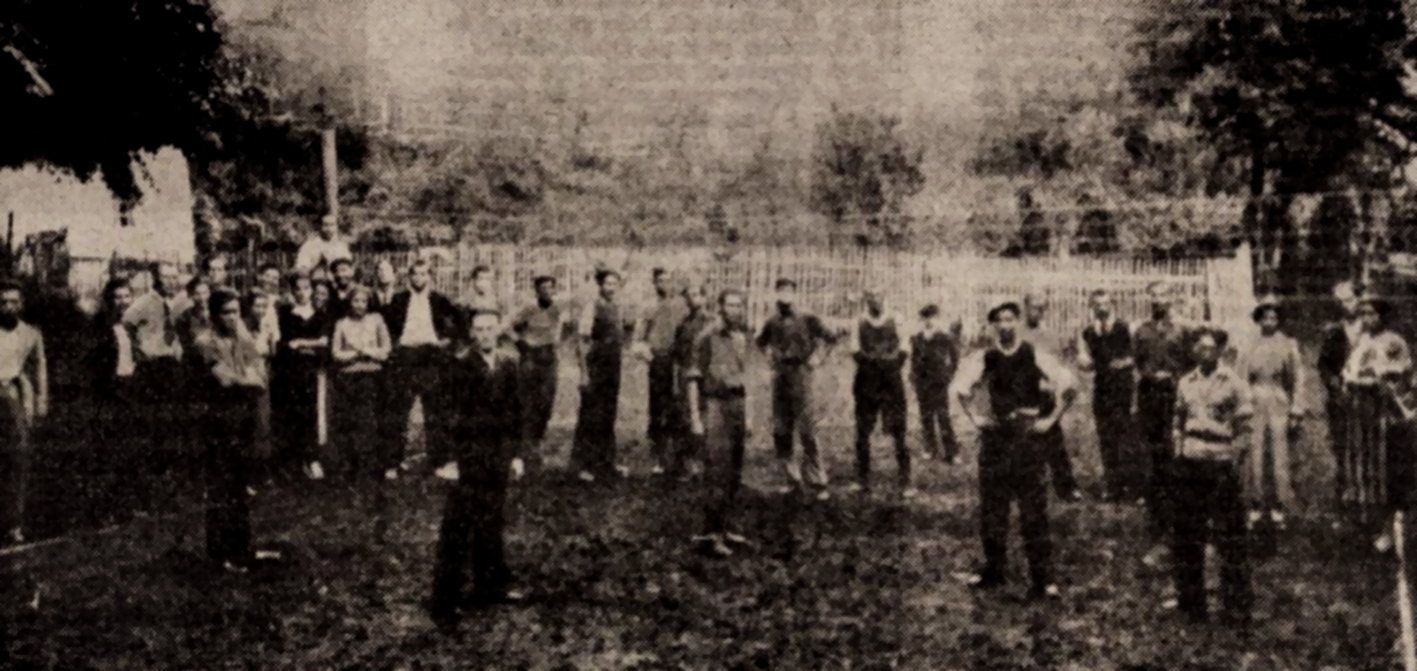
Democratic Students' Front members during a volleyball match in Moieciu, August 1936

=== Wartime desertion and return ===
During the Spanish Civil War (1936–1937), Rădulescu helped recruit local volunteers for the International Brigades. He befriended a number of left-wing activists and journalists, variously including Roll, N. D. Cocea, Miron Radu Paraschivescu, Paul Păun, Alexandru Sahia, Virgil Teodorescu, Dolfi Trost, and Ștefan Voicu. In 1952, he recounted that his first mentors were Constantinovski (who "instilled in me a great love for the Soviet Union") and Vulpescu. Another reported connection was D. I. Suchianu, who allowed Rădulescu's contributions to appear in Viața Romînească magazine. His own party records suggests that he joined the UTC in 1933, but also that he was excluded in 1937, when his FSD mandate also ended. Researcher Stelian Tănase suggests that Rădulescu lost his membership in 1938, when the UTC's loyalism to the Soviet cause was verified by the Communist International. Vulpescu, who had been integrated into the UTC and been granted favors as its Secretary, was purged "in the same session", for his alleged Trotskyism. Tănase also notes that Rădulescu's expulsion, which followed months of inactivity on his part, was taken by a vote of his friends, including Constantinescu and Constanța Crăciun. The PCR bureaucracy recorded his "anarchic outlook" as the main reason for his removal, adding that he "no longer had links with the revolutionary movement" during the 1940s. Rădulescu himself claimed that he effectively joined the PCR in 1938—the year in which, on Leonte Răutu's advice, he began forging papers and organizing conspiratorial houses in support of more prestigious militants. He acknowledged that, if the UTC expulsion had ever been warranted, it was because of his habit of "cracking jokes, with no attention paid as to whether these could be interpreted as politically incorrect", and also because he had unwittingly insulted Constantinescu.

In 1987, Rădulescu justified his FSD work as prompted by the Guard's success: "fascism, with its pernicious propaganda, had seeped deep down into university milieus. We ran into the Guardists everywhere, including at seminars. Most of them were entirely fanatical. And when they ran out of so-called theoretical arguments, they moved on to threats, and just about always followed up on them. There was nothing more saddening than the wet-rope flopping that Guardist students would savagely use, in Guardist safe-houses, against colleagues that did not share their political opinions." This description matches Rădulescu's personal experience: in early 1937, he was kidnapped by Guardist students at the Faculty of Medicine, who took him to their hiding sport and tortured him. This was conceived of as a punishment for Rădulescu having insulted the Guardist Captain, Corneliu Zelea Codreanu, and left him incapacitated for some two weeks. The incident was reportedly welcomed by the right-wing essayist Mircea Eliade, who gleefully noted that Rădulescu being "beaten with wet ropes" was only good news. Eliade told Mihail Sebastian that: "It's what should be done to traitors. He, Mircea Eliade, would not have been content with that; he'd have pulled out [Rădulescu's] eyes as well."

In 1938, shortly after completing his mandatory service with the Romanian Land Forces (3rd Regiment), Rădulescu received his doctorate in economics from the Commercial Academy. He became a reviewer at the Institute for Economic Conjecture (ICE), which had been founded by Academy professor Virgil Madgearu, but, as Rădulescu himself notes, was in reality managed by a PCR comrade, Belu Zilber. He and the "charming man" Zilber maintained a "warm friendship" that lasted into their old age. Rădulescu was kept at the ICE throughout the early stage of World War II (when Romania was still neutral territory). In summer 1940, the eastern region of Bessarabia was seized by the Soviet Union. Rădulescu encouraged Dorina, who (in addition to being targeted by antisemitic laws) feared that she would be arrested by the Romanian authorities, to flee into Soviet territory—which was organized as the Moldavian SSR. She followed his advice and they were separated. Rădulescu remained in Bucharest during the Iron Guard's National Legionary State regime (September 1940–January 1941), which disestablished the ICE immediately after taking power; he reports being shocked when the new authorities condoned Madgearu's assassination. He also witnessed the ultimate clash between the Guardists and Ion Antonescu, or "Legionary Rebellion", noting that its violence "demonstrated what sort of 'new world' was desired by these theoreticians of hatred, of caning, of robbery and assassination."

In March or April 1941, Rădulescu found employment at the Institute of Statistics. In June, with Antonescu's regime prepared to wage war on the Soviets as an ally of Nazi Germany, Rădulescu was mobilized to serve as a Lieutenant in the Land Forces. According to historian Lavinia Betea, on 12 June, he received his orders to prepare for the incoming attack on the region. He opted to cross the Prut River into Bessarabia and surrender to the Soviet Border Troops; he managed to do so, but his account of a Romanian mobilization was written off by the Soviets as an act of provocation, and he was arrested as a spy. As the Romanian–German invasion unfolded, Rădulescu was still not credited for his initiative, and instead was dispatched to prisons further inland. A record from 1952 contrarily suggests that Rădulescu deserted on 22 or 23 June, which was after the invasion had begun, by surrendering to the Red Army. At that junction in his life, Rădulescu noted that he had escaped during the confusion caused by shelling in Coropcăuți, on the Siret River; he had then refused to help the Red Army by performing a suicide mission, and was punished as a result.

Lieutenant Rădulescu ended up in prison camps for Romanian military captives (specifically, in Siberia), where he remained for almost three years. According to his own account of that interval, he volunteered to educate other inmates politically, advancing through their hierarchy from manual laborer to foreman, to camp librarian, and then to camp representative. He was again asked to join the war effort, this time as a Soviet partisan, but he claimed that parachuting was physically impossible for him; this caused suspicion that he was malingering. While being vetted and allowed to join Ana Pauker's "Moscovite" wing of PCR exiles, Rădulescu volunteered for the Tudor Vladimirescu Division (DTV), which was created as a Red-Army unit for Romanian renegade soldiers, and "was afterwards used for the indoctrination of Romanian prisoners in Soviet camps." Some reports suggest that the NKVD actively sought his services as a spy, but do not record whether he was actually recruited. Balas notes that his networking and his ability to befriend Soviet officials ensured that he was initially protected inside the PCR (known in 1948–1965 as the Romanian Workers' Party, or PMR), and that he could treat others with a "mordant wit".

By 1944, the Rădulescus had been reunited, with Dorina (who had lived in Novosibirsk and Alma-Ata) being similarly employed as a DTV propagandist. There are conflicting accounts concerning Gogu's Romanian return: some records suggest that he came back either during the Soviet push of 1944, but he in fact arrived in late 1946, "alongside a batch of prisoners". He resumed his career as an economist in December 1946, when he was co-opted by the Ministry of Industry and Commerce, Foreign Trade Sector. He served as both general director and ministry consultant between 6 February 1947 and 11 May 1948, afterwards being promoted to general secretary of that body. His services were rewarded in 1947, when he was made a Knight of the Star of Romania. His interval in office saw the Romanian monarchy being toppled, and a communist republic proclaimed in its stead. From 29 November 1948, Rădulescu was general secretary of the republican Ministry of Foreign Trade, promoted to Deputy Minister on 15 September 1949; the new government also reconfirmed him as a recipient of the Star of Romania, now as "Star of the People's Republic of Romania, Third Class" (1949). He finally became a member of the PMR on 2 November 1949, and was a recipient of formal training in Marxism-Leninism—the Marxist-Leninist Night School, and then the Political and Leadership University.

=== 1952 fall and 1956 recovery ===
Rădulescu's relationship with PMR General Secretary Gheorghe Gheorghiu-Dej soured in the early 1950s, when the former statistician was sidelined in a purge of Pauker and her followers. He lost his position at the Ministry on 1 July 1952, and was stripped of his party membership in October 1952, branded a "right-wing deviationist". More specifically, he was accused of having conspired with the disgraced Minister of Finance, Vasile Luca, to bring Romania under a localized version of the New Economic Policy, thus "favoring the growth and consolidation of capitalist elements", as a form of economic wrecking. Rădulescu was placed subsequently placed under house arrest, and submitted to formal inquiries. His interrogator was a Securitate Captain, Zalman Marcu, who viewed Rădulescu as part of a "counterrevolutionary" cell, alongside Zilber, Vulpescu, and Aurel Vijoli, making note of their occasional meetings with known or alleged British agents such as Alfred Gardyne de Chastelain and Hugh Seton-Watson. As Tănase writes, Rădulescu was being prepared for a show trial modeled on the Slánský Affair, expecting to be prosecuted alongside Pauker, Luca, Zilber, Teohari Georgescu, and Lucrețiu Pătrășcanu. The need for it was cut short when Stalin died in March 1953; pressure was lifted on Rădulescu and hundreds of others caught up in the fabrication, though Luca and Pătrășcanu still encountered Gheorghiu-Dej's wrath.

In 1952–1954, Rădulescu turned to teaching at his alma mater, which had become the Vladimir Lenin Institute of Economic and Political Research, and also at a commercial high school (the former Krețulescu School). From 1954 to 24 November 1956, he was general director of the Romanian co-operative network (Centrocoop) and, in parallel, of the Romanian Academy Institute of Economics. In September–December 1955, he sent letters to Gheorghiu-Dej and Gheorghe Apostol, effectively appealing for his PMR reinstatement. Balas reports that, in 1956, Rădulescu was visited by Constantinovski, who had relocated to the Soviet Union. The two men reportedly talked about the outcomes of communism, with Constantinovski noting that he no longer believed in its ideals, and advising Rădulescu to stop caring. His other old acquaintance Pandrea, who had been imprisoned and released by the communist regime, and had trouble finding work, asked Rădulescu, through their common friend Geo Bogza, for employment as an academic researcher. As recounted by Pandrea in his since-published diary, Rădulescu shied away from providing assistance, since Pandrea as a one-time "first-rank political figure", was not salvageable. In his notes, Pandrea refers to Rădulescu and Costin Murgescu as lepre ("scum"), and to Rădulescu personally as a "genuine swine of the Mangalica species" (porc sadea, din categoria Mangalița).

Within four years, the onset of De-Stalinization in the Soviet Union also introduced a degree of liberalization in the PMR. Rădulescu was rehabilitated in 1956, and handed his party membership in February 1957. In its resolution, the PMR Control Commission argued that Rădulescu's contacts with Zilber and Vulpescu (as well as Constantinovski) were non-prosecutable offenses, and ruled that the accusation of wrecking had been "exaggerated". Rădulescu took over as titular Minister of Internal Trade on 24 November 1956, serving to February 1957, when he was demoted to Deputy Minister; in 1957, he received the Ordinul Muncii award, Second Class, followed in 1959 by the Order of 23 August, Third Class. He became Minister of Trade during a reshuffle on 17 August 1959, holding this office to 30 April 1962, when he was made Minister of Foreign Trade. On 25 June 1960, he was elected to the PMR's Central Committee, and preserved that seat throughout the Dej years, and down to 22 December 1989. In that context, he became involved in securing Romania's relative independence from the Soviet Union: alongside Alexandru Bârlădeanu, Mircea Malița, Ion Gheorghe Maurer and various others, he established direct links between Dej's regime and the Third World. In April 1959, he attended the 14th session of the United Nations Economic Commission for Europe, being unanimously elected vice chairman of the session—Tommaso Notarangeli was the chairman. In July 1962, Rădulescu was by Gheorghiu-Dej's side at a meeting of the Comecon, in which delegates from the Polish People's Republic suggested full economic integration for the Eastern Bloc; this prompted vocal opposition from the Romanian delegation.

A junior member of the nomenklatura in 1961, Ștefan Andrei recalls that Rădulescu, now trusted because "he had a Jewish wife [and] his mother was a Russian", was being proposed as Minister of Foreign Affairs, but rejected by Gheorghiu-Dej, who reportedly said: "[…] he'd be very good, but he is too ugly. If he's to travel abroad, those people are likely to think that all Romanians are as ugly as that!" Rădulescu was a legislator in the Great National Assembly (MAN) following the March 1961 election, when he took a seat for Timișoara; he returned in March 1965 as a Suceava deputy. His ministerial term ended on October 31, 1963, upon which he was created Deputy Prime Minister of Romania, serving uninterruptedly to March 18, 1975. One of the first missions of his mandate was a 1964 visit to Italy, where he was a guest of Fiat, the automobile manufacturer—part of an accelerated resumption of bilateral trade agreements.

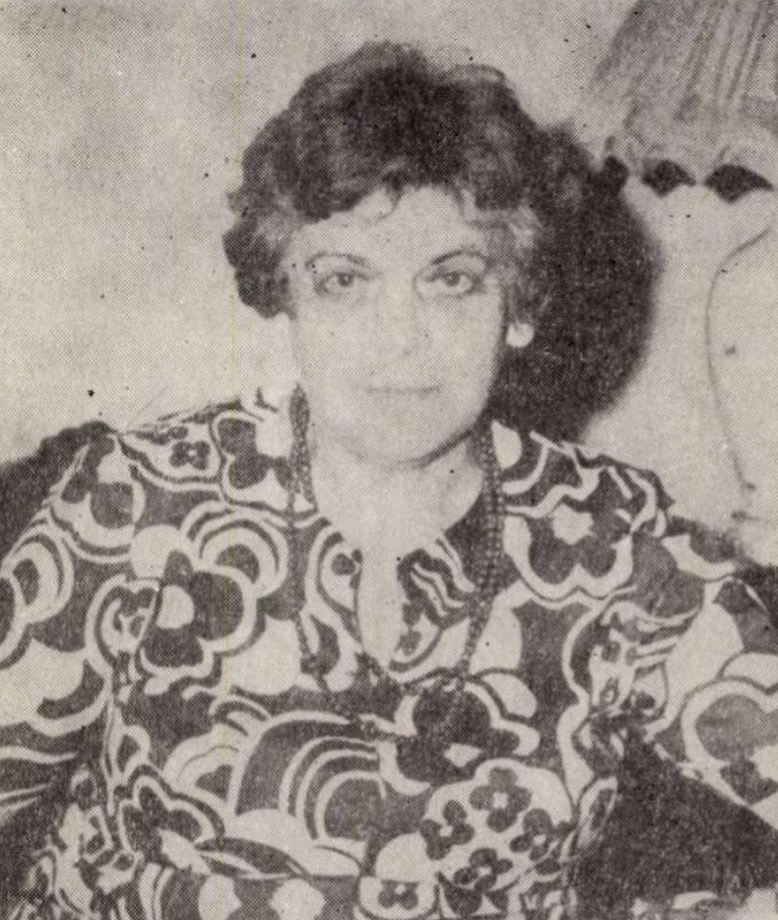
Dorina Rudich-Rădulescu in 1972

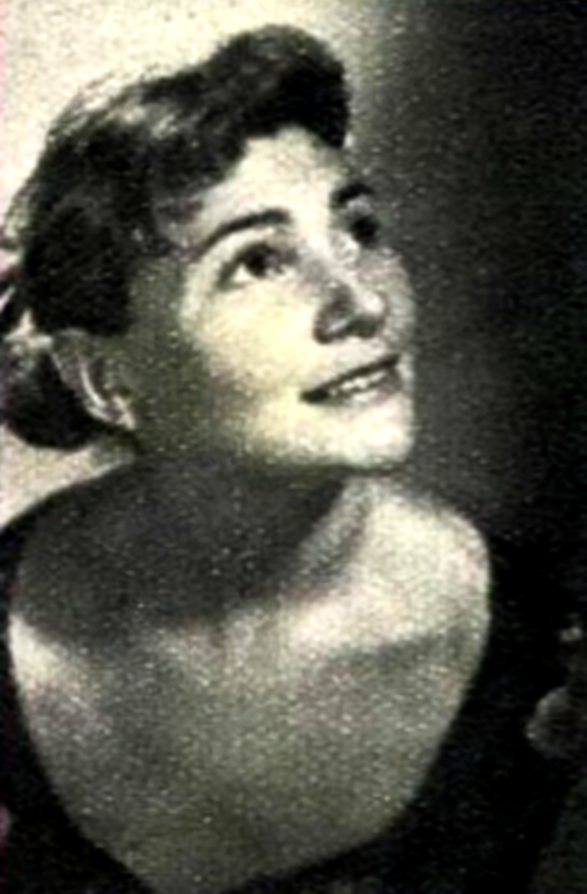
Raluca Sterian in July 1958

Rădulescu remained with Dorina to her death on 21 August 1982. She was an aspiring novelist, and, as literary historian Mircea Zaciu recalls, "Gogu Rădulescu […] was contaminated by his wife's passion, being very much in love with her". From about 1957, he still had an extramarital affair, with the young actress-model Raluca Sterian. She was in a vulnerable position when her father was arrested by the Securitate, and was advised (probably by dramatist Aurel Baranga) to welcome Rădulescu's advances. Theater director Dinu Cernescu, who claims to have befriended the Trade Minister around 1960, notes that Rădulescu was "out chasing tail [when] Mrs Dorina was visiting Paris", and that this is how he embarked on another affair, with Eugenia Marian (widow of novelist Camil Petrescu). Sterian also fell in love with Rădulescu, and was helped in her career, but, as her diaries attest, always felt vulnerable; she was especially embarrassed when the minister took Dorina to one of her swimsuit parades. They were also politically incompatible: she once admonished Rădulescu for having done nothing to help her uncle, the economist Paul Sterian, who had spent eight years in communist prisons.

Around 1960, Gogu arranged for Dorina to read from her work in front of a literary circle at Vălenii de Munte, where his old friend Paraschivescu owned a cottage. The meeting was attended by a young author, Constantin Țoiu, who won Rădulescu's respect and friendship by criticizing his wife's prose. Țoiu records Rădulescu's intelligence and his great admiration for Paraschivescu. In his presence, they engaged in a mock-interview, in which Rădulescu pretended to be a reporter for The New York Times, and bluntly asked Paraschivescu about creative liberties and communist censorship. Țoiu notes: "To all his questions—questions which, should one have answered truthfully, would have resulted in maybe as much as a lifetime of penal servitude, [Paraschivescu] gave shirking answers, both brazen (as if Gogu were truly an American) and terrified. […] Gogu seemed despondent." In a 1961 encounter with sociologist Zigu Ornea, Cuvântul Liber's Tudor Teodorescu-Braniște talked about the "support, above all moral", that Rădulescu was providing, in an effort to have Braniște return to the spotlight.

=== With Ceaușescu ===
Meanwhile, Gogu Rădulescu's biography as a victim of both Soviet imprisonment and Gheorghiu-Dej's intransigence allowed him to reposition himself as an ally of the national-communist faction, which was being formed around Nicolae Ceaușescu, and which took control of the PMR during Gheorghiu-Dej's terminal illness. The official press listed him as one of the party leaders who had stood by Dej during his death on 19 March 1965, and, days after, as accompanying Ceaușescu for his first-ever activities as General Secretary—including a visit to the Romanian Academy. He was granted a seat on the Politburo (Executive Committee) of the newly renamed PCR on 23 July. At the party plenary of 12 August 1965, which brought the sidelining of Dejists such as Gheorghe Apostol and Alexandru Drăghici, he was still assigned a seat of the PCR Central Committee and its Permanent Presidium.

Literary historian Ana Dobre suggests that, though powerful, Rădulescu refrained from offering Paraschivescu "any relevant office", allowing him to endure as a marginal; in return, Paraschivescu lost his respect for Rădulescu, calling him a "bourgeois", addicted to the comforts of the communist upper-class. Rădulescu's affair with Sterian ended in scandal before 1964, when Dorina threatened to demand intervention by the Central Committee; Sterian had a sham marriage with a foreigner, which allowed her to settle abroad (where she eventually remarried, to publisher Jean-Jacques Nathan). Around that time, Dorina arranged for Paraschivescu's play, Asta-i ciudat, to be produced by the Brăila State Theater—inviting literary figures such as Alexandru Piru, Ion Băieșu, Fănuș Neagu and Adrian Păunescu to its premiere. As Piru recalled in 1989: "not pursuing any agenda or ambition of her own, she found great pleasure in […] attending the writers' gatherings."

In that context, Rădulescu assisted Ceaușescu with his international networking: in 1966, he oversaw the first attempt to introduce nuclear power, which included prospecting the international markets. Between 1965 and November 1974, he was Romania's permanent liaison with the Comecon. In September–October 1968, he prospected trade with Latin America by visiting a cluster of countries, from Mexico to Chile; this was followed in 1969 by his goodwill tour of Australia and the ASEAN countries. In February 1970, at Chevereșu Mare, Rădulescu and Romanian Premier Maurer hosted a boar-hunting party for international banker Élie de Rothschild, after which they discussed business in Bucharest. He returned the visit in April, when he was welcomed at the Rothschild holdings in France, including the Château de Ferrières; this prepared the ground for a bilateral meeting between Ceaușescu and French President Georges Pompidou, itself a peak in the Franco–Romanian detente. Largely thanks to Rădulescu, Rothschild capital was involved in financing a Romanian Bank for Foreign Trade, but the investment was phased out when Romanian authorities became dissatisfied with the Rothschilds' interest rate. In late March 1971, Rădulescu led a Romanian delegation to China, in preparation for Ceaușescu's own visit to that country.

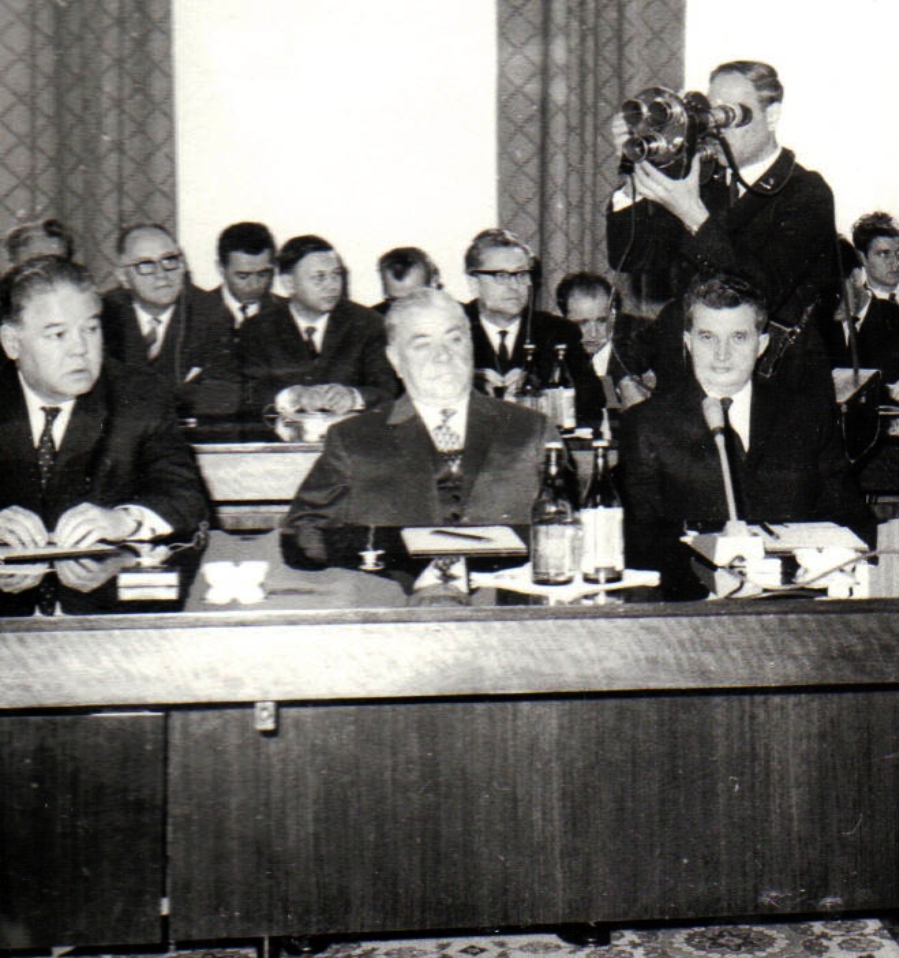
Romanian delegation at the Comecom Summit, Moscow, on 23 April 1969. From the right: Nicolae Ceaușescu, Ion Gheorghe Maurer, Rădulescu

Andrei recounts that Ceaușescu "didn't trust Rădulescu, but needed him." Also according to Andrei, Rădulescu himself "never criticized Ceaușescu during sessions", but, as member of the interwar underground, he could approach the party leader informally, outside meetings, and provide him with notes on the less glamorous aspects of economic life. From 1974, he had to abide by Ceaușescu's orders as President of Romania, namely that all public functionaries use their birth names, and began signing himself as "Gheorghe Rădulescu" (other figures affected were Constantinescu-Iași and Paul Niculescu-Mizil, who used demonyms in their surnames). Rădulescu's ascent was consecrated on 28 November of that year, when he became a member of the reorganized Politburo, or "Executive Political Committee" (CPEx), being the only one of its members to have received a postgraduate education before the onset of communism. He served there uninterruptedly, to 22 December 1989.

Rădulescu was returned to the MAN in the March 1969 and March 1975 elections, both times at Alexandria. He held various other positions in executive or advisory bodies, including as inaugural chairman of the Higher Court of Financial Control (22 May 1973 – 22 December 1989); he is seen by the Court's staff of economists as their founding figure. As argued by scholar Constantin Petrescu, Rădulescu personally invented the institution to ensure his own survival upon Maurer's relative marginalization—and also to provide Ceaușescu with "leverage" over "the structures of party and state."

Rădulescu was again Deputy Prime Minister in 18 March 1975 – 19 March 1979, taking over as Vice President of the Supreme Council of Economic and Social Development (20 March 1979) after which he joined the State Council (2 April 1979 – 22 December 1989). From 25 January 1977, he also served as a member of the CPEx "Permanent Bureau", a 15-member panel which exercised direct control over government bodies; he preserved this position in 1984, when the Bureau membership was slashed to just 8 members. Though critical of what he called (in 1974) "an inflationary phenomenon of decorations", Rădulescu himself accepted a number of high distinctions. In 1964, his membership in the Star of Romania was elevated to First Class (reconfirmed in 1984); he was also received into the Order of Tudor Vladimirescu, First Class (1966), and recognized as a Hero of Socialist Labor in 1971. He also had scholarly recognition, being inducted on the PCR's Academy for Social and Political Studies. He continued to participate in MAN elections: in March 1980, he took a seat for Buzău, and, in March 1985, began his final term, at Găești.

=== Patronage and liberalism ===
At this stage of his life, Rădulescu earned the reputation of a liberal-minded intellectual who protected and sponsored nonconformist writers and visual artists. In 1969, persuaded by his former schoolmate Gellu Naum, Rădulescu bought a vacation home in Comana, south of Bucharest. Here, he was neighbors with Naum, as well as with essayist Romulus Rusan and poet Ana Blandiana. According to literary scholar and memoirist Adrian Marino, both Rusan and Blandiana used their informal connections with Rădulescu to obtain a approval for a stay in the United States, with scholarships provided by the University of Iowa. The Comana villa and another such property, located at Neptun on the Romanian Riviera, were seen as obligatory stops for those who wished to ascend into the national patrimony; especially in old age, Rădulescu additionally hosted intellectuals at his Bucharest home, located in Grivița, near Filantropia Market.

Anti-communist dissident and political scientist Gabriel Andreescu notes that Rădulescu is part of a "Bovaryste" trend in PCR circles of power, with dignitaries who discovered a late passion for the arts. Other examples mentioned by him include Andrei, Cornel Burtică, Ion Iliescu, and Dumitru Popescu-Dumnezeu. Zaciu reports that guests were looking for "a sort of unwinding", and that Rădulescu was a "man of good faith", if "rather conservative when it came to artistic matters". His Soviet imprisonment had shown him "the true face of communism", even though he continued to play the part. A memoir by editor Nicolae Gheran claims that writers were usually discreet about their meetings with the potentate, but that the PCR's cadres and the Securitate were informed in detail, and spread gossip. According to Gheran, Rădulescu's meetings with Ornea were reported on by Lăutari performers, whom "Gogu […] likes to have around to sing him the blues."

Zaciu recounts that while in Comana, Rădulescu made secret gestures to transmit messages critical of the President and of his First Lady, Elena Ceaușescu, possibly because he feared, or knew, that his home had been bugged. The same is recounted by a novelist friend, Augustin Buzura: "he took a whiskey bottle and we climbed up to the attic […]. His house was all-electronic, everything was being recorded—or so he claimed. […] On that first night, he spoke to me about the history of the workers' movement, just about every bit of truth about the workers' movement, about how he had engaged with it […] He wanted me to function as a sort of living memory of his". According to Cernescu: "Gogu Rădulescu was a remarkable man, who had wandered off into a crooked ideology. […] With the passage of time, and especially after Mrs Dorina's death, Gogu had turned into a solitary figure, terrified by all things taking place around him, and, when he had something important to say to me, he would take me to the kitchen, turn on the water, and then whisper whatever he had on his mind."

According to sociologist Vladimir Tismăneanu, Rădulescu feigned dissidence when he was with his artists and writers, to the point of pretending to be drunk so that he and they could be free to mock Ceaușescu; in any other context, however, he was "one of [Ceaușescu's] most servile propagandists", fully endorsing the emerging personality cult. On the leader's 68th birthday (24 January 1986), he contributed a Scînteia article which falsified party records, claiming that he had personally witnessed Ceaușescu leading an "anti-fascist and anti-war rally" in 1939. Betea highlights his role in respect to the other half of the ruling couple: "Elena Ceaușescu treasured him quite a lot for his courteousness, his flattery, his obedience, which he would display whenever given the chance." As noted by poet and memoirist Nicolae Dan Fruntelată, Rădulescu, the communist "bonze", was especially involved in promoting the First Lady, to the point of becoming her "mentor". Fruntelată highlights the contradictions emerging from this positioning: "he brought together in Comana commune, where he owned a villa, all the dissident writers and had them present for colloquiums and for other things I can't be sure of in his grand living-room bed, and then he would head to see 'Comrade Elena' to defend his cubs".

Tismăneanu observes, however, that Rădulescu was genuinely frustrated that his positions remained largely ceremonial, and that Ceaușescu had centralized power beyond any known precedent. In 1979, he and his circle of artistic friends were threatened by Ceaușescu's promise to ban urbanite Romanians from owning homes in the countryside—as Rusan notes, the project was abandoned not by Rădulescu's resistance, but rather because the PCR leadership found out it would also affect miner communities on the Jiu Valley. Essayist Norman Manea noted that the radicalization of national-communism during the late 1970s, which veered into rehabilitating figures previously noted as members of sympathizers of the Iron Guard, was hampered by the high status still maintained by interwar militants such as Rădulescu. At that stage, literary comparatist Gelu Ionescu found that he was unable to publish his monograph on the exile writer Eugène Ionesco, being told by Cartea Românească publishers that Ionesco, an anti-totalitarian, "has the habit of cussing us [Romanians]". He asked Rădulescu's friend and neighbor, the film chronicler Henry Dona, to plead his case. Rădulescu promised to use his influence, and apparently obtained some sympathy for Ionescu—though the book was never published under communism. Rădulescu also tried, but similarly failed, to obtain imprimatur for Zaciu's biographical dictionary of Romanian literature, which included entries not vetted by censorship.

By 1984, the Securitate was monitoring Rădulescu's networking with the Romanian Writers' Union (USR) and its magazine, România Literară—with its editors, George Ivașcu and Nicolae Manolescu, seen as members of the Rădulescu circle of liberals. An informant credited as "Romulus" alleged that Rădulescu's wife, despite being "sub-mediocre" as a writer, had been a "wheeler and dealer" at the USR, and that Gogu himself was describing Manolescu and the others as "my boys". In a 2002 letter discussing Manolescu and his "protectors", poet Alexandru Mușina sees Ivașcu and Rădulescu, both of whom had a background in communist journalism, as essentially belonging to a "left-wing bourgeoisie". They "upheld in the young critic [Manolescu] not just value and competence [,], but also the continuity of a certain spirit that had formed them as well, which they had betrayed (whether voluntarily or otherwise), to emerge as prisoners of their own betrayal."

=== Protochronism and austerity debates ===
In 1977, Rădulescu, alongside Niculescu-Mizil, Leonte Răutu and Ștefan Voitec, served on the preparatory committee for the 15th International Congress of Historical Sciences, which was ultimately held in Bucharest in 1980; Ceaușescu used this venue for popularizing the ideology of "Protochronism"—a belief in the primordial nature of Romanian civilization, linked to the a revisionist history of Ancient Dacia. Over the following years, Rădulescu became a public critic of the Protochronist tenets. On 16 October 1986, România Literară hosted his piece, Profesorii mei de limba și literatura română ("My Teachers of Romanian Language and Literature"), which specifically referred to the interwar thinkers Eugen Lovinescu and Ștefan Zeletin, both of whom had championed Romania's complete Westernization. Profesorii mei was formulated as an attack on Protochronism and the extremes of national-communism. Against this ideology, Rădulescu upheld his version of European values, noting that the Protochronism "dissolves us, a Latin-origin European people, into an amorphous and scattered mass." Literary historian Florin Mihăilescu reads this as a discreetly anti-Soviet discourse, since Rădulescu seemingly argued that isolation from Europe was the same as leaving Romania to be incorporated by a Soviet Empire. The piece endures as controversial because it alleged that the Phrotochronist doyen, Edgar Papu, was covertly participating the far-right's rehabilitation.

According to Fruntelată, România Literară tactically published the Rădulescu piece alongside a praise of Popescu-Dumnezeu, the head of censorship. This persuaded the censors to prevent a Protochronist rebuttal in Luceafărul magazine from even appearing in print. Instead, Profesorii mei was polemically addressed in the diaspora by Iosif Constantin Drăgan, who republished it in a brochure form, alongside answers by Protochronists such as himself, Papu, Mihai Ungheanu, and Dan Zamfirescu. Though identified by this group as a major curb on its influence, Rădulescu's article is seen by Manolescu as a belated contribution to the polemic, which had begun in 1977. Țoiu notes the limits of such liberal stances, claiming that, when he published his novel Căderea în lume in 1987, his friend Rădulescu attempted to have it banned for its less-than-critical take on the Iron Guard. Marino, who was attempting to publish works of exegesis on Mircea Eliade, recounts being frustrated in this attempt by "the old communists, the kind that includes Gogu Rădulescu, […] who were scandalized by [Eliade's] recovery"; Marino confesses that he won unexpected support from the Securitate, which was interested in courting Eliade. An attempt by literary historian Eugen Simion to publish a corpus of Eliade's prose was met with Rădulescu's stiff opposition. According to Simion: "[Eliade] had a great and incorruptible enemy in the Romanian Communist Party leadership, namely Gogu Rădulescu, who was in fact a cultured man, with many sympathies in cultural life. He simply could not forgive Eliade for some statement [Eliade] had made back in the thirties. […] his idiosyncrasies were hardened and nonredeemable." Editor Mircea Handoca also argues that Rădulescu and Ștefan Voicu were personally responsible for maintaining a ban on Eliade's work, only allowing a "brief notice" to appear upon Eliade's death in April 1986.

At that stage, Ceaușescu had imposed a years-long austerity policy, also demanding frugality from the members of his inner circle. According to Andrei, the General Secretary was almost public in his criticism of Rădulescu and Constantin Dăscălescu, who were visibly overweight; Ceaușescu "even said during a CPEx meeting that more people die in Romania from eating too much, than from eating too little." The austerity policy was largely caused by Ceaușescu's efforts to pay off Socialist Romania's foreign debt. The policy was resented by both Andrei and Rădulescu; according to Andrei, US Vice President George H. W. Bush, who visited Romania in 1983, personally met with Rădulescu to offer cheap loans through the Commodity Credit Corporation. Ceaușescu was informed of this, but refused, noting that the loans would have exposed Romania to US interventionism. Rădulescu ultimately folded within the austerity policy and, with his position at the High Court of Financial Control, prevented ministries involved in litigation abroad from paying their lawyers without his approval. This was to the annoyance of Andrei, who had taken over as Minister of Foreign Trade, and who could cover the cost of a class action lawsuit opened in the US against a Romanian state company.

The Comana gatherings were especially alarming for the Securitate whenever they featured Constantinovski, who was again visiting from the Soviet Union, where he had become an enthusiast of the Perestroika—its liberalism being unpalatable to PCR hardliners. In 1985, when poet Nina Cassian left the country to settle in America, Rădulescu preserved her book collection in his attic. In 1989, the Securitate began investigating rumors that, also at Comana, Rădulescu (granted the code name "Marcel") was creating an alliance of Ceaușescu rivals, with Niculescu-Mizil, Andrei, and Ion Dincă as the other participants, readying to take over in a potential regime change. According to Buzura, his friend did not yet believe that communism itself was coming to an end, not even, during November, when Buzura informed him about his personal experience of watching the fall of the Berlin Wall. They engaged in a heated debate: Buzura encouraged him to either withdraw from public life before being overtaken by the coming events, or to publicly engage in resisting Ceaușescu. Buzura notes: "[Rădulescu] yelled at me and said 'you make sure how you go about how you handle yourself, because, if things really are changing, I'll be able to prove for myself what things I have done'. And then he stayed mad." As noted by Tismăneanu, Rădulescu was at the time the only "old-guard" member of the PCR to have still maintained a position of influence; Zaciu also writes that Rădulescu was still useful, if "slightly marginalized", because he still offered Marxist credentials to the PCR, a "party of nationalist-fascist trappings."

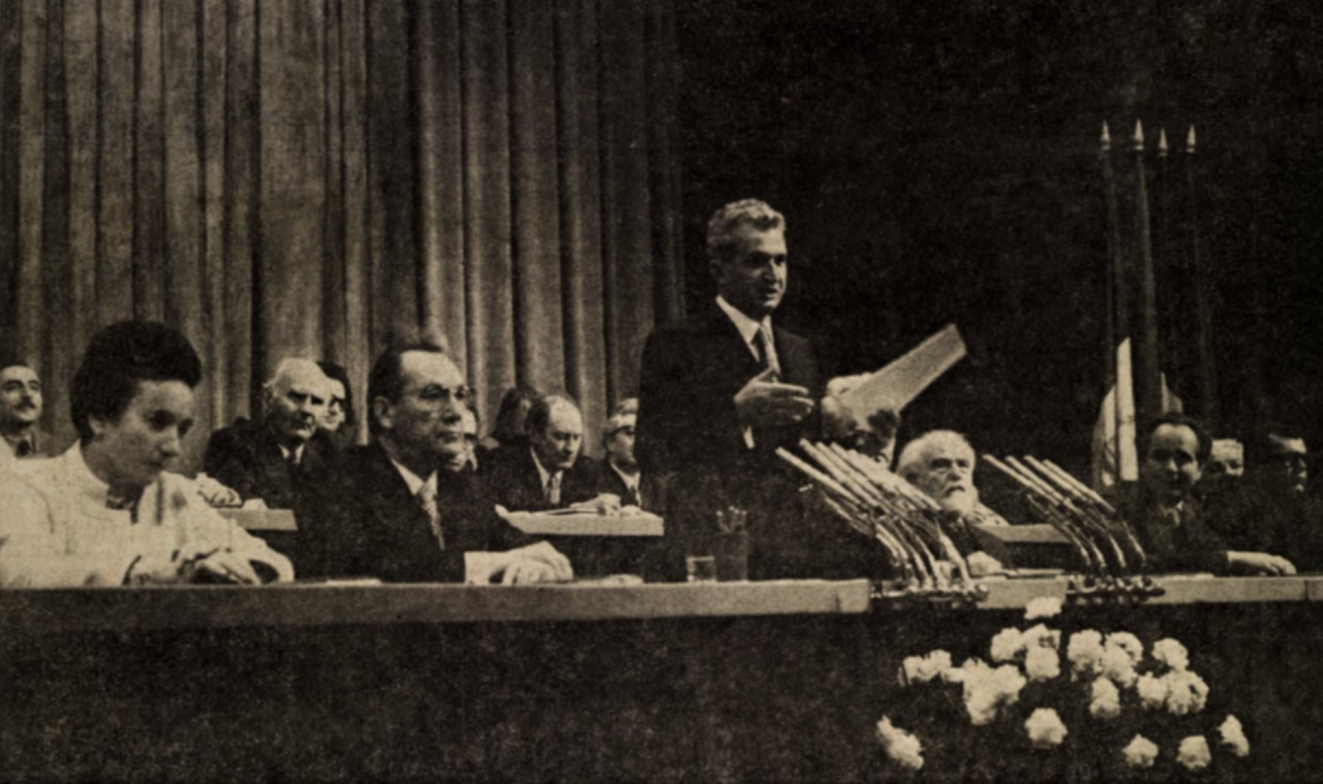
Presidium of the Romanian Writers' Union National Conference of Writers, May 1977. Front row, from the left: Elena Ceaușescu, Manea Mănescu, President Ceaușescu, Ștefan Voitec, Cornel Burtică, Dumitru Popescu-Dumnezeu; Rădulescu is partly visible, between Burtică and Popescu-Dumnezeu

=== Downfall, prosecution, and death ===
Ceaușescu's fall was ultimately sealed by an anti-communist uprising in mid December 1989, which put an end to Rădulescu's remaining political offices. The revolt began as a large-scale protest in Timișoara, which Ceaușescu, preparing to leave for Iran, wanted to quickly repress; during a conference on 17 December, the CPEx was asked to weigh in. According to a sworn testimony provided in 1996 by a junior Committee member, Mihály Gere, Rădulescu and Dăscălescu were part of a minority of members who asked that the protest be dealt with peacefully. Angered by the perceived inaction of his ministers Vasile Milea (National Defense) and Tudor Postelnicu (Internal Affairs), Ceaușescu asked the CPEx to demote them. The events are hard to reconstruct, due to the stenographer present having provided two versions. One is from memory, and suggests that Rădulescu and others stood by Milea, prompting Ceaușescu to threaten resignation until he got his way; the other is done live (but with missing pages), and suggests that Rădulescu and the others more vaguely asked for patience in assessing Milea's case.

On 20 December, after the Romanian Socialist Army had already shot into a crowd of protesters, Rădulescu appeared by Ceaușescu's side during the latter's final address to the Romanian people; those present stood by as Ceaușescu declared martial law. Allegedly, he was a last-minute replacement for Andrei, who had declined participation. Țoiu recalls of his friend's showing on that evening: "he seemed to want to tear himself away, to break out of the screen, to run away in terror, though there was no way he could have. His pampering, alas, had eroded even his flair!" Securitate general Iulian Vlad claims that, on the night of 21–22 December, after the shooting of more protesters in Bucharest, he met with Milea at the Central Committee headquarters, where they discussed seizing power from Ceaușescu; this was hours before Milea, who was reportedly troubled by his role in the massacre, killed himself in mysterious circumstances. Rădulescu was reportedly also present for their encounter, but "dozing off in a chair". Buzura contrarily notes: "on the night of the Revolution, he called me up to apologize."

A violent transition of power, backed by the Army, resulted in the reformist Iliescu and his National Salvation Front (FSN) assuming government and initiating a hunt for Ceaușescu and his wife. Before their capture and execution at Târgoviște, the presidential couple was heard speculating that they owed their demise to "Marcel"—read by Betea as a disguised reference to Rădulescu (a reading in turn described as plausible by Andrei). "During the last week of December 1989", Rădulescu became aware that he would stand trial for his role in the repression. He wrote his last will, appointing Buzura as his executor. Buzura's main task was to obtain and preserve Rădulescu's memoirs. As noted in 1999 by journalist Radu Mareș, it remains unknown whether the manuscript still exists, and if Buzura ever got hold of it. Buzura himself recalls that Rădulescu was in fact arrested by the FSN on the month's next-to-last week, on 23 December, shortly after having attempted to address the revolutionary crowds gathered in the Romanian Television building (and narrowly escaping a lynching). Taken into custody, he was then prepared to stand trial alongside the other CPEx members. Also picked up, Popescu-Dumnezeu recalls reuniting with "Ștefan Andrei and Gogu Rădulescu — both my friends", in the Bucharest office of the general prosecutor. They appeared "relaxed, almost cheerful. But slowly I realized that they were just giving me courage, and under the surface of lightheartedness, a serious restlessness vibrates".

All members of this group subsequently faced trial for the crimes of economic sabotage and genocide; Rădulescu was held in Jilava Prison alongside Niculescu-Mizil, with whom he reminisced about the Gheorghiu-Dej era. Tudor Rădulescu, Gogu and Dorina's adoptive son, was also being investigated by FSN officials in January 1990: he had served as director at the Institute for Scientific Research and Technological Engineering, and had been accused by his colleagues of being an unqualified profiteer. The same month, Rădulescu Sr's arrest prompted a show of protest by thirty-four intellectuals who remembered him mainly as a disinterested protector of their class; signatories included Buzura, Manolescu, Ornea, Rusan, Radu Cosașu, Gabriel Dimisianu, Mircea Dinescu, Dan Grigore, Dan Hăulică, Ion Ianoși, Dan C. Mihăilescu, Alexandru Paleologu, Cristian Popișteanu, and Marin Sorescu. Granted a separate trial from the CPEx lot due to his poor health, Rădulescu had received a 90-day parole before 29 September, when he gave an interview to Adrian Păunescu in Totuși Iubirea magazine. By then, he had been evicted from his domicile, to accommodate General Ion Diamandescu, and had been taken in by another family. As argued by journalist Tudorel Urian, Rădulescu had been "forgotten and avoided by all those to whom he had once extended his hand." Rădulescu himself noted that Buzura, who had been included on the FSN panel, was the only friend who still reciprocated for favors provided during the communist era.

As early as 1981, Rădulescu was being monitored by doctors for coronary artery disease, hypertension, and chronic bronchitis. In October 1990, he checked himself into Berceni's Marinescu Hospital, where he was diagnosed with eight separate conditions. He was heavily sedated and on antidepressants, making him unfit to stand trial. Buzura later clarified that this was a deliberate attempt to make Rădulescu look senile, but that the patient was actually becoming senile due to neglect. Cernescu records that he once drove Rădulescu for another visit to the prosecutor's office, as "the last image I have of him." His trial at Bucharest's military tribunal was suspended indefinitely on 6 December 1990, reportedly after Manolescu and Ornea had obtained a reprieve. Though not Jewish, he was taken in by a nursing home of the Jewish Communities Federation, in Bucureștii Noi; Manolescu and Ornea had arranged for his reception. He died on 24 May 1991 in that facility, while under specialized care; according to Cernescu, he had spent his final days "with his mind gone, deserted by all, not even aware of where he was." It is known that he was survived by his adoptive son and grandson, the latter of whom emigrated to France.

== Legacy ==
A thinly disguised depiction of Gogu Rădulescu as "Gore, a young revolutionary of communist convictions" appears in his wife's 1973 novel Vîrtej ("Whirlwind"); he is also referred to as "my left eye, my right hand, and my left heart entirely" in her 1982 book of poems, Ancora ("The Anchor"). In 2010, a street in Comana had been named after Rădulescu—making him and Milea the only 1980s nomenklatura figures to benefit from such a treatment in post-1989 society. The Higher Court of Financial Control was reestablished in 1992, as Curtea de Conturi, with Ioan Bogdan as its inaugural chairman. Rădulescu's public image and legacy have endured as topics of controversy in the decades after his death. During 1998, a debate between Michael Shafir and Dorin Tudoran aimed to distinguish between philosopher Ion Petrovici, who had served in the Antonescu government, and Rădulescu, as a communist politico. Shafir launched the debate by arguing that the two men were of identically poor quality; this was disputed by Tudoran, who viewed Petrovici as more honorable, and who noted that Shafir had previously commended Rădulescu for his anti-fascism. Revisiting the issue in 2002, poet and critic Gheorghe Grigurcu noted: "We have every reason to believe that the regime tolerated, even encouraged, an 'opposition of the coffeehouses', a neutered 'dissidence', which was obviously of little use, but which 'made us look good' abroad as evidence of our 'democracy', and appeared internally as a vent for grievances that were spinning out control. Represented by characters with a first-rate "socialist-realist" past, including the likes of Eugen Jebeleanu, Geo Bogza, Marin Preda (not by chance were they joined by high-ranking activists such as George Macovescu and Gogu Rădulescu), such 'opposition' was designed as a substitute for true resistance, a nechezol to its coffee."

In 2003, Buzura presented his take on Rădulescu's moral biography with a book of memoirs, Tentația risipirii. Urian praised the work as an act of justice: "That Augustin Buzura has invested himself in such an act of decency, one which will bring him no profit, is yet again proof that the writer is a man of quality." Published the same year, Gelu Ionescu's memoirs offered a contrasting take. He sees Rădulescu as "one of the most cynical functionaries that the party could muster [...]. This nonentity—whose one merit was getting beaten up by the Guardists for being a communist—had been cultivating scores of genuine writers [...], calling them up to his table as if in some sort of 'court', and helping them to solve, on and off, this and that issue that never threatened his own privilege and the party-and-state hierarchy; all this for the sake of an ideal 'leftism', long-since buried under the manure of communist-Ceaușescuist totalitarianism". In a 2005 article, Betea noted: "[Rădulescu] has been rewarded by those of his guests who were not initiated into how they should read his biography with the reputation (still kept alive today!) of an 'enlightened activist', a protector of writers, essayists, singers and actors alike." In 2012, poet Florin Iaru, who had not been a Comana visitor, replicated the positive view of his peers: "Gogu Rădulescu was the only slightly luminous figure among the leaders of socialist Romania, the only one to have extended some protection to the writers."

Other controversies focus on the allegedly covert nature of Comana gatherings and Rădulescu's putative influence over the pre- and post-revolutionary regimes. In the decade after poet Nichita Stănescu's death, his mother Maria grew convinced that the Comana circle had fostered the intention of controlling her son. She claims that Dora Tărâță, who seduced Nichita and became his second wife, was planted into his entourage by Rădulescu. In January 1993, the Romanian newspaper of record, România Liberă, hosted an opinion signed as "R. M.", which stated as a fact that Rădulescu had used his influence with Ceaușescu in order to accelerate the Revolution's outcome—namely, that it was he who talked Ceaușescu into organizing an ill-fated "people's rally" of 21 December, in which almost 100 thousand workers were mustered only to watch him panic. The article further claimed that a "foreign power", presumably the Soviet Union, had mandated Rădulescu to do so. Researcher Richard Andrew Hall disputes this theory, noting that Ceaușescu most likely wanted to have the rally, and that the CPEx would not contradict him.

According to Betea, the Comana surveillance records have been removed from the Securitate archives, as part of a "cleanup" operation carried out at some point before 2010; literary historian Maria-Ana Tupan also argues that, by 2015, some recordings of Ceaușescu's martial-law speech had been digitally altered to have Rădulescu removed from the background. With recollections published in 2013–2014, Fruntelată revisited the Protochonist affair, arguing that Rădulescu's assessment of the intellectual trend was mendacious, especially by implying that Protochronism was antisemitic. In his view, "Saint Gogu" was primarily an intriguer, whose circle of influence was the Romanian equivalent of Propaganda Due, and who had "rehearsed methods of political and literary combat" that were eventually used by the FSN, in lieu of an ideology. In 2016, Lumea magazine put out a piece by General Aurel Rogojan, who declared his own support for Protochronism and identified Rădulescu as an agent of the Communist International, who had managed to escape being purged by the national-communists, and whose "Comana cell" of "Jewish intellectuals" was a vehicle for proletarian internationalism. Such claims were rejected by Manolescu, who noted their various inaccuracies and overall "whiff of antisemitism".
