= 1985 Romanian parliamentary election =

- 17 March 1985

All 369 seats in the Great National Assembly
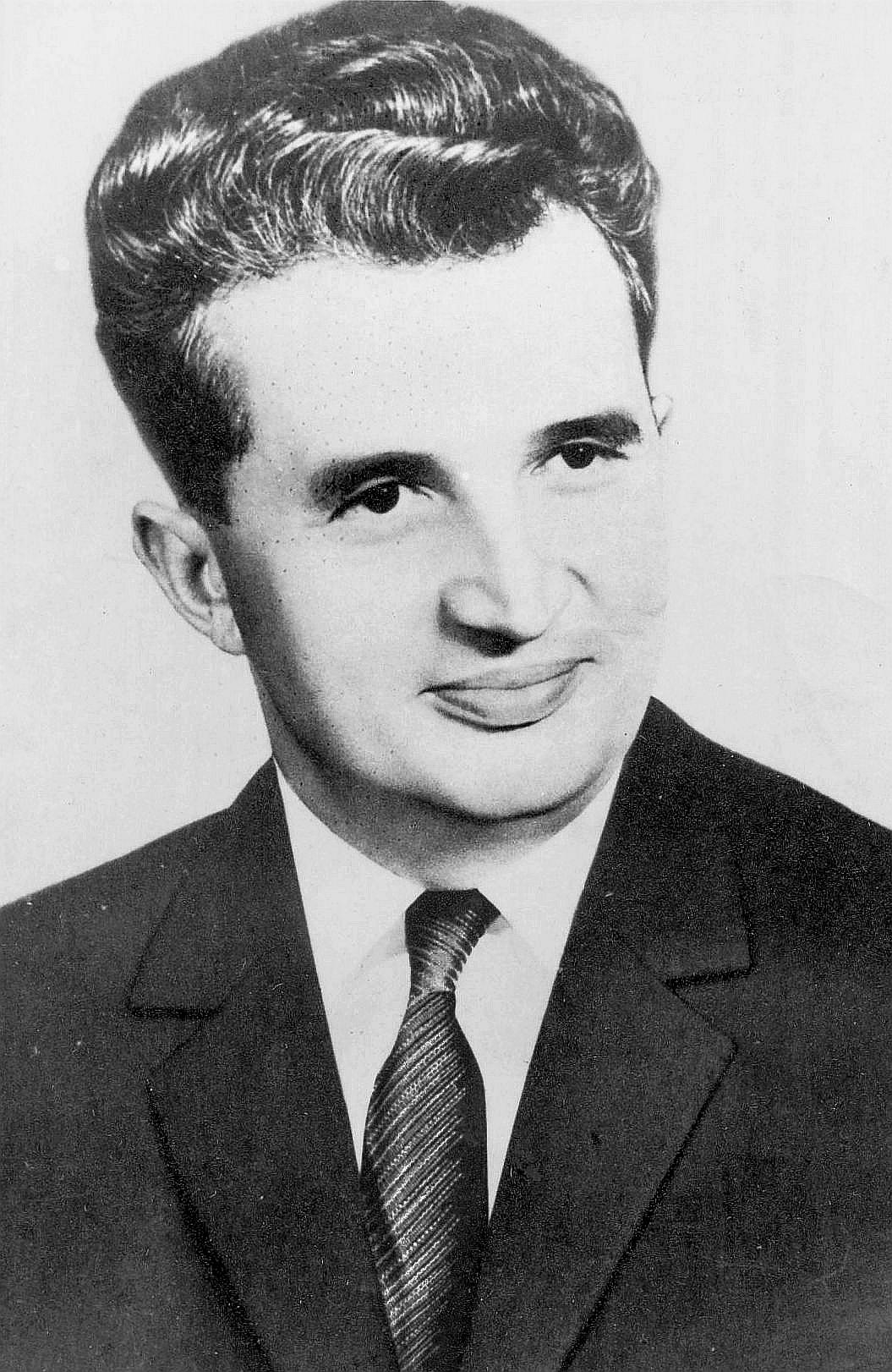
	First party
Leader	Nicolae Ceaușescu
Party	PCR
Alliance	FDUS
Seats won	369
Seat change	Steady
Popular vote	15,375,522
Percentage	97.73%
Prime Minister before election
Constantin Dăscălescu
PCR
Elected Prime Minister
Constantin Dăscălescu
PCR

Parliamentary elections were held in Romania on 17 March 1985. The Front of Socialist Unity and Democracy (FDUS), dominated by the Romanian Communist Party (PCR) and including other mass organisations, was the only group to contest the elections, and no prospective candidate could run for office without the Front's approval. Consequently, FDUS candidates won all 369 seats in the Great National Assembly, also ensuring the rubber-stamp confirmation of Nicolae Ceaușescu as President of Romania. The Assembly which elected him included several members of the Ceaușescu family, namely his wife Elena, son Nicu, and brother Ilie. Continuity was also ensured by other incumbents, including Nicolae Giosan as Assembly chairman and Constantin Dăscălescu as Prime Minister.

These elections also widened the contrast between Romania and other countries of the Eastern Bloc, since the Soviet Union embraced liberalisation during the same year. Ceaușescu was by then widely unpopular due to his policy of cutting down on consumer supplies, which served his project of repaying the foreign debt. Popular discontent was contrasted by a massive PCR recruitment drive, as well as by the official approval of gender equality, which saw 30% of Assembly seats going to women. The communists' full hold on power was contested by an underground National Peasants' Party (PNȚ), with Ion Puiu trying and failing to present himself as an opposition candidate. Protests by Romanian dissidents continued over the subsequent Assembly term, reaching an early peak with the Brașov rebellion of 1987.

The 1985 parliament was the last single-party one to be held nationally in Romania. The 1985 vote was followed by an early election for the Assembly seats of Tulcea County in 1987, which produced more signals of a coming unrest. The elected parliament never completed its five-year term, as the Communist Party (PCR) was finally defeated and dissolved during the Romanian Revolution of 1989. The presidential couple was tried and executed during the events, while some members of the parliament and cabinet were singled out for their crimes and all spent time in prison, where Giosan died. Other former Assembly members were recovered in post-1989 politics, including Ilie Verdeț, who established a Socialist Party of Labour (PSM).

== Background ==
The election took place during the regime's effort to conceal its non-democratic nature by a massive recruitment into the PCR. As summarised by journalist Alexander Clapp: "The fusion of party and state came to resemble the substitution of the state by the party, which expanded beyond all proportion: by 1985 its membership was approaching some four million—one in four adults, one in three working Romanians, the largest political party per population in the world." The PCR also officially endorsed a drive for more gender equality, which increased the proportion of female party members to 23%. Women were also 35% of successful candidates in 1985.

Such gender quotas are dismissed by researchers as a facade. Historian Zoe Petre links them to national communism and to "Ceaușescu's personal phantasms", wherein "quantitative quotas of 'female comrades' were imposed on all party and state organs." In practice, they were assigned mainly to "propaganda work", and as such preserved stereotypes about "chatty women". Similarly, political scientist Ionela Băluță finds that, among this class of female communists, "real power" could be exercised only by Elena Ceaușescu, the president's wife, and by a few other members of the Ceaușescu family. Overall, "the high percentages of women in other political structures are not indicative of their participation in decision making." According to political sociologist Emanuela Simona Gârboni, all political decisions rested with PCR males. "Encouraged and sometimes even coerced", women candidates were often unsuited for the task, meaning that "women politicians were seen as the symbol of an aggressively pursued communist propaganda."

Within the communist system, the FDUS was an organism tasked with vetting all candidacies; it was chaired by Ceaușescu, who was both national president and PCR general secretary. Under the 1965 Constitution which established a socialist republic, electoral freedoms were nominally ensured, but "the right to nominate candidates belonged to the PCR, as well as to all labor unions, cooperatives, youth and women's leagues, cultural associations, and other mass organisations." As surmised by sociologist Mircea Kivu, the leaders of the main religious organisations were also included on the ballot, being automatically awarded parliamentary seats. Created on this basis, the FDUS, described by Kivu as "something like an enlarged Communist Party", also nominated the Central Electoral Commission and counted the votes.

Candidates were elected in single-member constituencies, and had to receive over 50% of the vote. If no candidate passed this threshold, or if voter turnout in the constituency was less than 50%, re-runs were held until the requirements were met. Under "internal democracy" laws passed in 1972–1974, several candidates could compete over one seat, though some precincts still presented only one candidate. The most common formula involved two FDUS candidates running against each other. Participants only had the option of voting against all or any of the candidates. This was done by crossing out the name of the candidate, or any of the names on a closed list; crossing out all names was an effective blank ballot. By contrast, leaving all names intact was interpreted as an approval of all candidates, and as such a valid vote. As argued by Kivu, the expectation from a committed communist voter was that they never enter the voting booth, but submit a ballot upon receiving it; the same author notes that, while members of the commission were "somewhat suspicious" of those who did enter the booth, these were never reprimanded. The more common form of protest from those who took the risk was writing in slogans or obscenities. According to Kivu, the counting of ballots in the preceding election of 1980 mostly meant separating valid, blank, and defaced ballots.

1985 marked a slump in the regime national and international prestige. It inaugurated massive cuts in consumer supply and saw Ceaușescu's positioning as an anti-Soviet asset threatened by the rise of Mikhail Gorbachev. Constantin Dăscălescu had replaced Ilie Verdeț as Prime Minister in May 1982 (and continued to head the PCR cabinet to 1989). This change of course was ordered by Ceaușescu, reportedly because Verdeț had sought to prevent the rationing of bread, or more generally because he would not immediately enforce the president's various commands. Dăscălescu's loyalty was tested in 1983, when, like Ceaușescu himself, he refused to recognize that design flaws at Teleajen Refinery had caused the death of 28 employees. Meanwhile, his civilian ministries were being kept in check by Romania's intelligence agency, the Securitate, which, in 1984, demoted a head of the Religious Affairs Department, Ion Roșianu, who was allegedly trafficking in influence.

The communist status quo was being challenged by underground opposition forces, some of whom were grouped into the National Peasants' Party (PNȚ). Engineer Ion Puiu "issued a comprehensive political platform" for the PNȚ, calling on the PCR to respect constitutional guarantees and renounce its position as the vanguard party. He then attempted to present himself as a candidate in the election, which led to his arrest by authorities. Other figures associated with the group had been placed under constant Securitate surveillance. In April 1985, Securitate informant Iosif Constantin Drăgan reported that Corneliu Coposu viewed the election as "masterminded and falsified", noting that FDUS candidates in Sălaj County had received only positive votes. Werner Somerauer, a Saxon photographer and pipefitter, also protested the election in Brașov County by stealing ballots which he preserved as "historical documents". This involved stuffing an urn with papers marked: Dați-ne mai multă carne! ("Let us have more meat!").

== Results ==
Party	Votes	%	Seats
Front of Socialist Unity and Democracy	15,375,522	97.73	369
Against	356,573	2.27	–
Total	15,732,095	100.00	369
Valid votes	15,732,095	100.00	
Invalid/blank votes	0	0.00	
Total votes	15,732,095	100.00	
Registered voters/turnout	15,733,060	99.99	
Source: Nohlen & Stöver

=== Individual seats ===
A list of all elected deputies was announced on 1 April. Among the reconfirmed deputies was Nicolae Ceaușescu himself: he began his last term for 23 August, a Bucharest borough, where he had served since 1969. This category also includes his wife Elena, who began her third-consecutive (and last) term representing Pitești. Her and Nicolae's son, Nicu Ceaușescu, was reelected for the first and final time in Râmnicu Sărat. Upon reelection, he renounced his position as Assembly secretary. Agronomist Nicolae Giosan was the Assembly chairman, having served continuously in that post since July 1974. According to novelist and fellow deputy Dumitru Popescu-Dumnezeu, Giosan owed his political career to Ceaușescu, who "landed him at the Great National Assembly rostrum".

Some party dignitaries also served renewed terms, but switched constituencies. Chairman Giosan had served in the 1980 parliament as the envoy for Căzănești, but was now sent to the Assembly by the voters of Adjud. Dăscălescu moved his constituency between two neighborhoods of Brașov, while his rival Verdeț, who only returned to a ministerial position in October 1985, lost his seat at Cluj-Napoca and became instead deputy for Bacău County. Tudor Postelnicu, who was leader of the Securitate, was reconfirmed as deputy in Videle, having previously held a seat at Băicoi.

Other examples include Deputy Premiers Ștefan Andrei (moving from Horezu to Videle), Alexandrina Găinușe (from Comănești to Oltenița), Ioan Totu (from Dragalina to Dumbrăveni), Ioan Avram (from Bucharest to Ploiești), Ioan C. Petre (from Măcin to Olt County), and Ion Dincă (from Balș to Medgidia); ministers Neculai Agachi, Emil Bobu, George Homoștean, Ion Pățan, Petre Preoteasa, Eugen Proca, Vasile Pungan, Ion Teoreanu, and Richard Gheorghe Winter began terms in Târgoviște, Craiova, Bicaz, Fălticeni, Cluj-Napoca, Lugoj, Tractorul-Brașov, Târnăveni and Negrești, respectively. Likewise, Ilie Ceaușescu took a new seat in Moreni, and engineer Suzana Gâdea moved to Piatra Neamț. Agriculturalist Vasile Bărbulescu, who was married to one of Ceaușescu's sisters, moved from Scornicești to Drăgănești-Olt.

The party's economists Gogu Rădulescu and Ilie Văduva also changed constituencies. Rădulescu left Buzău and reemerged as the deputy for Găești, while Văduva changed precincts in Dorobanți. A senior PCR journalist, Ion Popescu-Puțuri left a seat in Călugăreni for a position in Titulescu quarter, Bucharest. Popescu-Dumnezeu and fellow novelist Ion Brad similarly changed seats—the former moved from Iași to Reghin, while the latter left Vatra Dornei for Răcari; another author, Dumitru Radu Popescu, became a Constanța deputy after having previously served in Lechința.

While serving as deputy Premier (to October 1987), Petre Gheorghe returned to then Assembly after a ten-year hiatus, taking a seat for Bucharest. Several junior members of the high-ranking nomenklatura also took seats, with some serving their first term in the Assembly. This was the case for deputy Premiers Dimitrie Ancuța (at Deva) and Nicolae M. Ion (at Curtea de Argeș), for Timber Industry Minister Gheorghe Constantinescu (at Siret), as well as for Dumitru Alecu, elected at Novaci, who became Assembly secretary. Securitate general Iulian Vlad also debuted in the Assembly for Domnești, while philosopher Dumitru Ghișe became a first-time deputy at Iași. New female deputies included physician Veronica Ciobăneanu (elected at Adamclisi, she became Romania's head delegate to the Inter-Parliamentary Union) and trade unionist Lina Ciobanu (elected at 1 Mai, Bucharest). Also elected for the first time, in Buzău County, Maria Lazăr was sworn in as the Assembly's vice president.

== Aftermath ==
=== Incomplete term ===
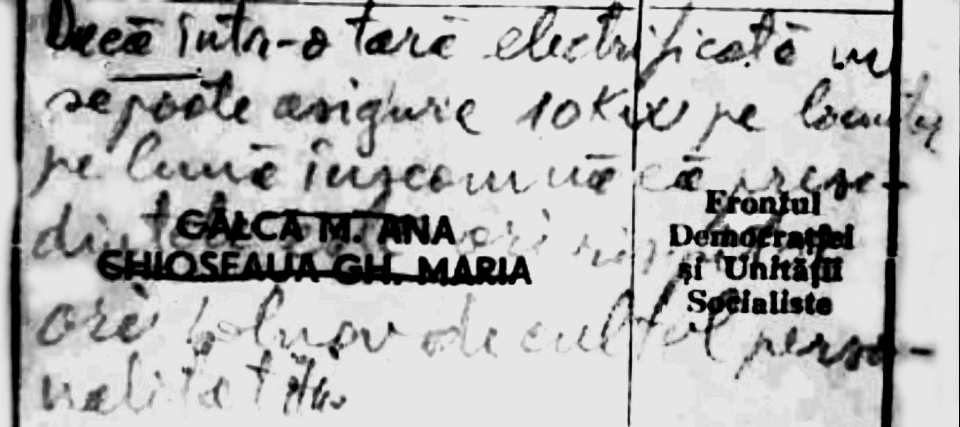
Protest ballot cast in the early elections of Tulcea County, November 1987. Both candidates' names are crossed out, with handwritten text added: "If an electrified country cannot ensure 10 kilowatts a month per inhabitant, then it follows that its president is either a [illegible] or driven mad by the cult of personality"

The parliament reconfirmed Nicolae Ceaușescu as president, following a motion submitted by FDUS vice president (and Timișoara deputy) Manea Mănescu. Official communiques noted that support for the candidacy was "unanimous and enthusiastic", with Ceaușescu seen as "the most beloved son of the Romanian people". Propaganda also referred to his reelection as a "sure guarantee for pursuing the magnificent program of creating a multilaterally developed socialist society and of advancing Romania toward communism." As noted by Coposu, voting was a show of hands, and chairman Giosan never allowed delegates to vote against the incumbent. Mircea Kivu believes government recognised that there had been a relative drop in support for the FDUS, from 98.5% in 1980, to 97.7% in 1985, which allegedly prompted it to modify the 1974 electoral law, and submit new rules for the Assembly election of 1990.

Dăscălescu's cabinet had an unusually long lifespan by Ceaușescu-era standards, which, historian Adrian Cioroianu believes, underscores the fact that the Prime Minister, alongside ministers Bobu and Rădulescu, was a Ceaușescu favorite. Silviu Brucan, the communist-turned-dissident, viewed Dăscălescu as a prototype of the "servile politician". A government reshuffle only occurred in July 1988, when Văduva was sacked from the Foreign Trade Ministry and Dăscălescu threatened with demotion. Like previous government reshuffles, this rested on Ceaușescu's dissatisfaction with his ministers. In this case, the issue was with Văduva's agreement to import and store chemical waste at Sulina.

The regime continued to lose endorsements from regular Romanians, as it persisted with cutbacks, with Ceaușescu insisting on spending all available state funds on repaying the foreign debt. Upon reducing central heating in 1986, he lectured the PCR Central Committee: "there's no shame in us wearing sweaters inside the house, especially at night". Interest in Soviet liberalisation, as expressed in the Soviet policies of Glasnost and Perestroika, was maintained by Radio Moscow, which expanded its news coverage in Romanian. Over those months, local intellectuals became enthusiastic about the: as reported by a Securitate informant in 1985, Romanian writers hoped that Gorbachev would bring his liberalisation to Romania to reintroduce "modesty in public life" and eliminate censorship.

Later in 1985, a Romanian Democratic Action was founded by 13 pseudonymous activists, who began monitoring the regime's record on ecology while also expressing full support for Perestroika. At that stage, the authorities clamped down on dissent by ordering the arrest and killing of engineer Gheorghe Ursu, who was keeping a diary critical of Ceaușescu. As noted by political historians Cristina and Dragoș Petrescu: "The 'Ursu case' deepened the conviction that all those who dared to express such views would end in the same way. However, this was just an extreme case since none of the radical dissidents of the 1970s and the 1980s died in prison or during interrogation." The PNȚ remained active internally and, in February 1987, Coposu obtained its recognition by, and admission into, the Christian Democrat World Union. Puiu was rearrested in May 1987, after attempting to send Gorbachev a memorandum, but the Securitate was unable to prevent other protest documents from being circulated at home and abroad.

The Brașov rebellion, which erupted that November, was probably caused by Dăscălescu's decision to punish workers at Steagul Roșu for design flaws attributable to poor management. It resulted in large-scale repression, with the arrest of dissenting workers; hundreds were interrogated, and 62, including Somerauer, were deported to various locations in Romania. During the final days of that year, the Securitate detained Gabriel Andreescu, who championed human rights in opposition to the regime, and held him until January 1988. Also in November, there were early elections in Tulcea County, which witnessed a resumption of critical and obscene messages on ballots. One anonymous voter suggested that Ceaușescu's approval of power cuts showed that he was mentally ill, and therefore ineligible, while another warned of a coming revolt.

=== Revolution ===
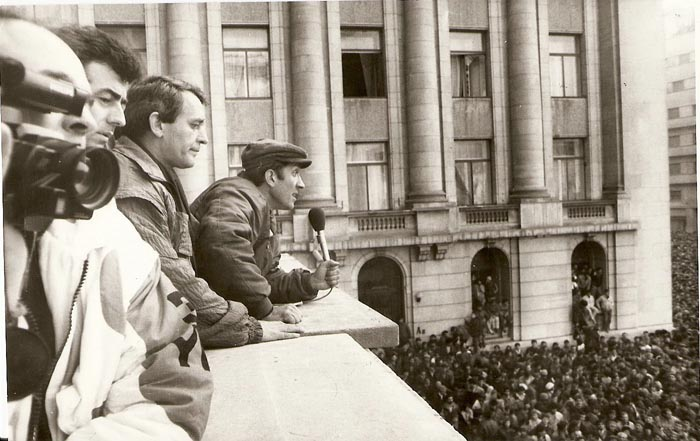
Revolutionary Mircea Diaconu addressing the crowds upon the seizure of power in December 1989

Although the anti-communist movement had been suppressed during and after the election, the 1985 parliament was the last to be voted in under a single-party system. On 12 December 1989, the PCR Central Committee set the date for new elections as 11 March 1990. The Romanian Revolution, erupting five days after the resolution, began as a confrontation with the Romanian Army and Securitate, which fired on unarmed crowds. Ceaușescu threatened to resign when his orders were not fully carried out, but Premier Dăscălescu persuaded him not to leave office. Dincă organised a cover-up effort at Timișoara, sending in 20,000 Patriotic Guards. On 20 December, Dăscălescu joined him there and attempted to negotiate the regime's political survival by meeting with a revolutionary delegation; when his outreach effort failed, he supported renewed violence.

The uprising eventually succeeded in toppling the regime on 21–22 December. Nicu Ceaușescu was captured early on and survived a stabbing. His uncle Ilie, who regarded the regime's clampdown as ineffective, attempted to form an emergency cabinet with Soviet support, but was ignored. Nicolae and Elena fled Bucharest during a revolutionary siege on the Central Committee. Dăscălescu was assigned by them to lead a reduced version of the Central Committee, but opted out. Upon surrendering to the revolutionaries, he decreed a political amnesty, then proclaimed his cabinet dissolved. A new cabinet, headed by deputies Verdeț and Vlad, was accepted by some of the revolutionaries, but rejected by the masses, and dissolved within 20 minutes.

On 25 December, marking the accession to power of the National Salvation Front (FSN), Nicolae and Elena Ceaușescu were swiftly tried and executed. As noted by academic Alexandra Ionescu, the FSN leadership regarded itself as a legal and symbolic legatee of the FDUS, in that it claimed to regroup "all the country's sane forces"; she views the FSN Council as having a "list of attributes that was nearly identical to that of the Great National Assembly." On 27 December the FSN leader, Ion Iliescu, supported the notion of leaving future elections to be managed by the Front, in order to promote "the ideas of unity and their continued realization." The FSN allowed other parties to organize—including the PNȚ, reemerging as the Christian Democratic National Peasants' Party; however, as Ionescu notes, the legalistic culture encouraged by the FSN viewed them as tolerated and second-rank forces. This trend was questioned by the opposition and overturned by electoral laws which established more equality between the competing groups, with the FSN emerging as a political party.

Multi-party elections for the new Parliament of Romania were eventually held on 20 May 1990. As reported by three historians of the period, Iliescu's presidential campaign preserved some core elements of 1980s precedents, also developing into a "personality cult" with Iliescu as a stand-in for Ceaușescu. Both Iliescu and the FSN came out as victorious. There still was a continuity between the two parliaments, in that the majority of 1990 deputies had been PCR members. As many as 15% had belonged to its nomenklatura, and 10% had been Assembly deputies at various moments; like new arrivals, these were mostly males, with women representing only 5% of Romania's post-communist parliament.

Some of the major figures in the previous parliament had by then been arrested. Nicu Ceaușescu was found guilty of genocide, but appealed and only served a full term for unlawful gun possession. Bobu, Dincă, Mănescu and Postelnicu were tried together, and also found guilty of genocide. While Dincă, Postelnicu and Bobu's complicity is proven, the verdict as applied to Mănescu is widely regarded as spurious, including by anti-communists. All defendants initially received life sentences, but had them commuted in 1993, when the genocide convictions were also replaced with aggravated murder or accessory to murder. Also sentenced in that context, Dăscălescu was released on medical grounds in 1995. Bobu and Dincă were conditionally released in the early 1990s, and Postelnicu followed suit in 1999.

Ilie Ceaușescu lost his position in the Army and investigated, but never tried, for instigation to first-degree murder. Giosan had died in mysterious circumstances while his case was being investigated. Both Popescu-Dumnezeu and Teodor Mărieș, who were held with Giosan at Jilava Prison, argue that he was in fact murdered as punishment for his political past. President Iliescu issued pardons for Vlad, in 1993, and for Popescu-Dumnezeu, in 1994. Another such pardon applied to Homoștean, who was serving time for having ordered an extrajudicial killing in 1981. At the time of his death in 2016, he was under investigation for his alleged role in Ursu's murder.

In November 1990, Verdeț founded a far-left group called Socialist Party of Labour (PSM), which was joined by poet Adrian Păunescu. It won 18 parliamentary seats during the election of 1992, when it emerged as a crucial backer of the Nicolae Văcăroiu cabinet, ensuring that market liberalisation was stalled. Verdeț's party faded into political insignificance during the next electoral cycle. Maria Lazăr pursued a career in post-communist politics, joining the PSM and then the Social Democrats. She took a Chamber seat in the November 2000 election. Dăscălescu's aides Șerban Mihăilescu and Ghiorghi Prisăcaru also embraced careers within Iliescu's Party of Social Democracy.
