= Ernst Breitenstein =

Ernst Breitenstein (born March 23, 1923, Sibiu, died May 20, 1990, Bucharest) was an ethnic German journalist and politician in Romania. He had Saxon-Jewish origins. Breitenstein joined the Communist Party of Romania in 1939. Between 1944-1949 he edited the Sibiu pro-communist publication România viitoare under the pen name Cornel Petraru.

In 1949 he became the founding editor-in-chief of Neuer Weg, a German-language daily published from Bucharest. In 1954 he was replaced by Anton Breitenhofer as editor-in-chief. In October 1957 Breitenstein became the first journalist from Romania to visit the Federal Republic of Germany.

In February 1970 Breitenstein was named Assistant Editor-in-Chief of Neuer Weg. In 1971 he was included in the Romanian Radio-TV Council. In the same year he was named as a member of the board of directors of the Executive Bureau (1978), a member of the board of directors of the Ștefan Gheorghiu Academy.

In 1975 he became a member of the Great National Assembly. He sat in the assembly until 1980, and was again elected for the 1985-1989 term. He became editor of the publication Era Socialista in 1975. In November 1976 Breitenstein returned as editor-in-chief of Neuer Weg, serving in that function until 1989. At the 13th Party Congress, held in 1979, he was elected as an alternate member of the Central Committee of the Romanian Communist Party. He remained an alternate member until 1989. He was also the vice chairman of the Council of Working People of German Nationality. Notably he replaced Breitenhofer both in the functions as Editor-in-Chief of the newspaper and as vice chairman of the Council of Working People.
