= Alexandru Romalo =

Alexandru Romalo may refer to

- Alexandru Romalo (diplomat) (1892–1947), Romanian diplomat, economist and politician
- Alexandru Romalo (judge) (1819–1875), Moldavian-born Romanian judge
