= Inflation in Romania =

Inflation in Romania was a major issue during the 1990s, when the yearly inflation reached a peak of 256% in 1993. Since then, the inflation has slowly decreased, reaching a period of deflation in 2015.

Year	Inflation rate
1970s	
1980s	
1990	5.1%
1991	170.2%
1992	210.4%
1993	256.1%
1994	136.7%
1995	32.3%
1996	38.8%
1997	154.8%
1998	59.1%
1999	45.8%
2000	45.7%
2001	34.5%
2002	22.5%
2003	15.3%
2004	11.9%
2005	9.0%
2006	6.6%
2007	4.8%
2008	7.9%
2009	5.6%
2010	6.1%
2011	5.8%
2012	3.3%
2013	4.0%
2014	1.1%
2015	-0.6%
2016	-1.5%
2017	1.3%
2018	4.6%
2019	3.8%
2020	2.6%
2021	5.1%

For most of the Socialist era, inflation was relatively low, due to the centrally planned economy. Exceptions were at the beginning of the 1980s austerity policy in Romania, when prices were risen in order to reduce consumption and allow the government to pay back the foreign debt.

Following the onset of liberal economic reforms in November 1990, as prices and exchange rates were gradually liberalized, inflation began to rise. The inflation went down due to the economic growth, but in 1997, following the elimination of subsidies, a new inflation bout occurred.
