= Anton Breitenhofer =

Anton Breitenhofer (10 April 1912 in Reșița – 20 December 1989 in Bucharest) was a Danube Swabian (ethnic German) journalist, writer and politician in Romania. Breitenhofer spent his youth working as a locksmith in Reșița during twenty-two years. He became a member of the Communist Party of Romania during the initial phase of the Second World War. After the war he spent time in the Soviet Union, deported for forced labour. He served as editor-in-chief of Neuer Weg (German-language daily newspaper) between 1954 and 1976. He served as secretary of the German Anti-Fascist Committee 1949–1952.

He became a member of the Great National Assembly in 1952. In 1955 he became a member of the Central Committee of what was by then the Romanian Workers' Party. He was a member of the State Council between 1961 and 1965, and again from 1968 and 1969. He was the Vice Chairman of the Bureau of the Council of Working People of German Nationality between 1968 and 1978. In 1968 he was included in the National Council of the Socialist Unity Front.

He became a member of the bureau of the Romanian Writers' Union in 1960. He formed part of its executive committee between 1962 and 1968. In his literary career, he wrote novels centered on working class characters in Reschitza.

In 1976 he was replaced by Ernst Breitenstein as editor-in-chief of Neuer Weg. He also resigned from his position in the Council of Working People of German Nationality. At the 13th Party Congress he was removed from the Central Committee. No official reasoning was provided for his retreat from public positions.
