= Front of Socialist Unity and Democracy =

Romanian popular front

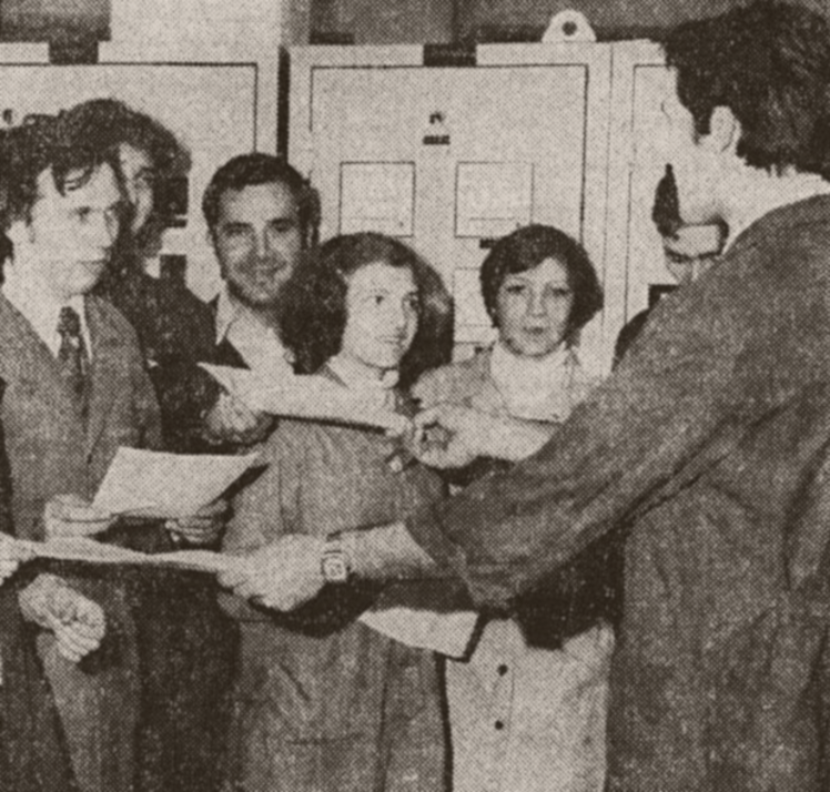
Romanian employees being handed down leaflets ahead of the FUS Second Congress in December 1979

The Front of Socialist Unity and Democracy (Romanian: Frontul Democrației și Unității Socialiste, FDUS) was a political alliance in Romania from 1968 to 1989, dominated by the Romanian Communist Party (PCR). It was de facto the only legally permitted political organization in the country for the last two decades of Communist rule.

== History ==
The alliance was formed in 1968 as the Front of Socialist Unity (Frontul Unității Socialiste, FUS), and renamed the Front of Socialist Unity and Democracy in 1980. It brought together all legal political parties in the country, replacing the People's Democratic Front. Like its predecessor, it was organised and directed by the PCR. The minor parties in the front were completely subservient to the PCR, and had to accept its "leading role" as a condition of their continued existence. No prospective candidate could run for office without the Front's approval, which in effect allowed the Front and, through it, the PCR to predetermine the composition of the legislature. Nicolae Ceaușescu, who served as general secretary of the PCR and President of Romania, was also the chairman of the Front.

Voters were presented with a single list of FUS/FDUS candidates in every election between 1969 and 1985, with the option to choose all or part of the list or reject it entirely. The Front therefore won all seats in the Great National Assembly in every election, claiming to have received at least 97 percent each time. Each time, fewer than 400,000 people either rejected the list outright, spoiled their papers, or cast blank ballots.

After the Constitution was amended to create an executive presidency, the FDUS recommended the presidential candidate in tandem with the Communist Party's Central Committee.

== Election results ==
=== Great National Assembly ===
Election	Votes	%	Seats	+/–	Position
1969	13,543,499	99.8	465 / 465	Steady	1st
1975	14,715,539	98.8	349 / 349	▼116	1st
1980	15,398,443	98.5	369 / 369	▲20	1st
1985	15,375,522	97.7	369 / 369	Steady	1st

== See also ==
- People's Democratic Front
