= Court of Audit (Romania) =

Romanian Court of Auditors
Agency overview
- Formed: January 24, 1864; 162 years ago
- Headquarters: Str. Lev Tolstoi nr. 22-24, cod 011948, sector 1, București, România
- Agency executive: Mihai Busuioc, President of Romanian Court of Accounts

The Romanian Court of Accounts (Romanian: Curtea de Conturi a României) is the Romanian state authority charged with conducting financial audit over the way the state and public resources are managed and used.

== History ==
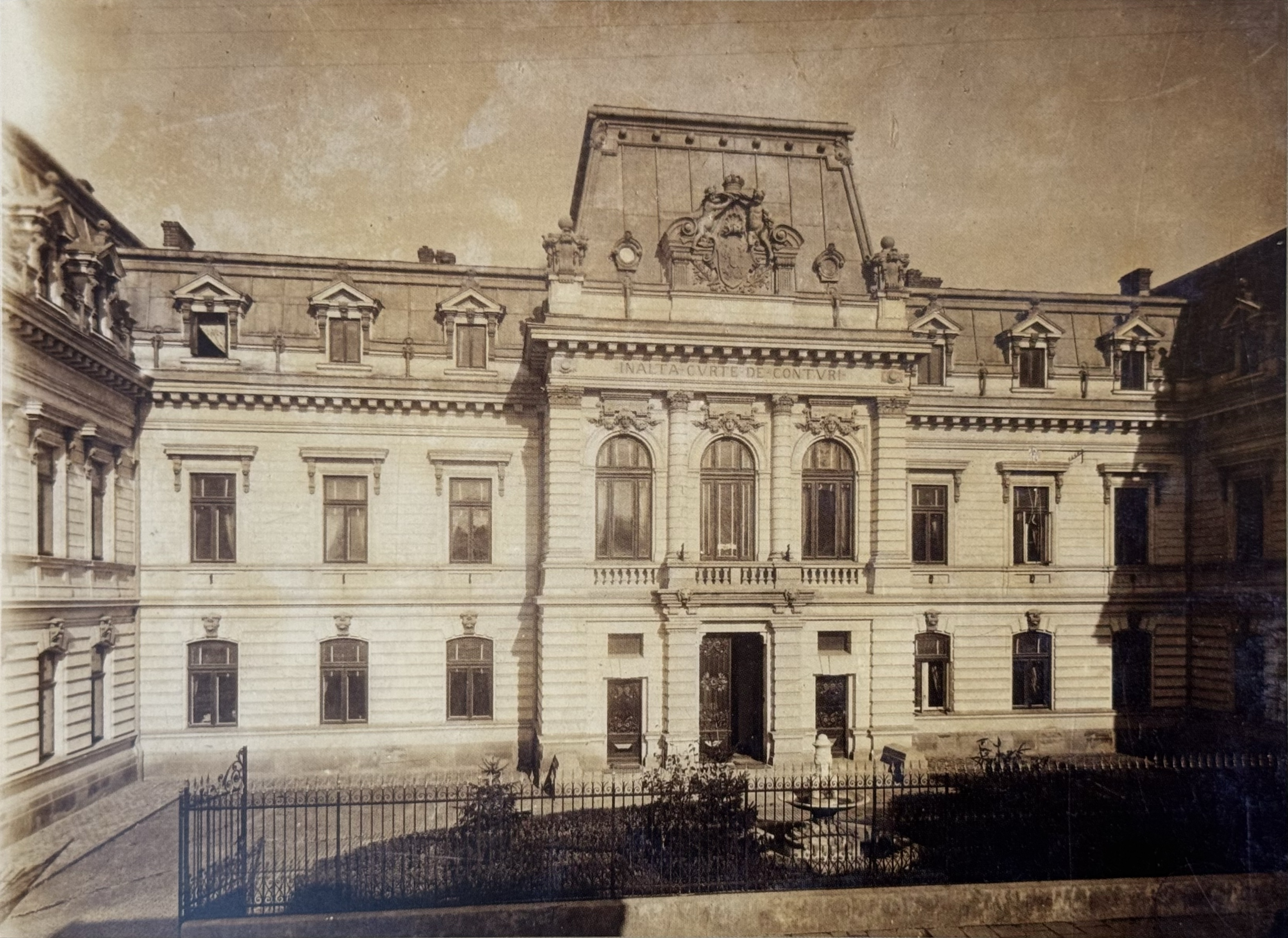
Old photo of the former Romanian Court of Audit Building in Bucharest, in Calea Griviței no. 4, designed by Constantin Băicoianu, inaugurated in 1899, later modified and transformed in 1949 into a hospital

The court was established by a law of 1864, signed by Alexandru Ioan Cuza. In December 1948, under the nascent communist regime, it was disbanded. Revived in 1973 as the Higher Court of Financial Control (Curtea Superioară de Control Financiar), this too was abolished in early 1990, following the Romanian Revolution. The Court of Audit was re-established by a law of 1992, and began functioning the following year.

== Presidents ==
- Alexandru Romalo (1864–1875)
- Emanoil Grădișteanu (1875–1893)
- George I. Lahovary (1893–1906)
- Ion Bălteanu (1906–1919)
- M. G. Stoenescu (1919–1920)
- Christu Grecescu (1920–1926)
- Ion Angelescu (1926–1929)
- Gheorghe Alesseanu (1930–1939)
- Zamfir Brătescu (1939–1943)
- Ioan Aronescu (1943–1945)
- Grigore Oghină (1945–1947)
- Ioan Deleanu (1947–1948)
- Gogu Rădulescu (1973–1989)
- Ioan Bogdan (1993–1999)
- Ion Condor (1999–2002)
- Dan Grosu Ṣaguna (2002–2008)
- Nicolae Văcăroiu (2008–2016)
- Mihai Busuioc (2016–)

== See also ==
- European Court of Auditors
