= Anti-Fascist Committee of German Workers in Romania =

Ethnic German worker's organisation in Communist Romania

The Anti-Fascist Committee of German Workers in Romania (German: Antifaschistischen Komitees der deutschen Werktätigen in Rumänien), originally the German Anti-Fascist Committee (German: Deutsche Antifaschistische Komitee; Romanian: Comitetul Antifascist German), was an anti-fascist organization for ethnic Germans in Romania. Emmerich Stoffel was the chairman of the Committee and Philipp Geltz its secretary. The Committee was based in Bucharest and published the newspaper Neuer Weg ('New Path').

By the late 1940s the post-Second World War wave of discriminations against the German minority in Romania had subdued. At its meeting in December 1948, the Political Bureau of the Central Committee of the Romanian Workers Party adopted a 'Resolution of the National Question' which outlined the need for the formation of a German Anti-Fascist Committee and a German-language newspaper. The Anti-Fascist Committee of German Workers in Romania was founded in March 1949 by a number of ethnic German party members, along with its organ Neuer Weg. The Committee was tasked with mobilizing support for the Communist government amongst ethnic German labourers. The Committee was one of a number of ethnic mass organizations in Romania at the time, alongside the Jewish Democratic Committee, Union of Slav Democratic Cultural Associations, the Hungarian Popular Union, the Democratic Committee of the Russian and Ukrainian Peoples, the Democratic Greek Committee and the Democratic Armenian Committee.
