= Neuer Weg =

Neuer Weg ('New Path') was a German language daily newspaper published from Bucharest, Romania. It was the country's main German-language newspaper under the communist regime. The first issue of the newspaper was published on 13 March 1949. Initially Neuer Weg carried the subtitle "Organ of the Antifascist Committee of German Toilers in Romania" (Organ des Antifaschistischen Komitees der deutschen Werktätigen in Rumänien). The Anti-Fascist Committee had been founded in March 1949, by a group of German members of the Romanian Workers' Party, following a decision of the Party Central Committee in December 1948. At this point the initial post-Second World War wave of discriminations against ethnic Germans had subdued. Neuer Weg was the first German-language press organ addressing a nationwide audience in Romania.

Ernst Breitenstein was the founding editor-in-chief of Neuer Weg, serving in that function until 1954. In 1953 the subtitle was changed to "Organ of the People's Council of the Romanian People's Republic" (Organ der Volksräte der Rumänischen Volksrepublik). In 1954 Breitenstein was replaced by Anton Breitenhofer as editor-in-chief. In 1969 Neuen Weg started a book publishing company.

Between 1968 and 1973 the subtitle of the newspaper was "Political Daily Newspaper in the Socialist Republic of Romania" (Politische Tageszeitung in der Sozialistischen Republik Rumänien). Between 1973 and 1989 the subtitle was to "Daily Newspaper of the National Council of the Socialist Unity Front" (Tageszeitung des Landesrates der Front der Sozialistischen Einheit).

As of the mid-1970s, Neuer Weg was published daily except on Mondays. In February 1970 Breitenstein was named Assistant Editor-in-Chief. Hugo Hausl was named Assistant Editor-in-Chief and Ioan Frank Secretary General of the publication in November 1972. In November 1976 Breitenstein returned as editor-in-chief, serving in that function until 1989. Hausl continued as Assistant Editor-in-Chief whilst Frank's tenure ended in December 1978. As of the early 1980s, it was estimated to have a daily circulation of around 70,000.

In 1992 Neuer Weg was closed down. It was replaced by Allgemeine Deutsche Zeitung für Rumänien.
