= Gheorghe I. Lahovary =

Wallachian-Romanian engineer and writer

Gheorghe I. Lahovary (June 13 [O.S. June 1] 1838 – June 25 [O.S. June 13] 1909) was a Wallachian-born Romanian engineer and writer.

== Biography ==
Born in Râmnicu Vâlcea, he studied in Bucharest. In 1855 he was sent by his parents to study in Germany. After attending the University of Berlin and Heidelberg University, he enrolled in the Polytechnic School of Karlsruhe, graduating with a degree in engineering. After returning home, he worked as a civil engineer. In 1871, when a Conservative government headed by Lascăr Catargiu took office, Lahovary was named general director of the Post and Telegraph Service. He played an important role in setting up this institution, introducing postcards, signing the first international postal and telegraph conventions of the modern Romanian state and representing his country at the first Postal Union Congress in 1874. Named an adviser at the Court of Audit in 1876, he rose to become its president in 1893. In 1895, Finance Minister Menelas Ghermani secured parliamentary passage of a law for the court's reorganization. In accordance with this law, Lahovary was obliged to retire in 1906, having reached the age of 68.

Lahovary was secretary of the Romanian Geographic Society from 1875 to 1909 and coordinated publication of Marele Dicționar Geografic al României. He was vice president and later president of the Society for the Education of the Romanian People. In 1901, he was elected an honorary member of the Romanian Academy. Despite serious health problems, he continued to be active in the cultural realm after retiring.
