= 1975 Romanian parliamentary election =

- 9 March 1975

All 349 seats in the Great National Assembly
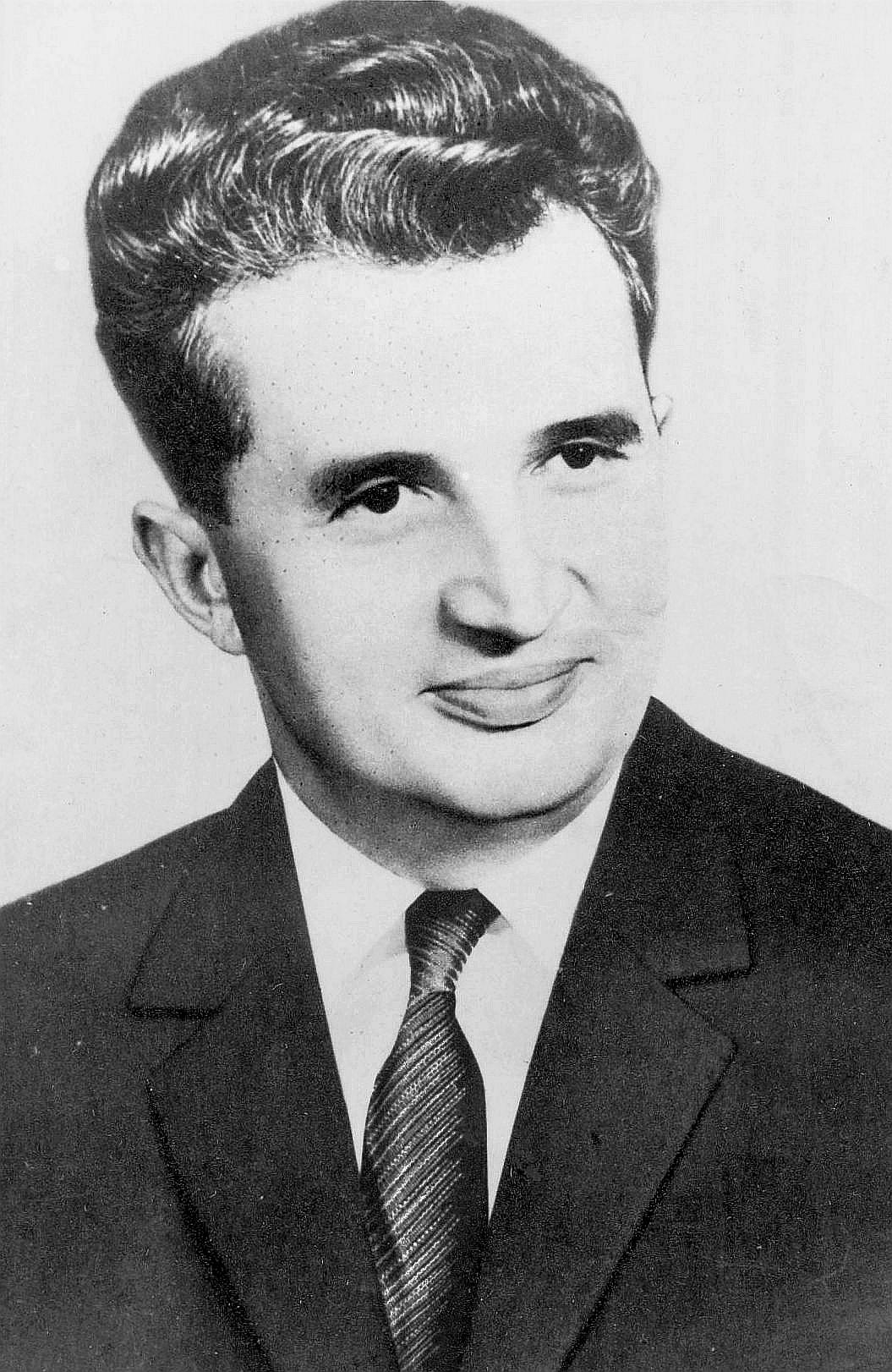
	First party
Leader	Nicolae Ceaușescu
Party	PCR
Alliance	FUS
Seats won	349
Seat change	▼116
Popular vote	14,715,539
Percentage	98.80%
Prime Minister before election
Manea Mănescu
PCR
Elected Prime Minister
Manea Mănescu
PCR

Parliamentary elections were held in Romania on 9 March 1975. The Front of Socialist Unity (FUS), dominated by the Romanian Communist Party (PCR) and including other mass organisations, was the only organisation that contested the election. No prospective candidate could run for office without the Front's prior approval. The Front won all 349 seats in the Great National Assembly.

== Electoral system ==
These were the first elections held after a constitutional amendment in 1974, which reduced the number of seats in the Assembly from 465 to 349 and extended its term from four to five years. Candidates were elected in single member constituencies, and had to receive over 50% of the vote. If no candidate passed this threshold, or if voter turnout in the constituency was less than 50%, re-runs were held until the requirements were met. Voters had the option of voting against the Front candidates.

== Results ==
Party	Votes	%	Seats
Front of Socialist Unity	14,715,539	98.80	349
Against	178,053	1.20	–
Total	14,893,592	100.00	349
Valid votes	14,893,592	100.00	
Invalid/blank votes	593	0.00	
Total votes	14,894,185	100.00	
Registered voters/turnout	14,900,032	99.96	
Source: Nohlen & Stöver
