= Alexandru Romalo (judge) =

Moldavian-born Romanian judge (1819–1875)

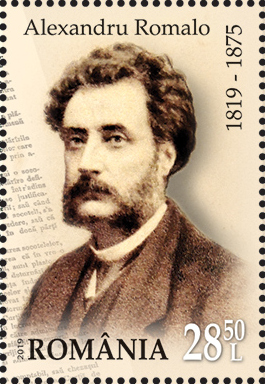
Romalo on a 2019 stamp of Romania

Alexandru Romalo (July 22 [O.S. July 10] 1819 – July 7 [O.S. June 25] 1875) was a Moldavian-born Romanian judge.

Romalo was born in Iași to Iordache Grigoriade Romalo, a postelnic, and his wife Maria (née Roset). He initially studied at Academia Mihăileană, followed by the University of Paris, where he obtained a law degree in 1845. After returning home, he held a series of posts in the administrative and judicial systems of his country. In 1849, he was named president of the Tutova County tribunal, resigning in 1852. In 1857–1858, he was active in the movement that resulted in the union of the principalities. From 1858 to 1859, he again headed the Tutova tribunal. In 1860, he was state secretary with ministerial rank in Moldavia's Religious Affairs and Public Instruction Ministry. Romalo then worked as a lawyer until 1864, when his relative Alexandru Ioan Cuza named him president of the new Court of Audit. He played a key role in organizing the court and continued to serve beyond Cuza's abdication. In early 1868, he asked to retire for health reasons, but later returned. Romalo remained as court president until his relatively early death in 1875, and was buried at Bellu cemetery.
