= Alexandru Romalo (diplomat) =

Alexandru Romalo (1890–1955) was a Romanian economist, politician, senator and diplomat. He was managing director of a Societăţii de Asigurare "Dacia", a Romanian reinsurance company. From 1 June 1940 to 15 October 1940 he was Romanian ambassador in Germany.
