= 1969 Romanian parliamentary election =

- 2 March 1969

All 465 seats in the Great National Assembly
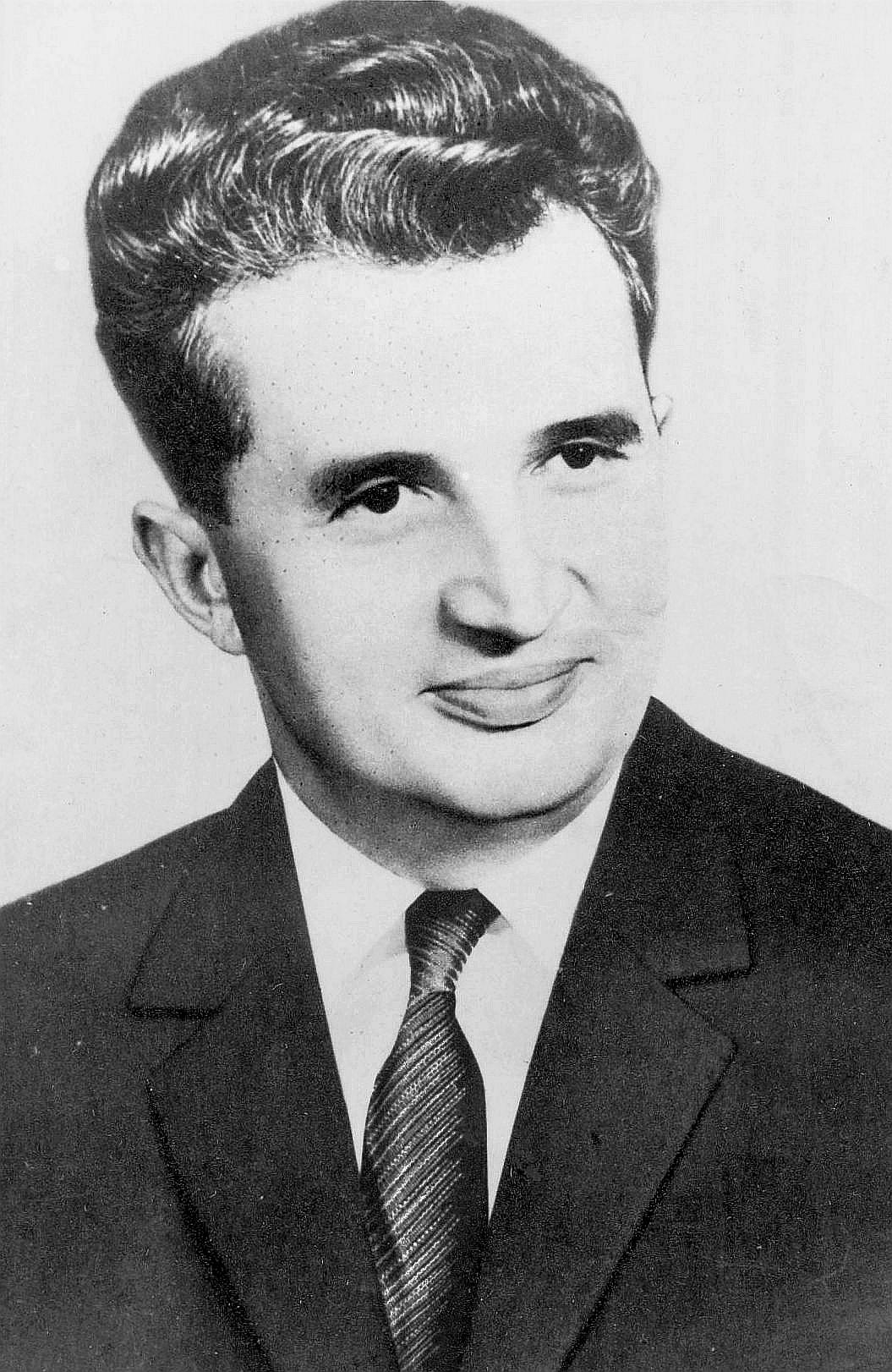
	First party
Leader	Nicolae Ceaușescu
Party	PCR
Alliance	FUS
Seats won	465
Seat change	Steady
Popular vote	13,543,499
Percentage	99.77%
Prime Minister before election
Ion Gheorghe Maurer
PCR
Elected Prime Minister
Ion Gheorghe Maurer
PCR

Parliamentary elections were held in Romania on 2 March 1969. The Front of Socialist Unity (FUS), which had been formed a year earlier to replace the People's Democratic Front (FDP), was the only organization that contested the election; no prospective candidate could run for office without the Front's prior approval. Like the People's Democratic Front, the Front of Socialist Unity was dominated by the Romanian Communist Party (PCR). The Front won all 465 seats in the Great National Assembly.

== Electoral system ==
These were the first elections held under the 1965 constitution. Candidates were elected in single member constituencies, and had to receive over 50% of the vote. If no candidate passed this threshold, or if voter turnout in the constituency was less than 50%, re-runs were held until the requirements were met. Voters had the option of voting against the Front candidates.

== Results ==
Party	Votes	%	Seats
Front of Socialist Unity	13,543,499	99.77	465
Against	30,748	0.23	–
Total	13,574,247	100.00	465
Valid votes	13,574,247	99.98	
Invalid/blank votes	2,896	0.02	
Total votes	13,577,143	100.00	
Registered voters/turnout	13,582,249	99.96	
Source: Nohlen & Stöver
