= Gheorghe Constantinescu =

Romanian footballer

Personal information
- Full name: Gheorghe Grecu Constantinescu
- Date of birth: 3 February 1912
- Position: Striker

Senior career*
Years	Team	Apps	(Gls)
1939–1943	Sportul Studențesc București		
1946–1947	Ciocanul București		

International career
1940–1943	Romania	6	(0)
- * Club domestic league appearances and goals

Gheorghe Grecu Constantinescu (born 3 February 1912, date of death unknown) was a Romanian footballer.

== International career ==
Gheorghe Constantinescu played six friendly matches for Romania, making his debut on 22 September 1940 under coach Liviu Iuga in a 2–1 victory against Yugoslavia at the 1940 King Alexander's Cup.

Scores and results table. Romania's goal tally first:

International appearances
App	Date	Venue	Opponent	Result	Competition
1.	22 September 1940	Belgrade, Yugoslavia	Yugoslavia	2–1	King Alexander's Cup 1940
2.	12 October 1941	Bucharest, Romania	Slovakia	3–2	Friendly
3.	16 August 1942	Beuthen, Nazi Germany	Germany	0–7	Friendly
4.	23 August 1942	Bratislava, Slovakia	Slovakia	0–1	Friendly
5.	11 October 1942	Bucharest, Romania	Croatia	2–2	Friendly
6.	13 June 1943	Bucharest, Romania	Slovakia	2–2	Friendly
