= Zoe Petre =

Romanian classical scholar and politician

- Born: Zoe Condurachi; 23 August 1940; Bucharest
- Died: 1 September 2017 (aged 77); Bucharest
- Occupations: Classicist; Politician

Academic background
- Education: University of Bucharest
- Thesis: The Formation of the Democratic Thinking in Ancient Greece (1978)

Academic work
- Main interests: Classics; Ancient Greece

Zoe Petre (23 August 1940 – 1 September 2017) was a Romanian classical scholar and politician.

From 1986 Petre was Dean of the Faculty of History at the University of Bucharest, and from 1996 to 2000 she was a presidential advisor to the Romanian president Emil Constantinescu.

She was awarded the Legion of Honour by the French state with the rank of Commander in 1999 and the Order of the Dannebrog by the Danish state with rank of Grand Cross in 2000.

== Select Bibliography ==
- 1993. Civilizaţia greacă şi originile democraţiei I. Bucharest.
- 1994. Societatea greacă arhaică şi clasică. Bucharest.
- 2000. Vîrsta de bronz. Bucharest.
- 2000. Cetatea greacă, între real şi imaginar. Bucharest.
