= Dumitru Popescu (politician) =

Romanian politician (1928–2024)

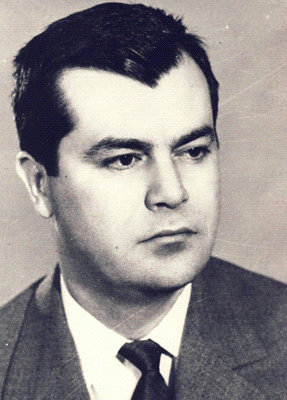

Member of the Great National Assembly of the Socialist Republic of Romania
- In office 1965–1989

Personal details
- Born: 18 April 1928 Turnu Măgurele, Romania
- Died: 22 November 2024 (aged 96)
- Party: PCR
- Education: Bucharest Academy of Economic Studies
- Occupation: Journalist

Dumitru Popescu (18 April 1928 – 22 November 2024) was a Romanian journalist and politician. A member of the Romanian Communist Party, he served in the Great National Assembly from 1965 to 1989.

Popescu died on 22 November 2024, at the age of 96.
