= 1980 Romanian parliamentary election =

- 9 March 1980

All 369 seats in the Great National Assembly
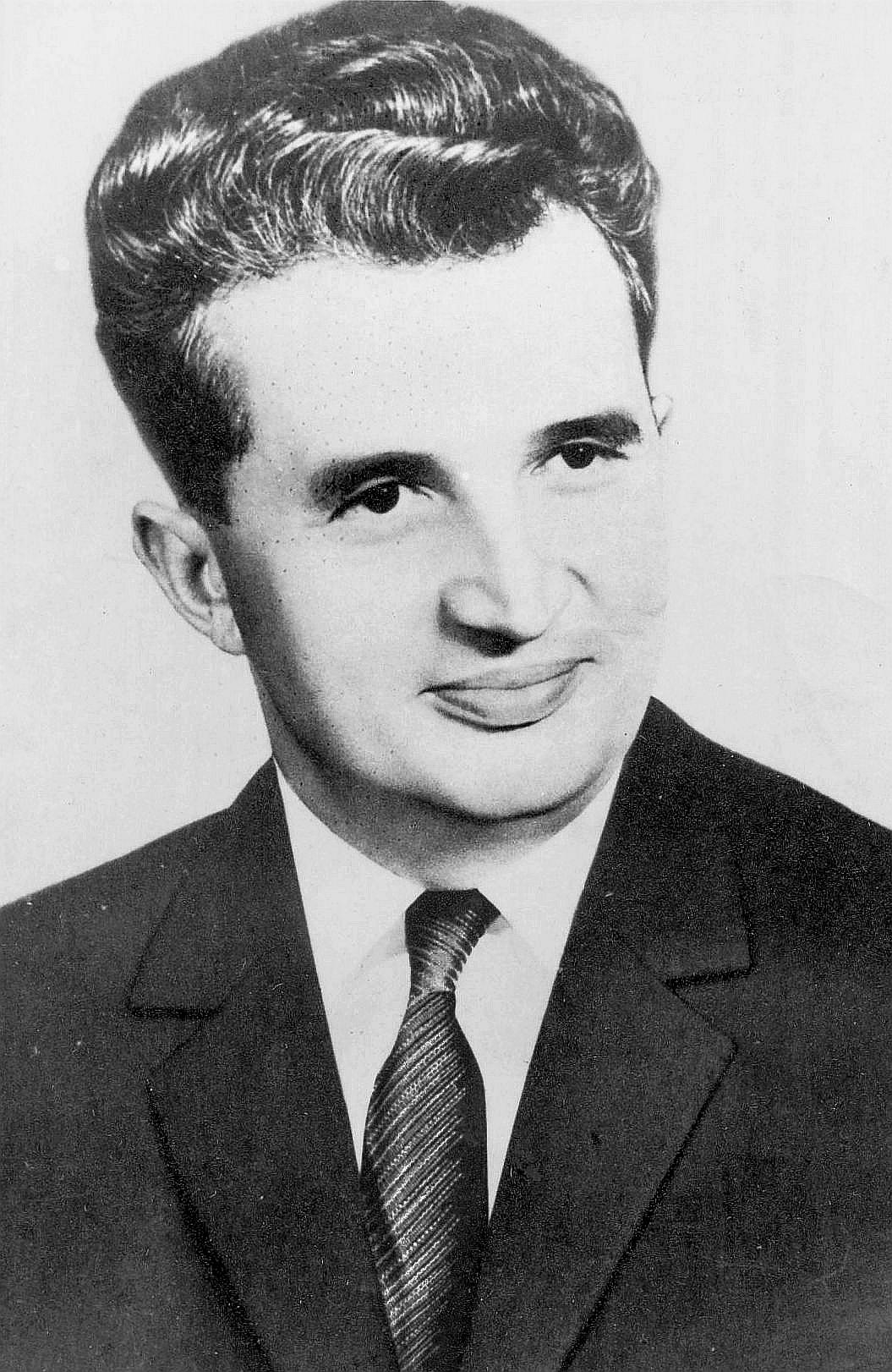
	First party
Leader	Nicolae Ceaușescu
Party	PCR
Alliance	FDUS
Seats won	369
Seat change	▲20
Popular vote	15,398,443
Percentage	98.52%
Prime Minister before election
Ilie Verdeț
PCR
Elected Prime Minister
Ilie Verdeț
PCR

Parliamentary elections were held in Romania on 9 March 1980. The Front of Socialist Unity and Democracy (FDUS), dominated by the Romanian Communist Party (PCR) and including other mass organisations, was the only organisation that contested the election. No prospective candidate could run for office without the Front's prior approval. The Front won all 369 seats in the Great National Assembly.

== Electoral system ==
Candidates were elected in single member constituencies, and had to receive over 50% of the vote. If no candidate passed this threshold, or if voter turnout in the constituency was less than 50%, re-runs were held until the requirements were met. Voters had the option of voting against the Front candidates.

== Results ==
Party	Votes	%	Seats
Front of Socialist Unity and Democracy	15,398,443	98.52	369
Against	230,611	1.48	–
Total	15,629,054	100.00	369
Valid votes	15,629,054	100.00	
Invalid/blank votes	44	0.00	
Total votes	15,629,098	100.00	
Registered voters/turnout	15,631,351	99.99	
Source: Nohlen & Stöver
