= Foreign debt of the Socialist Republic of Romania =

Debts accumulated under Ceaușescu in the 1970s and 1980s

The foreign debt of the Socialist Republic of Romania were loans made by Socialist Republic of Romania under Nicolae Ceaușescu from international creditors denominated in hard currencies. These loans were used to buy technology, equipment and raw materials needed for the industrialization of the country.

As oil prices increased during the 1979 energy crisis, together with the rising international interest rates, Romania found it difficult to pay it back, leading to the necessity to request the IMF a line of credit. As such loans had strings attached (structural adjustment), Ceaușescu decided that Romania should pay all its debts, leading to the 1980s austerity policy in Romania.

== Loans and industrial development ==
Early in the 1970s, the Western countries were willing to fund Romania's acquisition of technology through loans given on political considerations. The debts of Romania to Western creditors rose from just $1.2 billion in 1971 to a peak of $13 billion in 1982.

== 1979 crisis ==
The 1979 energy crisis combined with the increase in interest rates made Romania incapable of repaying its debts.

== IMF involvement ==
In 1981, in order to pay its due debts, Romania requested the International Monetary Fund a line of credit and adopted a policy to pay back all its debt. The decision to repay the debt has been considered irrational, as other developing countries that were hit by the same problem were able to obtain debt rescheduling or "haircuts".

== Loan payments and austerity ==
As the IMF recommended, imports were reduced and exports were increased. The effect of the cuts in imports in Romania, a net importer of food from the West, was however not correctly estimated by the foreign analysts and it led to food shortages.

Romania's record - having all of its debts to commercial banks paid off in full - has not been matched by any other heavily-indebted country in the world. The policy to repay - and, in multiple cases, prepay - Romania's external debt became the dominant policy in the late 1980s. The result was economic stagnation throughout the 1980s and - towards the end of the decade - the conditions were created for an economic crisis. The country's industrial capacity was eroded as equipment grew obsolete, energy intensity increased and the standard of living deteriorated significantly. Draconian restrictions were imposed on the household energy use to ensure an adequate supply for the industry. Convertible currency exports were promoted at all costs and imports were severely compressed. In 1988, real GDP contracted by 0.5%, mostly due to a decline in industrial output caused by significantly increased material costs. Despite the 1988 decline, the net foreign balance reached its decade peak (9.5% of GDP). In 1989, GDP slumped by a further 5.8% due to growing shortages and the increasingly obsolete capital stock. By March 1989, virtually all of the external debt had been repaid. The entire medium- and long-term external debt was repaid. The lingering amount, totalling less than $500 million, consisted of short-term credits (mainly short-term export credits granted by Romania). A 1989 decree legally prohibited Romanian entities from contracting external debt. The CIA World Factbook edition of 1990 listed Romania's external debt as "none" as of mid-1989.

=== Yearly evolution (in billions of dollars) ===
- 1995 was the last year in which Romania's economy was dominated by the state. From 1996 onwards, the private sector would account for most of Romania's GDP.
- Data for 1975, 1980 and 1982-1988 taken from the Statistical Abstract of the United States.
- Data for 1989-1995 provided by the OECD.
- Data for 1981 and 1985 provided by the World Book Year Book.
- By April 1989, with its debt virtually zero, Romania was a net external creditor. Foreign borrowing was resumed after December 1989. In order to maintain net creditor status, Romania had to keep its external debt under $2.5 billion, the low estimate of the amount it was owed by oil producers and other LDCs. This was first achieved in 1988 and continued through the early 1990s.

	1975	1980	1981	1982	1983	1984	1985	1986	1987	1988	1989	1990	1991	1992	1993	1994	1995
Gross external debt	2.9	9.4	10.2	9.8	8.8	7.1	6.6	6.4	5.1	2.2	0.0	0.2	2.2	3.5	4.5	5.5	6.7
Net status	debtor	debtor	debtor	debtor	debtor	debtor	debtor	debtor	debtor	creditor	creditor	creditor	creditor	debtor	debtor	debtor	debtor

== Aftermath ==
At the end of 1989, Romania's GDP amounted to $53.7 billion and its total external debt was $0.0 billion. However, external debt is only part of a country's public debt, the other part being its internal debt. The tax burden on Romanian enterprises was based on unrealistic plan targets, resulting in large enterprise losses due to excessive tax burden. These losses were financed by bank credit. These accumulated bank debts of state enterprises and cooperatives were written off against government bank deposits resulting from past fiscal surpluses (the fiscal surplus of 1989, for instance, was over 8% of GDP). The cost was the near elimination of these deposits by the end of 1990 (fiscal surplus for 1990 amounted to less than 2% of GDP). Thus, Romania jumped from not even being in the top 10 countries with the smallest public debt (as percentage of GDP) in 1989 to being the world leader in 1990. Romania remained the country with the smallest public debt in 1991, falling to the 6th place in 1992 and 1993 and finally to the 9th place in 1994.
