= Manea Mănescu =

Romanian politician

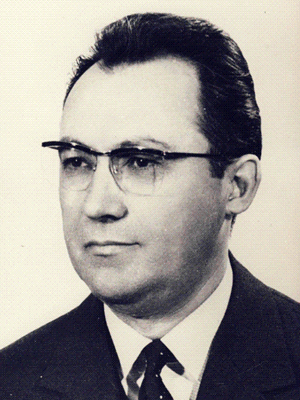

50th Prime Minister of Romania
- In office 27 February 1974 – 29 March 1979
- President: Nicolae Ceaușescu
- Preceded by: Ion Gheorghe Maurer
- Succeeded by: Ilie Verdeț

Vice President of the State Council
- In office 1969–1972
- President: Nicolae Ceaușescu
- Preceded by: Constanța Crăciun
- Succeeded by: Miron Constantinescu
- In office 1983–1989
- President: Nicolae Ceaușescu
- Preceded by: Ilie Verdeț
- Succeeded by: Office abolished

Chairman of the State Planning Committee
- In office 13 October 1972 – 27 February 1974
- Prime Minister: Ion Gheorghe Maurer
- Preceded by: Maxim Berghianu
- Succeeded by: Emil Drăgănescu

Minister of Finance
- In office 3 October 1955 – 19 March 1957
- Prime Minister: Chivu Stoica
- Preceded by: Dumitru Petrescu
- Succeeded by: Aurel Vijoli

Personal details
- Born: 9 August 1916 Brăila, Kingdom of Romania
- Died: 27 February 2009 (aged 92) Bucharest, Romania
- Party: Romanian Communist Party
- Spouse: Maria Munteanu (m. 1948; died 2005)
- Education: Bucharest Academy of Economic Studies

Manea Mănescu (Romanian pronunciation: [ˈmane̯a məˈnesku]; 9 August 1916 – 27 February 2009) was a Romanian economist and politician who served as Prime Minister of Romania from 1974 to 1979 during the Ceaușescu regime.

== Early life and education ==
Manea Mănescu was born on 9 August 1916. His father was a veteran socialist activist from Ploiești who, in the early 1920s, supported the transformation of the Socialist Party into the Romanian Communist Party (PCR). Mănescu studied economics at the Academy of Economic Studies in Bucharest and joined the Romanian Communist Party in 1938 while still a student.

== Communist activism and academic career ==
Following the 23 August 1944 coup d'état, Mănescu worked within the Union of Communist Youth, where he collaborated closely with Nicolae Ceaușescu.

In 1951, Mănescu was appointed head of the Department of Economics at the University of Bucharest and Director General of the Central Directorate of Statistics. He served as Minister of Finance from 1955 to 1957.

== Rise within the party ==
In December 1967, Mănescu was appointed Chairman of the Economic Council. He became a full member of the Executive Committee of the PCR in December 1968, consolidating his position within the party’s technocratic elite.

In 1974, he was elected a titular member of the Romanian Academy.

== Prime Minister of Romania ==
Mănescu was appointed Prime Minister in March 1974, serving until 1979. His tenure coincided with Romania’s growing foreign debt and the introduction of strict economic austerity measures. He was widely regarded as a loyal supporter of Ceaușescu and functioned primarily as an administrator rather than a policy initiator.

He retired from office in 1979, reportedly due to ill health.

== Romanian Revolution and imprisonment ==
Mănescu remained close to Nicolae and Elena Ceaușescu until the Romanian Revolution of December 1989. On 22 December, he evacuated the Central committee building in Bucharest by helicopter together with them, though he was forced to disembark at Snagov due to excess weight aboard the aircraft.

He was arrested shortly thereafter and detained at the military airbase in Deveselu until 31 December 1989. In early 1990, he was tried alongside Emil Bobu, Ion Dincă, and Tudor Postelnicu and sentenced to life imprisonment for participation in genocide. On appeal, the sentence was reduced to ten years. He served two years in prison and was released on 12 November 1992 due to poor health.

As a result of his conviction, Mănescu was stripped of his membership in the Romanian Academy.

== Family ==
Mănescu was married to Maria Munteanu Mănescu, a prominent pediatrician. In December 1973, she was appointed Vice Chairwoman of the Romanian Red Cross Society and in April 1978 became a member of the National Council of Women. It is not clear whether the couple had any children.

== Death ==
Mănescu died in February 2009 at the age of 92. He was buried at Bellu Cemetery in Bucharest.

Political offices
Preceded by Ion Gheorghe Maurer	Prime Minister of Romania; 1974–1979	Succeeded by Ilie Verdeț
