= Great National Assembly (Romania) =

Supreme body of the state of Romania (1948–1989)

Great National Assembly Marea Adunare Națională
- Communist Romania (1948-1989)

Type
- Type: Unicameral

History
- Established: 13 April 1948
- Disbanded: 22 December 1989
- Preceded by: National Representation^{1} (Assembly of Deputies^{2})
- Succeeded by: Parliament of Romania (Senate and Assembly (later Chamber) of Deputies)
- Seats: 369

Elections
- Voting system: Direct show elections

Meeting place
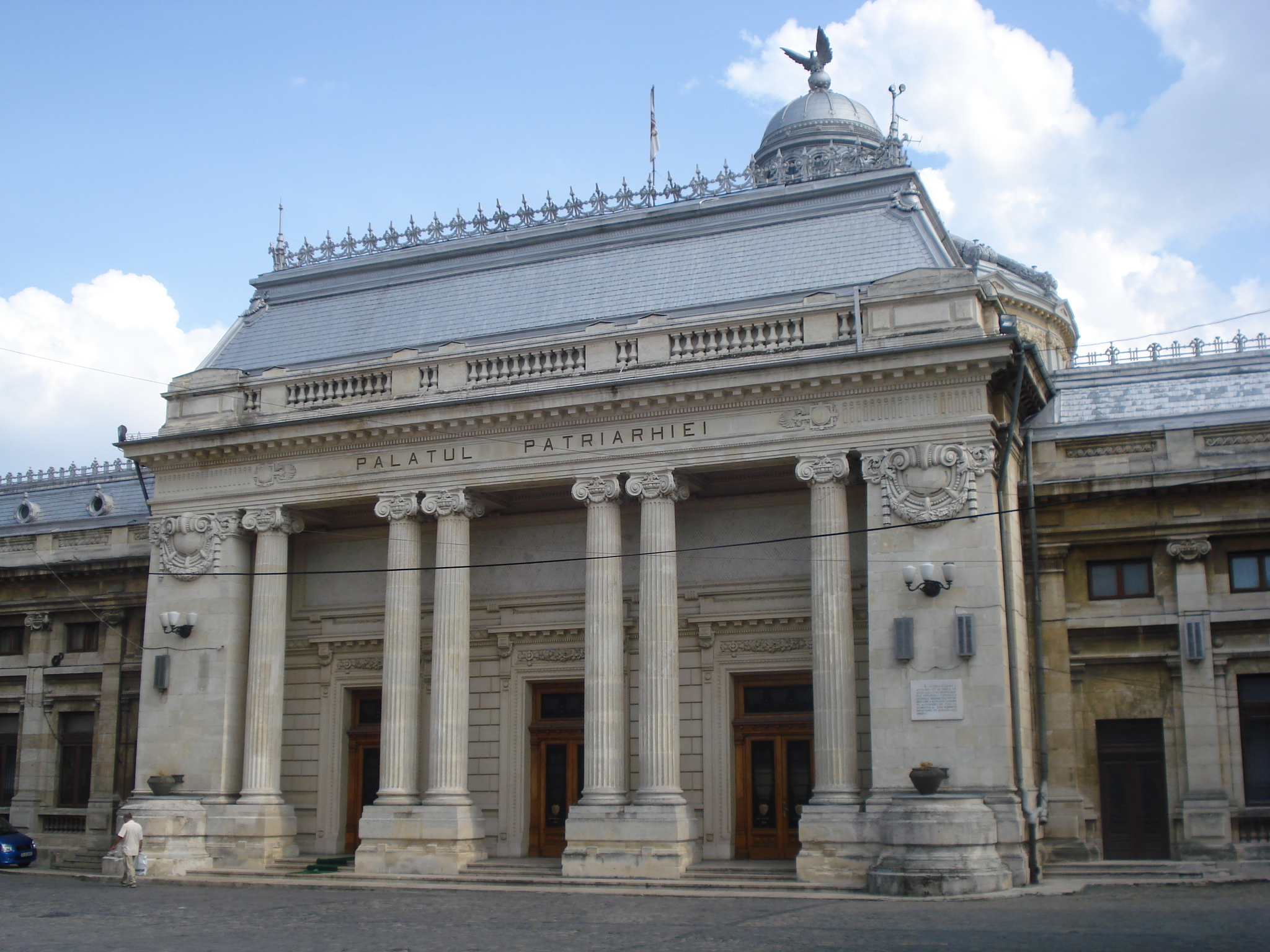
- Palatul Adunării Deputaților

Footnotes
- ^{1}the name under which the Parliament of Romania was defined by the 1866 and 1923 Constitutions;^{2}after World War II the Constitution of 1923 was reestablished; due to the communist occupation of the country the Senate was suspended;

The Great National Assembly (Romanian: Marea Adunare Națională, MAN) was the legislature of communist Romania (known as the Romanian People's Republic between 1948 and 1965, and the Socialist Republic of Romania thereafter). In imitation of the Soviet model and per the principle of unified power, the Great National Assembly was the supreme body of state power and only branch of government in communist Romania and all state organs were subservient to it. After the overthrow of Communism in Romania in December 1989, the Great National Assembly was dissolved by decree of the National Salvation Front (FSN) and eventually replaced by the bicameral parliament, made up of the Assembly of Deputies (later known as the Chamber of Deputies) and the Senate.

The Great National Assembly was elected every four years, and each individual member represented 60,000 citizens.

== Powers ==
The MAN had the power to, among other things, amend the constitution and appoint and depose the Supreme Commander of the Romanian People's Army. The resolutions required a simple majority to be passed through.

The Assembly convened twice a year for ordinary sessions and for extraordinary sessions as many times as required by the State Council or by at least one third of the members of the Assembly. It elected its own chairmen and four deputies to preside each session. On paper, it was the highest level of state power in Romania, and all other state organs were subordinate to it. In practice, like all other Communist legislatures, it did little more than give legal sanction to decisions already made by the Romanian Communist Party (PCR).

Formally, the MAN gained in power over time. The 1948 Constitution (article 39) granted it just eight powers; the 1952 Constitution (article 24), 10; the 1965 Constitution (article 43), 24.

Voters were presented with a single slate of candidates from an alliance dominated by the PCR—known as the People's Democratic Front from 1947 to 1968, the Socialist Unity Front from 1968 to 1980, and the Front of Socialist Unity and Democracy from 1980 to 1989. Since no one could run for office without Front approval, the Front—and through it, the PCR—effectively predetermined the composition of the Assembly.

When the Assembly was not in session, some of its powers were exercised by the State Council (which the Constitution defined as the MAN in permanent session), such as setting guidelines for the law and supervising the local councils. It could also issue governmental regulations in lieu of law. If such regulation was not approved by the MAN at its next session, it was considered revoked. However, under the principles of democratic centralism, such approval was merely a formality. Combined with the MAN's infrequent sessions, this meant that State Council decisions de facto had the force of law. In emergencies, the State Council assumed the MAN's powers to control the budget and economic plan, appoint and dismiss ministers and justices of the Supreme Court, mobilize the armed forces and declare war.

== 1980 elections ==
According to the official results of the 9 March 1980 election, which elected 369 deputies, 99.99% of the registered voters cast their votes. Of them, 98.52% approved the Front list, 1.48% voted against and just 44 votes were declared invalid.

192 seats of the Assembly were occupied by women and 47 seats belonged to national minorities (mainly Hungarians and Germans).

== Presidents of the Great National Assembly ==
The "lower house" numbering continues from the numbering of presidents of the old Assembly of Deputies (1862–1948).

Great National Assembly presidents
Lower house number	No.	Name	Portrait	Lifespan	Took office	Left office	Party	Duration
41	1	Gheorghe Apostol		1913–2010	7 April 1948	11 June 1948	PMR	65 days
42	2	Constantin Agiu		1891–1961	11 June 1948	27 December 1948	PMR	199 days
43	3	Constantin Pârvulescu		1895–1992	27 December 1948	5 July 1949	PMR	190 days
44	4	Dumitru Petrescu		1906–1969	5 July 1949	28 December 1949	PMR	176 days
45	5	Alexandru Drăghici		1913–1993	28 December 1949	26 January 1950	PMR	29 days
(44)	(4)	Dumitru Petrescu		1906–1969	26 January 1950	29 May 1950	PMR	123 days
46	6	Constantin Doncea		1904–1973	29 May 1950	6 September 1950	PMR	100 days
(41)	(1)	Gheorghe Apostol		1913–2010	6 September 1950	5 April 1951	PMR	211 days
47	7	Ion Vincze		1910–1996	5 April 1951	26 March 1952	PMR	356 days
(41)	(1)	Gheorghe Apostol		1913–2010	26 March 1952	6 June 1952	PMR	72 days
48	8	Gheorghe Stoica		1900–1976	2 June 1952	30 November 1952	PMR	181 days
(43)	(3)	Constantin Pârvulescu		1895–1992	23 January 1953	5 March 1961	PMR	8 years, 41 days
49	9	Ştefan Voitec		1900–1984	20 March 1961	28 March 1974	PMR/PCR	13 years, 8 days
50	10	Miron Constantinescu		1917–1974	28 March 1974	18 July 1974	PCR	112 days
51	11	Nicolae Giosan		1921–1990	26 July 1974	12 December 1989	PCR	15 years, 139 days
