= Constantin Brătianu =

Constantin Brătianu was the name of various members of the Brătianu family

- Dincă Brătianu (1768–1844), Vlach boyar
- Dinu Brătianu (1866–1950), Romanian politician (last chairman of the old National Liberal party until 1947)
- Bebe Brătianu (1887–1955), Romanian politician (last general secretary of the old National Liberal party until 1947)
- Constantin Brătianu (professor)
