= Elisa Brătianu =

Romanian aristocrat and political figure (1870–1957)

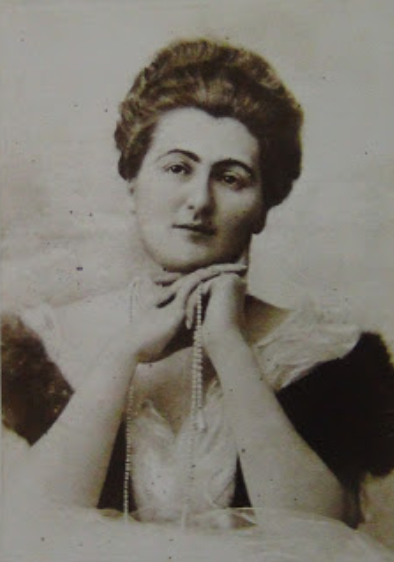
- Born: Elisa I. Știrbei; 2 May [O.S. 20 April] 1870; Buftea, United Principalities of Moldavia and Wallachia
- Died: 13 May 1957 (aged 87); Bucharest, Romanian People's Republic
- Other names: Elisa Marghiloman, Eliza Știrbei
- Occupations: Cultural preservationist; writer
- Years active: 1897–1948
- Spouses: Alexandru Marghiloman (m. 1890; div. 1906) Ion I. C. Brătianu (m. 1907; died 1927)
- Parent(s): Alexandru B. Știrbei (father); Maria Ghika-Comănești (mother)
- Relatives: Barbu Știrbey (brother); Barbu Dimitrie Știrbei (grandfather); Gheorghe Bibescu (great uncle)
- Family: Brătianu family Știrbei family

Elisa Brătianu (2 May [O.S. 20 April] 1870 – 13 May 1957) was a Romanian aristocrat, political figure and participant in the Inter-Allied Women's Conference of 1919. She was born into the Stirbey royal family, the daughter of Prince Alexandru B. Știrbei (1837-1895) and the Princess Maria Ghika-Comănești (1851-1885), inheritor of two noble titles, the Ghika family occupying the title of royal family in the history of Romania. An avid gardener, she designed the gardens at the Albatross Villa in Buzău and discussed plans for gardens in Bucharest with the town gardener. Concerned about the loss of traditional Romanian culture, she developed schools to keep stitchery traditions alive and published books of patterns. When her husband, long-serving prime minister Ion I.C. Brătianu died, she spearheaded a foundation to collect his archives and create a library to publish his most important works.

== Early life ==
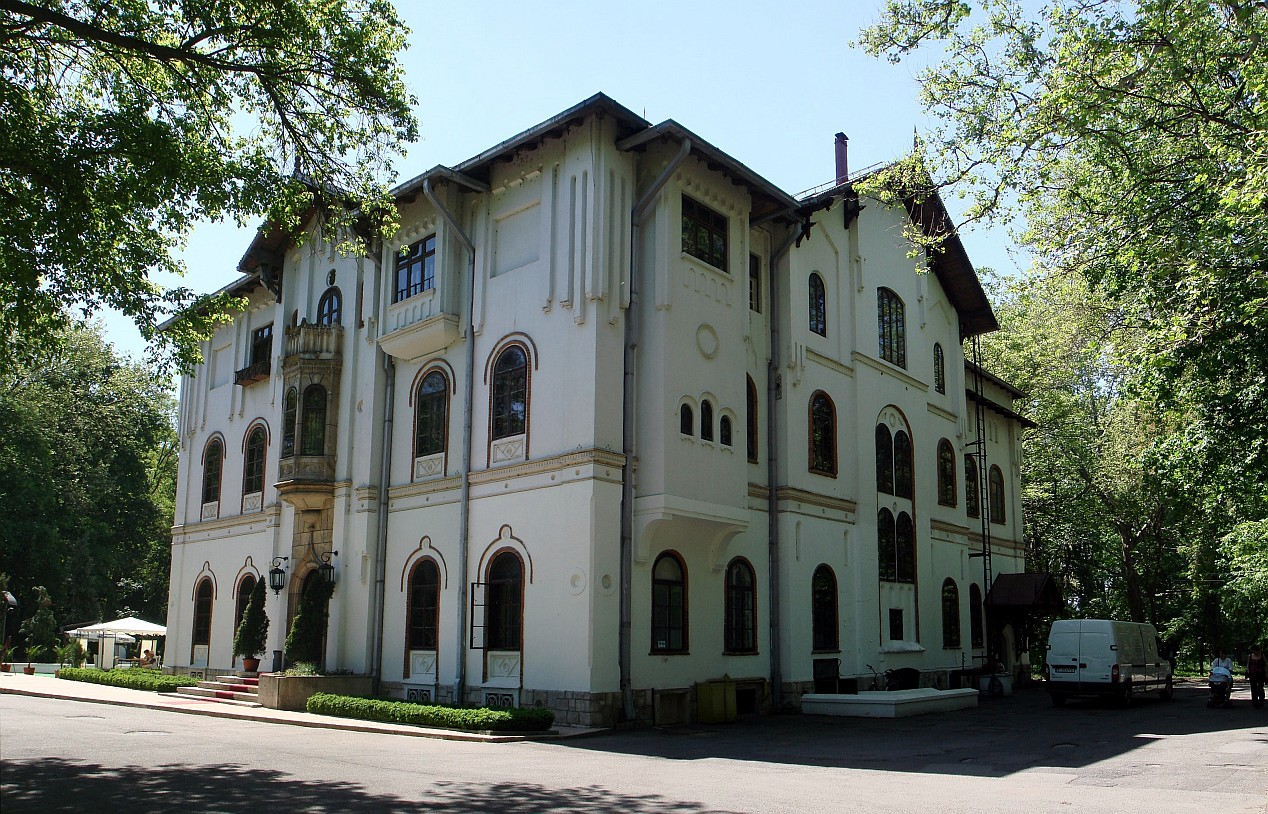
Ştirbei Palace, Buftea, 2012

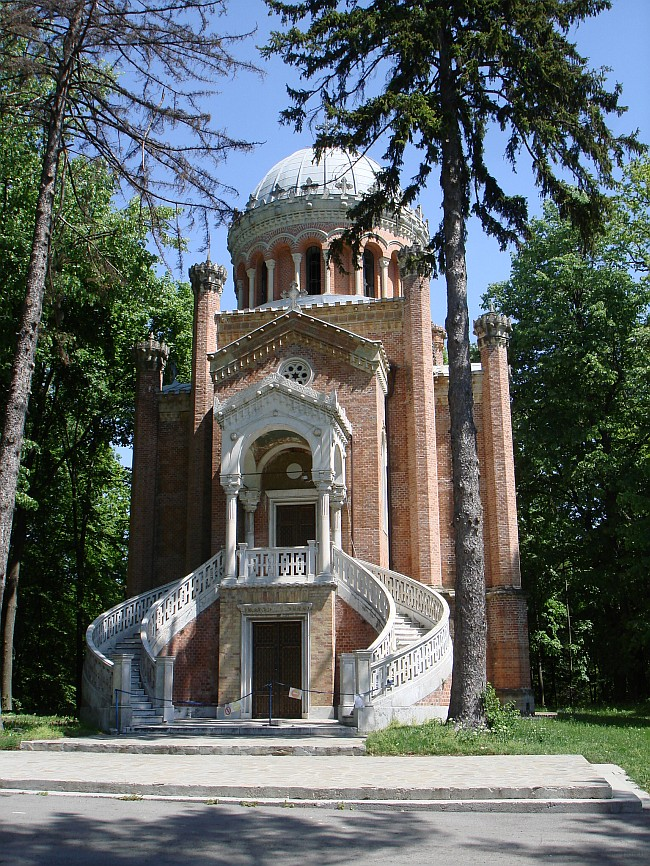
Ştirbei Palace Chapel, Buftea, 2012

Princess Elisa I. Știrbei was born on 2 May 1870 at Știrbei Palace, in Buftea, located in the United Principalities of Moldavia and Wallachia to Prince Alexandru B. Știrbei and his wife, Princess Maria Ghika-Comănești (1851-1885). Her mother Maria was originally from Comănești in the Principality of Moldavia, while her father's family were from Muntenia in the Principality of Wallachia. As the union of the two principalities had occurred only eleven years prior to Știrbei's birth, her mother worked to ensure that the children thought of themselves as Romanians. Her mother's dowry included the winery and estate in Dărmănești, which would serve as the Știrbei family's summer home. Her father was an industrialist who took a specific interest in preserving and expanding the architectural holdings of his family and was involved in politics. Her grandfather, Barbu Dimitrie Știrbei, was a Prince of Wallachia. Having been born into the Bibescu family and adopted by his uncle the heirless Barbu C. Știrbey, last of the ancient Oltenian boyars, Barbu D. Știrbei and his brother Prince Gheorghe Bibescu were both active in Wallachian politics.

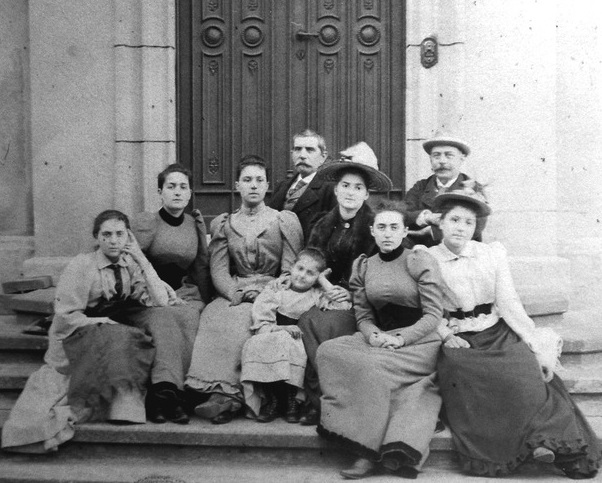
Alexandru B. Știrbei with his family on the steps of their palace in Buftea

The oldest of eight children, Elisa's siblings were Elena (1871–1897), Barbu A. (1872–1946), Zoe (1874–1896), Maria (1876–1963) Adina (1877–1967), Gheorghe (1883–1917) and Ioana (1885–1914). The children were tutored at home in the Știrbei Palace by a series of tutors, who included Ioan Slavici. Slavici was influential upon Știrbei's life, introducing her to the poet Mihai Eminescu, beginning her love of literature. She studied language and became fluent in English, French, German, and Romanian. She remembered her childhood as idyllic spending time at the family palaces in Bucharest, Buftea and Dărmăneşti, until her mother's death, which coincided with the birth of her youngest sister, Ioana.

== Activism ==
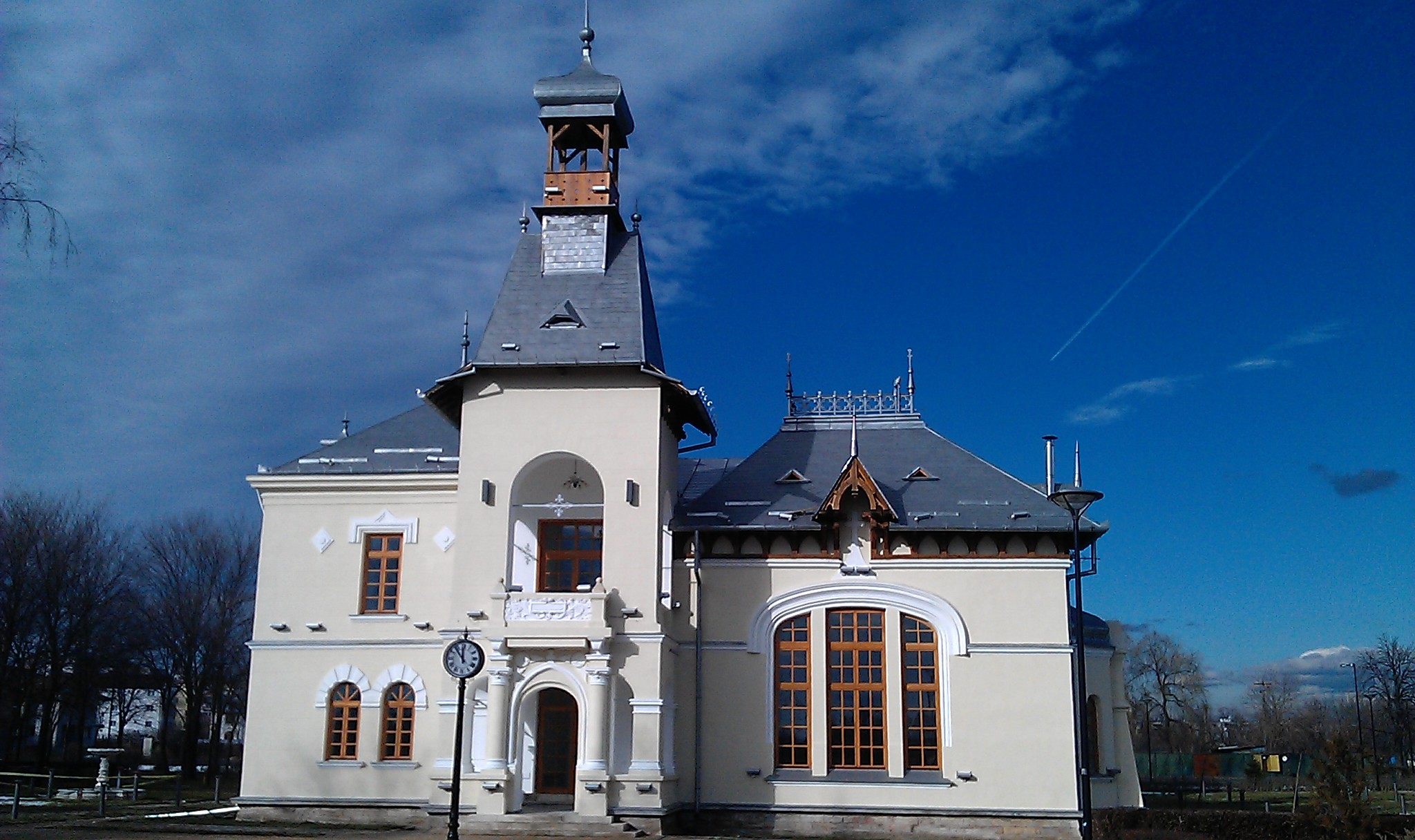
Albatros Villa, 2015

At the urging of her father, in 1890, Știrbei married Alexandru Marghiloman, a Conservative politician sixteen years her senior. In 1897, the couple moved into the Albatross Villa in Buzău, where Știrbei, who was an avid gardener, planned and assisted in the creation of the English landscape park which was a favorite of Queen Marie of Romania and noted in the queen's memoirs. She was consulted by the Bucharest City gardener for his work on the Cișmigiu Gardens and a series of lakes for the neighborhood of Colentina. Știrbei also supported literary talents like Nicolae Iorga and Pamfil Șeicaru, financially assisting Iorga in launching Floarea Darurilor in 1906.

Știrbei and Marghiloman divorced in 1906, and she was returned her dowry property, as well as several thousand hectares of property in Fundeni Village in Zărneşti Commune of Buzău County. On 3 March 1907, in a dual ceremony held first at the Town Hall of Bucoveni in Ilfov County, and followed by a religious service on 4 March by a priest from Amzei Church at Știrbei Palace, Știrbei married Ion I. C. Brătianu, (Note: Şerban states that the ceremonies took place at the Amzei Church, followed by a ceremony at Știrbei Palace. In Romanian tradition, the religious ceremony typically precedes the second service; however, given the dates of the Brătianu Cultural Centre's records, it seems probable the couple reversed the process.) a Liberal politician and political rival of her previous husband. Her relationship with the Brătianu family, and particularly Ion's sister Sabina Cantacuzino would be difficult, especially after their mother, Caliopia's death.

In 1913, during the Second Balkan War Brătianu established an ambulance service to assist cholera patients who had participated in the Bulgarian campaign. She also converted rooms in Știrbei Palace and their home in the Amzei suburb of Bucharest into hospital barracks. As World War I began, Brătianu organized a women's workshop, known as "Albina" to encourage the tradition of Romanian stitching handicrafts. She collected various patterns of needlework and published them in an album. She also organized a seamstresses' school in Ștefănești, compiling another publication of the students' best works. At the school, students learned to make traditional Romanian blouses and sheep skin coats, as well as other traditional clothing. Wanting to be able to read Dostoevsky and Tolstoy in their original languages, during the war, she decided to learn Russian. In addition to her philanthropic projects to preserve Romanian culture, from the time of her marriage to Ion, Brătianu served as hostess and participant in the center of Romanian politics, entertaining diplomats and dignitaries who were consultants and friends of her husband.

At the end of the war Brătianu accompanied her husband, who was by that time the Prime Minister of Romania, to the Paris Peace Conference of 1919 and participated with the deputation of women from the Inter-Allied Women's Conference in their historic presentation on women's concerns to the League of Nations. When Ion's mother Caliopia died on 3 February 1920, he and Brătianu used his family's estate "Florica", in Ștefănești, Argeș County, as a refuge from the city and politics. Ion turned the gardens over to Brătianu which exacerbated conflict with his sister Sabina, who saw the gardens as her mother's legacy. Turning away from the conflict, Brătianu abandoned the gardens, focusing her attention in the interwar years on organizing materials for the Ion I.C. Brătianu Cultural Foundation.

When Ion died in 1927, Brătianu met with his brothers, Vintila and Constantin to incorporate the foundation in 1928. The three-fold purpose of the foundation was to establish a library to archive Ion's papers, publish his most important works, and raise a statue in his memory. Brătianu donated a property located at #3 Lascăr Catargiu Boulevard, where the "Albina Society" would continue to operate, as well as the lot at #5 Lascăr Catargiu Blvd. The brothers donated 6,000 volumes from the library at "Florica", which had been Ion's to start the library's collections. Dimitrie Sturdza's heirs and other family connections also donated books to the library, bringing the quantity of books to over 20,000 volumes by 1933. Construction began in 1931 to build a separate facility for the library and reading room on lot 5, which was completed around 1938. In 1935, the foundation contracted with Ivan Meštrović, at Brătianu's request, to sculpt the marble statue of Ion I. C. Brătianu, for the park in front of the new library. The dedication of the completed project was celebrated on 24 November 1938 with attendance by many Romanian dignitaries and the public.

Beginning in 1940, Brătianu dictated her memoirs in French to her secretary. After her sisters proclaimed the memories "boring", she destroyed the first copy. It is believed that she later dictate a second collection of her memoirs to Olga Kogalniceanu-Cogal, which ended up in the archives of the Securitate. During World War II, she was encouraged by Liberal Party leaders to maintain communications with Allied diplomats, like Reginald Hoare to negotiate how the Romanians could limit Soviet expansion. She was also sent as an emissary to Cairo to explore the possibility of an armistice with the Western Allies. When the Romanian Government began bringing children suffering from the drought and poverty from Moldavia to Bucharest, in 1945, Brătianu began making slippers to shod them. When the communists took control of the government in 1945, the Ion I.C. Brătianu Cultural Foundation ceased to exist and the building became nationalized. Many of the books and furniture were removed from the center and the statue was taken down, though it was not destroyed. In 1948, Brătianu was evicted from her home and her property was expropriated by the communists. She managed to remove some of her family heirlooms and was offered rooms with Magdalena Beldiman, daughter of Radu Rosetti. She survived her final years by selling off her furnishings and family silver, as well as making slippers for sale.

== Death and legacy ==
Brătianu died on 13 May 1957 and was buried in the Rosetti Family Tomb in the Bellu Cemetery. In 1991, after the Romanian Revolution had overturned the communist regime, the statue of Ion I. C. Brătianu was located and restored to its original location. Marian Stefan collected the memoirs of Elisa and Ion Brătianu and published them in Magazin Istoric in 1992 and 1997. In 1999, these were published by Editura Oscar Print as Elisa Brătianu, Ion IC Brătianu, Memorii involuntare (Elisa Brătianu, Ion IC Brătianu, Involuntary Memories). In 2015, the Art History Publishing House, released volume two of its series Carte de nu-mă-uita (Do Not Forget Me), Memoriile prințesei Elisa Știrbey Brătianu (Memoirs of Princess Elisa Știrbey Brătianu) to mark her 145th birthday.

== Selected works ==
- Brătianu, Elisa I. (1912). Bucura Dumbrava: Pandurul (in Romanian). Bucharest, Romania: Editura Librăriei Scoalelor C. Sfetea. Archived from the original on 2 February 2019.
- Brătianu, Elisa I. (1929). "Les hommes d'Etat pendant la guerre: lettre ouverte à M. William Martin". Indépendance Roumaine (in French). Bucharest, Romania. OCLC 716765184.
- Brătianu, Elisa I. (1933). Compte-rendu sur Peace making, 1919, by Harold Nicolson (in French). Bucharest, Romania: Editura Cartea Romaneasca. OCLC 462386904.
- Brătianu, Elisa I. (1943). Cusaturi romanesti [Romanian Stitches]. Bucharest, Romania: Consiliului Superior al Industriei Casnice.
