= National Liberal Party–Brătianu =

Political party in Romania

National Liberal Party–Brătianu Partidul Național Liberal–Brătianu
- Leader: Gheorghe I. Brătianu
- Founded: 15 June 1930
- Dissolved: 10 January 1938
- Split from: National Liberal Party
- Merged into: National Liberal Party
- Ideology: National liberalism Laissez-faire; Social conservatism
- Political position: Right-wing
- Colours: Beige

The National Liberal Party–Brătianu (Romanian: Partidul Național Liberal-Brătianu, PNL; also known as Georgiști – "Georgists", from the name of their leader, Gheorghe I. Brătianu) was a right-wing political party in Romania, formed as a splinter group from the main liberal faction, the national liberals. For its symbol, PNL-Brătianu chose three vertical bars, placed at equal distance from each other. The Georgists' official voice was Mișcarea, a journal that supported an eponymous publishing house; notably, Mișcarea published art chronicles contributed by the writer Tudor Arghezi.

The National Liberal Party–Brătianu was active between June 15, 1930 and January 10, 1938. Notable members of the group, other than its founder Brătianu, included the historians Ștefan Ciobanu, Constantin C. Giurescu, Scarlat Lambrino, Constantin S. Nicolăescu-Plopşor, Petre P. Panaitescu, Victor Papacostea, and Aurelian Sacerdoţeanu, the geographer Simion Mehedinți, the novelist Mihail Sadoveanu, the actor and poet Mihail Codreanu, the linguist Alexandru Rosetti, the jurist Paul Negulescu, the Romanian Army general Artur Văitoianu, and the lawyer Mihai Antonescu; it was primarily intellectual in appeal, and was especially involved in recruiting members of social and cultural elites, whom it placed at the top of its political hierarchy.

Unlike the main PNL's program of protectionism and selective interventionism, Gheorghe I. Brătianu's party advocated economic liberalism. It fused these ideals with nationalist demands, including, in reference to belonging to the many businesses owned by ethnic minority businessmen, the Romanianization of industry. However, as the Great Depression began to affect Romania, it recommended a government monopoly over the financial market; Its nationalist discourse was itself tempered from inside the group: while welcoming minorities inside its structures, it condemned the far right and antisemitic doctrines (including, notably, the Jewish quota proposed by Romanian Front and the National Christian Party).

== History ==
=== Emergence ===
The clash between Gheorghe I. Brătianu and the main party occurred in 1930, as, in the period following the death of Ion I. C. Brătianu and at the start of Vintilă Brătianu's leadership, the party had lost power to the most important opposition group—the National Peasants' Party (PNŢ)—being crushed in the elections of 1928 (when it obtained only 6.5% of the vote). The PNL had become factionalized over issues related to policy, with the most radical of the new currents being Jean Th. Florescu's Free Man Grouping (after openly attacking Vintilă Brătianu, the latter split in 1931 to create the Liberal Democratic Party).

In Gheorghe I. Brătianu's case, the cause for conflict was his uncle Vintilă's decision to stand by his commitment to the rule of King Mihai I and the Regency (formed around Prince Nicholas of Romania), at the moment when the PNȚ Premier Gheorghe Mironescu had ensured the unexpected return of Carol II (who replaced his son on the throne during the month of June); Gheorghe I. Brătianu, who was head of the Iași County section of the PNL, voiced his full support for the new monarch, and, despite his energetic protests, was soon after excluded from the party. Nevertheless, Vintilă Brătianu and Carol normalized their relations in July, just six months before the former's unexpected death. The main PNL was subsequently led by Ion G. Duca, who was assisted by the future leader of the so-called "young liberals" (supporting both free trade and an authoritarian rule over the country around the king's person), Gheorghe Tătărescu.

=== Pro-German stance ===
In 1933, as Adolf Hitler came to power in Germany, Gheorghe I. Brătianu publicly declared his admiration for him—this partial assimilation of fascism was a discourse also present with several other intellectuals (the historian Nicolae Iorga and the poet Octavian Goga). Duca's premiership, begun in November of the same year, saw an exodus of Georgists back to the PNL, after a failed attempt to have the party itself reunite with the latter. At around the same time, PNL-Brătianu began moving away from supporting the king, as its leader refused to compromise with the camarilla forming around Carol. Gheorghe I. Brătianu turned down multiple offers to become premier, at a time when Carol sought new solutions to combat the rise in popularity of the fascist Iron Guard.

After 1934, Brătianu visited Berlin several times, and began talks with Nazi authorities over the guidelines of Romanian external policies, which he wanted to divert from their focus on a Franco-British alliance (and its Eastern European reflections—the Little Entente and the Polish–Romanian alliance). He was also suspicious of the planned appeasement between Romania and the Soviet Union, and claimed that the Foreign Minister Nicolae Titulescu was campaigning in favour of a pact with Joseph Stalin, which potentially threatened the territorial gains (Greater Romania) by failing to guarantee for Bessarabia and Bukovina. Although he was initially received with interest, Brătianu's plans were ultimately rejected by the Germans, who chose to maintain a closer relationship with Hungary, Romania's rival.

When Duca was assassinated by the Iron Guard on December 30, 1933, Tătărescu's succession to the premiership effectively led to a change in political programs, as the new executive was open to collaboration with Carol. In the new context, Brătianu became an opponent of the monarch, and, in front of Carol's attempts to have the 1923 Constitution amended by authoritarian legislation, was a supporter of legal traditions; the Georgists also expressed reserve towards the outlawing of the Iron Guard, viewing it as a dangerous precedent. The PNL-Brătianu found itself in a bitter rivalry with the "young liberals", whose presence in the forefront blocked all negotiations between the two.

=== Electoral results and reunion with the PNL ===
Present in all but one electoral district by 1933, Brătianu's group won only 6.5% of the vote in the 1932 elections (when it chose not to form any electoral alliance). With just 14 to 16 representatives to the Chamber of Deputies throughout its existence, the Georgists still ranked consistently as the fourth or sixth most successful party in the country. In 1934, together with Alexandru Averescu's People's Party, it created the Constitutional Front, which soon (but briefly) included Mihai Stelescu's Crusade of Romanianism (emerged as an offshoot of the Iron Guard, it disappeared a short while after its leader was assassinated) and Grigore Forțu's minor Citizen Bloc. It disbanded it 1936.

In elections of November 1937, the Georgists joined with the National Peasants' Party and the Iron Guard in the electoral pact that was meant to protect the opposition from all possible interference of the Tătărescu government in the results of the voting. The uniquely indecisive results of the voting allowed Carol to form a loyal executive around the far right National Christian Party and its leaders, Octavian Goga and A. C. Cuza; the Georgists remained in opposition to the new government, and began talks for a reconciliation with the PNL, after the defeated Tătărescu lost ground to the "old liberal" leadership around Dinu Brătianu (the second brother of Ion I. C. and the uncle of Gheorghe). The reunion occurred exactly a month before Carol dismissed the Goga government and, nominally outlawing all parties to create the National Renaissance Front, established his own dictatorship. When Tătărescu chose to back the regime and was expelled, Gheorghe I. Brătianu became replaced his rival as the second most important figure of the semi-clandestine party, and agreed to join the National Peasants' Party in voicing criticism of Carol's authoritarian policies.

== Legacy ==
After the outbreak of World War II, Romania was, despite its neutrality, a target for the hostility of both Germany and the Soviet Union after the Molotov–Ribbentrop Pact (see Romania during World War II). Gheorghe I. Brătianu attempted to determine more Axis sympathy towards Greater Romania's borders by discussing the matter with the German Foreign Minister Joachim von Ribbentrop—consequently, he was placed under surveillance by Siguranţa Statului, on Carol's direct orders. In 1940, Greater Romania was disestablished through the Soviet annexation of Bessarabia and Northern Bukovina, the cession of Northern Transylvania to Hungary, and that of Southern Dobruja to Bulgaria. Although being, as himself later pointed out, "a Germanophile", Gheorghe I. Brătianu signed his name to a protest regarding the German-enforced Arbitration, and later stated that he had "preferred Germany's hostility to its scorn".

In September 1940, the newly created Iron Guard regime (the National Legionary State) offered the PNL places in the government, upon the pressures of Ion Antonescu (who had become Conducător, sharing power with the Guard) and of his assistant, the former Georgist Mihai Antonescu; talks failed due to Brătianu's excessive ambitions, amounting to virtual Liberal control over the executive (according to Z. Ornea, his demand was merely a procedure through which he intended to politely avoid all association with the Guard). When Antonescu's regime joined Germany in its invasion of the Soviet Union (1941), Brătianu was drafted in the Romanian Army, serving as an officer for several months under General Nicolae Mazarini. Supportive of the Bessarabian expedition, he expressed criticism of Romania's Transnistrian conquests.

Starting in 1944, when Romania was placed under Soviet influence, Brătianu's early platform was attacked by the Romanian Communist Party as a sign of fascist influences, and the issue of his support for an alliance with Germany was interpreted in the same sense; it was also alleged that he had been, in fact, an anti-communist volunteer in the war against the Soviets. These accusations were partly the basis for his arrest, and contributed to his death in custody at Sighet prison after the establishment of the Romanian communist regime.

== Electoral history ==
=== Legislative elections ===
Election	Votes	%	Assembly	Senate	Position
1931	173,586	6.1	12 / 387	0 / 108	3rd
1932	195,048	6.7	14 / 387	0 / 108	3rd
1933	147,665	5.1	10 / 387	0 / 108	4th
1937	119,361	3.9	16 / 414	0 / 113	6th
