= Vila Florica =

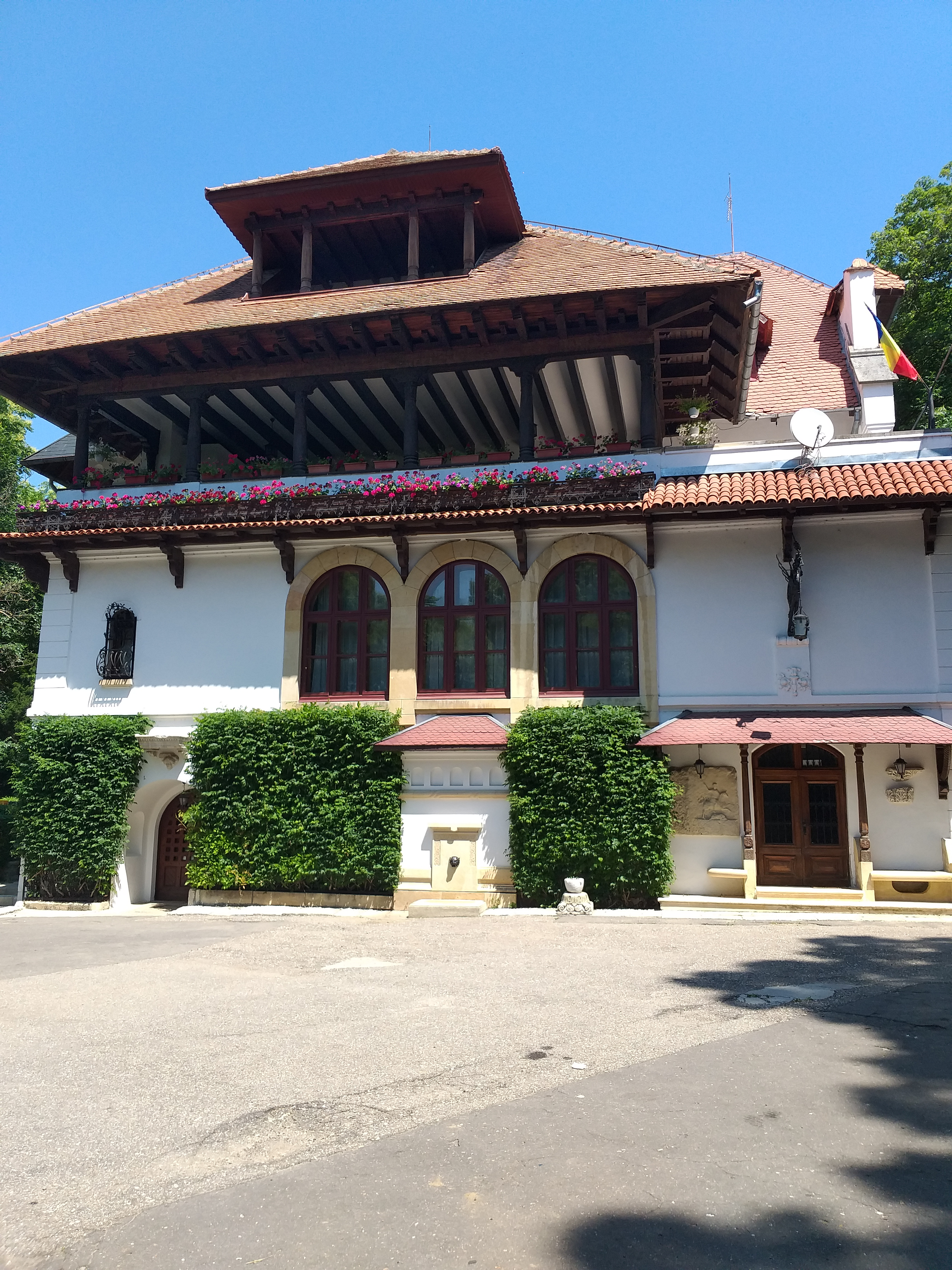
- Alternative names: Conacul Brătianu; Domeniul Florica
- Etymology: Named after Florica, Ion C. Brătianu's first daughter, who died in childhood

General information
- Status: Museum
- Type: Manor / small two-storey palace
- Architectural style: Romanian Revival style
- Classification: Listed historic monument
- Location: Ștefănești, Argeș County, Romania, Strada Ion I.C. Brătianu nr. 37 (formerly Aleea Stațiunii), Ștefănești, Argeș County, postal code 117715, Romania
- Coordinates: 44°52′8″N 24°55′39″E
- Named for: Florica Brătianu
- Years built: 1858 (first house); enlarged and transformed 1905–1912 and 1924–1925
- Construction started: 1858
- Opened: 2020 (as the Brătianu National Museum)
- Owner: Ministry of Culture (Romania), since November 2017

Technical details
- Floor count: Basement, ground floor, two upper floors and an attic; approximately 40 rooms and 14 bathrooms

Design and construction
- Architects: Petre Antonescu (1905–1912 and 1924–1925 works)
- Known for: Principal residence of the Brătianu family

Other information
- Public transit: M4, M6, M6B, M9 bus lines from Pitești; Ion C. Brătianu railway station nearby

Website
- www.muzeulnationalbratianu.ro

Vila Florica is an estate in Ștefănești, Argeș County, Romania, in the Ștefăneștii Noi neighborhood. It was the principal residence of the Brătianu family, a political dynasty that shaped the creation and modernization of the Romanian state. Since 2020 the mansion has housed the Brătianu National Museum.

== History of the estate and the Brătianu family ==
=== Origins and naming ===
The estate's link to the Brătianu family began in 1844, when Ion Constantin Brătianu inherited land in Ștefănești, including the property later known as Florica, from his father. A boyar house is documented on the land as early as 1829, with four rooms and a wine cellar. In 1858 Ion C. Brătianu began enlarging this into "a simple, two-storey winegrower's house" with an open terrace, the structure that grew into the present villa. The villa, and later the surrounding village, took the name "Florica" from Ion C. Brătianu's first daughter, who died young.

=== Architectural evolution ===
The house was substantially rebuilt twice: in 1905–1912, and again in 1924–1925, on plans developed with architect Petre Antonescu, a leading figure of Romanian Revival architecture, a style that emerged in the early 20th century partly as a reaction against the French-influenced Classicist Eclecticism common in Romanian country houses of the period. Antonescu had worked with Ion I. C. Brătianu since the latter's time as minister of public works, and the two later collaborated on Ion I. C. Brătianu's Bucharest residence on Strada Biserica Amzei as well. By this period the estate had grown to include a train station and an astronomical observatory alongside the farm and winery.

=== The Brătianu family's role ===
Florica was the family seat of the Brătianu family, who were among the founders of the National Liberal Party alongside figures such as Ion Ghica and Mihail Kogălniceanu. Ion I. C. Brătianu and his wife Elisa Brătianu used the estate as a retreat after the death of Ion's mother in 1920.

The table below lists the family members most closely associated with Florica:

| Name | Lifespan | Key role/contribution | Connection to Florica |
|---|---|---|---|
| Ion C. Brătianu | 1821–1891 | First president of the National Liberal Party; led the unification of the liberal factions; central figure in the 1848 Revolution, the Union of the Principalities, and the achievement of state independence. Longest-serving prime minister before the communist era. | Inherited Ștefănești in 1844 and built the first house on the estate in 1858. The villa was named Florica after his daughter. |
| Dimitrie Brătianu | 1818–1892 | Politician and diplomat; briefly prime minister of Romania; presided over Carol I's coronation. Co-founded the National Liberal Party. | Co-founder of the National Liberal Party alongside his brother Ion C. Brătianu, whose estate was Florica. |
| Ion I. C. Brătianu | 1864–1927 | Known as "Ionel Brătianu"; led the government for two decades; key figure in the creation of Greater Romania. | Initiated the major architectural transformation of the villa with Petre Antonescu; used Florica as a retreat with his wife Elisa after his mother's death in 1920. |
| Constantin I. C. Brătianu | 1866–1950 | Known as "Dinu Brătianu"; led the National Liberal Party after his brothers' deaths; died in Sighet prison. | Last private owner of the villa before expropriation. |
| Vintilă Brătianu | 1867–1930 | Developed the "prin noi înșine" ("through ourselves") economic principle that shaped the National Liberal Party's interwar financial policy. | Member of the Brătianu family, whose principal residence was Florica. |
| Elisa Brătianu | 1870–1957 | Wife of Ion I. C. Brătianu; supported traditional Romanian textile crafts, including the "Albina" workshop and a seamstresses' school in Ștefănești; was instrumental in founding the foundation that preserved her husband's papers. | Managed the estate's gardens before shifting her focus to the Ion I.C. Brătianu Cultural Foundation. |

== Architecture and interior design ==
=== Architectural style and evolution ===
The rebuilt mansion is generally described as an example of the Romanian Revival style, drawing on traditional Romanian peasant houses and religious architecture rather than the Western Classicism favored by other Romanian country houses of the period; characteristic features associated with the style include loggias, trilobed arches, wooden pillars and tiled roofs, sometimes likened to a small medieval fortress. The building is listed as a historic monument, though sources disagree on the exact classification code (see infobox note above).

=== Exterior features ===
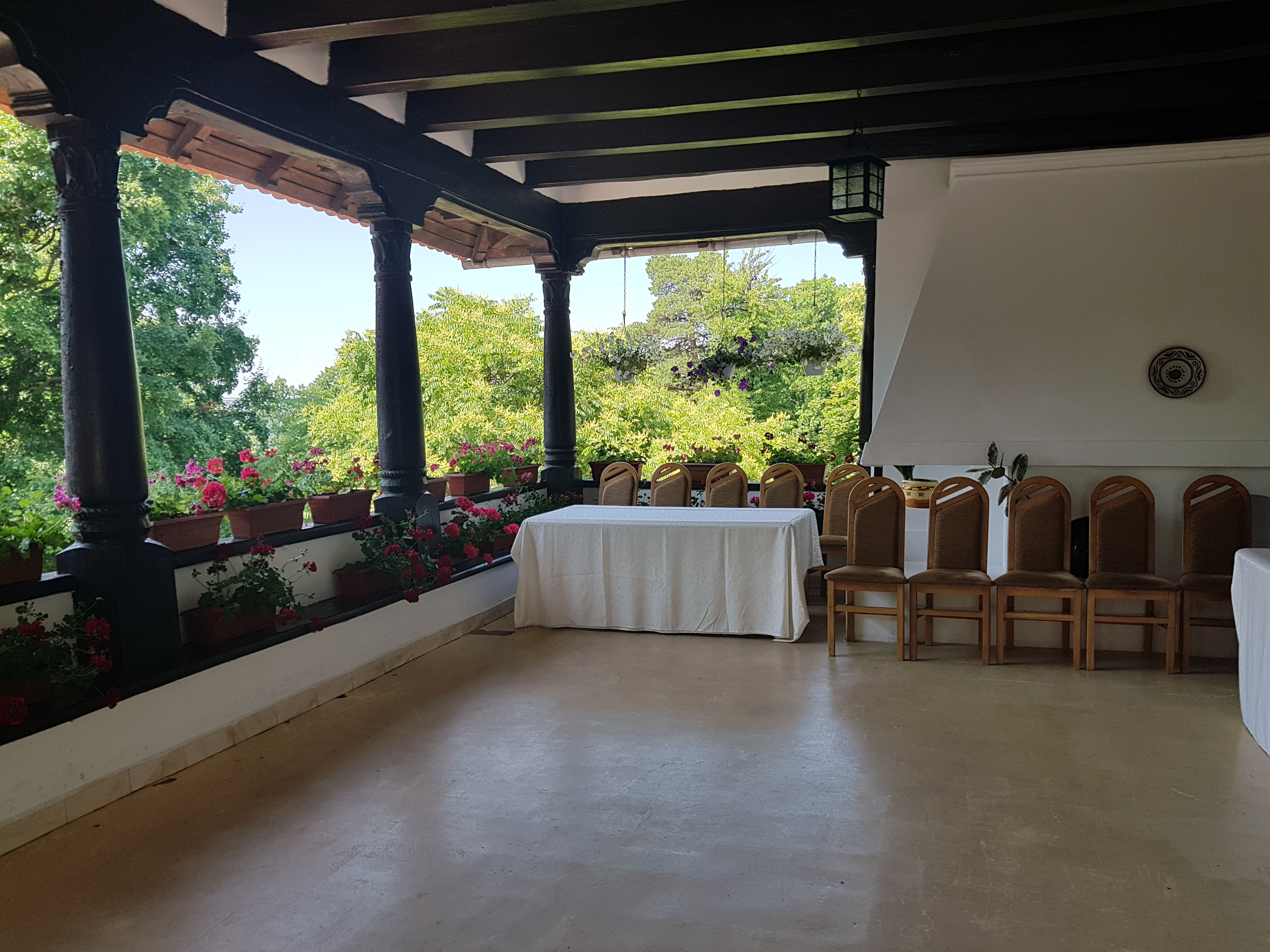
Terrace

The house is sometimes described as a "small two-storey palace." A semi-covered terrace opens off the first-floor library and overlooks the surrounding park; it held a large stove used for heating food and family meals, and its original doors have heavy locking mechanisms. Potted geraniums line the balcony. A second, smaller terrace opens from Ionel Brătianu's second-floor office and faces Pitești. A tower near the house, built with a somewhat fortress-like appearance, housed the villa's electricity generator.

=== Interior spaces and collections ===
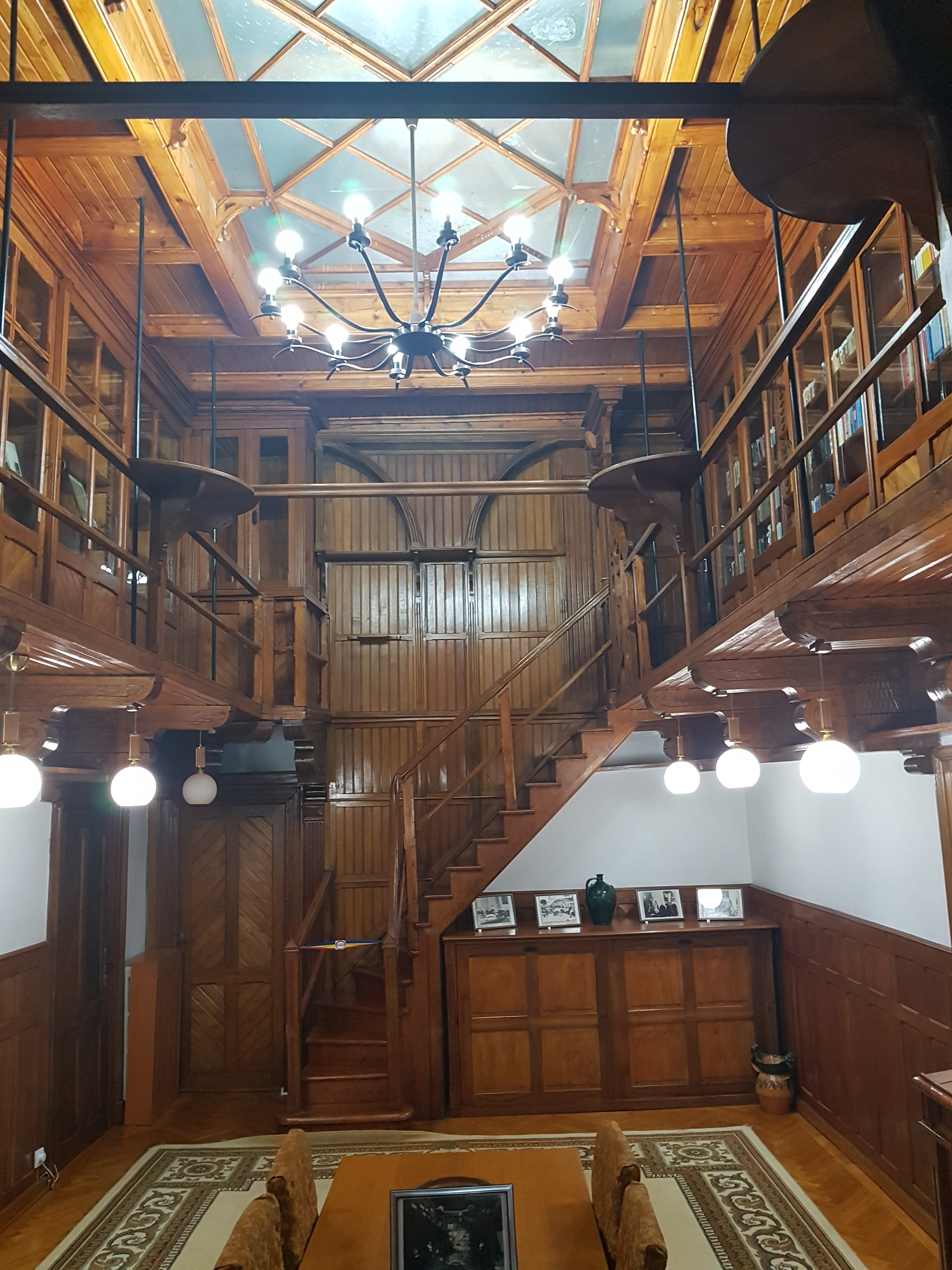
The "suspended library of Ionel Brătianu"

The interior spans the basement, ground floor, and two upper floors, covering about 2,324 square metres built and roughly 1,774 square metres of usable space. Tours typically begin in the Reception Hall (Salonul de primire), one of the largest rooms, furnished with solid wood pieces under a coffered wooden ceiling decorated with small ceramic ornaments.

The Fumoir Lounge (Salonul Fumoir) holds 20th-century oriental furniture and Transylvanian ceramics, along with a suitcase that belonged to Ion I. C. Brătianu. It also housed part of the family's libraries, most of which — reportedly tens of thousands of volumes — were destroyed under the communist regime. The Tea Room (Salonul de ceai), furnished simply in a 19th-century Western style, served family gatherings and conversations. A ground-floor room dedicated to folk costumes functions as an ethnographic museum, displaying folk costumes and Romanian textiles. The German Furniture Lounge (Salonul cu mobilier german) is more spacious, with simple German furniture and a round cherry-wood table set with eight ornamented plates. The Turkish Lounge (Salonul turcesc) has hookahs, low cushioned seating and other oriental objects typical of wealthy households of the period.

The villa's libraries once held tens of thousands of volumes; many were burned by the communist authorities after 1948. The "suspended library of Ionel Brătianu" is treated as a standout piece, with its core collection tracing back to books Ion C. Brătianu bought in Paris and catalogued himself.

Ionel Brătianu's office, on the top floor, holds a large framed family tree and an imposing desk. Period furniture, original documents, medals, decorations, photographs and informational panels about the family are displayed throughout the museum, along with busts of Ion C. Brătianu, King Carol I and Queen Elisabeth and royal portraits. A granite bust of Ionel Brătianu, weighing about a tonne and a half, stands at the entrance; it was reportedly kept hidden from the communist authorities for more than four decades before being brought to Florica.

== Estate grounds and ancillary structures ==
=== Gardens and landscape ===
Ion C. Brătianu laid out an extensive park on the estate, which he named "Semiramis' Gardens," reflecting a personal enthusiasm for tree-planting. Elisa Brătianu, herself an avid gardener, was later put in charge of the gardens by Ion I. C. Brătianu; this reportedly put her at odds with Ion's sister Sabina, who regarded the gardens as their mother's legacy, and Elisa is said to have shifted her focus to cultural-foundation work as a result.

=== Brătianu Chapel ===
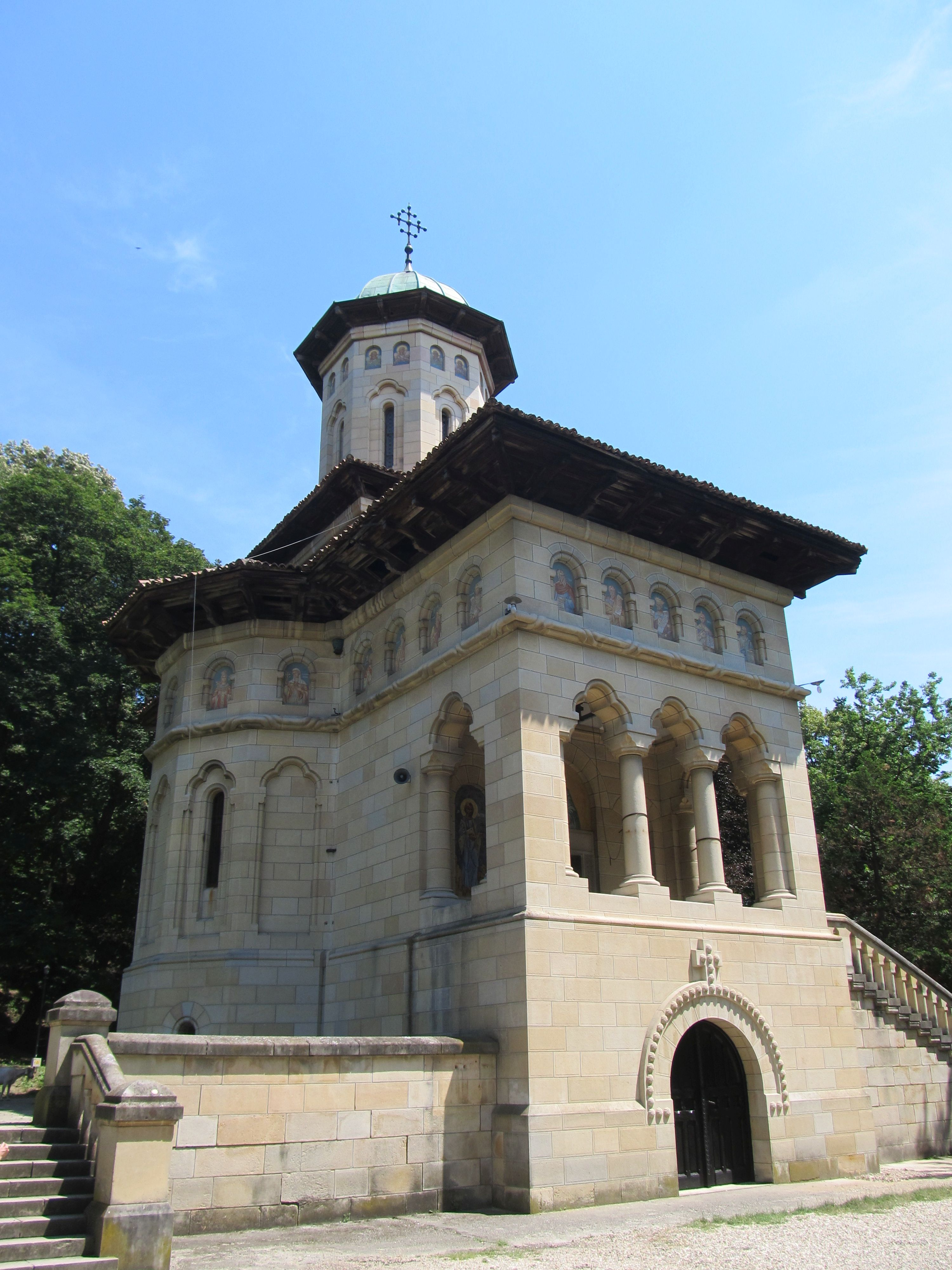
The Brătianu Chapel

The funerary chapel, dedicated to the Nativity of Saint John the Baptist, is dated by some sources to 1898 and by others to its completion in 1912. It serves as the main burial place for the Brătianu family: the sub-level chapel holds two large black-marble tombs, of Ion C. Brătianu and Ion I. C. Brătianu, with a side room for other family members' graves. The chapel is cared for by nuns from the nearby Florica Hermitage, and is opened with a large old metal key.

=== The Wooden Church of Albac at Florica ===
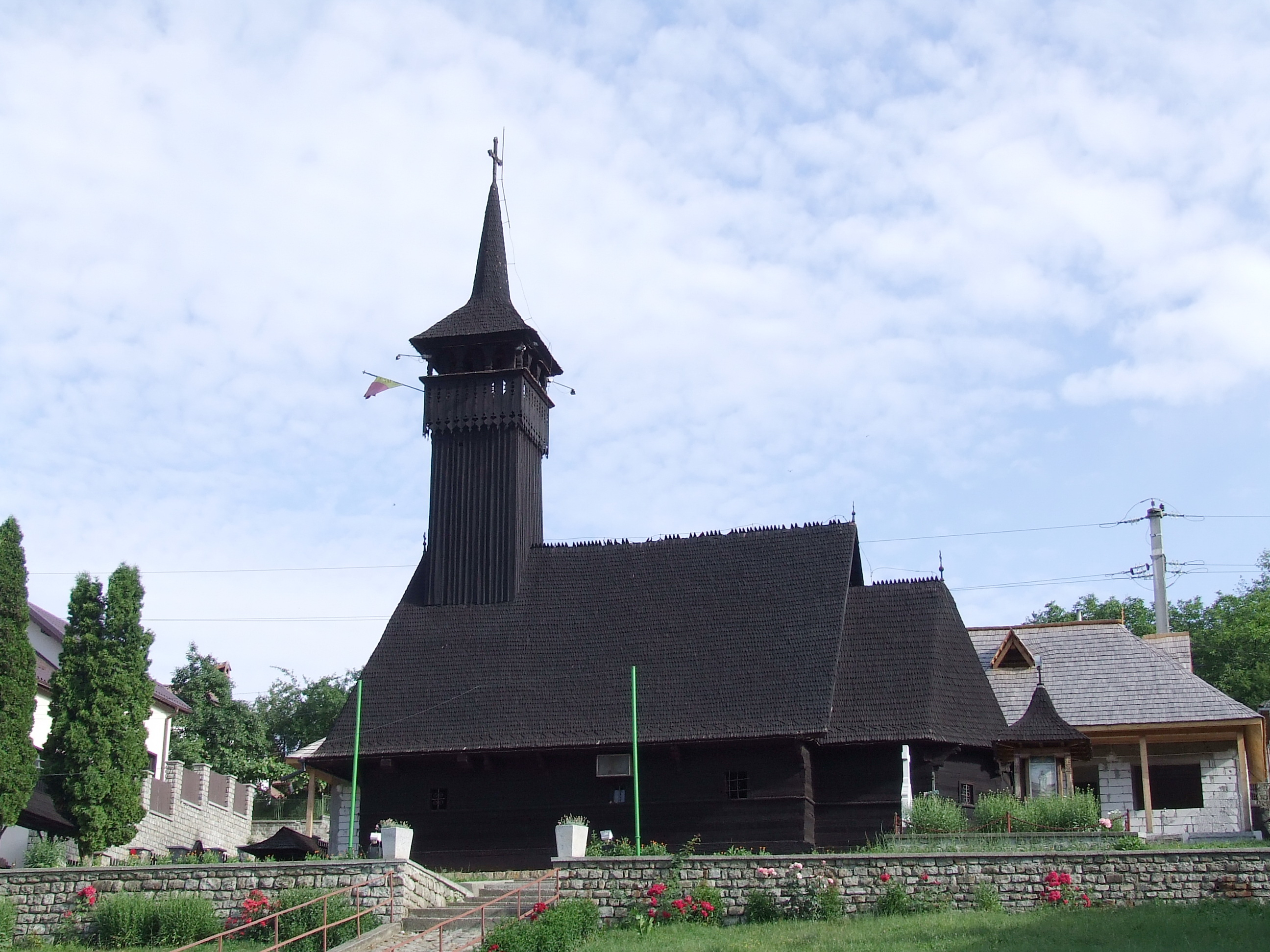
The Albac Church at Băile Olănești, where it was moved in 1954 after having stood at the Florica estate

A distinctive addition to the estate was a small wooden church originally built in Albac, a village in the Apuseni Mountains of Alba County, in 1745–1746. Constructed from thick timber beams joined at the corners without nails, in a traditional dovetail technique, the church was dedicated to the Holy Archangels but became popularly known as "Horea's Church," for its association with Horea, leader of the 1784 Transylvanian peasant uprising, who was said to have prayed there.

By the early 20th century the church in Albac was derelict and faced demolition under the Austro-Hungarian administration of Transylvania. During his first journey through the Apuseni Mountains in 1907, Ion I. C. Brătianu, then interior minister in the government of Dimitrie A. Sturdza, learned of its fate and purchased it with his own funds. The carpenter Nicolae of Sohodol and his assistants dismantled the structure beam by beam—declared as firewood to circumvent Austro-Hungarian restrictions—and transported it by sledge to the railway station at Turda and then by special freight cars into the Kingdom of Romania, where it was rebuilt on a new foundation on the hill at Florica in 1908. Already nicknamed the "traveling little church," it is considered by some sources to be the first Transylvanian wooden church preserved as a historic monument in Romania.

The church's move to Florica inspired the poet Octavian Goga, who visited the estate in 1908 and wrote a poem about it titled "Bisericuța din Albac"; the poem, alongside a portrait of Horea, still flanks the church's entrance at its present site. Its dedicatory inscription, composed after the Florica reconstruction, records that the church was formally consecrated only in May 1941, fulfilling a wish Ion I. C. Brătianu had expressed before his death in 1927—that it be dedicated to the memory of the countless Romanians who had sacrificed themselves for the nation.

Following Brătianu's death the church was again neglected and stood abandoned through the Second World War. In 1954, Patriarch Justinian of the Romanian Orthodox Church found the building unused and deteriorating at Florica and ordered its relocation to Băile Olănești, in Vâlcea County, where it was reassembled in its original form from the same timber, given new interior paintings, and reconsecrated on 12 October 1958; it remains there today, still known as "Horea's Church." At Florica, the spot where it once stood, near the "La Vulturi" sculptural group, is now marked by a memorial altar cross.

=== "La Vulturi" sculptural group ===
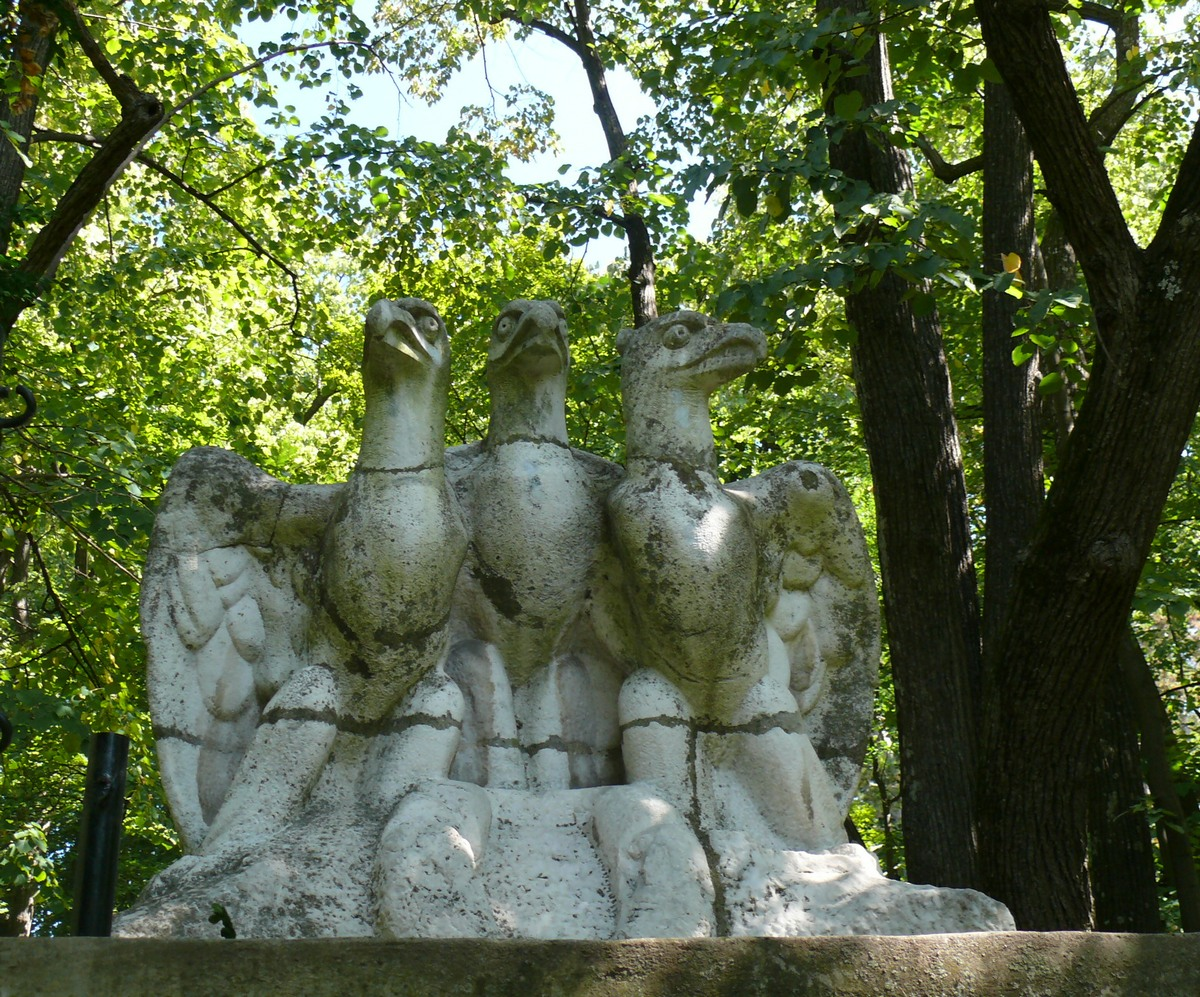
“La Vulturi”

A white-marble sculptural group by the Croatian sculptor Ivan Meštrović stands in the park, showing three eagles looking in different directions. According to the museum's own account, oral tradition links the eagles to the three Brătianu brothers — Ion I. C. Brătianu, Constantin (Dinu) Brătianu and Vintilă Brătianu — and dates the work to the late 1930s, though no documented commission date survives. The sculpture was removed during the communist period but not destroyed, and was restored to its original site in 1991, after the Romanian Revolution. As of 2023, the sculptural group was reported closed to visitors.

=== Other estate components ===
Beyond the main house, the domain included a working farm, a winery, a railway station (Ion C. Brătianu Railway Station, formerly Florica and Ștefănești-Argeș Railway Station) and an astronomical observatory. The farm's outbuildings served varied purposes: some stored plants over winter, others housed the electricity and water-pumping machinery and various workshops, and one held a small telescope observatory. Several hundred hectares of vineyard surrounded the estate, managed mainly by Ion C. Brătianu; the family sold Florica wine domestically and abroad — including a bulk export arrangement with a French buyer in 1890 — and its butter and cheese were also sold commercially, reportedly praised by King Carol I.

== Expropriation and post-communist restoration ==
=== Communist expropriation ===
After 1948 the Florica estate was nationalized and the Ion I.C. Brătianu Cultural Foundation ceased to exist. Books and furniture were forcibly removed from the mansion, with some sources stating that numerous books were burned. Elisa Brătianu was evicted and her property expropriated. Dinu Brătianu, the villa's last private owner, was arrested without trial at age 84 and died in Sighet prison in 1950. During the 1950s the house took in political refugees from the Greek Civil War, and the surrounding village was renamed "Partizanii," a name it held from 1950 until 1964, when it reverted to Ștefăneștii Noi.

=== Post-communist restoration ===
By the 1970s the house had been restored and refurnished as a state guesthouse. In 1993 the Ministry of Culture established the Brătianu Cultural Center at Florica, and administration passed to the Argeș County Council in 2003. The Brătianu heirs recovered ownership through restitution in 2013. In November 2017 the Ministry of Culture bought the property from the heirs, exercising the Romanian state's right of pre-emption; the County Council continued to administer the site under a loan agreement until December 2019, when it reverted to the Ministry, which went on to establish the Brătianu National Museum there.

== Brătianu National Museum ==
=== Establishment and mission ===
The Brătianu National Museum was established by Law no. 15/2020 and opened inside Vila Florica that year. Its mandate, as set out in the founding legislation, is to publicize the Brătianu family's contribution to Romanian culture, history and the formation of modern and Greater Romania, and to build a documentation department that collects books, photographs and papers related to the family and supports related publications. As of the sources available, the museum's collection includes 74 classified cultural heritage items.

=== Exhibits and educational objectives ===
The museum tour covers period furniture, original documents, medals, decorations, photographs and informational panels on the family's history. Individual rooms are dedicated to family members including Constantin (Dinu) I.C. Brătianu, Vintilă I.C. Brătianu and Gheorghe I. Brătianu. A second-floor screening room shows films about Ion I. C. Brătianu. The ethnographic section, associated with Elisa Brătianu, covers folk costumes, ceramics and embroidery.

== Cultural and historical legacy ==
The Brătianu family's political role — three prime ministers across three generations, and a central part in Romanian independence, the 1918 unification, and the interwar liberal governments — is the museum's organizing theme, and Vila Florica is presented, in the museum's own framing, as the birthplace of Romanian liberal and monarchist political culture.
