= Dincă Brătianu =

Romanian boyar and politician

Constantin Brătianu (born 1768, 1788 or 1795 in Curtea de Argeș; Principality of Wallachia; died February 10, 1844 in Tigveni near Pitești, Wallachia), also known as "Dincă" (from Constandin, a more seldom transcription of the originally Cyrillic written name), was a Romanian boyar and politician. He was the father of the Romanian Prime Ministers Dumitru Brătianu and Ion Brătianu.

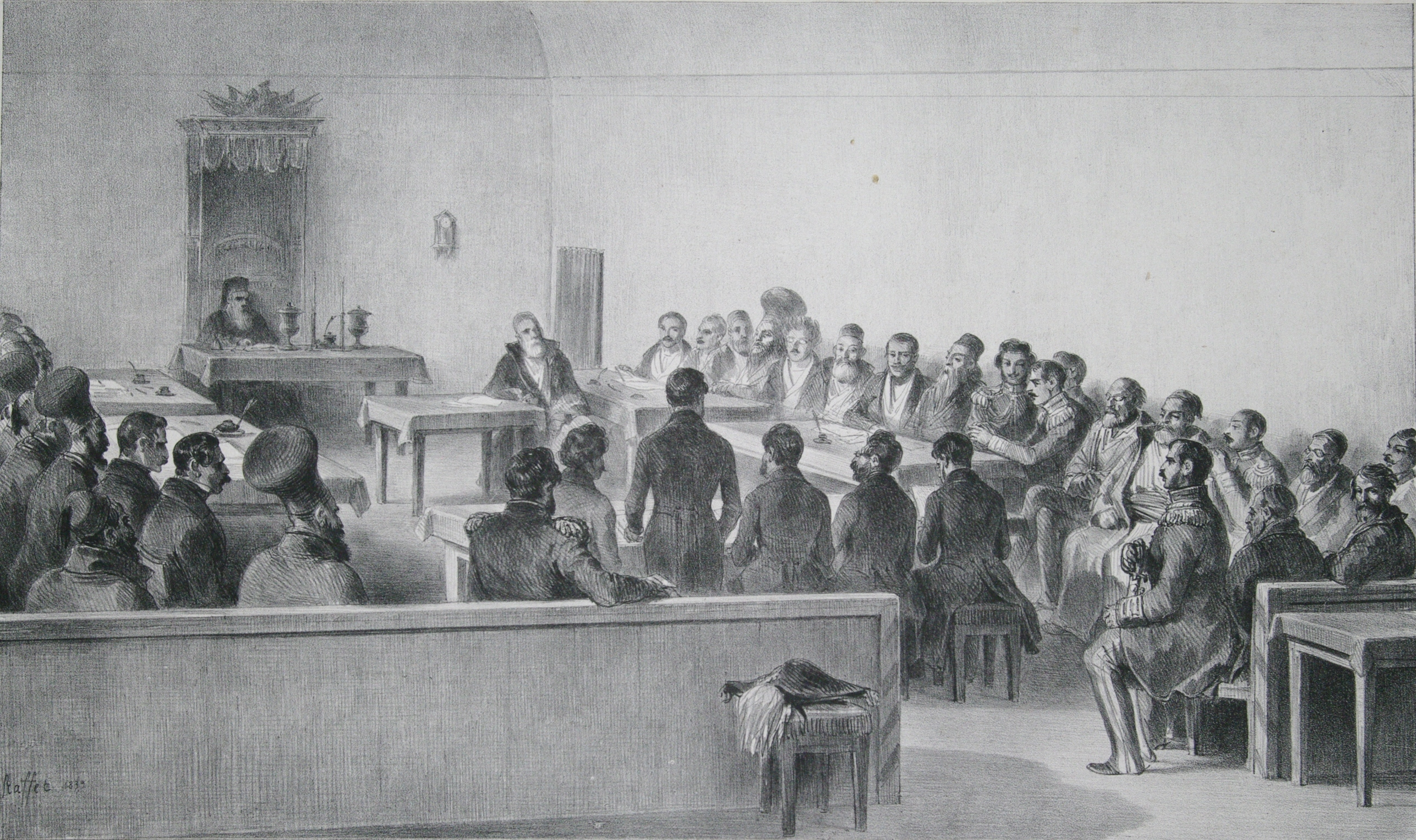
By the Organic Regulation a "parliament" of boyars was installed in Bucharest and Constantin "Dincă" Brătianu became one of its deputates

There are different legends about the origin of the Brătianus. According especially to national liberal historians and politicians (e. g. Constantin's granddaughter Sabina Brătianu-Cantacuzino, Constantin's great-grandson Gheorghe Brătianu or Ion Duca) the female line of the family history goes back to the Vlădescu boyars of the Argeș County. By the end of the 18th century Constantin's father Iane (or Ene) Brătianu, a minor boyar (Șătrar), has married into the Vlădescu family. However, contrary to that, a certain Dr. Georgiyev, linguist at Oriental Academy of Vienna, claimed that Constantin Brătianu has been of Bulgarian descent and immigrated from Gorna Oryahovitsa (in the Turkish ruled Northern Bulgaria) into Wallachia (Note: This allegation was published in 1916, just at the moment when Austria-Hungary and Bulgaria were at war with Romania. Probably, it was war propaganda to discredit the Romanian prime minister Ionel Brătianu (who was a son of Ion and grandson of Constantin Brătianu).) not before the Russo-Turkish wars when Wallachia was temporarily occupied by the Russians. Following another Russo-Turkish war Wallachia was occupied again and the Organic Regulation was imposed there. Based on that Regulament the Russians installed a parliament-like assembly of boyars. From 1831 on Constantin Brătianu, meanwhile the wealthiest of all boyars of the county, represented Argeș in the Wallachian assembly. Additionally in 1835 he became the county administrator of Argeș and in 1839 the Wallachian prince Alexandru Dimitrie Ghica honored him with the rank of a clucer. Allegedly until that time Constantin Brătianu was "knowing neither how to write nor to read, barely even able to sign his name". (Instead of reading or writing Romanian, according to the Viennian linguist, Brătianu still spoke Bulgarian.)

With his wife Anastasia (also called Anica or Sica) Tigveanu, who died in 1838 (or 1839), Constantin Brătianu had three sons and four daughters. The oldest son (Teodor) became a general. Despite their boyaric origin, the two other sons (Dumitru and Ion) founded the National Liberal Party (Partidul Național Liberal) to end the rule of the conservative boyar's party – at least until the moment, when Dumitru allied himself with the boyar's party to overthrow his brother Ion.
