= Vintilă Brătianu =

Romanian politician (1867–1930)

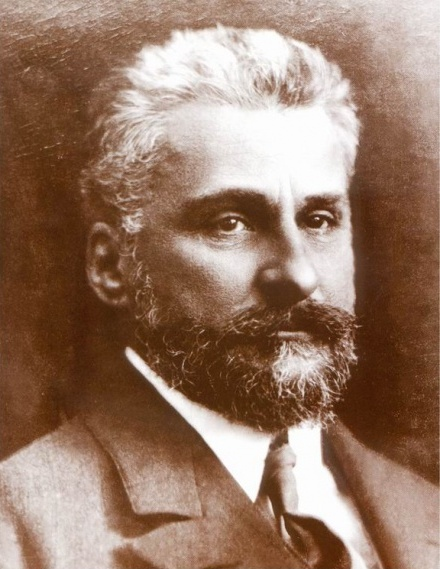

Prime Minister of Romania
- In office 24 November 1927 – 9 November 1928
- Monarch: Michael I
- Preceded by: Ion I. C. Brătianu
- Succeeded by: Iuliu Maniu

Minister of Finance
- In office 22 June 1927 – 3 November 1928
- Preceded by: Mihai Popovici
- Succeeded by: Mihai Popovici

Minister of War
- In office 15 August 1916 – 19 July 1917
- Preceded by: Ion I. C. Brătianu
- Succeeded by: Constantin Iancovescu

Mayor of Bucharest
- In office June 1907 – February 1910
- Preceded by: C. Costescu Comăneanu
- Succeeded by: Procop Ion Dumitrescu

Personal details
- Born: Vintilă Ion Constantin Brătianu; September 16, 1867 Ștefănești, Argeș County, Romania
- Died: December 22, 1930 (aged 66) Râmnicu Vâlcea, Kingdom of Romania
- Party: National Liberal Party
- Spouse: Lia Stolojan
- Children: Vintilă V. Brătianu
- Parent(s): Ion C. Brătianu, Pia Brătianu
- Education: École Centrale Paris
- Profession: engineer

Vintilă Ion Constantin Brătianu (Romanian pronunciation: [vinˈtilə brətiˈanu]; 16 September 1867 – 22 December 1930) was a Romanian politician who served as Prime Minister of Romania between 24 November 1927 and 9 November 1928. He and his brothers Ion I. C. Brătianu and Dinu Brătianu were the leaders of the National Liberal Party of Romania, founded by their father, Ion C. Brătianu.

== Biography ==
Born at his family's estate of Florica, in Ștefănești, Argeș County, Vintilă Brătianu started his studies at Saint Sava High School in Bucharest. He then went to France to study engineering at École Centrale Paris from 1886 to 1890. After returning to Romania, he entered politics.

From 1907 to 1911 he was Mayor of Bucharest. During World War I, he was Minister of War (15 August 1916 – 19 July 1917) and then Minister for War Munitions.

1928: Prime Minister Vintilă Brătianu meeting with the Jewish leaders Jacob Itzhak Niemirower (left) and Yehuda Leib Tsirelson (right)

After the war, he served as Finance Minister (19 January 1922 – 9 March 1926) in the Liberal government led by his brother, Ion. After his brother died on 24 November 1927, he assumed the post of Prime Minister of Romania until he was forced to resign a year later to allow the new National Peasants' Party government of Iuliu Maniu to take office. In November 1927 he also assumed the presidency of the National Liberal Party; he remained in that position until the end of his life.

On 22 December 1930 Brătianu was at his estate in Mihăești, Vâlcea, when he had a stroke of apoplexy which paralyzed his left side; he died that evening at the hospital in nearby Râmnicu Vâlcea. He is buried at the family estate, Florica, in a crypt where also lie his father Ion C. Brătianu and his brother Ion I. C. Brătianu, as well as his other brother, Dinu Brătianu, and his nephew, Gheorghe I. Brătianu, both of whom died in the early 1950s at Sighet Prison.

== See also ==
- Brătianu family

== Gallery ==
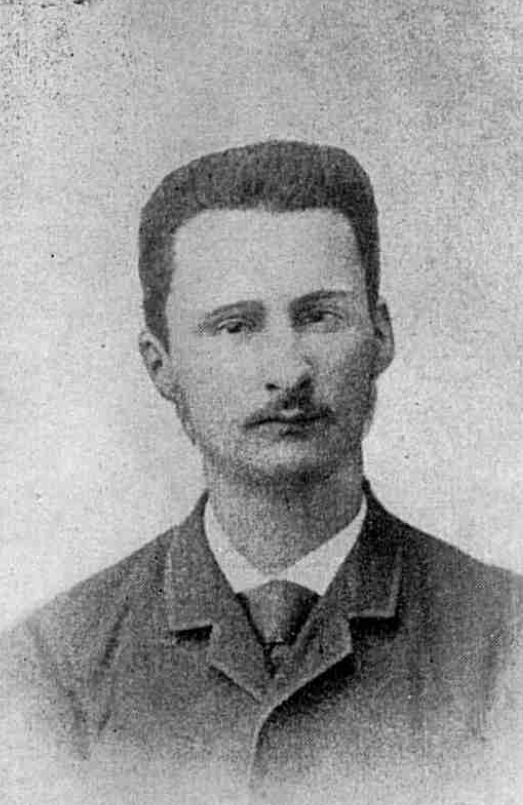

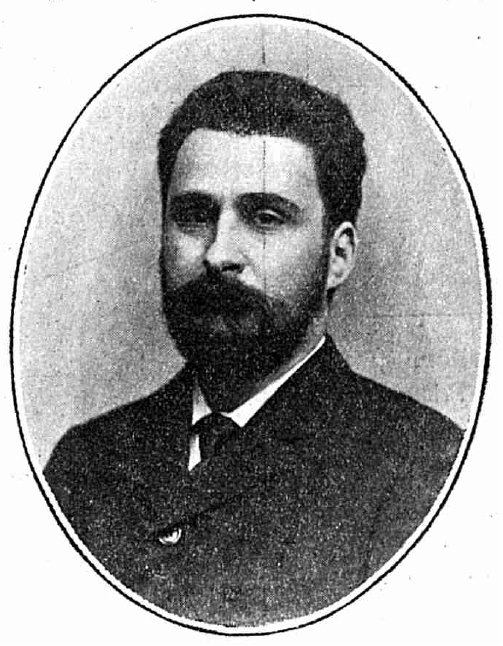

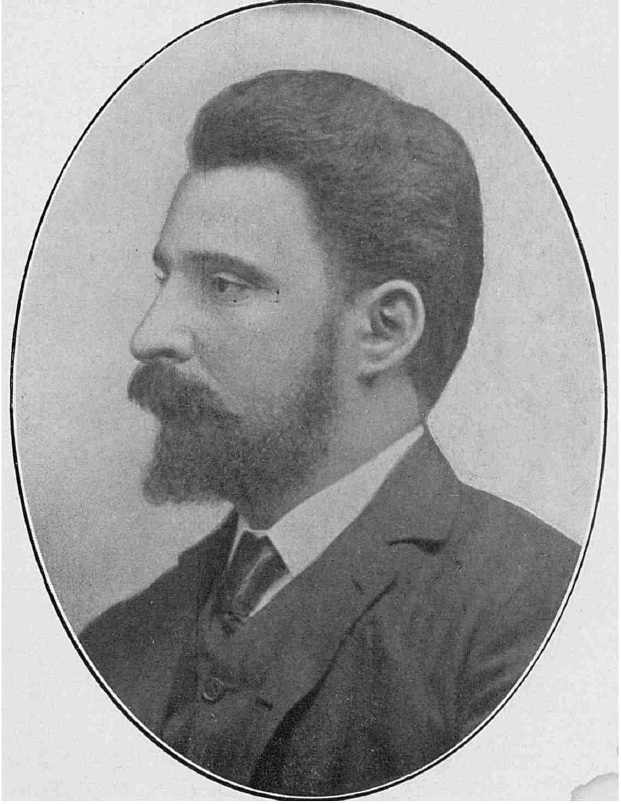

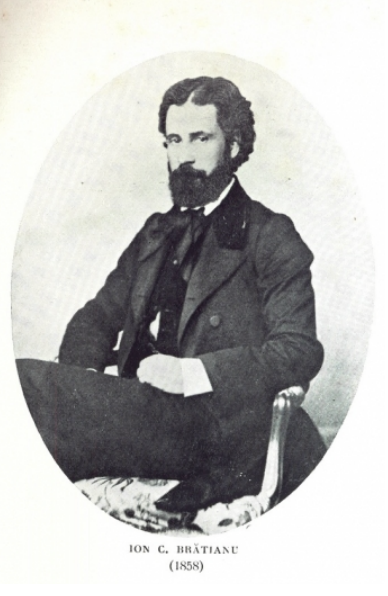

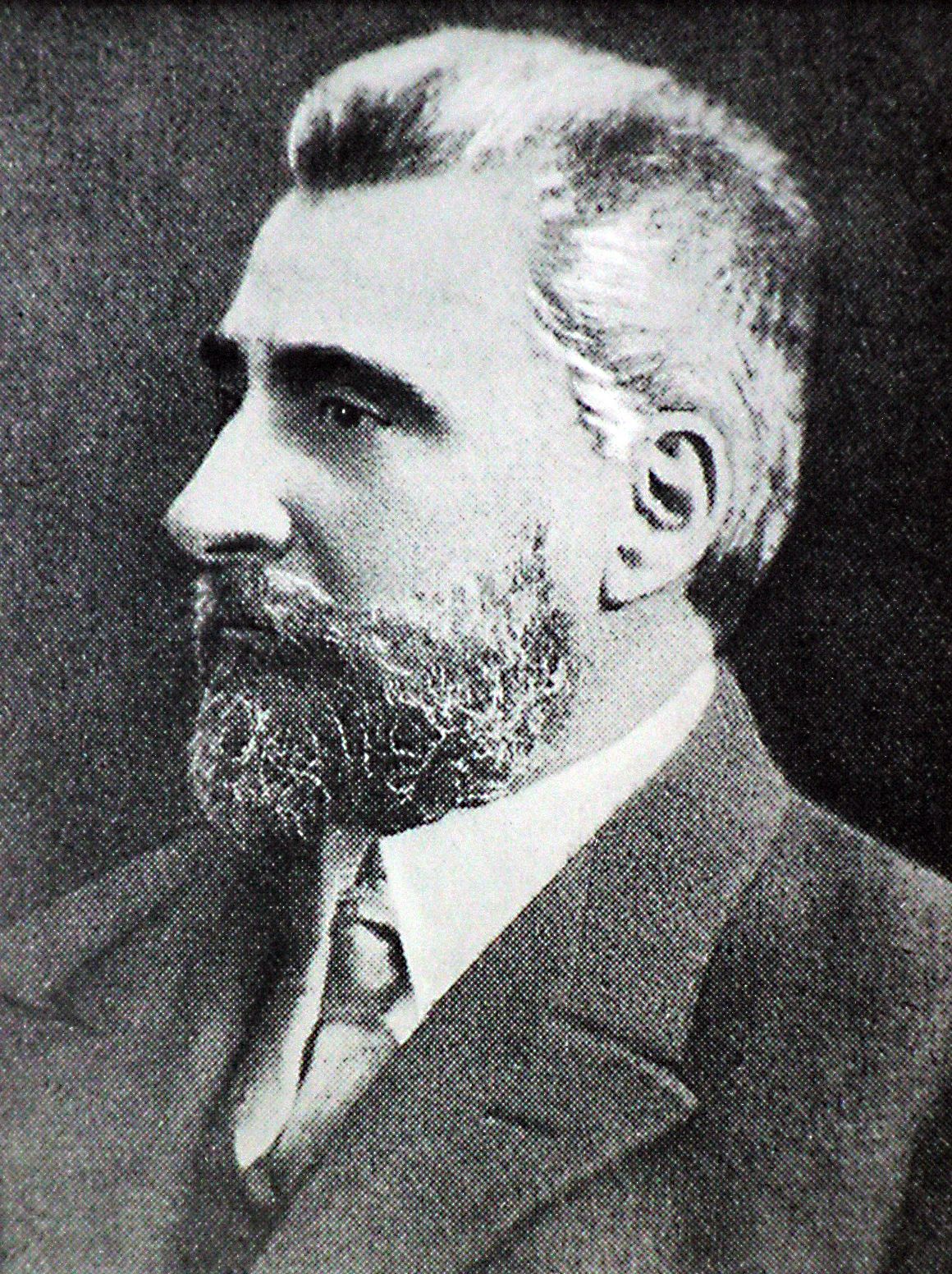
