= Constantin Brătianu (professor) =

Romanian professor

- Born: December 12, 1946
- Occupations: Organizational and management scientist and academic

Academic background
- Education: Diploma in Engineering; M.S., Nuclear Engineering; Ph.D., Nuclear Engineering; Ph.D. Management
- Alma mater: Polytechnic University of Bucharest; Georgia Institute of Technology; Bucharest University of Economic Studies

Constantin Brătianu (born 12 December 1946) is an organizational and management scientist and an academic. He is an emeritus professor at Bucharest University of Economic Studies.

Brătianu's research focuses on knowledge management and its applications in organizational settings.

== Education ==
Brătianu received an Engineering Diploma from the Polytechnic Institute of Bucharest in Romania in 1970. Following this, he completed his Master's in 1977 from the Georgia Institute of Technology and subsequently completed his Ph.D. in 1980. He obtained another Ph.D. in Management in 2002 from the Bucharest University of Economic Studies.

== Career ==
After receiving his undergraduate degree, Brătianu remained at the Polytechnic Institute of Bucharest as teaching staff until 1976. In 1981, he returned to the Polytechnic Institute of Bucharest (later renamed to the Polytechnic University of Bucharest) as faculty, serving as an assistant professor (1981-1989) and later, an associate professor (1990-1991). He then became a full professor there in 1996 and held that role until 2005. Between 2005 and 2011, he was a professor at the UNESCO Department of Business Administration at the Bucharest University of Economic Studies.

At the Ministry of Higher Education, he held two terms as director general of Higher Education and Scientific Research, the first from 1998 to 2001 and the second as director general of Higher Education in 2005.

Brătianu is the founder of the journal Management & Marketing - Challenges for the Knowledge Society and editor-in-chief of the Management Dynamics in the Knowledge Economy.

== Research ==
Brătianu's early research was focused on engineering where he discussed finite element methods and his later research was focused on knowledge management and organizational learning. His work has examined how organizations create, share, transfer, and convert knowledge, and how these processes influence strategic performance. He also explored the definition and history of knowledge and proposed definitions for its use in management.

Brătianu's research has explored knowledge theories, wherein he proposed three fields of knowledge, and theorized a Knowledge Dynamics Framework. He developed the entropic intellectual capital model, which conceptualizes intellectual capital as a dynamic system shaped by interactions among cognitive, emotional, and spiritual knowledge fields. Within this framework, intellectual capital represents both potential and operational capabilities that enable adaptation, learning, and innovation.

Brătianu's work has also investigated how organizations can design and implement knowledge strategies in turbulent and uncertain environments. He emphasized the need for organizations to utilize their knowledge assets to be successful. Beyond theoretical contributions, he has applied his models empirically, including studies on entrepreneurial intent among Romanian students using the Theory of Planned Behavior, and analyses of corporate values and employee behavior in U.S. companies.

== Awards and honors ==
- 1985 – Traian Vuia Award, Romanian Academy of Sciences
- 2020 – Business Systems Laboratory Award, B.S. LAB
- 2020 to 2025 – 8th in Knowledge Management, ScholarGPS
- 2022 to 2025 – Top 2% Scientists, Stanford University

== Bibliography ==
=== Books ===
- Brătianu, Constantin (2015). Organizational knowledge dynamics: managing knowledge creation, acquisition, sharing, and transformation. IGI Global. ISBN 9781466683181.
- Bolisani, Ettore; Brătianu, Constantin (2018). Emergent Knowledge Strategies: Strategic Thinking in Knowledge Management. Springer. ISBN 9783319606576.
- Brătianu, Constantin (2022). Knowledge strategies. Cambridge University Press. ISBN 9781108864237.
- Brătianu, Constantin; Handzic, Meliha; Bolisani, Ettore, eds. (2023). The Future of Knowledge Management: Reflections from the 10th Anniversary of the International Association of Knowledge Management (IAKM) (1st ed.). Springer. ISBN 9783031386961.
- Brătianu, Constantin; Garcia-Perez, Alexeis; Dal Mas, Francesca; Bedford, Denise A. D. (2024). Knowledge translation (First ed.). Emerald Publishing. ISBN 9781803828893.

=== Selected articles ===
- Shook, Christopher L.; Bratianu, Constantin (2010). "Entrepreneurial intent in a transitional economy: an application of the theory of planned behavior to Romanian students". International Entrepreneurship and Management Journal. 6 (2): 231–247. doi:10.1007/s11365-008-0091-2.
- Bratianu, Constantin (2011). "Changing paradigm for knowledge metaphors from dynamics to thermodynamics". Systems Research and Behavioral Science. 28 (2): 160–169. doi:10.1002/sres.1080.
- Bolisani, Ettore; Bratianu, Constantin (2017). "Knowledge strategy planning: an integrated approach to manage uncertainty, turbulence, and dynamics". Journal of Knowledge Management. 21 (2): 233–253. doi:10.1108/JKM-02-2016-0071.
- Bolisani, Ettore; Bratianu, Constantin (2018). "The Elusive Definition of Knowledge". Emergent Knowledge Strategies. Knowledge Management and Organizational Learning. Vol. 4. pp. 1–22. doi:10.1007/978-3-319-60657-6_1. ISBN 978-3-319-60656-9.
- Bolisani, Ettore; Bratianu, Constantin (2018). "The Emergence of Knowledge Management". Emergent Knowledge Strategies. Knowledge Management and Organizational Learning. Vol. 4. pp. 23–47. doi:10.1007/978-3-319-60657-6_2. ISBN 978-3-319-60656-9.
- Bratianu, Constantin; Bejinaru, Ruxandra (2019). "The Theory of Knowledge Fields: A Thermodynamics Approach". Systems. 7 (2): 20. doi:10.3390/systems7020020.
- Bratianu, Constantin; Bejinaru, Ruxandra (2020). "Knowledge dynamics: a thermodynamics approach". Kybernetes. 49 (1): 6–21. doi:10.1108/K-02-2019-0122.
