= Ștefănești, Argeș =

Ștefănești
- Town
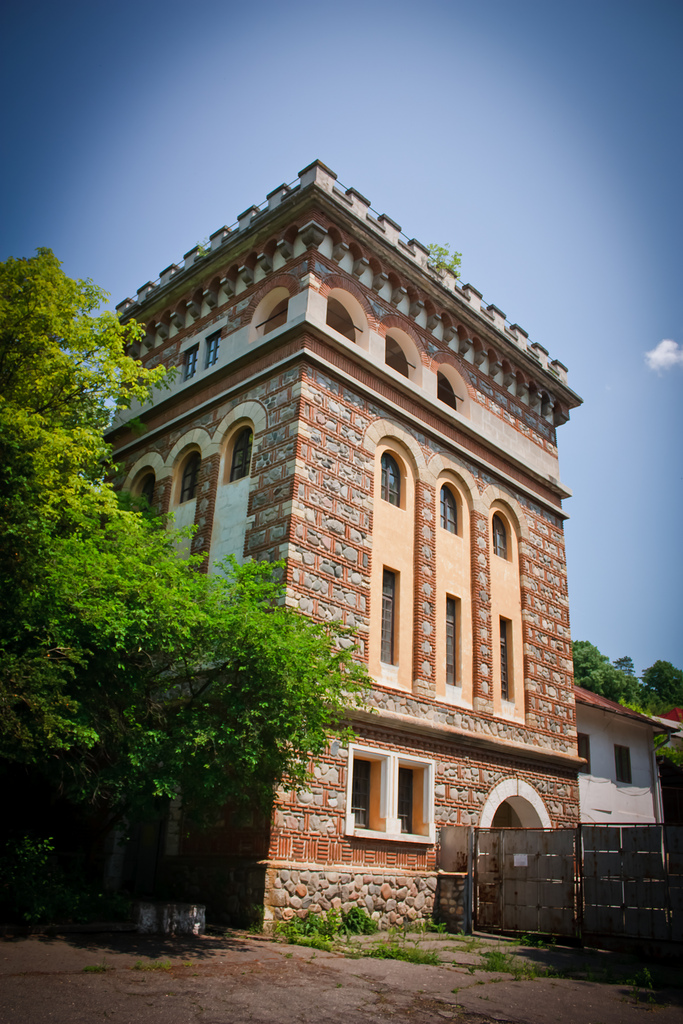
- Florica mansion of the Brătianu family in Ștefănești

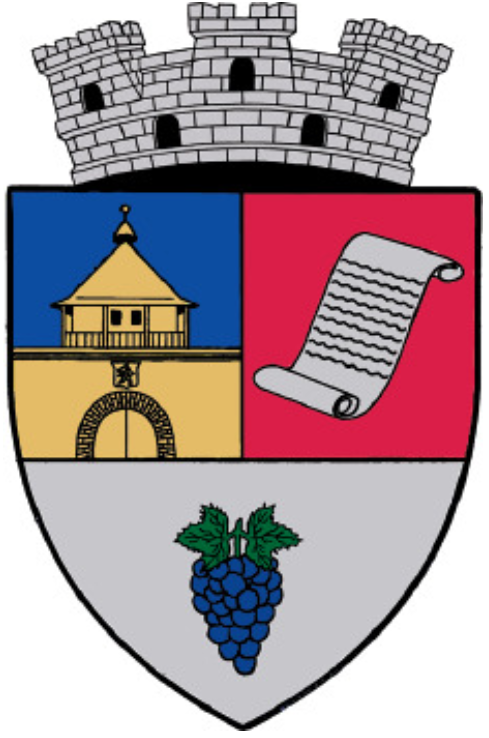
- Coat of arms

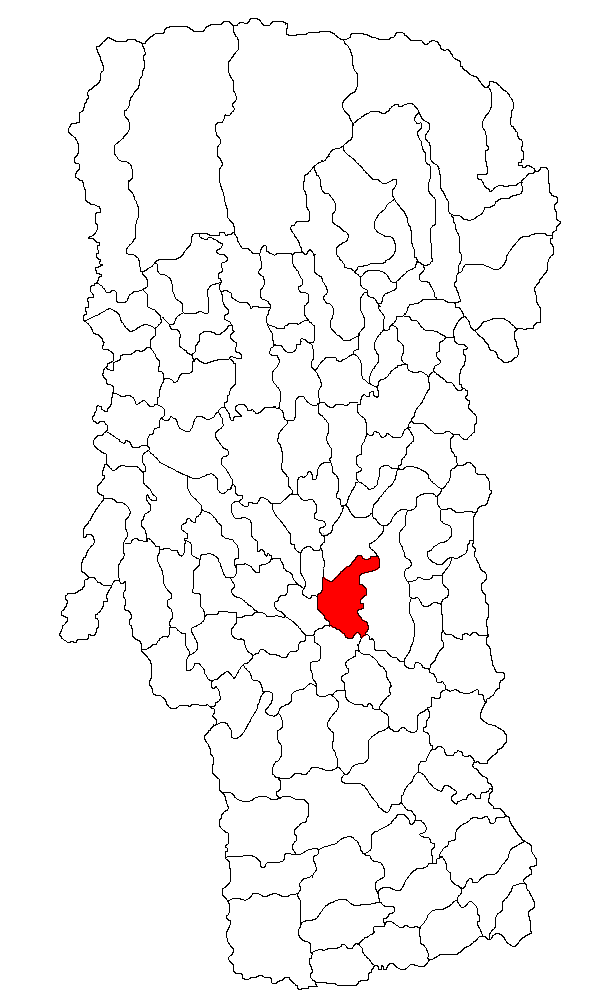
- Location in Argeș County

- Location in Romania
- Coordinates: 44°52′N 24°57′E
- Country: Romania
- County: Argeș

Government
  - Mayor (2024–2028): Nicolae Velcea (PSD)
- Area: 56.65 km^{2} (21.87 sq mi)
- Elevation: 300 m (980 ft)
- Population (2021-12-01): 15,931
  - Density: 281.2/km^{2} (728.4/sq mi)
- Time zone: UTC+02:00 (EET)
  - Summer (DST): UTC+03:00 (EEST)
- Postal code: 117715
- Area code: (+40) 02 48
- Vehicle reg.: AG
- Website: stefanesti-arges.ro

Ștefănești (Romanian pronunciation: [ʃtefəˈneʃtʲ]) is a town in Argeș County, Muntenia, Romania. The town administers seven villages: Enculești, Golești, Izvorani, Ștefăneștii Noi, Valea Mare-Podgoria, Viișoara, and Zăvoi. At the 2021 census, the town had a population of 15,931.

The town is located in the central part of Argeș County, just east of the county seat, Pitești. It lies on the banks of Râul Doamnei and its tributary, the Valea Mare. It is located in one of the best-known wine-producing regions of Muntenia.

Historical population
| Year | Pop. | ±% |
|---|---|---|
| 2002 | 12,983 | — |
| 2011 | 14,541 | +12.0% |
| 2021 | 15,931 | +9.6% |
Source: Census data

== Notable persons ==
- Dinu Brătianu (1866–1950), engineer and politician who led the National Liberal Party (PNL) from 1934 to 1947
- Ion I. C. Brătianu (1864–1927), politician, leader of the PNL, Prime Minister of Romania for five terms, and Foreign Minister on several occasions
- Vintilă Brătianu (1867–1930), politician who served as Prime Minister of Romania in 1927–28
- Dănuț Coman (born 1979), footballer
- Dinicu Golescu (1777–1830), Wallachian man of letters, mostly noted for his travel writings and journalism
- Leonard Manole (born 1993), footballer
- Ionuț Moșteanu (born 1973), politician
- Florentin Nicolae (born 1981), alpine skier
- George Olteanu (born 1974), boxer
