= Brătianu family =

Brătianu is a family of Romanian politicians, founders of the National Liberal Party (PNL). They are the following:

- Dincă Brătianu (1768–1844), Romanian nobleman
- Ion Brătianu (1821–1891), PNL president, 1875–1891; Interior Minister, 1867, 1867–1868, 1877–1878, 1878–1879, 1882, 1884–1887; President of the Assembly of Deputies, 1868–1869; Prime Minister, 1876–1888, with a brief interruption in 1881
- Dimitrie Brătianu (1818–1892), PLD president, 1885–1890; PNL president, 1891–1892; Foreign Affairs Minister, 1859; Interior Minister, 1860; Prime Minister and Foreign Affairs Minister, 1881; President of the Assembly of Deputies, 1881–1882
- Elisa Brătianu (née Princess Elisa Știrbei, daughter of Prince Alexandru B. Știrbei) (1870–1957) central figure in Romanian politics and cultural preservation from 1907 to 1948. Was a participant in the Inter-Allied Women's Conference presentation to the League of Nations in 1919.
- Ion I. C. Brătianu (1864–1927), PNL president, 1909–1927; Interior Minister, 1907–1909, 1910, 1923–1926; Foreign Affairs Minister, 1916–1918, 1918–1919, 1927; Prime Minister, 1908–1910, 1914–1918, 1918–1919, 1922–1926, 1927
- Dinu Brătianu (1866–1950), PNL president, 1934–1947; died at Sighet Prison
- Vintilă Brătianu (1867–1930), PNL president, 1927–1930; Prime Minister, 1927–1928
- Constantin C. (Bebe) Brătianu (1887–1956), PNL General Secretary, 1938–1947
- Gheorghe I. Brătianu (1898–1953), president of the National Liberal Party-Brătianu, 1930–1938; died at Sighet Prison
- Vintilică Brătianu (1914–1994), president of the Liberal Party 1993, 1993–1994
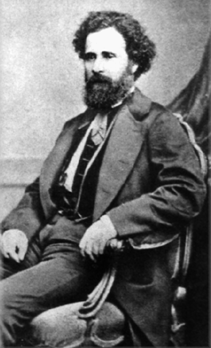
Ion Brătianu

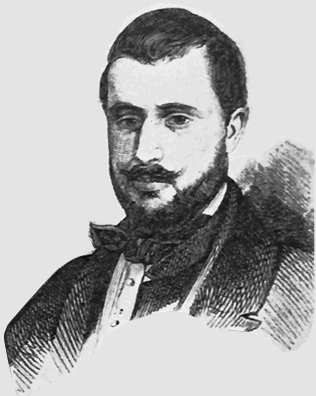
Dimitrie Brătianu

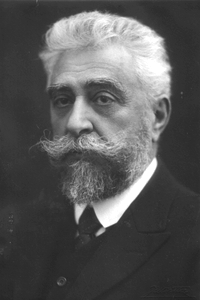
Ion I. C. Brătianu

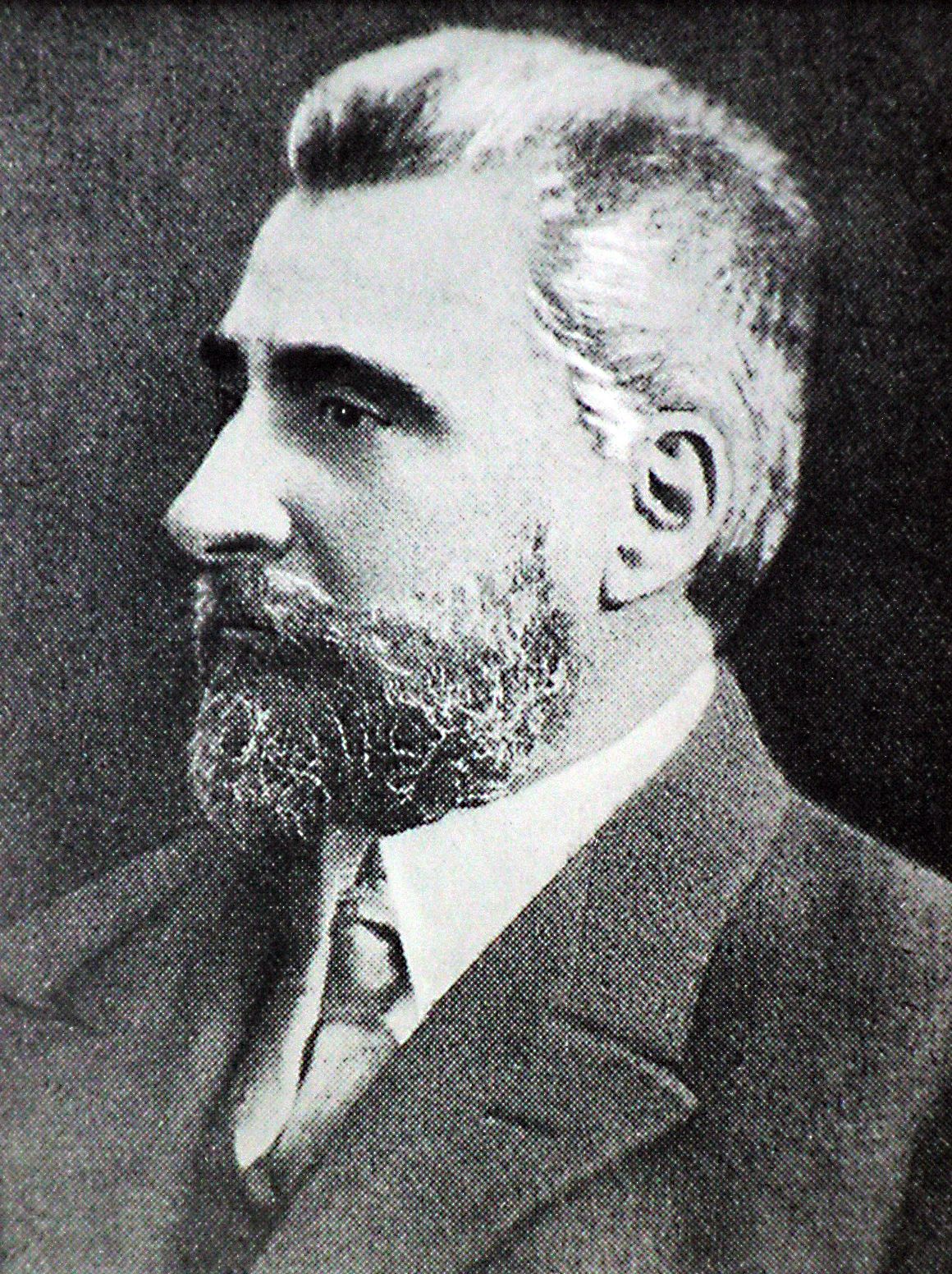
Vintilă Brătianu
