= Ion I. C. Brătianu =

Romanian politician (1864–1927)

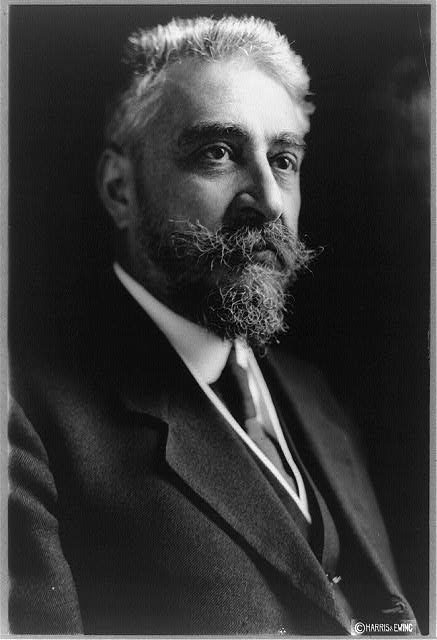

22nd Prime Minister of Romania
- In office 21 June 1927 – 24 November 1927
- Monarchs: Ferdinand I Michael I
- Preceded by: Barbu Știrbey
- Succeeded by: Vintilă Brătianu
- In office 19 January 1922 – 27 March 1926
- Monarch: Ferdinand I
- Preceded by: Take Ionescu
- Succeeded by: Alexandru Averescu
- In office 29 November 1918 – 27 September 1919
- Monarch: Ferdinand I
- Preceded by: Constantin Coandă
- Succeeded by: Artur Văitoianu
- In office 4 January 1914 – 26 January 1918
- Monarchs: Carol I Ferdinand I
- Preceded by: Titu Maiorescu
- Succeeded by: Alexandru Averescu
- In office 27 December 1908 – 28 December 1910
- Monarch: Carol I
- Preceded by: Dimitrie Sturdza
- Succeeded by: Petre P. Carp

Personal details
- Born: 20 August 1864 Ștefănești, Argeș County, United Principalities of Moldavia and Wallachia
- Died: 24 November 1927 (aged 63) Bucharest, Kingdom of Romania
- Resting place: Vila Florica, Ștefănești
- Party: National Liberal Party
- Spouses: Maria Moruzi-Cuza (m. 1897, 1897) Elisa Brătianu (m. 1907)
- Children: Gheorghe I. Brătianu
- Parents: Ion C. Brătianu; Pia Brătianu
- Relatives: Brătianu family
- Education: École nationale des ponts et chaussées
- Occupation: Politician; Engineer

Ion I. C. Brătianu (Romanian pronunciation: [iˈon brətiˈanu]; 1 September [O.S. 20 August] 1864 – 24 November 1927) was a Romanian politician, leader of the National Liberal Party (PNL), Prime Minister of Romania for five terms, and Foreign Minister on several occasions; he was the eldest son of statesman and PNL leader Ion Brătianu, the brother of Vintilă and Dinu Brătianu, and the father of Gheorghe I. Brătianu. Ion I. C. Brătianu's political activities after World War I, including part of his third and fourth term, saw the unification of the Old Romanian Kingdom with Transylvania, Bukovina and Bessarabia (see Greater Romania). In 1923, he was elected an honorary member of the Romanian Academy.

== Biography ==
=== Early life ===
Born at Florica, his father's estate in Ștefănești, Argeș County, he completed his secondary education at the Saint Sava National College in Bucharest (1882). He then volunteered for the Romanian Army's artillery, serving for six months before becoming a second lieutenant. During his military service, Brătianu studied engineering. He left for Paris in 1883, and attended the Collège Sainte-Barbe, then took classes (without being a registered student) at the École Nationale des Ponts et Chaussées (1884–1889). Brătianu received an engineer's diploma but not a licence to practice.

In 1889, he returned to the country and was assigned orders by the Army, being promoted to Lieutenant. Later in that year, he joined the Romanian Railways as an engineer, working under the leadership of Anghel Saligny.

=== Early politics ===
He became a member of the PNL in 1895, the same year he ran in elections and was elected to the Parliament of Romania by the Ist College (of the landed gentry) in Gorj County. In early 1899, he was in the majority that voted in favor of the entry of former members of the Romanian Social-Democratic Workers' Party into the PNL. He served as Minister of Public Works (31 March 1897-30 March 1899; 14 February 1901-18 July 1902) and Minister of the Interior (12 March 1907-27 December 1908) - the latter assignment was prompted by the effects of the 1907 Peasants' Revolt. In 1909, he was elected head of the National Liberals, a position he was to hold until his death; he became prime minister for the first time in January 1909, and staying in office until 28 December 1910.

Brătianu's policies moved the PNL towards an acceptance of land reform, but deliberations over the project continued until after World War I, with Brătianu himself showing reserves over projects that aimed to replace the 1866 Constitution of Romania with a fully democratic one. In 1913, he convinced his party to accept a moderate version of land reform, as well as the creation of a single electoral college, a measure that would have given more accurate representation to the peasant majority. Over the following months, these policies were approved on principle by King Carol I and even by the Conservative Party.

=== World War I ===
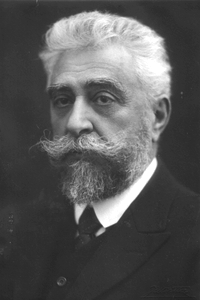
Ion I. C. Brătianu

The outbreak of the world conflict in 1914 brought a major polemic in Romanian society. The Conservatives oscillated between a neutral stance and participation alongside the Central Powers to which Romania had committed itself; instead, the PNL called for an alignment with the Entente Forces. Although Brătianu was again prime minister from 16 January 1914 to 9 February 1918, his policies in this respect were dilatory. Initially, a decision on the matter was blocked by King Carol until his death in September 1914. Afterwards, with the ascension of Ferdinand I, who was to remain a political ally of Brătianu for the rest of his life, the government started secret negotiations with the Entente that were meant to condition Romania's participation with the granting of Austro-Hungarian lands with a majority Romanian population. In August 1916, Romania declared war on Austria-Hungary.

Minor advances into Transylvania were met with a Central Powers counter-offensive that swept through Oltenia and Wallachia, occupied Bucharest, and forced the government to take refuge in Iași. While Moldavia remained the only region under Romanian administration and the country increased its reliance on Imperial Russia and then on the Russian Provisional Government, the Romanian Army blocked the Central Powers' further offensives in the battles of Mărășești, Mărăști, and Oituz. This situation was ended by the October Revolution in Russia and the Treaty of Brest-Litovsk between the Bolshevik government and the Central Powers: Romania saw itself without reinforcements, agreed to an armistice, and then signed the Treaty of Bucharest in May 1918.

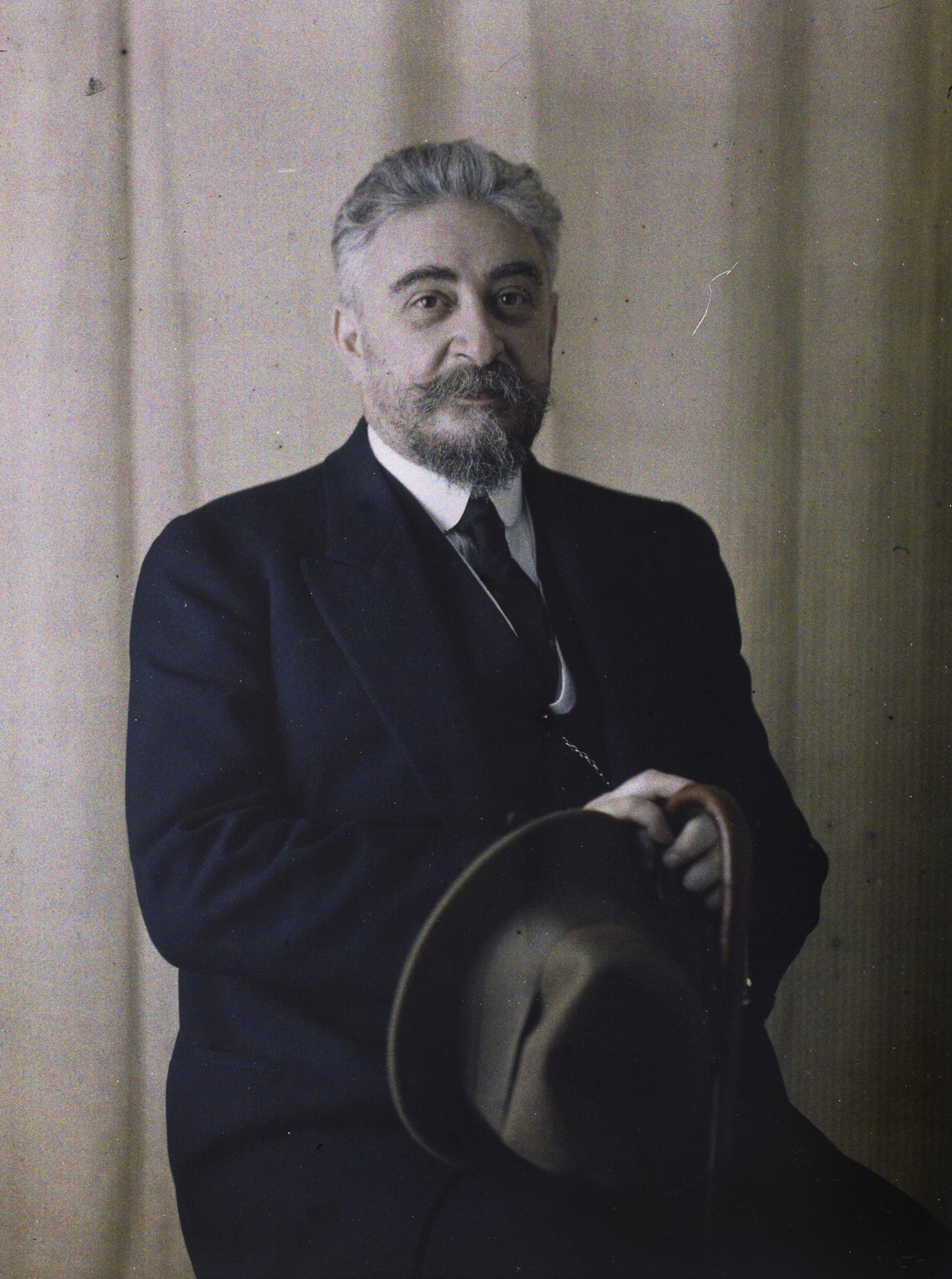
1919 Autochrome by Auguste Léon

In the meantime, Brătianu's government had been replaced with the crisis government of General Alexandru Averescu, and this was soon followed by Alexandru Marghiloman's (chosen to negotiate the peace, as the German Empire was thought to be friendly towards Marghiloman). Nonetheless, Romania never did ratify the signed treaty, and denounced it in October 1918, immediately re-entering the conflict on the Entente's side. In November, the Compiègne armistice with Germany removed all legal value of the Bucharest Treaty.

Brătianu was antisemitic and opposed the granting of Romanian citizenship to Jews. After World War I, however, antisemitism disappeared from the Liberals' political program, even forming alliances with Jewish politicians.

=== Third cabinet and support for Averescu ===
The spectre of socialist agitation, which had led to incidents such as a major strike action in Bucharest in December 1918, brought about the fall of the Constantin Coandă cabinet, and Brătianu again became prime minister. He led the Romanian delegation to the 1919 Paris Peace Conference, where he was a vocal supporter of the union with Transylvania and Bukovina. Although ultimately Romania received most territories it claimed, he resigned in 1919 since he would not accept a compromise on the disputed territories in Banat that had become part of the Kingdom of Yugoslavia. However, Romania had registered other successes - notably, Russia's exit from the war had led to the union with Bessarabia (the Moldavian Democratic Republic).

Soon, the PNL found itself threatened by the political realities of a Greater Romania. The policy of alliances of the Romanian National Party (a mainly Transylvanian group) had brought the rapid formation of the cabinet of Alexandru Vaida-Voevod in December 1919; this cabinet, and especially its Peasants' Party group, supported a radical version of the land reform, leading to endless debates in parliament. At the same time, the People's Party, a new and strong populist movement under General Averescu, had begun a campaign for both an urgent land reform and for bringing about the prosecution of PNL politicians as agents of the economic hardships. Faced with a choice, Brătianu approached Averescu and offered PNL support for a People's Party cabinet in return for moderation.

=== Fourth and fifth cabinet ===
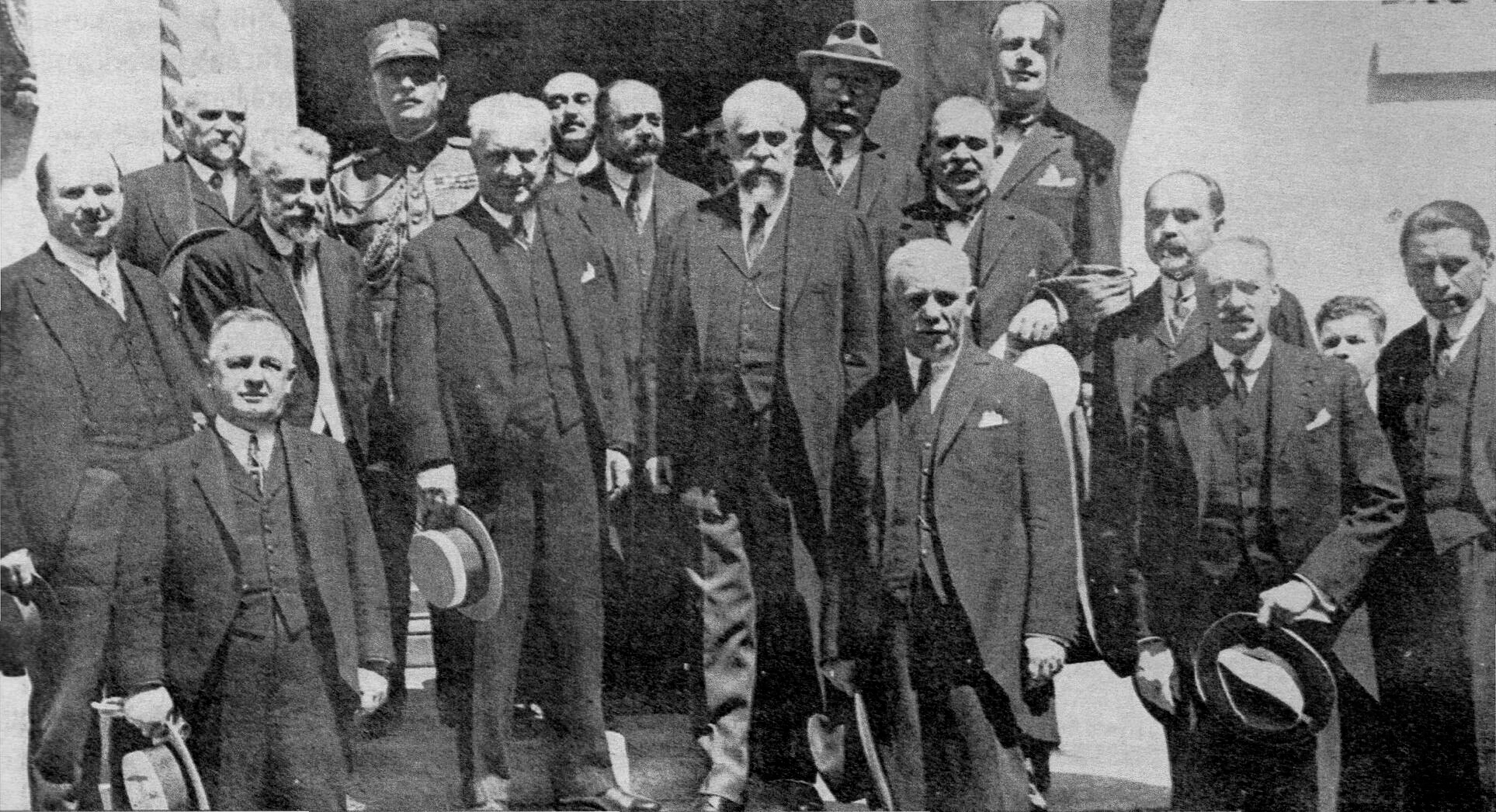
Brătianu's final cabinet upon being sworn in

The PNL withdrew its backing after finding a more convenient option in a Take Ionescu-led cabinet, and Brătianu became prime minister again from 17 January 1922 to 30 March 1926. The fourth Brătianu cabinet adopted the Constitution of 1923, a document which confirmed universal male suffrage and minority rights as first defined by the laws of 1918; because of the highly centralised model it favored, it drew suspicion from the Transylvanian politicians that it served the goal of a National Liberal-dominated Old Kingdom (especially after the constitution was approved of through a simple vote in Parliament). At the same time, the PNL cabinet began carrying out a national-level land reform.

As the elections of 1926 confirmed the rise of the National Peasants' Party (created as the union of the Romanian National and Peasants' parties), King Ferdinand again called on Averescu to form the government. By that time, the general was thought by the PNL to be a convenient agent of its own policies, but Averescu's negotiations for a return of the disinherited Prince Carol after his father's imminent death made Brătianu switch his support to a broad coalition government under Barbu Știrbey.

On 21 June 1927, Brătianu returned to office with his fifth and final cabinet. He died in Bucharest, from complications of laryngitis, and was replaced as prime minister by his brother Vintilă Brătianu until the calling of elections.
