= Gheza Vida =

Romanian sculptor

Gheza (Géza) Vida
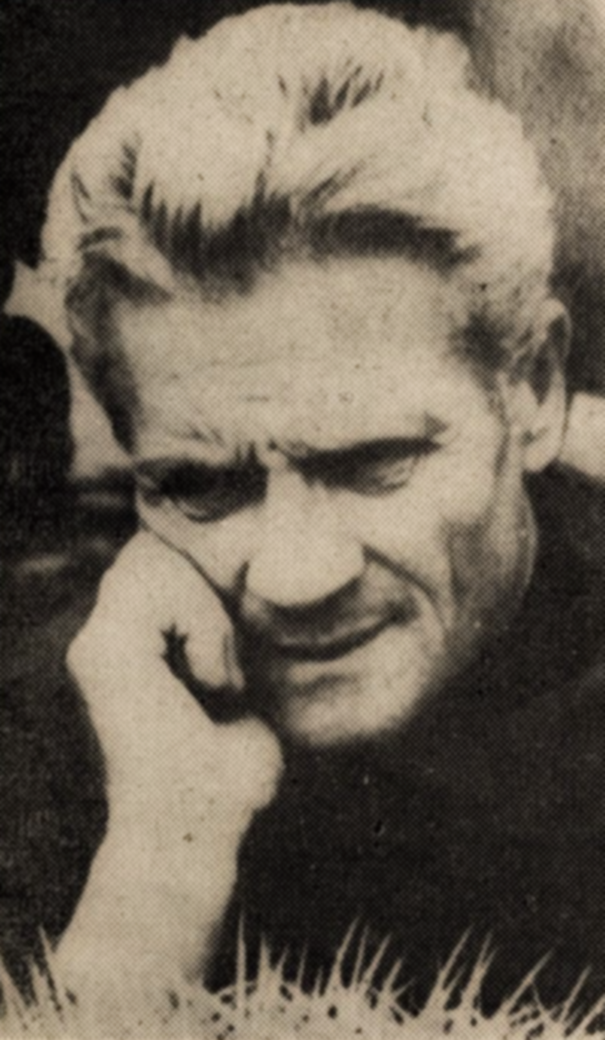
- Vida in May 1972
- Born: February 28, 1913; Nagybánya (Baia Mare), Austria-Hungary
- Died: May 11, 1980 (aged 67); Baia Mare, Socialist Republic of Romania
- Education: Hungarian School of Fine Arts
- Known for: Sculpture, woodcarving, engraving, drawing, stage design, political cartoon
- Movement: Primitivism, Expressionism, Socialist Realism
- Awards: State Prize (1953); Eminent Master of Art (1957); Order of Labor, 1st Class (1963); Artist of the People (1964); Order of Cultural Merit (1968); Grand Prize of the State Committee of Culture and the Arts (1971); Star of the Socialist Republic of Romania, 2nd Class (1978)
- Military Service
- Service: International Brigades; Romanian Land Forces
- Nickname: Grigore
- Conflicts: Spanish Civil War; Levante Offensive; Battle of the Ebro; World War II; Bratislava–Brno offensive

Gheza or Géza Vida, also known as Grigore (Hungarian: Vida Géza; February 28, 1913 – May 11, 1980), was a Romanian–Hungarian sculptor, engraver, industrial worker and communist militant, one of the most renowned artists of Maramureș region. The descendant of ethnic Romanian and Slovak miners, he was born in the Hungarian segment of Austria-Hungary. Raised by his mother after his father's death in World War I, he received financial support from local benefactors, who cultivated his artistic skill, particularly as a woodcarver. A citizen of Romania after the union of 1918, he was forced to drop out of school by economic circumstances, and worked for years in various industries and businesses, while also discovering his passion for beekeeping and gardening. He was drawn into far-left politics during the Great Depression, when he came to be influenced by radical artists such as Alexandru Ziffer, Aurel Popp, Vasile Kazar and Iosif Klein, who also introduced him to avant-garde experimentation. Vida was co-opted into the Union of Communist Youth and subsequently the Communist Party, producing propaganda art for both; this activity led to his temporary arrest in 1932 and 1933. A labor organizer, he helped establish the Artists' Trade Union and its branch in Baia Mare.

Having trained as a gunner in the Romanian Land Forces, Vida made repeated attempts at joining the International Brigades fighting in the Spanish Civil War. Though imprisoned and expelled upon illegally crossing the border with Czechoslovakia, he resumed the effort and finally reached Republican Spain in early 1938. He served for a few months under Nicolae Cristea and Valter Roman, before the Brigades were withdrawn from the Battle of the Ebro. Vida survived the retreat into France, surrendering to the National Gendarmerie. Vida moved between French internment camps, finally being sent to Gurs; he also continued to work as a propaganda artist, reaching an international audience. A participant in prisoner revolts before and after the fall of France, he was dispatched as a laborer to Nazi Germany, but eventually made his way to Northern Transylvania.

As a Romanian national in Regency Hungary, Vida was under continuous supervision. His studying at the Hungarian School of Fine Arts was interrupted by stints in a labor battalion, though he managed to escape during the Siege of Budapest. He rejoined the Romanian Army and, by the end of World War II, was stationed in Skalica. Returning to Baia Mare, in his thirties he emerged as a favorite artist of Romania's communist regime and became a deputy in the Great National Assembly, but voiced criticism of the regime's artistic standards. He repeatedly tried to resist the rise of Socialist Realism, and depicted Expressionism as a more authentically revolutionary current.

Vida's views were vindicated in the 1960s, when his synthesis of folk art and Expressionism was more fully assimilated by the communist establishment. He won both controversy and praise for his series of monumental pieces, including his Soldier's Memorial of Carei and his homage to the victims of the Moisei massacre. Made a full member of the Communist Party Central Committee in 1971, and a corresponding member of the Romanian Academy three years later, he was awarded numerous distinctions, including the Star of the Socialist Republic of Romania. In his last years, he drifted away from the Expressionist standard to absorb more influences from handicrafts and religious art.

== Biography ==
=== Origins and early life ===
In some Communist Party records, Vida was described as having "Magyar ethnicity". However, the artist's paternal ancestors were ethnic Romanians from the Austrian Empire: grandfather Simion Vida was a Greek Catholic from Iapa, working at the hammermill of Nagybánya (Baia Mare). His fifth child, Iosif, who worked his entire life as a miner, married a Rozalia Krupiczer of Cavnic. Her father was a Slovak colonist to the region. Gheza was born on February 28, 1913, at Nagybánya, as Baia Mare was then known. The city was at the time in Szatmár County, Kingdom of Hungary (itself part of Austria-Hungary). His exact birthplace was the family home, located very near to Valea Roșie Mine. The Hungarian-sounding name "Gheza" (or "Géza") was selected to honor a workmate of Iosif Vida's. Rozalia preferred to call him "Victor", since he turned out to be her only surviving child; the couple had had seven other children.

Despite being afflicted with lung problems, Iosif was drafted into World War I, and was heavily wounded on the Serbian Front; he died in his home in 1915. This forced Rozalia to seek employment as a housemaid in the home of Teofil Dragoș, a Romanian jurist and politician, where Gheza would spend his early infancy and early childhood. According to biographer Gheorghe I. Bodea, the future sculptor grew up as a socialist by witnessing the miners' strikes and protests during the Aster Revolution and the Soviet experiment; Dragoș's home was located outside Baia Mare prison, where most protesters were interned during the Hungarian–Romanian War. He was nevertheless friends with the prison warden, who took him and other children out on excursions. The warden also gave him detailed accounts of Romanian folklore, with both of them sharing a belief in Fata Pădurii as a creature who lures children into the forest.

Following the region's union with Romania, Vida was sent to the new Romanian school of Baia Sprie. Headmaster Alexandru Mouje, who was a passionate woodcarver, channeled the boy's creativity, encouraging him to create statuettes of animals (most of which are now lost). Gheza also enjoyed traveling into the Gutâi Mountains, which he much later described as a "fairy-tale land". Around 1920, he for a while with his grandparents in Dealul Crucii area. He took up rock collecting, and on one occasion was nearly killed after sliding into a mine shaft to pick up a more unusual stone. In 1923, he created his first complex works in wood, depicting peasants at their wedding and funeral ceremonies. He had by then become encouraged by the artistic boom of his native city: the Baia Mare School was experiencing its peak moment and, Vida recalled, "easels and working painters were on every street corner."

Dragoș was impressed by Vida's skills, and, wanting him to succeed in life, sponsored his full tuition at Gheorghe Șincai High School. However, Rozalia fell ill in 1928, when Gheza was in his terminal year; this prompted him to drop out of school and begin training as an apprentice gardener in Satu Mare. He returned to Baia Mare after only a few months, and began working as a beekeeper and gardener for a friend by the name of Lakatos. This venture ended abruptly when Lakatos, a member of the outlawed Romanian Communist Party (PCdR), was arrested, then jailed; Vida moved on to do contingent work at Phoenix Factory, before taking and a job as a lumberjack, then a minor position for the Romanian Railways. He reportedly worked briefly as a nightwatchman and as a gold miner in Baia Sprie. According to a later record by his friend Mihai Florescu, throughout the 1930s Vida was still primarily a beekeeper.

=== Communist beginnings ===
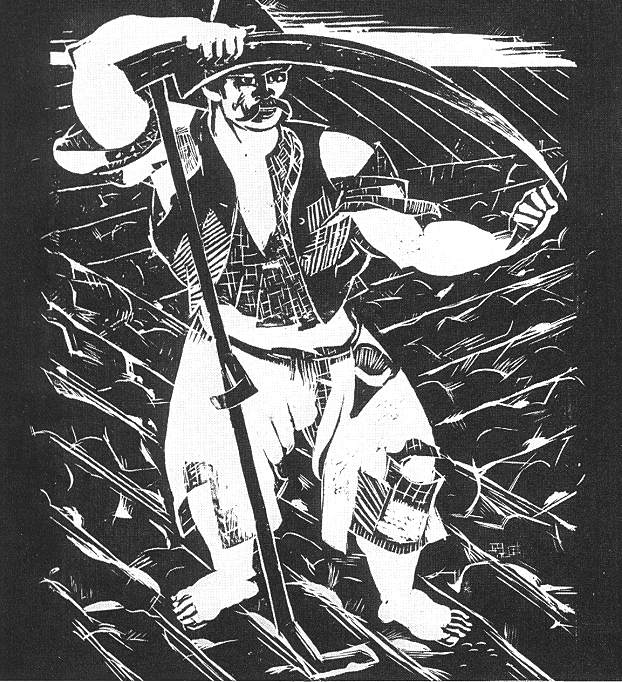
"Peasant Whetting the Scythe", 1928 woodcut by Gyula Derkovits, who inspired Vida's early sculptures

While he could no longer pursue training in art, Vida still drew, sculpted and carved, also taking advice from vacationing artists such as Petre Abrudan, Alexandru Ciucurencu and Jenő Szervánszky. He befriended the local artist Géza Kádár and his piano-teaching wife Elisabeta. Both fostered his artistic education, and put him into contact with artist Béni Ferenczy. He appears to have been heavily influenced by Gyula Derkovits, transposing into reliefs what Derkovits had achieved with engravings. Vida's new sculptures included the first of his "peasant-and-scythe" pieces, which alluded to his artistic incorporation of social protest. Abrudan also made Vida a member of his Greco-Roman wrestling team, which doubled as a PCdR recruitment cell; Vida's contribution there also included an engraving of wrestlers, reused by Abrudan as the core design for his club's advertising posters.

As Romania's mining industry was heavily hit in the Great Depression, in 1929–1932 Baia Mare became the center of a growing protest movement and an electoral pool for the PCdR's Peasant Workers' Bloc. While not yet a PCdR member, Vida recalled being a full participant in the strike movement at Phoenix. A fellow artist, Iosif Klein, took him into his communist art club and began influencing him politically; Vida turned to more explicitly revolutionary themes, including his first-ever portraits of peasant rebels such as Horea and Pintea. Through Klein's influence, his work accommodated echoes from the European avant-garde, as well as from African sculpture; this blend appeared in his primitivist carvings of "monkey-men".

In 1932, Vida joined the Union of Communist Youth (UTC), being directly supervised by the more senior communist Ileana Wolf. That year, he produced UTC propaganda art, alongside Ioan Décsey. He was arrested in a Siguranța roundup and held in custody for a week, during which he was reportedly beaten; he never agreed to cooperate with the authorities, and, upon release, remained under surveillance. Klein having moved to Bucharest, Alexandru Ziffer took charge of the communist artists in Baia Mare, whose contribution included correcting Vida's drawings and offering him more artistic input. Vida himself referred to this new art movement as "giving form to the aspirations of the people, to its fight for freedom", singling out Vasile Kazar as its leading exponent. Still engaged in political agitation, he was tasked with unionizing the charcoal burners of Ulmoasa. As he recalled, the experience put him into contact with extreme poverty, and also opened him up to their folklore, which was the peasants' sole entertainment.

Following the Grivița strike and a countrywide clampdown in February 1933, Vida was again in Siguranța custody, under a preemptive lock-down. He and his colleagues were released in short while for lack of evidence. Occasional arrests still occurred in 1933. In early 1934, Vida attended the clandestine UTC meeting in Cluj, where he presented a report on the issue. His engravings were being used in protest art for the PCdR, with proceedings going to the International Red Aid. In November, he received what is probably the first of his artistic reviews. Published in Bányai Lapok, it praised Vida as a "man of the future" and enemy of all things kitsch, noting the interest that art collectors were taking in his sculptures. In 1935, Ziffer obtained that Vida be formally admitted into the Baia Mare art colony.

=== Spanish Civil War ===
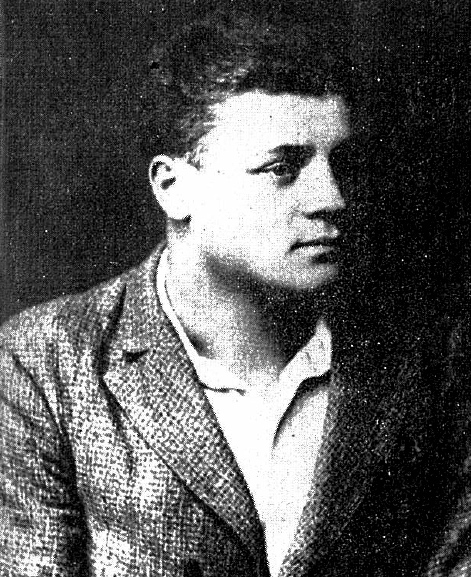
Vida in 1936, shortly before he left to fight in the Spanish Civil War

In 1935–1936, Vida was drafted into the Romanian Land Forces, serving with the 32nd Artillery Regiment in Satu Mare, where he continued to sculpt. He was still performing his duties when news of the Spanish Civil War reached him. Reading up on articles by Scarlat Callimachi, Ion Călugăru, Zaharia Stancu or Alecu Constantinescu, Vida became passionate about defending the Second Spanish Republic. The thought of volunteering for the International Brigades came to him while in Satu Mare, and he contacted his PCdR liaison, Francisc Wolf-Boczor, to ask for approval. Upon returning home, he graduated into the PCdR, and quickly became one of its regional leaders. He had resumed ownership of his father's home, which occasionally hosted illegal party conferences. In tandem, he worked with Aurel Popp and János Thorma to organize a regional artists' congress, with representatives from Maramureș, the Banat, and Transylvania at large. Convened on June 14, 1936, it became the nucleus of a Fine Artists' Trade Union, which had Popp and Ziffer among its leaders. Exactly a year later, after repeated efforts to reconcile the factions of Baia Mare School into a single branch of the Trade Union, Vida gave up and established a chapter comprising mostly his left-wing colleagues; its leader was Thorma, but Vida was ensured a place on the steering committee. The group's first show in August 1937 was interrupted by the Romanian Police, which confiscated three of Vida's reliefs over worries that they spread communist ideology. Despite this, the show garnered positive reviews from local critics, with several more being held into October 1937.

Eventually, in October 1937, Vida set out on his clandestine journey to Spain: telling his mother that he was merely taking a trip to Izvoarele, he backpacked along Boczor and another activist into Czechoslovakia, rallying with other volunteers at Veľká Sevljuš. However, this illegal crossing made them targets for repression by Czechoslovak Gendarmes. According to Vida's recollection, these were members of the White émigré community who beat the volunteers up as reprisals for their communist beliefs. Vida and his comrades were then sentenced to one month in prison, despite the efforts of the Communist deputy for Subcarpathian Rus to grant them asylum as political refugees.

The prisoners were finally released and expelled to Romania on December 1, 1937. The group, which also included Ion Călin, immediately returned by the same route, escaping rearrest and reaching Košice, then Prague. Vida made his way into Austria on his second attempt, walked over a frozen marshland into Switzerland, and then crossed into France. He spend a short period in Paris, where he received support from an activist working for the Romanian pavilion at the Paris Exposition, moved south to Béziers, and finally avoided checks by the border police to reach Spain in late January 1938. In the International Brigades, Vida was most often known as "Grigore"—his nom de guerre and, increasingly over time, his artistic pseudonym. He was initially stationed for instruction at Casas-Ibáñez, and then assigned along five other Romanians to the "Rosa Luxemburg" Artillery Regiment. However, he requested and obtained a transfer to the Romanian Artillery Regiment, being assigned to the newly-created "Tudor Vladimirescu" Battery, under Nicolae Cristea and Valter Roman. Regimental colleagues included artist Zdeněk Přibyl.

A card-carrying member of the Communist Party of Spain in 1938–1941, Vida was stationed outside Tarragona, seeing action during the defense of Levante and the Battle of the Ebro. As recalled by his peers, he was still intensely artistic, using his free time to carve up peasant figures and "monster heads". In his memoirs of the conflict, Valter Roman notes that Vida enjoyed "great sympathy from his comrades in arms", his art evoking memories of home. Vida also published political cartoons and front-line drawings in the Battery's newspaper. Outside of battles, he attended political sessions, maintained a small regimental library, and recalled being in the attendance for visits by Dolores Ibárruri and Paul Robeson. Vida also recalled having met cellist Pablo Casals.

=== Internment ===
In September 1938, the League of Nations obtained that Republican Spain withdraw the Romanian troops away from the fighting. Vida last fought in Spain in January 1939, during the Catalonia Offensive, when Francoists drove the International Brigades northward, toward the French border. He helped with logistics during the hasty retreat, notably by rebuilding a wooden bridge across one of the regional rivers. On February 9, he crossed the Pyrenees and surrendered to the National Gendarmerie; the following day, he was interned in the improvised camp of Saint-Cyprien. In summer 1939, he was dispatched to a more permanent, larger compound, the camp of Gurs.

As "Grigore", Vida illustrated the prisoners' political magazine with images of the home country, and produced linocuts of his internment; these were paid by other inmates with extra rations of food. Some of his drawings were smuggled out of Saint-Cyprien inside a prosthetic leg. The Quaker Peace Council republished these in England, sending Vida a lump payment of 500 pound sterling. With Přibyl and Blasco Mentor, he established the art school of Gurs, which lasted to summer 1940, and organized festivities marking the 150th anniversary of the French Revolution.

When World War II broke out in September 1939, Vida and his fellow prisoners were in open conflict with the French authorities, and this prolonged itself during the Battle of France. On Labor Day 1940, the prisoners went on strike and faced a series of punishments. The entire camp population asked to join the French Foreign Legion, and, when ignored, staged another protest, which broke up when camp guards fired into the crowd; however, resistance continued inside the barracks, where Vida and his colleagues scrummed together, preventing their adversaries from capturing any single person.

Following the fall of France in June 1940, Vida's former colleagues of Gurs destroyed most of his surviving works, preventing their seizure by Nazi occupiers; though an attempt was made to smuggle some of his sculptures to Paris, they were lost in the confusion. Taking temporary charge of Gurs, Vichy France broke up prisoners' solidarity and dispatched various groups to other camps; Vida ended up at Argelès-sur-Mer, in Vichy's territory. Events in Romania also resulted in his change of national status: Baia Mare had been included in Northern Transylvania, taken over by the Hungarian Kingdom following the Second Vienna Award. According to Bodea, Vida was shocked by this development, since, he believed, it meant surrendering to fascism.

Vida's time at Argelès was ended abruptly in March 1941, when Vichy decided to liquidate the camp and deport its population. A prisoners' rebellion was broken up by the Gendarmes, but eventually only part of the prisoners were taken to the colonies; Vida found himself labeled a prisoner of war and then transported as a forced laborer in Gau Württemberg-Hohenzollern. He finally became a farmhand in the Black Forest, outside Stuttgart. His employer Karl Rimm allowed him to carve a gateway in Maramureș style. Throughout the interval, Vida planned to make his way back home. With assistance from some affiliates of Germany's Communist Party, he obtained a work permit which allowed him to travel, and finally reached Baia Mare in November 1941.

=== In Budapest and Skalica ===
Still holding a Romanian passport, Vida was required to present himself for controls by the Hungarian Royal Gendarmerie. In summer 1942, deciding to evade police scrutiny, he made a clandestine trip to Budapest. Here, he resumed his friendship with Béni Ferenczy, who was an agent of the Hungarian Communist Party; writer Pál Aranyosi also put him into contact with the communist underground, which co-opted him for a scheme to blow up a bridge at Szolnok. When trying to register for classes at the School of Fine Arts, Vida was listed among the category of "foreign refugees". The police of his native city allowed him to transfer, and finally Vida matriculated, studying under Jenő Bori. This interval gave him a better understanding of classical canons, and especially of archaic Greek sculpture, which became one of his subject matters. Financially supported by his colleagues in Maramureș, he produced works which took liberties with carving styles, and took a research trip to Székely Land, where he took in new elements of crafting. He became romantically involved with Géza Kádár's daughter Ecaterina, who was attending the Franz Liszt Academy of Music.

In late 1942, Vida was forced to join the Romanian Labor Company at Szinérváralja (Seini); his imprisonment was postponed before January 1943, when he was allowed to resume his studies. In March, he was given permission to exhibit new works at Kolozsvár (Cluj). Vida was again forcefully conscripted in summer 1943, and again dispatched to Szinérváralja—one of some 15,000 Romanians to be held in custody under this forced-labor regime. Again freed before the end of the year, he resumed his activity with the Baia Mare Trade Union, helping to organize its exhibit in January 1944. He married Ecaterina and intended to settle down, but in May was again sent to do forced labor, this time for the brewery in Kőbánya. At home, his work continued to be exhibited, and was the centerpiece of a Kolozsvár exhibit in August 1944. By then, however, the Nazi intervention in Hungary had endangered the Vida family and Gheza's artworks. The Arrow Cross Party endorsed the roundup and mass extermination of Hungarian Jews. This also meant that Jewish art collectors were stripped of their belongings, allowing Vida's sculptures to fall into government hands.

Vida was in Kőbánya when King Michael's Coup took Romania into the Allied camp. Hiding during the Siege of Budapest, he surrendered to the Red Army and his fellow Romanians on January 1, 1945. Traveling by foot to Nagykáta, then to Arad, he enlisted as a volunteer in the Romanian Land Forces. He returned to action during the Bratislava–Brno Offensive, making his way to Skalica; it was here that he caught news of the German Instrument of Surrender, returning to Arad in May 1945. Upon his arrival there, he began sketching various sculptural ensembles, usually showing peasants in revolt or dancing the hora. They showed influences from Pieter Bruegel the Elder, and were generally primitivist. Signing up to a Popp's manifesto, which reestablished the Baia Mare Trade Union as an explicitly socialist and democratic club, Vida was still in uniform and stationed at the garrison in Cluj to August 1945. Over those months, the communist organ Scînteia celebrated his return to Romania, calling him a "revolutionary artist" who had "ceaselessly fought against fascism". Vida rejoined the PCdR that same year, before returning to Baia Mare. Co-opted by Lidia Agricola, he began lecturing at the local Free School, which was a reincarnation of the interwar art colony.

=== Expressionism vs. Socialist Realism ===
The subsequent interval was one of expansion for the Communist Party, now styled "Romanian Workers' Party", or PMR. In early 1948, it set up the Romanian People's Republic. During this process, Scînteia published articles more critical of Vida's artistic vision, claiming that he had lapsed into "formalism". The sculptor's son Gheorghe notes that these attacks referred to Vida Sr's lack of interest in Socialist Realism and Soviet art, since he felt bothered by their "photographic rendition of reality and new-man optimism." However, in 1948–1948 Vida was president of the "Verification Commission" in Satu Mare, tasked with assessing the loyalties of recent PMR inductees. October 1948 marked Gheza's participation in the state-sponsored Transylvanian Art Exhibit, and more praise published by various critics. He was commissioned to work on the Liberation Obelisk of Baia Mare, which also included a series of reliefs. In December 1948, Vida was also hosted by the Bucharest Republican Palace, receiving a prize from the Ministry of Arts in January 1949. This was followed in 1953 by Romania's State Prize.

From 1950 to 1954, while his work went on its first international tours, Vida was a professor at the Baia Mare High School of Arts, established following the incorporation of Agricola's Free School as a state-run institution. It was at this stage that critic N. Argintescu-Amza identified Vida as an Expressionist à la Ernst Barlach. Gheorghe Vida referred to his father's overall contribution as a synthesis of Greek sculpture, peasant woodcarving, and "Northern Expressionism". As argued by Vida Jr, Expressionism was mostly spontaneous in Gheza's work, appearing in the 1940s and resembling Barlach's only by coincidence: the Romanian artist first encountered Barlach's pieces in the late 1950s, while visiting East Germany. Vida Sr accepted the label in a 1972 interview, when he highlighted the "revolutionary role" of Expressionist art: "I myself was an Expressionist, perhaps I still am one." In his 1951 letters to Popp, he had spoken out against subsuming artists to a singular style, noting that revolutionary art also needed to display an artist's individuality and originality.

However, in 1952–1958 Vida risked upsetting communist censors, and had to embrace Socialist Realism—though he continued to make discreet references to his earlier avant-garde works. He generally abandoned his work in wood and came to use mostly stone and plaster; this period saw him designing the Miner's Monument in Baia Mare, described by his son as impersonal. Reinterpreting the core themes of his art, he reemerged in 1954 with a relief depicting Pintea. This was widely praised by the official press: in Scînteia, engraver Ligia Macovei noted that it was superior to most other works presented at the time, "suffused with ideas" and displaying "authentic figures". Acknowledged as an official artist, Vida was able to obtain that Popp, who had been ignored and censored by the regime, be admitted into the Romanian Artists' Syndicate (UAP) in 1955.

Vida's Greek Catholic community had been absorbed by the Romanian Orthodox Church, but continued to organize in secret. As reported by art critic Radu Bogdan, the sculptor was in touch with this community; in 1956, he informed Bogdan that clandestine Greek Catholics had created the Merry Cemetery of Săpânța, thus allowing for that monument to be discovered by the outside world. In 1957, the communist government recognized Vida as an Eminent Master of Art. Co-opted by the People's Democratic Front (formed around the PMR), Vida took a seat in the Great National Assembly after the election of that February; he represented Ocna Șugatag. Alongside Kazar, Vida organized a retrospective of his work in 1958, earning much praise from critics Petru Comarnescu, Dan Hăulică and Eugen Schileru; also in 1957, he presented sculptures at the Venice Biennale Romanian pavilion and the Socialist Art Exhibit in Moscow. He toured Italy to get a direct experience of Renaissance art, being especially impressed with Lorenzo Ghiberti's work on the Florence Baptistery. Rebelling against Socialist Realism, in 1961 he produced "Toward the Mine Chute". As noted by Gheorghe Vida, its "simplicity and severity" were meant to clash with the official rhetoric and with visions of miners as "culture heroes". With this work, Vida Jr writes, his father was entering an "archetypal phase".

=== Carei and Moisei ===
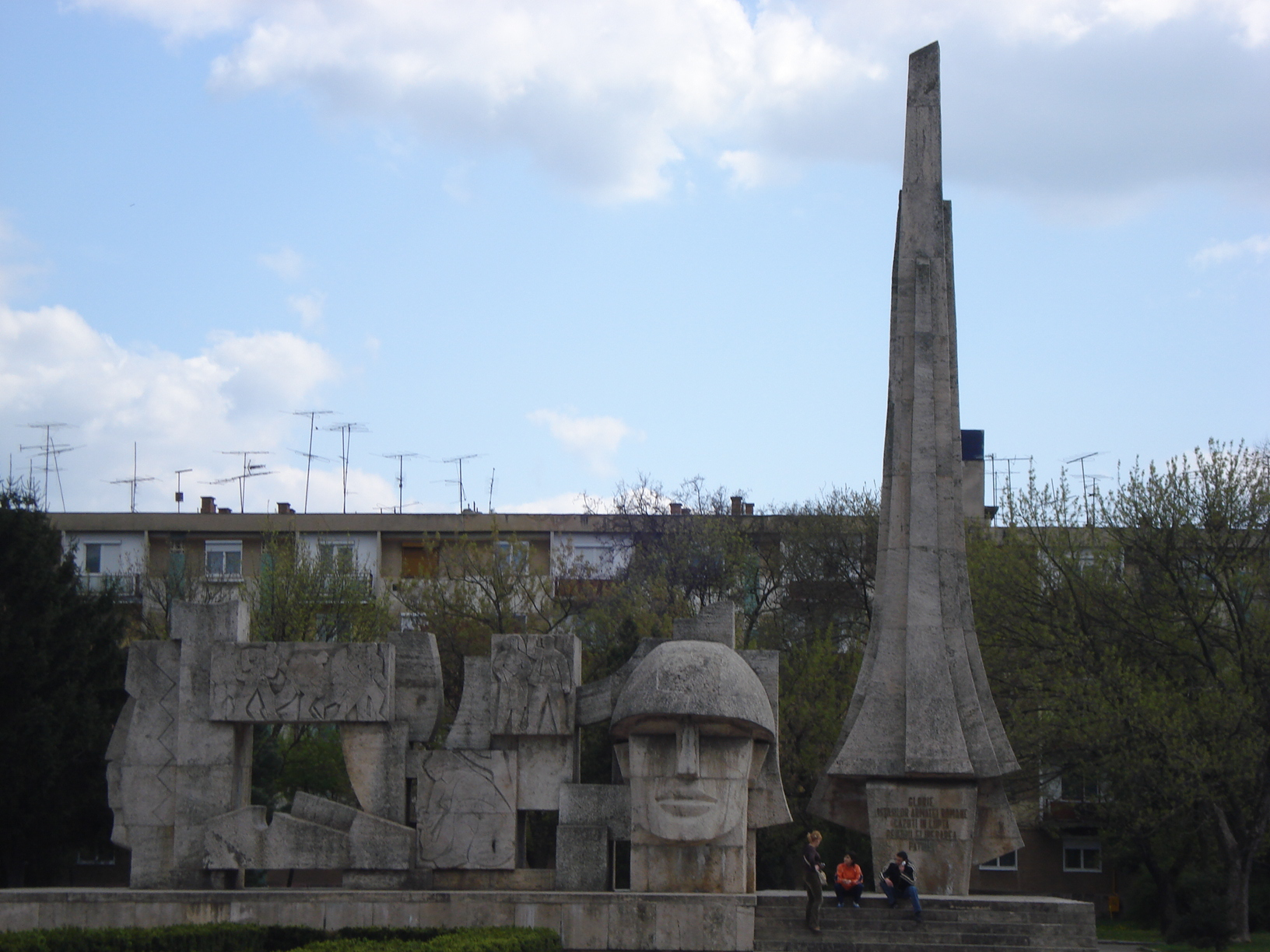
Monument of the Romanian Soldier in Carei

By then, the regime itself was discarding Socialist Realism (see De-Stalinization in Romania). Exhibits of Vida's art were frequent over the following years, and included a special showing of his Saint-Cyprien and Gurs linocuts at the Republican Palace, marking the PMR's 50th anniversary in 1961. He presented himself in the Assembly election, winning a new term as a representative of Dragomirești. When he himself turned 50 in 1963, there was a national celebration in his honor, with Contemporanul deeming him Romania's "most original artist". Government indicted him into its Order of Labor, 1st Class, and arranged for his work to also be displayed in Warsaw; in 1964, it also bestowed upon him its highest professional recognition, deeming him an Artist of the People.

Vida himself co-opted Ciucurencu for a less formal exhibit in Prague, in the Czechoslovak Socialist Republic, which was a retrospective for showing of both artists' contributions. Rudé Právo and other Czechoslovak newspapers gave ample coverage to this show, "underscoring the successes of cultural revolution in the People's Republic of Romania." Vida was also commissioned for a monumental work, the Romanian Soldier's Memorial in Carei, blending into it the various influences of folk art. That monument was in deep contrast with military tradition, prompting criticism from Army representatives. Vida only agreed to some minor concessions, which included a set of reliefs done in a more conventional, "descriptive", format. Made of white stone, the monument is 18 m wide, 5 m deep, and 12 m high; situated on the site of the Battle of Carei, it commemorates the soldiers fallen in the struggles for the liberation of the homeland.

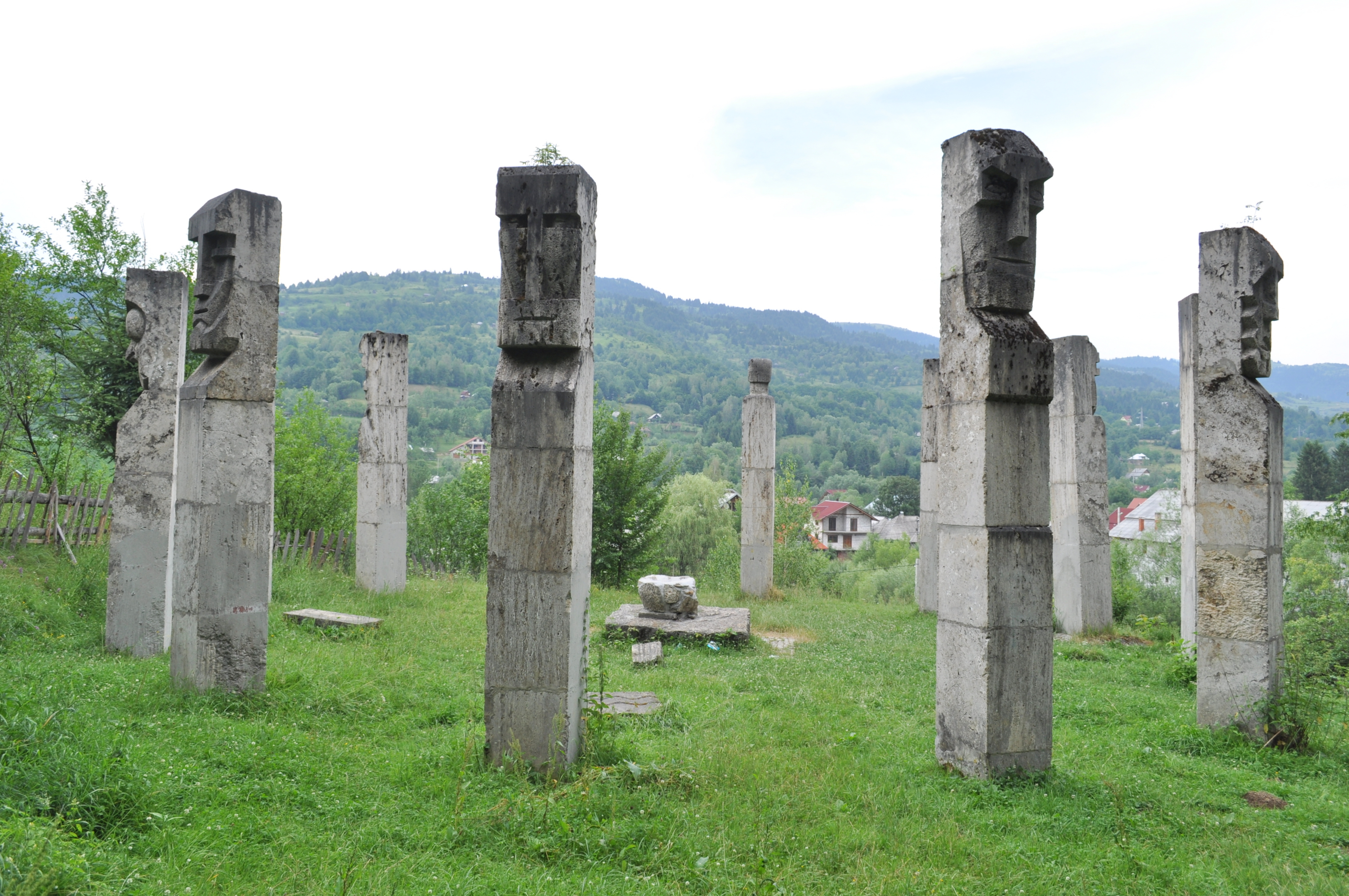
Monument to the victims of the Moisei massacre

In tandem, Vida served on the PMR executive board for Maramureș Region, and, also in 1963, headed the Regional Arts and Culture Committee. Following a new election in March 1965, he took the Assembly seat for Rozavlea. That year, Vida expanded on his large-scale works with a monument to the 30 Romanians killed in the Moisei massacre of 1944. It was initially a composition bringing together twelve sessile oaks handpicked by Vida and carved by him to resemble "characters from the Maramureș folk stories"; from 1972, he replaced them with more durable stone reproductions. According to travel notes by writer Geo Bogza, it was perfectly comparable to Constantin Brâncuși's more famous monumental complex in Târgu Jiu, tough also inspired by the Dacian sanctuary of Sarmizegetusa Regia. Critic Constantin Prut referred to Vida's work as his "act of patriotism", "the most expressive and most stirring sculptural ensemble in these last decades of Romanian art."

With Nicolae Ceaușescu as its General Secretary, the PMR renamed itself Romanian Communist Party (PCR). On July 24, 1965, Vida was inducted by the PCR's Central Committee, but only as a junior member. He had by then graduated from the University of Marxism-Leninism in its night school version, and was serving on the new Politburo of Maramureș County. In 1966, Ceaușescu also received Vida into the Order of Tudor Vladimirescu, 3rd Class. From 1968, with articles and interviews in Scînteia, Vida described his debt to the "purely authentic" folk art of Maramureș, urging its preservation and promotion. He designed a monument commemorating the Revolt of Horea, Cloșca and Crișan; complete in 1972, it was meant to be permanently displayed somewhere in the Apuseni Mountains. In 1968, he was working on a monumental portrait of Gelou, to be erected near Gherla. Also that year, Vida was elected UAP Vice President (reelected in 1973), receiving the Order of Cultural Merit.

=== Final period ===
On August 12, 1969, Vida was promoted to full member of the PCR Central Committee; in 1971, he became a Hero of Socialist Labor. As argued by political scientist Vladimir Tismăneanu, such promotions signaled to the world that Ceaușescu was restoring links with the PCdR old guard—including veterans of Spain such as Vida, Roman, and Petre Borilă. Though he pondered moving to a villa in Cotroceni (downtown Bucharest), Vida confessed in 1973 that he could not see himself removed from "my native land" in Maramureș. He was focused on creating a new series of sculptures inspired by fairy tales, with depictions of Mother Varvara, the Solomonari, and the Pricolici. As noted in 1973 by physician and art connoisseur Octavian Fodor, "Maramureș is currently identified with Gheza Vida."

Vida's ensemble "Council of Elders" was awarded a grand prize by the State Committee of Culture and the Arts in 1971, and was permanently displayed in downtown Baia Mare from 1974. The work was reportedly inspired by a real-life parlay among the old men of Bârsana. In parallel, Vida had begun working on woodcarvings directly inspired by Maramureș handicrafts, including objets such as spoons, bowls and flying shuttles. Exhibited in Baia Mare in 1975, these "enjoyed great success". Vida wrote a one-page introduction to Maramureș folk art, which appeared in a 1971 issue of Tribuna; he also contributed the preface to Francisc Munteanu's monograph on the Maramureș masks, put out in 1973 by the Baia Mare Advisory Center for Handicrafts. That year, on his 60th anniversary, Vida held several personal exhibits, including one at Sala Dalles—shared with his friend Kazar. Art critic Ion Frunzetti covered the latter event, writing that "in today Romania's cultural metabolism, Gheza Vida is an element as necessary as air and water."

In 1973, Vida, Ciucurencu and Corneliu Baba sent some of their works to be permanently displayed by the Museum of Solidarity in Socialist Chile; these arrived in the country shortly after the right-wing military coup, and are presumed lost. Vida was additionally recognized in 1974, when he became a corresponding member of the Romanian Academy while his works were being exhibited in Benelux and Scandinavia. Not having registered as a candidate in the March 1969 election, he ran on the Front of Socialist Unity list during the race of 1975, taking a seat reserved for Vișeu de Sus. In 1976, he participated in an homage to Brâncuși, while his own contributions were the subject of a documentary film by Sorin Ilieșiu. The following year, he sent works to be exhibited at a show marking 70 years since the Romanian Peasant Revolt; he also made his debut as a stage designer with a Botoșani production of Andrei Mureșanu, based on a text by Mihai Eminescu. He became a recipient of the Star of the Socialist Republic of Romania, 2nd Class, in 1978, when he also saw his works featured at the Romanian modern art show in West Berlin.

In his final years, Vida moved even closer to the staples of Greek sculpture, producing less Expressionistic works—including a "Flute Girl" in 1976. A 1978 depiction of Christ was heavily inspired by a wayside cross in Berbești, with only the most minimal carvings to a contorted pear-trunk; this "archetypal" period also produced totem poles which decorated Vida's house or were gifts to his friends. His final contributions include a stone version of the "Council of Elders", done in 1980. Still a member of the PCR Central Committee, Vida was head of the Great National Assembly's Committee on Education, Science and Culture from April 1, 1980. He became passionate about cacti, and had shared his cultivars with the miners of Herja (outside Baia Mare). Suffering from chronic heart disease during his final years, the artist died in Baia Mare on May 11, 1980. According to Valter Roman, Vida was planning at the time two large-scale works: a marble representation of Beethoven's Symphony No. 9 as a monument to human solidarity and brotherhood, and a monument to the International Brigades.

== Legacy ==
Vida was survived by his son, the art critic Gheorghe Vida, and by daughter Zoe Vida Porumb, wife of art historian Marius Porumb. His will donated his large plant collection, comprising some 4,000 cacti, to the County Museum of Baia Mare. Much affected by a cold wave in 1987, the artifacts were reportedly left in poor condition before 2006. After having undergone restoration, enlisting Baia Mare City Hall's help, they were exhibited in a special compound of the Central Park in May 2018. That month, a Gheza Vida bust, created by Ioan Marchiș, was unveiled downtown; the ceremony was also attended by Romanian Orthodox Church officials who recited his parastas.
