= Romulus Zăroni =

Romanian politician and agronomist (1906–1962)

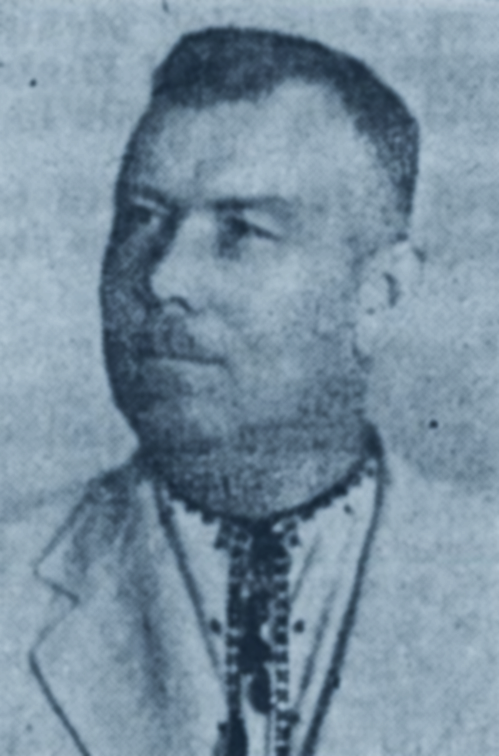
- Zăroni in 1948

Minister of Co-operation of Romania
- In office 30 November 1946 – 13 April 1948

Romanian Minister of Agriculture and Royal Domains
- In office 6 March 1945 – 30 November 1946
- Preceded by: Ioan Hudiță
- Succeeded by: Traian Săvulescu

Member of the Great National Assembly
- In office 30 December 1947 – 23 October 1962
- Constituency: Târnava-Mică County (to 1952); Ilia (1952–1962)

Member of the Assembly of Deputies
- In office November 1946 – 30 December 1947
- Constituency: Târnava-Mică County

Personal details
- Born: 28 April 1906 Hășdat (Hosdát) or Nădăștia de Sus (Felsőnádasd), Hunyad County, Kingdom of Hungary, Austria-Hungary
- Died: October 23, 1962 (aged 56)
- Party: Agrarian League (1932); Ploughmen's Front (1933–1938; 1944–1953); Romanian Workers' Party (1955–1962)
- Other political affiliations: BPD/FDP (1946–1962)
- Spouse(s): Tița (div.); Ștefania
- Children: 4
- Profession: Smallholder, agronomist, entrepreneur, propagandist, poet
- Nickname: Zăronea

Romulus Zăroni or Zeroni (Hungarian: Zaroni Romulusz; 28 April 1906 – 23 October 1962) was an Austro-Hungarian-born Romanian politician and agronomist, who collaborated with Petru Groza in establishing the left-agrarian Ploughmen's Front, and served as Minister of Agriculture in 1945–1946. Generally associated with the ethnographic region known as Țara Hațegului, he was of peasant origins—during his political ascendancy, he presented himself as a destitute smallholder, but was in fact from a well-to-do family, and was himself a prosperous entrepreneur. Though enshrined in popular memory as a dimwitted blunderer, Zăroni had in fact taken an agricultural specialist's diploma in Weimar Germany, and was well-read; he was also noted as an amateur poet and author of political manifestos. Before consolidating his political partnership with Groza, he had carved out his own political path as a Romanian nationalist and an advocate of prohibition. He had caucused with the Agrarian League, and had appeared on its lists for legislative elections in 1932.

Zăroni joined Groza's protest movement in 1933, at the height of the Great Depression. As one of the Ploughmen's Front secondary leaders, he supported collaboration with other leftist groups within the Kingdom of Romania, including the underground Romanian Communist Party, but also the Hungarian People's Union or the United Socialists. Zăroni entered the public eye in 1937, when he published an anti-fascist brochure specifically aimed at the peasants; well-liked in leftist circles, it was ridiculed by the conservatives as inadequate. He himself was always seen as subservient to Groza, being consequently ridiculed as Groza's servant, or pet animal. During World War II, Groza entered the anti-fascist underground and found himself imprisoned as a result. Zăroni himself was less vocal, though he reportedly participated in some efforts to reanimate the Ploughmen's Front.

Groza and Zăroni reached their political apex after the coup of 23 August 1944, when the Communist Party and the Ploughmen's Front were allowed to participate in government. Zăroni himself entered the Second Sănătescu cabinet as a high-ranking functionary in the Ministry of Agriculture, preserving his post during the Rădescu cabinet. He then helped engineer a crisis over the issue of land reform, becoming complicit in the communist power-grab of March 1945. Groza took over as the communist-appointed Premier, advancing him to the post of Minister. Zăroni soon antagonized the communists by folding back on his conservatism, which included support for the Romanian monarchy, and by seeking to bring together like-minded members of the Front. He was made Minister of Co-Operation, then, upon the full consolidation of a socialist-republican regime, was demoted to head of Centrocoop. He was allowed to continue political work within the Great National Assembly, dying while still in office on its presidium, at age 56. He endured as the butt of many a Romanian joke, and a stock character prefiguring Bulă.

== Biography ==
=== Beginnings ===
Zăroni was born on 28 April 1906 in Hunyad County, Transylvania (the region as a whole was in the Hungarian partition of Austria-Hungary). Sources report his exact birthplace as either Hășdat (now part of Hunedoara city) or Nădăștia de Sus (later absorbed by Călan). In some descriptions, he is listed as "a simple man [and] a peasant from Țara Hațegului", located further to the south, on what was then the border with the Kingdom of Romania; his ethnic Romanian parents are known to have been named Ioan and Eva. His official biography noted that he was the son of "destitute plow-wielding peasants", and that he himself "toiled from his earliest years to for his parents' sliver of land, to earn himself a bitter loaf of bread." Various sources contradict this take, describing the Zăronis as a family of wealthy peasants, or chiaburi.

Attending primary school in Nădăștia de Sus, Romulus witnessed the union of Transylvania with Romania, during which he had enrolled at what later became Decebal National College in Deva. Young Zăroni reportedly got interested in the "workers' movements and the proletariat's struggle", which became main subjects on his reading list. He is known to have studied at an agricultural school in Weimar Germany, returning as a trained agronomist with a direct involvement in improving working techniques—back home, he set up a model farm. In October 1931, Ioan Moța's newspaper Libertatea hosted Zăroni's letter calling for a near-complete prohibition. In this text, he was also claiming that the production and sale of spirits was a Jewish business, whereby "the Jewish heathen sucks dry the soul of this nation". Rumors recorded by historians Sorin Radu and Cosmin Budeancă claim that Zăroni's first political engagement was with a right-wing group called "Agrarian League", which he represented during an election in Timișoara. The authors note that such accounts remain uncorroborated. Zăroni was however officially registered as a League candidate for the Assembly of Deputies in Hunedoara County for elections in July 1932.

Zăroni eventually rallied with the peasants' protest movement, formed in reaction to the Great Depression; as one of Petru Groza's "closest collaborators", he helped establish the Ploughmen's Front in early 1933, when he was aged 26. Unverified reports suggest that he was also Groza's employee, or "servant", at a mill in Călan-Strei. Zăroni's output included amateur poetry, taken up by the Front's newspaper Horia in 1932–1933. Samples include the fable Sătulul nu crede ălui flămând ("Those Who Have Dismiss Those Who Have Not"). In February 1933, he published therein a sketch of the Front's political program. It called on all peasants to unite into a single political-and-professional organization, while also demanding that the state abolish its courts of arbitration, or Agricultural Chambers, seeing them as instruments of exploitation. That April, speaking at the Front's first congress in Deva, he expressed the belief that the movement would soon catch on "throughout the country." He was thereafter leader of the Front's plasă-level organization in Hunedoara—in which capacity he "stood up to the landowners and the exploiters", convincing various peasants that they should never vote for the leading right- and left-wing parties. He therefore competed with a dominant agrarian force, the National Peasants' Party (PNȚ), but still had friendly contacts with some of its representatives, including Corneliu Coposu. The latter provided some biographical detail on Zăroni, reporting that he had once attended a congress of the International Agrarian Bureau in Prague.

Zăroni was fourth on the Ploughmen's Front list during the Assembly election of December 1933—his colleague Miron Belea held the top position. Their activity, and that of the Front as a whole, soon became intertwined with efforts undertaken by the underground Romanian Communist Party (PCR, or PCdR). According to the latter's official reports, Zăroni had grown "convinced that the working class, with the Communist Party at its helm, was the only political force that could express the workers' community aspirations toward a dignified and free life". He therefore militated "for the industrial workers' alliance with the toiling peasantry". Zăroni took the initiative in sealing pacts with the PCR and its satellites: in September 1935, he signed the accord of Băcia, creating an alliance between the Front and the Hungarian People's Union (MADOSZ), which represented pro-communist sections of the Hungarian Romanian community; in December, he approved of the Țebea alliance with the United Socialists. He was however supportive of drawing the PNȚ into a popular front, and once traveled to Bucharest to present his case. He also kept up with the anti-communist side of the peasants' movement, and subscribed to the more centrist Cuvântul Satelor of Șoșdea (as one of its few regular readers in all of Hunedoara County); this publication described Groza's movement and the fascist Iron Guard as equally dangerous for the peasantry.

Zăroni was largely unknown to Romanians outside of Hunedoara County, with his name only appearing rarely in the central press; he was however familiar to the Kingdom's secret service, the Siguranța, as well as to the Romanian Police. In October 1936, he appeared in Deva at Groza's trial for sedition, testifying that the prosecution witness was Groza's personal enemy. Zăroni was an unsuccessful candidate in the local election-rounds of early 1937, losing first at Deva and then at Hunedoara. Ahead of general elections in December 1937, he contributed a "propaganda brochure" advising peasants not to give in to the lure of fascist parties; he was reportedly prompted to write it after witnessing that some plughmen had preferred to join the Iron Guard. The text was admiringly quoted in the left-wing daily, Dimineața, which depicted Zăroni as a spiritual legatee of the peasant leader Vasile "Horea" Nicola; it was instead mocked by the conservative Neamul Românesc:

The arguments presented by Brother Romulus of Nădăștia are of secondary importance. What should excite all of our combative defenders of democracy is something else: namely, that the Romanian peasant, now obeying his cousin Zăronea [sic], will never but never again go 'fascist'. Messrs Mussolini and Ugo Sola may now plead with him, and so may Mr Iuliu Maniu, but the Romanian peasant will endure as he always was: a staunch democrat, a skilled plowman, an 'awakening' elector, a citizen fed on illusions and befuddled by promises. But not a fascist, never that. Especially given that fascism pushes one to work industriously for one's country, for one's kin, for one's own interest.

With this contribution, Zăroni paid public homage to the traditional institutions: nationhood, Christianity, and monarchy; describing himself as committed to all three, he also challenged the fascists' perception of either nation or faith (specifically rejecting their scientific racism, racial antisemitism, and elitism). The brochure outlined his belief that agricultural work, being equally difficult for all those engaged in it, created a natural bond between peasants of whatever nationality, and therefore that: "There is no purpose for those who live within the borders of the same country to go to war with each other, even if their mother tongue and religion should be different." His core proposal was toward the establishment of a "clean democracy", providing representation to the peasants, and blocking out all dictatorial projects. Shortly after, the Hunedoara branches of the Groza party and the PNȚ sealed an alliance with each other. Zăroni appeared on the shared electoral list, but again failed to get himself elected.

=== Political rise ===
In late 1938, Zăroni and MADOSZ's Károly Tar went on a journey to Bucharest, attempting to convince other parties that they should establish a "united front against warmongering and fascism." As noted by Tar, their demands were published by Ion Gheorghe Maurer in Zorile daily, but were already obsolete: by then, King Carol II had banned Romania's political parties, and was on his way to establish a catch-all National Renaissance Front. During World War II, which saw the establishment of successive fascist regimes in Romania, Zăroni was sporadically active—police records show him trying to revive the Ploughmen's Front clandestinely, mainly by participating in propaganda rallies, alongside Groza and others. In one of his later speeches, he himself noted as much, also commending Groza and Belea, for having been arrested or imprisoned by Ion Antonescu's "treasonous" pro-Nazi regime, after having rallied with the anti-fascist underground.

Zăroni's career took off after the coup of 23 August 1944, which toppled Antonescu and briefly restored multiparty democracy. The coup also inaugurated a Soviet occupation, saluted in the Front's propaganda as a "liberation by the glorious Army of the Soviet Union". Immediately after the coup, the reestablished Ploughmen's Front sent him to Bucharest, to negotiate the terms of a new alliance with the PCR. Zăroni claimed that he was apprehensive on his way there, having been persuaded by "Hitlerite propaganda" that the communists were extortionists and brigands, but was then pleasantly surprised that they had a generous agrarian program. Groza's group elected him as its national vice president, as well as its leader in Hunedoara; on 26 October, he presided over the Front's regional congress, also attended by the MADOSZ and by the PCR's Ana Pauker. In December, Zăroni was inducted by the Romanian Society for Friendship with the Soviet Union, as a board member of its "Peasant Life" section. He was also a member of the Front's central committee—he served therein down to a general congress on 24 June 1945, when he joined the executive committee. As vice president of the Front, always assisted by the PCR, he began expanding and consolidating the party in most of the country's regions.

From 4 November 1944, Zăroni had been serving in the Second Sănătescu cabinet as the Second Minister of Agriculture and Undersecretary of State, charged with overseeing a new land reform. The PCR's journalist, Grigore Preoteasa, commented at the time that Zăroni had thus become "the first true ploughman" to enter a national government. The PCR's Scînteia reported that Zăroni's first activities included requisitioning all forests around Bucharest, to prop up the city's firewood supply, as well as efforts to obtain that some young peasants be exempted from the draft (and consequently from service on the Eastern Front), in order to be available as hired hands in the sowing campaign. He also attended a peasant rally at Caracal, stirring up controversy by telling his audience that he would allow them to plow and reap on any unworked land. This, alongside statements by his colleague Ștefan Prună, was taken as an invitation to full-own confiscation of large states—both were criticized as irresponsible by the National Liberal Viitorul, but then defended by Pavel Chirtoacă in Scînteia.

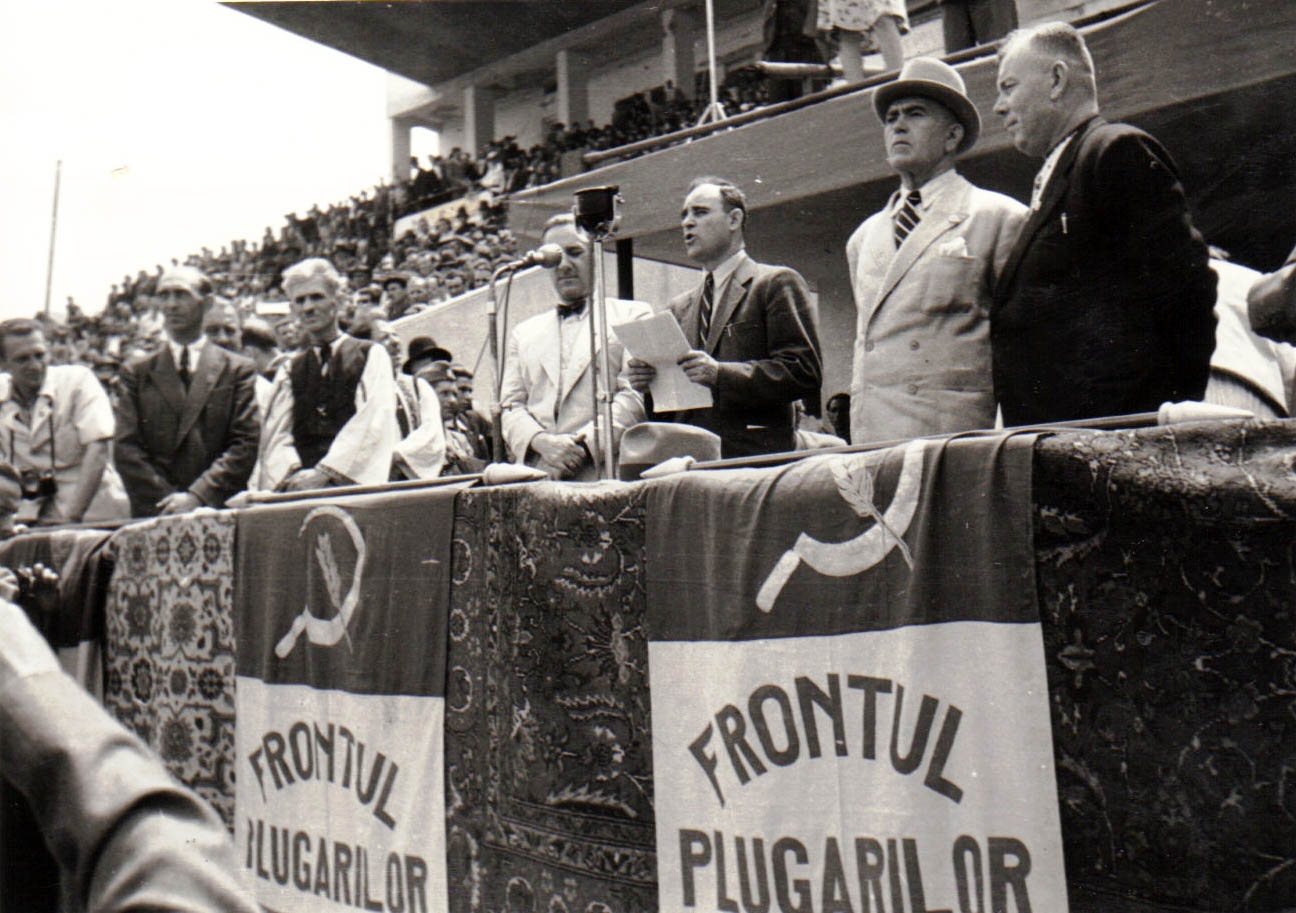
Ploughman's Front rally on 24 June 1945. Right to left: Zăroni, Groza, Gheorghe Gheorghiu-Dej, Mihai Ralea, Miron Belea, two unknowns

Zăroni maintained his position in the Rădescu cabinet, to 28 February 1945. He was serving directly under the titular minister of agriculture, who was Ioan Hudiță of the PNȚ. The two men openly disputed with each other—during the first days of January 1945, Groza was called in to "patch things up" between them. By February, the matter of sowing had become another issue of contention, since Hudiță was calling for massive imports of seeds from the Soviet Union, whereas Zăroni viewed these as unnecessary; his assessements were backed by a "Group of Democratic Agricultural Engineers" (GIAD). Commenting on the issue, the communist economist Costin Murgescu speculated that Hudiță was creating a scenario in which the resulting famine would be blamed on the Soviets' refusal to assist. On 10 February, Zăroni stepped down from the commission on land reform, contributing directly to a crisis which resulted in government being toppled by the PCR. The PCR-dominated National Democratic Front (FND) embarked on a series of protests; during one of these, guests included a GIAD man, credited simply as Vodă. In his speech, Vodă reported that Zăroni had inspected rural areas, and had found peasants who were "unclothed, barefooted, unfed", and that Hudiță, a landowners' advocate, had allowed this situation to continue.

On 6 March 1945, with Groza taking over as Premier, Zăroni became Minister of Agriculture and Secretary of State. He immediately used this position to advance the land-reform agenda, but in a form adapted to the PCR and his party's own political interests. He was also said to have been highly beneficial for Nădaștia, directing funds toward having its main road paved, and also erecting its House of Culture. His other activities included attending the 13 March celebration in Cluj, which marked the Romanian recovery of Northern Transylvania; he traveled there by train, alongside junior members of the parliamentary opposition, as well as PCR leader Gheorghe Gheorghiu-Dej and Soviet envoy Andrey Vyshinsky. At that stage, Groza and Zăroni managed to subdue the opposition at Cuvântul Satelor, which was relaunched as a propaganda sheet for the Ploughmen's Front.

One eyewitness report from Hunedoara indicates that Zăroni and his wife owned some 16 hectares (40 acres) of land between them, and also that they may have also operated their own threshing machine. He was also said to have employed locals as his sharecroppers, in exchange for one head of swine each year. Around November 1945, Zăroni and Belea, supported by Mihail Ghelmegeanu, were setting themselves against the PCR, advocating "complete independence" for their Front; they also clarified that they still supported the monarchy. Their "Deva group" was actively undermined by card-carrying PCR men who still had Front membership, including Constantin Agiu and Stanciu Stoian, who openly identified their rivals as "kulaks" (culaci) and "right-wingers". The Front and the FND, now called "Bloc of Democratic Parties" (BPD) still had Zăroni as a candidate in the legislative election of November 1946, during which he took a seat in the Assembly of Deputies for Târnava-Mică County. In a since-declassified document, he himself suggested that the vote was rigged, since in reality some 70 or 80% of the electorate had favored the opposition (in his view, the BPD was despised by the regular folk only because of the PCR's callousness and incompetence).

=== Sidelining and final years ===
Upon a reshuffle on 30 November 1946, Zăroni was made Minister of Co-operation. On 3 December, he participated in the swearing-in ceremony of his successor at Agriculture, Traian Săvulescu, noting in his speech that he had been "called to lead another department"; also then, Săvulescu honor him as the "artisan of the land reform." As claimed by his official biographies, Zăroni "devoted all his energy and power to the establishment of the people's democratic regime and the construction of socialism." During his tenure at Co-operation, the monarchy was abolished, leading to the establishment of a Romanian people's republic; the BPD was similarly transformed into a People's Democratic Front (FDP). A program of nationalization was also being enacted, sparking controversy within the government arc: as noted by journalist György Beke, Zăroni's ministry took over the private co-operatives, which were almost universally managed by Hungarian Romanian peasants, despite being met with repeated protests from Gyárfás Kurkó of the MADOSZ. In the election of March 1948, Zăroni successfully ran for a renewal of his parliamentary mandate, being first on the FDP electoral list in Târnava-Mică. The Assembly of Deputies was soon after transformed into a Great National Assembly, in which he continued to serve for the remainder of his life.

Zăroni moved into a villa at General Angelescu Street 93, which had once been owned by the anti-communist journalist Pamfil Șeicaru, who had since fled abroad. It is possible, but not fully attested, that he completed his education during his time in office, as a part-time student at the University of Bucharest Faculty of Agronomy. According to oral tradition, his graduation project was a "superb orchard" in Nădaștia. He was however dissatisfied with his first wife, Tița, who could not take to life in Bucharest, and divorced her; his second wife, Ștefania, was younger, and had worked as a store clerk in the capital. He was by then in full-blown conflict with the governing "Romanian Workers' Party" (or PMR), as the PCR was known during that stage of its history; as a result, he was deposed from his ministerial post on 13 April 1948, and sent to manage the consumers' co-operative network, or Centrocoop. He was instead awarded a seat on the presidium of the Great National Assembly, on which he served between 1948 and 1952; from June 1949, he also sat on the Romanian Orthodox Church's deliberative body, wherein he represented the Archdiocese of Arad.

Zăroni had by then reemerged as a supporter of agricultural collectivization, reportedly informing his Nădaștia colleagues that they were to relinquish their lands and obey the PMR like soldiers their commanding officers—even as the Securitate had already been called in to arrest dissenters. Ahead of parliamentary elections in November 1952, he switched seats, becoming a representative of Ilia precinct, in Hunedoara Region. When the Ploughmen's Front was disestablished in February 1953, he was sent over to Constanța Region, so that he could oversee the merger of local chapters into the PMR. In 1955, he himself requested, and obtained, membership in the PMR. Stripped of his Centrocoop office, though not also of his parliamentary seat, he was professionally integrated as manager of a collectivized farm in Tunari, outside Bucharest.

Zăroni was still a member of the Great National Assembly presidium after elections in February 1957. He joined Constantin Pîrvulescu, Avram Bunaciu, Mihai Beniuc and other PMR parliamentarians on their April–May visit to Maoist China. In August, he received North Vietnam's Ho Chi Minh at the Great National Assembly palace. In January 1958, Zăroni spoke at Groza's funeral, alongside much better situated politicians—including the PMR General Secretary Gheorghe Gheorghiu-Dej and Russian Premier Frol Kozlov. Returning at the Centrocoop as a vice president and member of the executive committee, he also delivered the closing speech at the third co-operatives congress in December 1958. In May 1959, he was part of the delegation welcoming North Korea's Choe Yong-gon on his visit to Bucharest. On 24 December 1960, while still a vice president of Centrocoop, he was elected on the FDP's central council.

Zăroni died on 23 October 1962. Some sources inform that this was "after a long period of severe suffering", while others mention that his cause of death was a heart attack. Two days later, his body was laid in state at the Trade Unions' House of Culture, with several party leaders (including Alexandru Moghioroș and Florian Dănălache) serving as his honor guard; he was then taken to burial, by oxcart, to Ghencea Cemetery. He was reportedly buried with no religious service. This was viewed as a grave sin by members of his village community, who blamed the decision on his widow Ștefania. In 1967, a proposal was considered by the communist authorities, whereby Zăroni's remains would have been dug up, cremated, then assigned a crypt in the Monument of the Heroes for the Freedom of the People and of the Motherland, for Socialism (located in Carol Park).

Ștefania herself died soon after her husband, when a brick fell on her head. Villagers described as either an act of divine retribution for her keeping company with a married man, or homicide committed by that man's enraged wife. The former minister was also survived by four children: Romulus Jr, Victoria and Remus, all from his first marriage, and Ovidiu, from his second. Of these, Romulus Jr was a successful engineer, and in 1965 the co-recipient of a Romanian Academy prize for his contribution to perfecting air purge systems. However, his beginnings in the profession had been tinged by controversy, with the PNȚ alleging that his father had illegally obtained a transfer for him from Timișoara Technical School to the more prestigious Bucharest Polytechnic. Ovidiu, who reached the rank of Colonel in the Romanian Land Forces, was the only one of Zăroni children still alive in 2013 (Remus is believed to have died while working on the last stages of the Danube–Black Sea Canal).

== Public image ==
As a parliamentarian, Zăroni struck an unusual note, and was seen as "a bit artistic" by one of his fellow peasants, for always wearing a folk costume. During his ministerial tenure, he also acquired the image of a fumbling cretin—"semi-literate, mediocre, incompetent". He became the first and, until Nicolae Ceaușescu, the only communist-era politician to be the constant butt of the joke. Writer Tita Chiper believes that Zăroni set the bar low with his incompetence, but that afterwards Romanians became aware that his type of behavior was to be expected from whole categories of new figures ("the Russian", "the activist", "the Militiaman"), who gradually replaced him in folklore. As once noted by journalist Tudor Octavian, Zăroni stood out among Romanian politicians for being "at all times cretinous" (tâmpit tot timpul), that which made him unforgettable.

The PCR was aware of Zăroni's reputation, and occasionally responded. In August 1946, the party newspaper Moldova Liberă reacted against derisive commentary published by an unnamed opposition journalist in Dreptatea, responding that: "the exploiters at Dreptatea [...] imagine that the most elegant form of irony is to poke fun at the peasant-minister Zăroni and his cultural level". Zăroni's image was further enshrined by clandestine epigrams, most likely penned by Păstorel Teodoreanu, which referred to him as Groza's pet ox, an Incitatus to his Caligula. Journalist Virgil Lazăr, who attended an electoral rally in Sighișoara as a child, recalls that Groza had in fact presented Zăroni "as if he was trading a horse", by emphasizing the fact that he was "well-built, fit as can be for the job [of minister]". In Hunedoara, peasant interviewees regarded Zăroni as "not bright", and fit for his office "like parsley is to soup".

Formerly a communist journalist, Victor Russu claimed to have seen Groza himself greatly amused by the jokes which circulated about his associate, whom the popular imagination had turned into a stock character, prefiguring "Bulă". As a result, "[Zăroni] was preserved in collective memory long after he no longer held any political offices, with his activity in tackling land reform and the collectivization of agriculture, but most of all with his many blunders." Examples of his inability to comprehend urban etiquette include his rumored habit of wearing gloves on his hand and holding up a third glove, "to fan himself with", or his mistaking a flush toilet for a phone booth; he is also claimed to have been unbothered by his own persistent foot odor, changing his socks but never washing his feet. Outside of legend, Zăroni's wardrobe choices are known to have created public embarrassment—in January 1946, he attended a show at the Bucharest Opera in his usual folk dress, "the strings of his longjohns hanging out of his trousers". He was a recipient of the Order of the Crown of Romania, and, historian Tudor-Radu Tiron notes, committed a faux-pas by wearing its ribbon on his peasant shirt.

In his 1988 memoir, Russu argued that, despite being Groza's "creature", Zăroni was overall "cunning" (șiret). Reportedly, he always had a deep admiration for Petre Țuțea, the right-wing philosopher (and eventual prisoner of the communist regime). The popular consensus on Zăroni's stupidity was openly challenged after the Romanian Revolution of 1989 by several people who knew Zăroni, such as some of his former rivals inside the PNȚ. They include Corneliu Coposu, who once visited Zăroni in his home, being impressed by his fluency in German and his study room, with as many as 800 books on show. Gabriel Țepelea, a PNȚ man and a literary historian, has similar recollections from having traveled together with Zăroni in 1945. As Țepelea reports: "Contrary to the humorous folklore that had come to target Zăroni, he sure didn't seem to me like he was intellectually inferior. In fact, he himself had a sense of humor, recounting, with a sort of studied nonchalance, some of the jokes and anecdotes that had him for a protagonist." Another such claim had been advanced in 1998 by journalist Silviu N. Dragomir: "I learned from verified sources that he carried around a special notepad, in which he wrote down all the jokes and epigrams that circulated at his expense."
