= Ploughmen's Front =

Romanian political party

Ploughmen's Front Frontul Plugarilor
- Leader: Petru Groza
- Founded: 1933
- Dissolved: 1953
- Split from: People's Party
- Ideology: Republicanism; Agrarian socialism Left-wing populism Revolutionary socialism
- Political position: Left-wing
- Colours: Red

Party flag

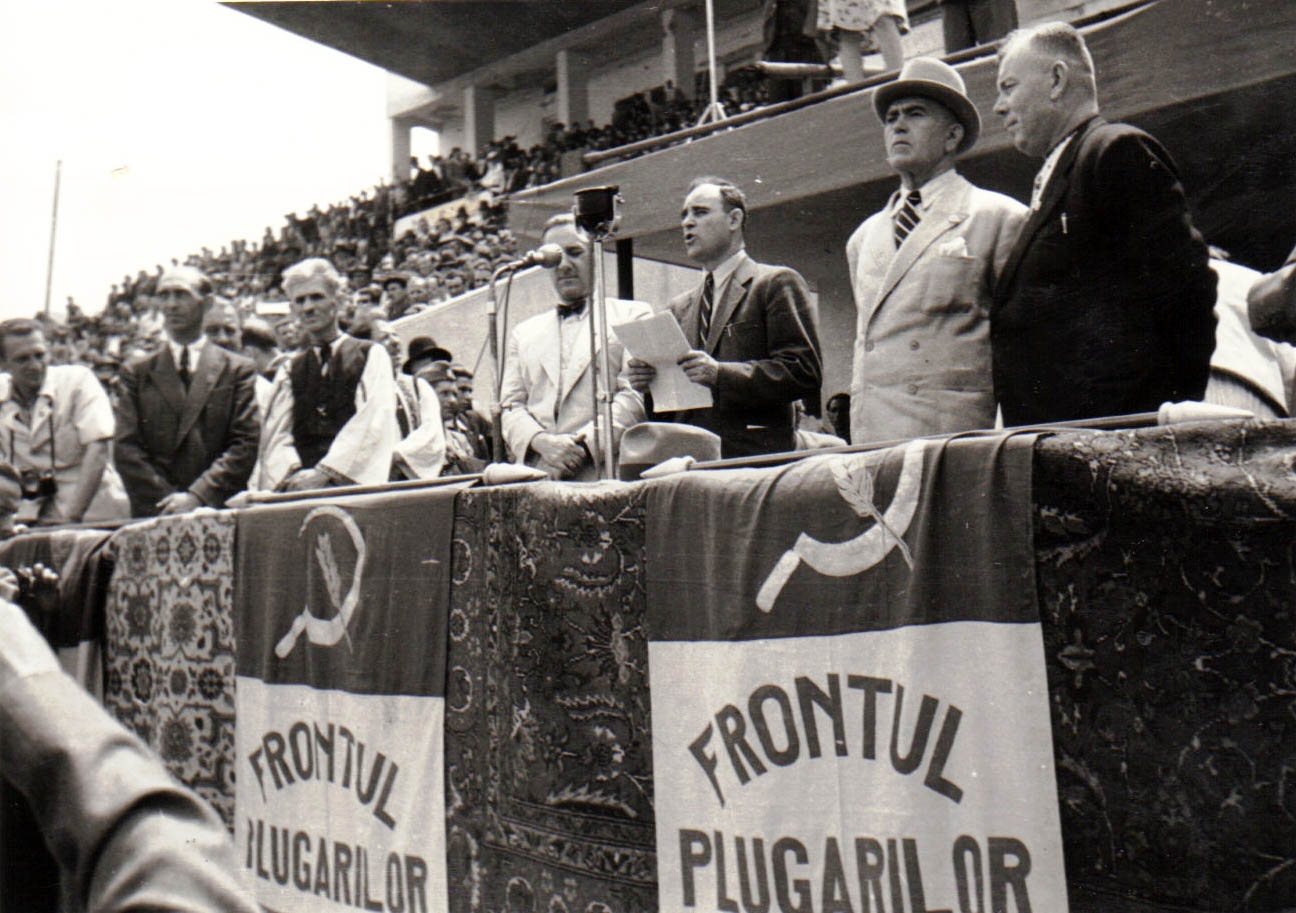
June 1945 rally at Stadionul Republicii. From left to right: Romulus Zăroni (at microphone), Gheorghe Gheorghiu-Dej (speaking), Petru Groza (wearing hat), Mihai Ralea

The Ploughmen's Front (Romanian: Frontul Plugarilor) was a Romanian left-wing agrarian-inspired political organisation of ploughmen, founded at Deva in 1933 and led by Petru Groza. At its peak in 1946, the Front had over 1 million members.

== History ==
Begun in Hunedoara County, it quickly spread into the Banat, and then into the other regions of Romania. Groza, who had been a minister in Alexandru Averescu's People's Party cabinet (1926), aimed to improve the situation of the peasantry (which he believed had been betrayed by the main agrarian group, the National Peasants' Party), calling for a social security program in the countryside and tax reform favourable to small holdings. The group was also republican in ambitions, probably from the moment it was created (before 1940, Groza was recorded to have said "my last king was Decebalus, after whose death I became a republican"). According to Corneliu Coposu, the Front was funded by the Red aid.

In 1935, the organisation aligned itself with the outlawed Romanian Communist Party (PCR), an agreement inspired by the Stalinist Popular Front doctrine and signed in Țebea (after negotiations overseen by Scarlat Callimachi).

During this period, the Ploughmen's Front never obtained more than 0.30% of the vote. Outlawed together with all parties in 1938, through a law passed by the authoritarian regime of King Carol II, it remained active in clandestinity during the dictatorial rule of Ion Antonescu (when Groza was detained in 1943–1944), and surfaced after its fall in 1944 and the start of Soviet ascendancy and influence (see Romania during World War II).

In October of that year, it joined other the PCR-led National Democratic Front (FND), alongside the Union of Patriots, the Union of Hungarian Workers, the Socialist Peasants' Party, and the Romanian Social Democratic Party (the Ploughmen's Front absorbed the Socialist Peasants' Party one month later).

In February 1945, although represented inside the Nicolae Rădescu cabinet (as it had been in the Constantin Sănătescu one) it took part in violent incidents that led to its fall. Groza, who was first considered for high political office in late 1944, led the third cabinet after the fall of Antonescu (formed on March 6, 1945); while the government was maneuvered by the PCR, the Ploughmen's Front did hold the Ministry of Agriculture and Royal Domains, which was assigned to Romulus Zăroni, and that of Culture and Arts, which was assigned to Mihai Ralea. In late 1947, Stanciu Stoian became another one of the party's leading members to be presiding over a ministry — that of Religious Affairs; additionally, Octav Liveazeanu became head on the Information Ministry.

The party ran on a single platform with the PCR during the 1946 general election, which the Groza cabinet won through large-scale electoral fraud, and had PCR activists such as Constantin Agiu among its nominal members. It thus played an active part in the proceedings leading to the creation of Communist Romania.

At the time, PCR leaders began using Antonescu's 1943 crackdown on the Front as an instrument in intra-party fights: after General Secretary Gheorghiu-Dej had ordered his predecessor Ștefan Foriș to be abducted and held in secrecy, it was alleged that Foriș' collaborator Remus Koffler had functioned as an agent for the former secret service (Siguranța Statului), and that he had engineered Groza's arrest.

Nevertheless, relations between the Front and Communists were tested at times: after its first congress (July 1945), Groza's party called for the preservation of small, privately owned, agricultural plots and voluntary cooperative farming instead of the collectivization advocated by the PCR; in the period known as the "Royal strike" (beginning in the autumn of 1945 and marked by King Mihai I's refusal to sign his name to legislation advocated by the government), Groza, urged on by Zăroni and Mihail Ghelmegeanu, objected to Soviet pressures on the monarch and even threatened Vasile Luca that he would withdraw support for the PCR. Eventually, the Front gave in to Communist demands (as a politician whose career survived the group's demise, Groza continued to sporadically clash with the PCR).

In July 1947, the Front was joined by Nicolae D. Cornățeanu and other members of the defunct National Union for Work and Reconstruction (a small political grouping formed by Constantin Argetoianu), and, in 1948, it absorbed the National Peasants' Party–Alexandrescu (a splinter group of the National Peasants' Party).

The Ploughmen's Front ceased to exist when it dissolved itself in 1953. According to the 1991 testimony of former PCR leader Gheorghe Apostol, the latter action was instigated by the main party; he also indicated that, in retrospect, Gheorghiu-Dej had found such measures taken against pluralism to be regrettable ("Dej himself said: «What a stupid thing we have done! We could at least have allowed the Ploughmen's Front to exist!»).

== Electoral history ==
=== Legislative elections ===
| Election | Votes | % | Seats | +/– | Position |
|---|---|---|---|---|---|
| 1933 | 7,970 | 0.3% | 0 / 387 | — | 14th |
| 1946 | 4,773,689 | 69.8% | 70 / 414 | ▲70 | ▲1st^{1} |
| 1948 | 6,959,936 | 93.2% | 126 / 414 | ▲56 | 1st^{2} |
| 1952 | 10,187,833 | 100% | 428 / 428 | ▲302 | 1st^{3} |

Notes:

^{1} BDP members: PSDR (81 deputies), PNL-Tătărescu (75 deputies), Ploughmen's Front, Romanian Communist Party (68 deputies), National Popular Party (26 deputies), PNȚ-Alexandrescu (20 deputies), and 8 independents.

^{2} FDP members in 1948: Romanian Workers Party and affiliates (190 deputies and 11 independent deputies affiliated to PMR group), Ploughmen's Front, National Popular Party (43 deputies), Hungarian People's Union (30 deputies), and Jewish Democratic Committee (5 deputies).

^{3} FDP members in 1952: Romanian Workers Party and independent affiliates, Ploughmen's Front, Hungarian People's Union, and Jewish Democratic Committee. The distribution of mandates is unclear.
