= Decebal National College =

- Colegiul Național Decebal

Location
- 1 Decembrie 1918 street, Nr. 22; Deva, Hunedoara County; Romania; 45.8833°N 22.9008°E

Information
- Type: Public
- Motto: Centru educațional de excelență și nucleu cultural emergent (Educational center of excellence and emerging cultural nucleus); Mereu mai buni (Always better)
- Established: 1871
- Headmaster: Marin Florin Ilieș
- Website: www.cnd.ro

Decebal National College (Colegiul Național Decebal) is a high school in Deva, Romania. Its headmaster is Marin Florin Ilieș.

== Alumni ==
- Adrian Sitaru (1990)
- Romulus Zăroni
