= National Peasants' Party–Alexandrescu =

Romanian political party

The National Peasants' Party–Alexandrescu (Romanian: Partidul Național Țărănesc–Alexandrescu, PNȚ-A) was a political party in Romania.

== History ==
The party was established as a breakaway from the National Peasants' Party (PNȚ) and was led by Anton Alexandrescu. In May 1946, it was one of the political parties that established the Bloc of Democratic Parties (BPD), alongside the Romanian Social Democratic Party (PSDR), the National Liberal Party–Tătărescu (PNL-T), the Ploughmen's Front (FP), the Romanian Communist Party (PCR), and the National Popular Party (PNP). In the fraudulent November 1946 elections, the Bloc won 347 of the 414 seats, with the PNȚ-A taking 20. Subsequently, in 1948, the party merged into the Ploughmen's Front (FP).

== Election results ==
=== Parliamentary elections ===
Election	Votes	%	Seats	+/–	Position
1946	Part of the BDP		20 / 414	–	8th
