= 1952 Romanian parliamentary election =

- 30 November 1952

All 428 seats in the Great National Assembly
- Turnout: 97.91%
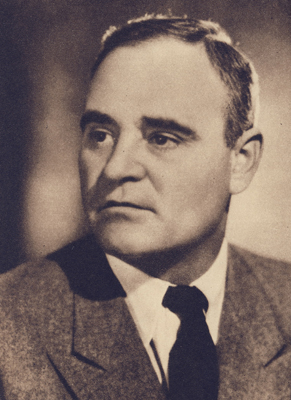
	First party
Leader	Gheorghe Gheorghiu-Dej
Party	PMR
Alliance	FDP
Seats won	428
Seat change	▲23
Popular vote	10,187,833
Percentage	100.00%
Swing	▲6.81pp
Prime Minister before election
Gheorghe
Gheorghiu-Dej
PMR
Elected Prime Minister
Gheorghe
Gheorghiu-Dej
PMR

Parliamentary elections were held in Romania on 30 November 1952. They were the second held under communist rule, and the first under a constitution adopted that September. They were also the first held after longtime Prime Minister Petru Groza handed the post to Gheorghe Gheorghiu-Dej, who as leader of the communist Romanian Workers' Party (PMR) had been the country's de facto leader since the communists seized full power in 1947.

Voters were presented with a single slate of candidates from the People's Democratic Front (FDP), which was dominated by PMR. The Front won all 428 seats in the Great National Assembly. This election set the tone for all elections held in Romania until 1989. For the remainder of the communist era, voters only had the choice of approving or rejecting a communist-dominated list.

== Electoral system ==
The new constitution was promulgated on 24 September 1952 and three days later a new electoral law was passed. Under the new system candidates were elected in single member constituencies, and had to receive over 50% of the vote. If no candidate passed this threshold, or if voter turnout in the constituency was less than 50%, re-runs were held until the requirements were met. Candidates could be nominated by the FDP or mass organisations, although the latter were monitored by the Front.

== Results ==
Graph of the party split among 428 seats.
Party or alliance		Votes	%	Seats
People's Democratic Front	Romanian Workers Party	10,187,833	100.00	428
People's Democratic Front	Ploughmen's Front	10,187,833	100.00	428
People's Democratic Front	Hungarian People's Union	10,187,833	100.00	428
People's Democratic Front	Jewish Democratic Committee	10,187,833	100.00	428
People's Democratic Front	Independents	10,187,833	100.00	428
Total		10,187,833	100.00	428
Valid votes		10,187,833	98.40	
Invalid/blank votes		165,656	1.60	
Total votes		10,353,489	100.00	
Registered voters/turnout		10,574,475	97.91	
Source: Nohlen & Stöver
