= Jewish Democratic Committee =

Jewish Democratic Committee Comitetul Democrat Evreiesc הוועד הדמוקרטי היהודי Demokrata Zsidó Komité
- Chairman: M. H. Maxy (1945; 1946–1948); Lică Chiriță (1945–1946); Paul Iscovici (1948); Bercu Feldman (1949); Barbu Lăzăreanu (1949–1953)
- Founded: 7 June 1945
- Dissolved: 16 March 1953
- Preceded by: General Jewish Council; Jewish People's Democratic Alliance; Union of the Working Land of Israel
- Newspaper: Unirea (1945–1951); Viața Nouă (1951–1953)
- Cultural wing: Yidisher Kultur Farband
- Youth wing: Front of the Jewish Democratic Youth
- Female wing: CDE Female Section
- Membership: 20,000 (1950 est.)
- Ideology: Jewish community interests Socialism (Jewish); Jewish secularism Yiddishism; Anti-Zionism; Producerism; Anti-fascism; Minorities: Communism; Labour Zionism (to 1948); Assimilationism
- Political position: Centre-left to far-left
- National affiliation: Jewish Representation (1946); People's Democratic Front (1948)
- International affiliation: World Jewish Congress

The Jewish Democratic Committee or Democratic Jewish Committee (Romanian: Comitetul Democrat Evreiesc, CDE, also Comitetul Democrat Evreesc, Comitetul Democratic Evreiesc; Hebrew: הוועד הדמוקרטי היהודי; Hungarian: Demokrata Zsidó Komité, DZSK) was a left-wing political party which sought to represent Jewish community interests in Romania. Opposed to the orientation of most Romanian Jews, who supported right-wing Zionism as embodied by the Jewish Party (PER), the CDE was in practice a front for the Romanian Communist Party (PCR); its chairmen M. H. Maxy, Bercu Feldman, and Barbu Lăzăreanu were card-carrying communists. Initially, its anti-Zionism was limited by a recruitment drive among Labour Zionists, which allowed the party to absorb the local variant of Poale Zion. Additionally, the CED was directed against the Union of Romanian Jews (UER), a more traditional vehicle of assimilationism. It annexed an UER dissidence under Moise Zelțer-Sărățeanu, while also taking over chapters of Ihud and accepting in Jewish affiliates of the Romanian Social Democratic Party.

For the November 1946 elections, the CDE ran a Jewish Representation list, closely allied with the PCR. It took one of two Jewish seats in the Assembly of Deputies, and joined the parliamentary coalition backing Petru Groza's cabinet. Such support hinged on Groza's promises to restore Jewish property that had been confiscated in the Holocaust. At the time, the CDE was also involved in relief efforts for homeless returnees, as well as singling out alleged Holocaust perpetrators. Part of its mission was a control over religious Jews through the Federation of the Jewish Communities in Romania, which was placed under the left-leaning rabbi Moses Rosen.

The CDE was averse to the illegal exodus of Jews into Mandatory Palestine, seeking to document, control, and finally suppress it. It presented Jews with the option of integrating into a socialist economy, emphasising producerist guidelines and condemning parasitism. The Romanian regime recognised Israel, but failed in its project of communising the Romanian Jewish colony. Following this, the CDE was given the go-ahead to publish criticism of Israeli society, hoping to persuade Jewish workers into renouncing Zionism. It opposed Hebrew revivalism and promoted instead a Yiddishist alternative, as manifested by its direct supervision of the Barașeum.

The CDE could still join the People's Democratic Front for the elections of March 1948, when it increased its representation to five deputies. However, its activities were restrained by the newly-inaugurated communist regime, whose leadership came to suspect that Zionism had seeped into CDE policies. In late 1948, the Labour Zionists parted ways with the CDE, with some attempting to reorganize as a local section of Mapam. Under Feldman's leadership, the CDE began "unmasking" campaigns, which, from 1949, resulted in a thorough purge of its own national and regional structures; it also opposed the regime's temporary relaxation of emigration restrictions. The Committee was pressed into dissolving itself in March 1953, when it proclaimed that Jews had been fully integrated into the new society. The regime's clampdown on Zionism contradicted this statement, as did the large-scale popularity of emigration projects, lasting into the 1980s, and directly encouraged by Rabbi Rosen.

== History ==
=== Creation ===
Historian Corneliu Crăciun notes that the PCR attempt to dominate the Romanian Jewish community upon the end of World War II was part of an "aggressive and all-encompassing strategy" to extend control into all areas of society. In doing so, communists relied on political traditions (including the over-representation of Jews within its own ranks), as well on the monopolisation of anti-fascist discourse by the Soviet Union after the Holocaust: "Given the Jewish people's suffering at the hands of fascism, it seemed that PCR members could do no wrong, and that their moral-political investment would turn a profit." In September 1944, some days after the anti-fascist coup, the PCR contributed to the creation of a General Jewish Council. This initiative crumbled in October, when other Council representatives, rejecting the implication that "all Jews are communists", refused to join Petru Groza's National Democratic Front. From September 1944, Labour Zionism was taken up in Romania by Ihud, which immediately signed up to the National Democratic Front's platform and, internationally, acted as a section of Mapai. In November, Romania's Labour Zionists formed a Union of the Working Land of Israel (Brith Eretz Israel HaOvedet, BEIH)—federating Ihud, Poale Zion, Ahdut HaAvoda, as well as a former affiliate of Hashomer Hatzair called Mishmar.

The PCR had more success in Northern Transylvania, which had been reattached to Romania during the Budapest Offensive. At Cluj, survivors of extermination camps set up the Jewish Democratic Group (GDE), an association backed by communist agents. A Jewish People's Democratic Community (CPED), originally called Jewish Anti-hitlerite Group, was co-opted on the Northern Transylvanian Democratic Committee, which functioned as a quasi-government of the region. It was led by a communist cadre and Holocaust survivor, Hillel Kohn, but failed to obey PCR commands by insisting for the restitution of assets confiscated during the Holocaust, as well as for the "protection of unhindered freedom of emigration". More to the south, Arad hosted a Union of Democratic Jews, which, in October 1944, inaugurated a process to restore property confiscated under fascism.

From Bucharest, painter M. H. Maxy and lawyer Iosif Șraier resumed the project to give pro-communist Jews a national representation. Șraier was a noted PCR middleman, having spent the interwar as a public defender for communist prisoners. The CDE effort was officially sanctioned by PCR Secretary Gheorghe Gheorghiu-Dej while visiting Templul Coral on 25 April 1945, and advanced on 2 June, when Șraier negotiated with David "Dadu" Rosenkranz. The latter, a wartime humanitarian, had been active with the UER before moving into left-wing politics. The Committee was established with a constitutive session on 7 June 1945, though it was only truly active from 22 July. Its first Chairman was Maxy, but only for a short period. According to various reports, it was originally named "Jewish National Committee", and was led in 1945–1946 by Lică (Abramovici) Chiriță.

From the beginning, it was a satellite organisation of the PCR: its first-ever meetings were attended by PCR envoy Vasile Luca, supported by two Jewish party colleagues—Maxy and industrialist Emil Calmanovici. According to historian Idith Zertal, it functioned as "an impossible conglomerate of the Communists, the socialist Zionist groups, and leftist political parties, as well as Yiddishist organizations. Its true, main purpose was to mobilize support for Groza's government within the Jewish community". Scholar Carol Iancu moreover argues that: "The Communists tried to control the communities by positioning their representatives in key positions, and finally by imposing their will. The Jewish Democratic Committee [...] was to put this policy into practice by both weakening (and later on suppressing) the two large pre-war Jewish organizations, the Jewish Party and the Union of Romanian Jews."

Imitating communist organisational structures to the point of creating its own Politburo, the new group was both formally and informally dominated by PCR activists, some of whom were integrated into its official leadership. Examples include Maxy, writer Barbu Lăzăreanu, doctors Maximilian Popper and Arthur Kreindler; Maxy returned as the CDE's Chairman in 1946–1948. They served alongside writers Ury Benador and Emil Dorian, the latter leaving skeptical notes with insight into the CDE's role as an amorphous organisation serving PCR commands. Historian Lucian Lucian Zeev-Herșcovici notes that power in the party rested mainly with second-rank PCR cadres, namely Bercu Feldman, Herman Leibovici-Șerban, and Israel Bacalu. According to Iancu, Feldman was a "fanatical" among his fellow communists.

=== Expansion ===
1945 logo of the Romanian Dror

Local bodies were quickly integrated into the countrywide structure—on 25 March, the Cluj GDE became a CDE territorial office. In October, it was joined by other Northern Transylvanian organisations, with the CPED, gradually diminished in importance, also finally recorded as a regional CDE branch. Kohn remained in charge of the CDE provincial chapter (seconded by Sándor Neumann). His past had by then come under review, resulting in his expulsion from the PCR on grounds that he was a "Hungarian nationalist"; he was allowed to maintain his CDE profile, but gradually withdrew from active politics.

CDE figures other than the communist core had double affiliations, including, from April 1946, Jewish members of the Romanian Social Democratic Party (PSDR), six of whom were co-opted on the CDE leadership board. BEIH was absorbed as an autonomous section of the CDE, with 9 representatives in leadership; through it, the Committee exercised authority over the Romanian chapters of Ihud, Poale Zion, and Mishmar. Theodor Loewenstein-Lavi of the Ihud joined the ranks of CDE activists. With this incorporation of Labour Zionism, the CDE effectively split the Romanian Zionist Executive, isolating the PER's right-wing. CDE influence eventually grew within the Executive, which came to be controlled by the Ihud. The CDE youth section, called Front of the Jewish Democratic Youth (FTDE), included Zionist factions within the BEIH, as well as all groups federated into the HeHalutz: Bnei Akiva, Borochovia, Dror, Gordonia, and several more.

Other figures continued to be active with the Yidisher Kultur Farband (YIKUF) and with a breakaway faction of the UER—Rosenkranz was joined by leader Moise Zelțer-Sărățeanu and his followers. Such affiliates were described as "temporary allies" of the Groza regime. Historian Lucian Nastasă identifies CDE maneuvering as directly responsible for the UER's weakening, as well as for directing, through Zelțer-Sărățeanu, a "firebrand campaign" against the PER leader, A. L. Zissu. Maxy was also an instigator of attacks on Zissu, whom he described as a proxy for reactionary politics. Nastasă additionally argues that, once created, the Committee was able to assume a dominant position, forcing all other Jewish organisations to relate to it. As noted by Crăciun, the PCR had in practice a plurality of the 40 seats on the CDE leadership board, with 15 in all: 9 were PCR envoys or close allies, and 6 more came by way of Zelțer-Sărățeanu's movement. This phenomenon was noted in the provincial sections: CDE leaders in Fălciu County included 9 PCR men, 7 Zionists, and 6 with other or no affiliation; at Sighetu Marmației, the executive board had 10 PCR members, ahead of Aguda with 5; at Oravița, there were 40 CDE members in town, of whom 19 were communists.

The CDE was expected to administer Jewish community affairs, which included direct control over the apolitical Federation of the Jewish Communities in Romania (FCER). At the first CDE meetings, Luca already indicated that the CDE was fundamentally anti-Zionist, while also expressing his disapproval of Jews who voted for mainstream Romanian parties. In October 1945, Luca engaged in polemics with Chiriță, who stood accused of not endorsing class conflict. According to Luca, "the Jewish worker fits in with the communist party especially", whereas capitalists, even those of Jewish extraction, endured as "great enemies of the Jewish people". Luca surmised that the Committee was best suited to engage in attacks on the Jewish bourgeoisie, since it was shielded from accusations of antisemitism. In his replies, Chiriță insisted that Jews turned to illegal trading because the CDE could still not provide them with meaningful employment. After that moment, the Committee endorsed "re-stratification", a policy whereby Jewish workers and experts were reclaimed by the Romanian economy, usually by joining cooperatives. This process was directed by the PCR, which injected a producerist agenda into the platforms of subordinate Jewish organisations. Overall, it "took charge of orienting Jewish youth toward manual trades, and away from traditional liberal professions such as jurisprudence, medicine, or journalism."

For a while after its creation, the CDE modeled its stances regarding Zionism on contextual policies of the Soviet Union and Jewish Anti-Fascist Committee. As summarised by Nastasă, it made no real effort to tackle Labour Zionism, and regarded the phenomenon as mostly utopian, "with little chance of ever creating an Israeli state." Committee man Dinu Hervian declared in February 1946 that the group had an instrumental reason for not overtly discouraging Zionism: "[Romanian] reactionaries are opposed to the emigration tendency as present among a large portion of our Jewish population. By attacking reactionaries and supporting the sentimental attachment that some Jews hold in respect to Zionism, we can also win over this mass of Zionists." A mirrored version of this approach was documented among nominal supporters. In 1946, Naty Terdiman, the CDE man in Fălciu, reported that Jews were only pretending to endorse the Committee, out of prudence. According to Terdiman, Jews generally viewed the CDE leadership as fully assimilated quasi-Gentiles.

The CDE was directly involved in efforts to curb the illegal transit of Jews into Mandatory Palestine. In May 1946, it nearly convinced Romanian Communist potentate Ana Pauker to arrest in Constanța's harbor the ship Smirni, which was fitted to carry away Zionist emigrants. During those weeks, the Siguranța began keeping files on all Zionist leaders, while Romanian Police opened fire on Zionist protesters at Iași. Directing its own relief efforts for the returning deportees to Transnistria, the CDE also took charge of instilling in them left-wing ideals. In early 1946, the local section of Caraș reported on having marginalised "reactionary and subversive elements" who had attempted to win refugees over to their cause. CDE branches in Northern Transylvania gave direct support to Jews seeking to reach Palestine by fleeing to the West, but also complained that such emigrations were chaotic and dangerous. From August 1946, the CDE's propaganda described Zionist camps for displaced persons as miserable, and journey to Palestine as not worth the risk. Instead, it gave positive reviews to life in the Jewish Autonomous Oblast.

=== Early causes ===
Some CDE chapters by then demanding the full restitution of assets confiscated in the Holocaust, addressing Groza a memorandum on the matter. In response to such calls, Groza insisted that "the Jews cannot ask for privileges just because they are Jews", disseminating rumors that most Jews were speculators, and asking for left-wingers among them to concentrate on combating their "outrageous lifestyle". The CDE was successful in obtaining other concessions, such as the exemption of former concentration camp inmates from service in the Romanian Army or steps to release Jewish inmates from the Red Army's captivity. While the despoliation question remained unresolved, CDE cadres were also involved in responding to antisemitic violence, as well as in denouncing alleged Holocaust perpetrators, including football coach Ferenc Rónai and teacher Sava Dumitru. They made efforts to collect data about specific pogroms, including one in Vișeu de Sus, and staged a burial ceremony for soap bars assumed to be made from human fat. However, Kohn's CPED, integrated as a CDE section in 1946, also championed reconciliation with the Hungarian community. At a MADOSZ rally in 1946, Kohn spoke of the special cultural connection between the two communities—as noted by historian Attila Gidó, his speech featured a relativisation of the Holocaust in Hungary.

Other activists gave their own replies on the issue of Hungarian responsibility for the Holocaust. László Erdős, leader of the CDE's Cluj section, refused to promise protection to Calvinist and Unitarian clergy, implying that both had been complicit in Holocaust crimes. CDE operative Otto Rappaport also spoke on the issue, but insisted that MADOSZ and other local Hungarians "openly and firmly judge the crimes of an era and generation." While advocating the liquidation of Hungarian fascism, Rappaport contended: "Jewry does not identify and does not generalize the traitors of the Hungarian people with the Hungarian democrats. The Jewry equally hates the Hungarian and Romanian reaction". Despite Kohn's attempts at finding common ground, MADOSZ and the CDE were at odds over issues such as the return of Jewish property in Bistrița County.

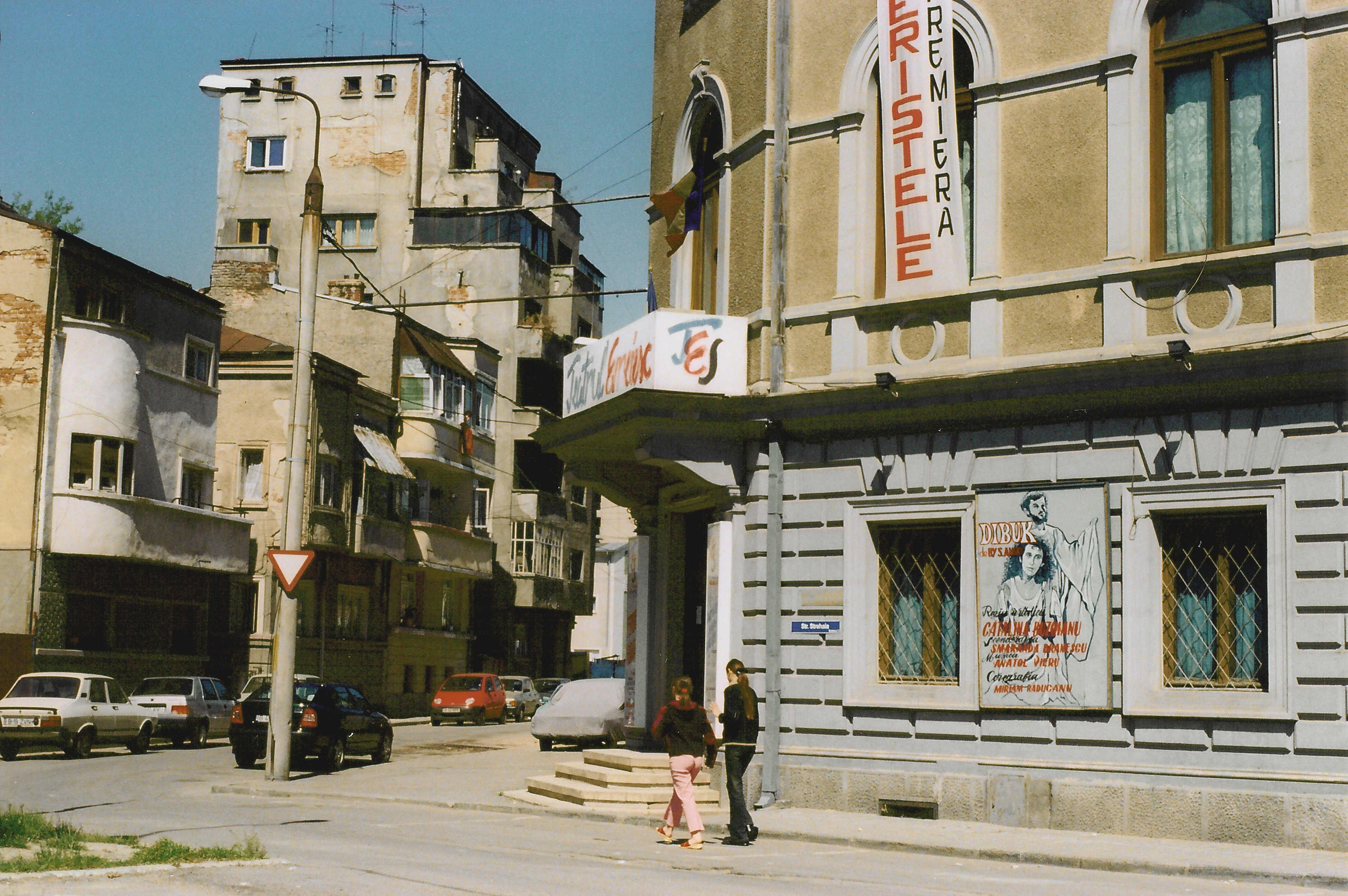
Exterior of the Barașeum (2002 photograph)

Shunning the Hebrew revival encouraged by Zionism, the CDE had as its central mouthpiece a Romanian-language weekly, Unirea, first published in November 1945. Its name ("unity" or "unification") was selected to contradict Luca's notions of class conflict. At an early stage, the newspaper's general line was that Zionism was only justified in Western countries, as a reaction to antisemitism. It viewed itself as heir to "Jewry's democratic traditions", while also endorsing a "combat of the entire Romanian people for democracy, restoration, and prosperity." In practice, it circulated PCR propaganda, some of which was penned by Sașa Pană, formerly an avant-garde author. The chief editor was Anton Celaru, a distinguished translator from Yiddish. From 1947, the CDE also put out a Yiddish literary review, Yikuf Bletter, and, for a while in 1948, printed a Hungarian–Romanian bulletin. The Cluj newspaper Egység, later known as Új Út, was also published by the CDE. According to Zeev-Herșcovici, the CDE was only successful in promoting socialist Yiddishism through its network of schools, including obtaining a Yiddish state curriculum; the Barașeum was maintained as a state theater, to promote Yiddish drama. Yiddishist campaigns were partly supervised by Polia Barasch, who was an inspector for the Ministry of Education, as well as serving as leader of the CDE Female Section. The latter was strong at Arad and elsewhere in the Banat, where schoolgirl Hedi Schauer was also leader of the FTDE.

The CDE had as its stated objective the suppression of religious and cultural Judaism; Yiddish culture was tolerated as a brand of Jewish secularism. Thus, Egység's agenda was "to eliminate cooperation between the Jewish population on the one hand, and the religious communities and bourgeois forces on the other." In this, the Committee earned backing from Rabbi Meyer Abraham Halevy, who declared that, with the onset of Soviet occupation, the synagogue had a duty to become "red"; on this basis, the CDE endorsed a direct supervision of all synagogues by the FCER. As early as February 1946, CDE activists convened a meeting of 1,266 shochtim, instructing them to perform their duties with "democratic spirit", heeding the "revolutionary changes". Orthodox Judaism was identified as a specific target in Maramureș County, where rabbis clashed with CDE men over the distribution of aid obtained from The Joint. These congregations were most active in resisting anti-Zionist propaganda as pressed through the synagogues. In practice, CDE local branches were still open to Orthodox Jews: at least 3 out of 9 CDE leaders in Bihor County were members or benefactors of the Orthodox community.

=== Electoral campaigns ===
Speaking for the UER's anti-communist mainstream, Wilhelm Filderman described the Committee as a "conveyor belt" of the PCR. By June 1946, the CDE itself was openly acknowledging having been created as a "PCR initiative", further explaining itself as a Jewish "united front" against antisemitism. Following negotiations headlined by Maxy, a CDE national congress on 30 June resolved to support the PCR-dominated Bloc of Democratic Parties (BPD) for the November elections. The message to rally all Jews into the BPD was carried during a 6 July meeting at the Great Synagogue in Iași, through CDE delegates Zelțer-Sărățeanu and Marcel Dulbergher. CDE cadres, and in particular Barasch's Female Section, were involved in the effort to re-register Jewish voters, whom they also instructed to vote for the BPD. CDE propaganda argued that electing BPD candidates was a sure way to extinguish the "slavery of yesteryear".

During October, the CDE and the UER convinced the PER to participate alongside them on a Jewish Representation list, which also offered backing to the Bloc. Of three seats reserved for it in the Assembly of Deputies, the alliance took two, held by Eduard Manolescu and Anghel Dascălu; Bernard Rohrlich of the PER was a losing candidate. Historian Petre Țurlea identifies both elected deputies as CDE candidates, rather than more generic Jewish representatives. In fact, Dascălu represented Mishmar. From December, he pressed government for a reparations bill in favour of Holocaust victims, while also expressing hopes that emigration to Palestine would carry on unhindered. His colleague Manolescu focused his parliamentary speeches on revisiting the Iași pogrom of 1941, urging for a more thorough prosecution of culprits.

Loyalty to the government program was again stated on 2 December 1946, codified into a joint statement by the CDE, MADOSZ, and left-wing organisations representing Armenians, Bulgarians, and Greeks. In the aftermath, CDE propaganda gave full endorsement to Groza's discretionary measures—including a stabilisation of the Romanian leu which, in reality, acted as a major depressor on Jewish economic life. By May 1947, the party was issuing new reprimands against Jews seeking to emigrate, instructing them to "integrate with the productive process and the effort to rebuild Romania". It also called on those who could not be persuaded to assimilate to only emigrate if and when they received permission from the Romanian state. A month after, the CDE in Satu Mare asked for approval to run its own "reconstruction camp" in cooperation with the Zionists.

During late 1947, the national CDE took over control over Jewish emigration, which included attempts to reeducate all applicants by presenting communist alternatives. As CDE leader in Hunedoara County, Béla Ringler saluted the United Nations Partition Plan for Palestine, with its provisions for a Jewish State, implying that this was a result of Soviet intercession. According to Ringler, the Soviet Union was defended "the rights of peoples big and small, who has rescued the world and among them [sic] the Jewish people from complete annihilation under fascist domination". At this stage, the PCR was viewing immigration as a potential asset, since an indoctrinated Romanian Jewish colony could bring Palestine, and subsequently Israel, into the Eastern bloc, ensuring that government was formed by the Hebrew Communists. The secret plan was picked up on by the general public, and universally ridiculed: "A widely circulated anecdote had the emigrating Jews throwing their party cards overboard once the ship left [its] Romanian port".

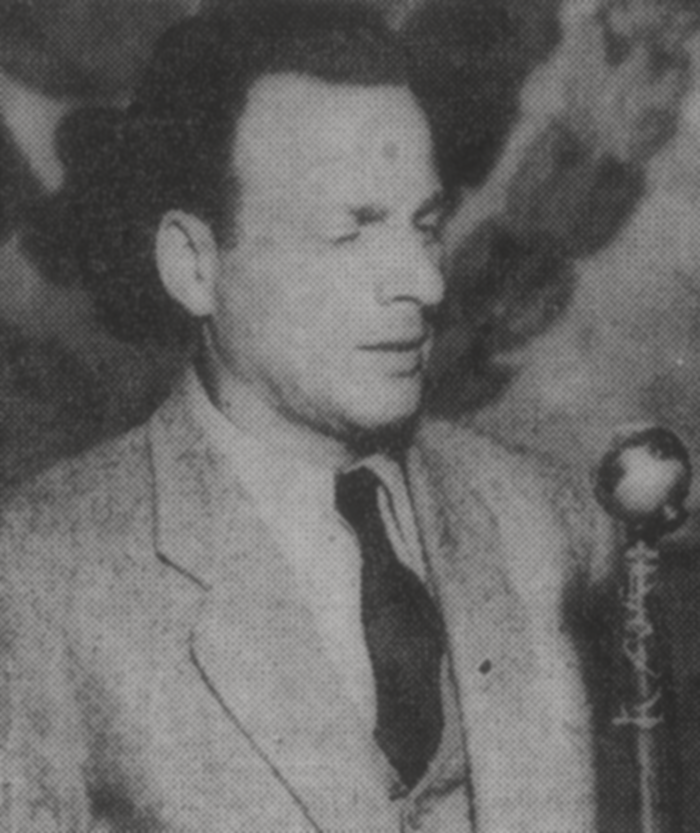
Bercu Feldman in May 1948, at a communist-led rally in support of the Israeli Declaration of Independence

A final meeting of CDE, PER and UER delegates had been convened in July, but failed to produce any results. By 1948, the UER's communisation had been effected by Zelțer-Sărățeanu, who presided over a takeover of the more traditional group, expelling Filderman. In late 1947, 800 CDE members in Severin County addressed an open letter to the Big Four, endorsing a ban on the National Peasants' Party and the National Liberal Party, claiming that both had perpetuated antisemitism. Political life was more heavily restricted from early 1948, with the imposition of a Romanian communist state. In the March 1948 elections the CDE ran as part of the People's Democratic Front (FDP). The adherence to its platform was registered on 27 February, being signed by Paul Iscovici, then-chairman of the CDE. Ihud was a proxy ally, sending representatives on the CDE Electoral Commission. Within the new legislature, the FDP had 405 of a total 414 seats; five of these went to the CDE. They were taken by Feldman, Leibovici-Șerban, Manolescu, Popper, and Marcel Fischler. Manolescu was to die without carrying through his term, in mid-to-late 1949.

Groza's regime believed that it could seal Jewish support when, in early 1948, it issued a decree transferring Jewish heirless properties, confiscated during the Holocaust, to the FCER. Some tension still subsisted between the CDE and its allies, over the unresolved issue of Holocaust confiscations; the CDE section of Bihor also protested over the under-representation of Northern Transylvanian Jews in the Assembly of Deputies. The Committee maintained an international profile during its last years, with delegates attending the 1948 World Jewish Congress in Montreux. Mișu Benvenisti of the PER was also invited, sharing the stage with Feldman, Bacalu, and Leibovici-Șerban. The latter expressed Jewish Romanian sympathy toward Israeli independence, supporting an alliance between the new state and the Soviet Union. Filderman was also present as a regular member of the audience, and looked on as Feldman made "great gestures of friendship" toward Nahum Goldmann, who was thus convinced that collaboration could still exist between Jewish and Soviet groups. In its coverage of the war in Palestine, the PCR press spoke of the "savage aggression by the Arab states against the Jewish people in Palestine", and alleged that it was being propped up by "Anglo-American imperialism".

By then, however, the Romanian communist leadership had switched their support to the Arab Liberation Army. On 11 June 1948, exactly as Romania gave formal recognition to Israel, all Zionist organisations were ordered to shut down. On 16 June the organisation elected Moses Rosen as the Chief Rabbi of Romania to replace Alexandru Șafran. Șafran, who had defected the previous December, argued that the CDE was behind his ouster, since he had refused to sign a document calling for the execution of anti-communist leader Iuliu Maniu. As he recalled, he left the country before he could be framed by the Committee leadership. Elsewhere, Șafran noted that his departure had been hastened by CDE envoy Sandu Lieblich, while another emissary had asked that he sign papers to show that he left willingly. Before the takeover, Popper published a piece which alleged that Șafran was an illegal defector. Upon taking over, Rosen was also awarded a seat on the CDE's presidium; Popper was at the time the FCER President, replaced by Bacalu in 1950.

=== Labour Zionist schism ===
As these events unfolded, the CDE carried out a census of runaway Bukovina Jews living on Romanian territory, noting that most of them were using up Committee resources while preparing their escape to Israel. The CDE branch in Lugoj, meanwhile, carried out an investigation and purge of "racketeers" (speculanți) from party ranks, and become more appealing to proletarian Jews. In October 1948, the regime's official newspaper, Scînteia, issued directions for CDE to circulate Ilya Ehrenburg's critique of Israel among its members and sympathisers; this message pushed the CDE into open conflict with the Zionists, resulting in a series of street battles between the two camps. On 12 December, the same publication more openly alleged that a Zionist conspiracy was subverting the CDE from within. Before the end of the month, the Committee acquiesced to the formal designation of Zionism as a variety of fascism or "reactionary nationalism", and proceeded to exclude from its ranks all remaining Zionists (in practice, all non-communists).

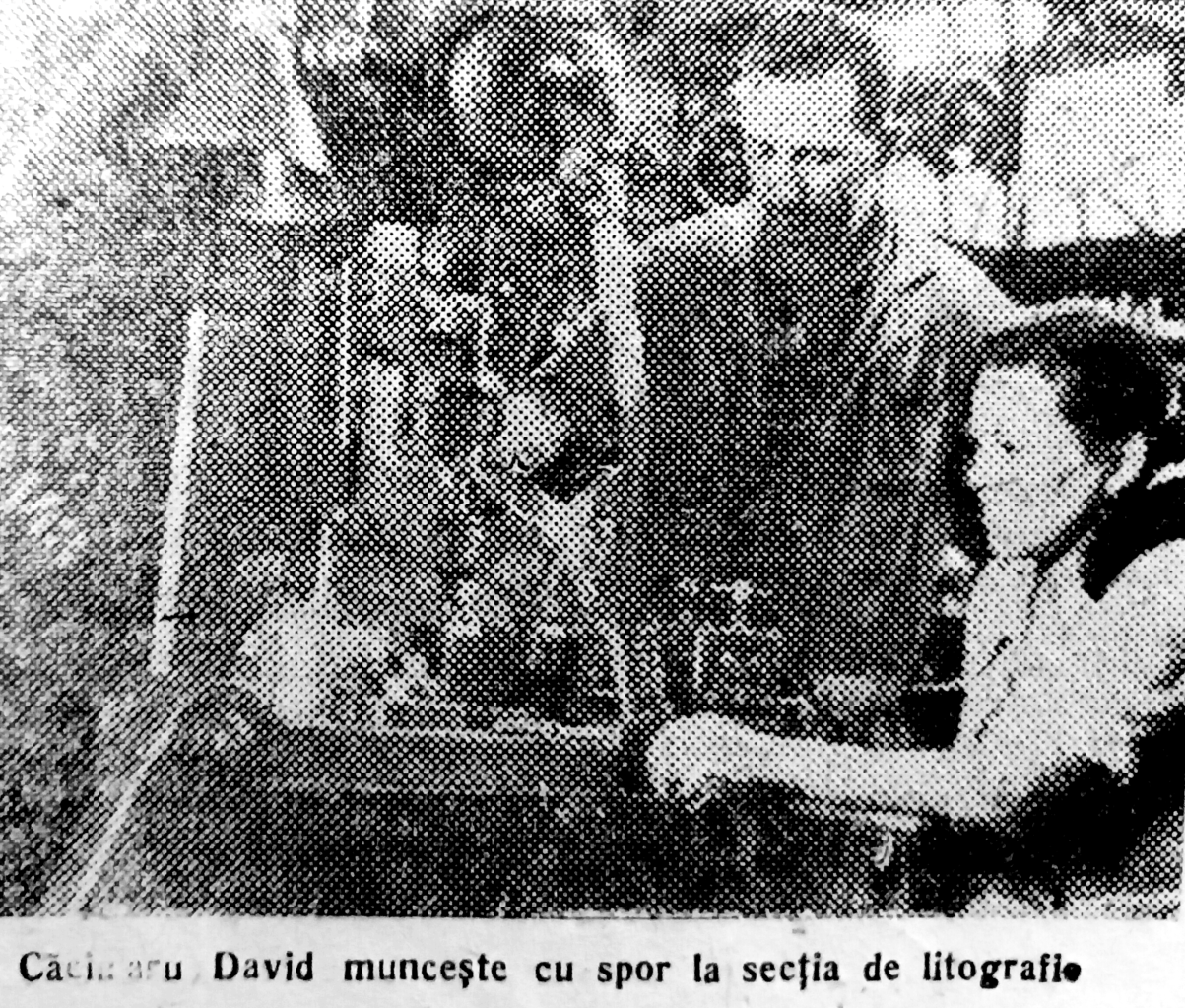
Unirea photograph showing Căciularu David, an "unproductive Jew", after his retraining and employment at Metaloglobus factory (September 1948)

Over the following months, Mishmar withdrew from the CDE and created an international alliance with a new socialist group, the Mapam; Dascălu became head of the local Mapam chapter. The CDE, and in particular the FTDE, made efforts to bring them back into the fold, referring to them as "our Mishmar friends". The Committee also showcased its contacts with the Israeli Communist Party, inviting its Secretary Eliyahu Gojansky on a tour of Romania in mid 1948. Also then, a Siguranța informant reported that Jews were widely dissatisfied with the CDE, with a "rather significant current" describing it as purely adverse to Jewish interests. Its agents were looking into the activities of a CDE secretary, Ernst Fischer, whom they had exposed as a proxy for Revisionist Zionism.

In October, Luca and Chivu Stoica reiterated that Zionism had been purged from the CDE, which was now destined to "attracting the Jewish masses" into the Workers' Party (PMR, as the PCR had been renamed after absorbing the PSDR). Following their intervention, PMR General Secretary Gheorghe Gheorghiu-Dej issued a final order to liquidate all remnants of Jewish nationalism. The resolution codifying this was drafted in December by a collective of authors, including Feldman, Ladislau Bányai, Alexandru Moghioroș, Leonte Răutu, and Miron Constantinescu. It remained largely silent on whether Jews were still to be considered a distinct ethnic community, but explicitly included a mandate for the CDE to stamp out Zionism. The authors condemned "certain Party members within the CDE" for still tolerating the "nationalist current", and promised to "reconstruct the CDE from progressive elements". Historian Ovidiu Bozgan notes that, upon the end of this meeting, the CDE emerged as the "privileged instrument" for dismantling the Zionist presence in Romania.

A return to officially sanctioned anti-Zionist violence was made in November 1948, when Police raided the Jewish National Fund, detaining its leader Leon Itzcar on charges of contraband; this campaign was fully endorsed by Unirea, who referred to Zionists as "blackmarketeers" and "disrupters of the socialist economy". During December, as noted by French diplomat Philippe de Luze, the standoff produced "very violent incidents". CDE squads stormed into the Bucharest offices of the ten remaining Zionist organisations, including Mishmar, Ihud, Bnei Akiva, and HaOved HaTzioni. The latter two in particular mounted resistance, with publicised incidents which prompted communist authorities order a truce. At least seven offices had been returned to Zionist ownership by 6 December. In the aftermath, PCR internal documents criticised the CDE for being "hamfisted".

In January 1949, Feldman took over as CDE Chairman, presiding over the CDE's full communisation. By March, the CDE leadership bureaus had been restructured entirely, which, as noted by historian Hary Kuller, also meant it reached a "paroxysm of anti-Zionist action". Within weeks, CDE leaders in Constanța, Galați and Timișoara had been replaced, accused of having failed to respond in kind to the Zionist threat. Jewish community leader Aurel Vainer, who was at the time a young Zionist, recalls that a late transport of "extremely pro-communist Jews" left Constanța during those weeks. According to Vainer, the ships had come for him and other non-communists, but were commandeered by the CDE and the authorities "took us back to our homes." De Luze similarly records rumors that a Panamanian-flagged ship was transporting 2,500 communist Jews as would-be voters in the Israeli legislative election.

On 18 April, Feldman ceded the CDE chairmanship to Barbu Lăzăreanu, though retaining the post of General Secretary, with other positions on the board going to Bacalu, Iscovici, Leibovici-Șerban, Paul Davidovici, Betty Goldstein, Ștefan Solomon, and Iacob Wechsler. Also that month, the FTDE was disbanded, as the Workers' Party Youth was established, signaling that the Jewish community "[had been] given over completely to the dominance of the government alone". In June, CDE supervisors at the Barașeum began issuing criticism of the troupe, noting that only 4 of 110 staff members had bothered to obtain PMR membership, and that the ideological plays remained opaque. Communist control through the CDE proxy was also highlighted by the rabbinical congress of July, during which Ashkenazi and Sephardi communities pledged themselves to supporting the Committee. However, the CDE stance had alienated Rabbi Rosen, who began working in secret against the regime; decades later, described the CDE as an Yevsektsiya engaged in "terroriz[ing] the Jewish communities".

=== Against Israel ===
The CDE was still a proponent of anti-Zionism following the consolidation of an independent Israel. By mid 1949, Mapam and all other socialist Zionist groups decided to cease official activities. Feldman warned his followers that this was a ruse, since "the enemies of the working class never give up their positions of their own free will." Throughout that year, Unirea incited renewed campaigns against Zionist influence, and condemned any "slacking". It announced proudly that, as a result of its campaigning, "war-mongers who happen to be the bosses of Zionist nationalists" refrained from attending a ceremony honoring victims of the 1941 pogrom. Its issues included facsimiles of letters by distraught emigrants, who wrote back to report that Israel was an insecure and imperialistic nation, as well as a communique by Borochovia, announcing that it had ceased supporting Zionist emigration.

That message was communicated through the party branches, with activist Meier Froimovici declaring that "there is no longer a Jewish Question in Romania", and equating the Zionist underground with human traffickers. This thesis was furthered by CDE activists designated as lămuritori ("educators"), who drew comparisons between hasty emigration and wartime deportations to Transnistria, in that they divided families. Egység suggested to its readers that "anyone seeking to emigrate would be committing suicide", and that Zionism was a "twin brother of anti-Semitism". Anti-communist observers in the Romanian diaspora began speculating that the communist leadership was preparing to implicate the Zionists in a localized version of the László Rajk trial.

During January 1949, the CDE still honored an agreement with Israel, allowing 1,300 Jews to sail out of Romania. This was followed by a severe clampdown in February, reducing the number to 160 a month, most of whom were not in fact Romanian citizens; the Romanian government intervened to relax pressures during November. As noted by researcher Raphael Vago, this positioning reflected a convergence of two attitudes. Among the Jewish communists, Ana Pauker pleaded with her colleagues to "let my people go"; other PCR leaders, "backed by anti-Semites, were glad to get rid of the Jews and to inherit their jobs, apartments and belongings." At the time, a PMR resolution initiated by Teohari Georgescu encouraged hostile Jews to leave. As Gheorghiu-Dej put it during the session, "we have no reason to keep in the bourgeoisie."

While serving as Minister of Foreign Affairs, Pauker never explicitly endorsed emigration and repeatedly snubbed Reuven Rubin, the Israeli Ambassador. However, rumors and signals of support produced spontaneous rallies of Jews in front of the Israeli embassy in Bucharest, with the crowd "shout[ing] for emigration papers". Feldman decried the protest as a "provocation" by Israel. After self-analysis sessions organised by Constantinescu, the CDE concluded that Romanian Jews had misread the PMR's approval of selective emigration as an invitation; it promised to channel its efforts on depicting Israel as a capitalist country of "ever-increasing poverty and squalor". In July 1949, Unirea put out an appeal to the workers, outlining reasons why they should not take in Zionist ideology. In October, CDE militants, including Feldman and Laurențiu Bercovici, gave speeches condemning David Ben-Gurion, Israel's Head of Government and noted Labour Zionist, for having moved away from Soviet influence. Feldman himself referred to the Mapai as "right-wing socialists". The message was expanded upon in Isac Ludo's book, Scrisoare domnului Ben Gurion ("Letter to Mr Ben Gurion"), published by the CDE in 1950. Ludo, who was reputedly blackmailed by the PCR over his Zionist past, decried Israel as obeying American interests.

Vago describes the clash of vision between the CDE and the PMR as an "impossible situation", also noting that Pauker switched to backing the former, and recommending breaks on emigration. For a while in early 1950, the Committee readjusted its propaganda themes, claiming that as many as 80% of emigrants, including most Bukovinian Jews, "will not be a great loss". In such reports, settlers appeared as destitute and promiscuous gamblers. This stance was contradicted by a CDE communique of 25 March 1950. It decried the "very loose criteria" for emigration, complaining that Jewish workers were allowed to flee a people's democracy for a "capitalist country, with its unemployment and misery." In April 1950, as FCER secretary, Leibovici-Șerban issued a staunch warning accusing would-be emigrants of parasitism, and advising them to seek employment in Romania. The CDE was at the time claiming that 18,000 Jews had been integrated professionally in 1949 alone, all as a result of its programs. An Israeli diplomat identified as Ghilade responded with an opinion piece in Maariv, asserting that CDE "traitors", which he estimated as 20,000 individuals, were no match for the 300,000 Zionists still active in Romania.

=== Final purge ===
By May 1949, the regime had arrested as many as 7,500 Zionists, including Benvenisti and some 50 other prominent militants. At that stage, the UER voted to dissolve itself, on the pretext that "racial hatred" no longer existed in communised Romania. In October, Mordechai Oren, a member of the Mapam leadership in Israel, visited Feldman and attempted to obtain his support for the release of Zionist prisoners. Feldman declared himself against this move, noting that the Zionists had been charged with spying. By contrast, Rosen, Halevy and Leibovici-Șerban made efforts to obtain the release of Zionist rabbi Eliezer Zusia Portugal, whom they depicted as a defender of democratic values.

Finally, the CDE itself was targeted by communist purges, with six of its board members being pushed to resign, for "laxity", during a party conference in March 1950. The conference also designated 1950 as a year of combat against Zionism, announcing that it would investigate Jewish fiction writers for their toleration of nationalist themes. At that stage, the CDE was directly implicated in communist censorship, purging its own libraries of literature deemed unsuitable. At Huși, 400 books had been "purged" by July 1949. It also published a list of Zionist and Bundistn writers whose work could no longer be read by Romanian Jews. Examples included Isaac Mayer Dick, H. Leivick, and David Pinski; Romanian Yiddishists Iacob Ashel Groper and Wolf Tambur were castigated for not popularising communist tenets in their Holocaust-themed writings. David Bergelson proved a more contentious case: while the Barașeum dropped his plays, the YIKUF still popularised his "progressive" works. Leon Bertiș had his verse published in Yikuf Bletter, but, as a staunch Zionist, could not be convinced to join the CDE.

"Unmasking" sessions by provincial chapters led to the public humiliation of various Jewish notables, including industrialist Solomon Israel, retailer Ștefan Fekete, and Marc Ludovic, who was the CDE's own secretary in Târgu Mureș. A similar investigation of Barașeum actors found more ideological flaws, including Zionism, but failed to name any perpetrators. Historian Corina L. Petrescu suggests that such apparent protection was extended to them because of cultural priorities: "[activists] had to strike a balance between [the troupe's] state-assigned role as poster child of the regime and its self-assigned task as torchbearer for high quality Yiddish culture." By 1950, the CDE took its "unmasking" sessions into factories, encouraging workers to shame those of their colleagues who had submitted emigration papers, and insisting for Zionists to be stripped of their wages.

As noted by Kuller, the impact of such practices on the Jewish psyche was "null", especially since emigration continued to be tolerated to 1952. Vago reports that "the dull evening courses teaching Jews the elements of 'class struggle' and of the need to change Jewish class structure [are] remembered [collectively] with a bitterness about losing the small businesses". Academic Zoltán Tibori Szabó similarly notes that the CDE's propaganda campaign against Zionism "misfired and it only contributed to convincing more Jews they should get out as soon as possible." The regime was much embarrassed when, in May 1950, the CDE's top echelons in Suceava County submitted requests for emigration, and again in September, when Zelțer-Sărățeanu was booed by Unirea Sfântă congregants for speaking out against emigration. Northern Transylvanian cities also experienced the mass emigration of CDE members, including all the party hierarchy in Năsăud.

Communist supervisors noted their displeasure, indicating that the CDE's "instructional work" was still "not deep enough". Unirea was closed down in 1951 and Yikuf Bletter in 1952; a new publication, Viața Nouă was in print from 1951 to 1953. Between these dates, a full purge of the CDE had been carried out: "all energies were devoted to the frenzy of uncovering the 'internal enemy'." According to historian Stefano Bottoni, it marked "the first visible sign of a failed compromise, whose bases — namely, that party members were to drop their 'strong' Jewish identity, while the petty and middle bourgeoisie were to be economically ruined — had been proven as unacceptable for a majority of Jews in Romania."

=== Dissolution and aftermath ===
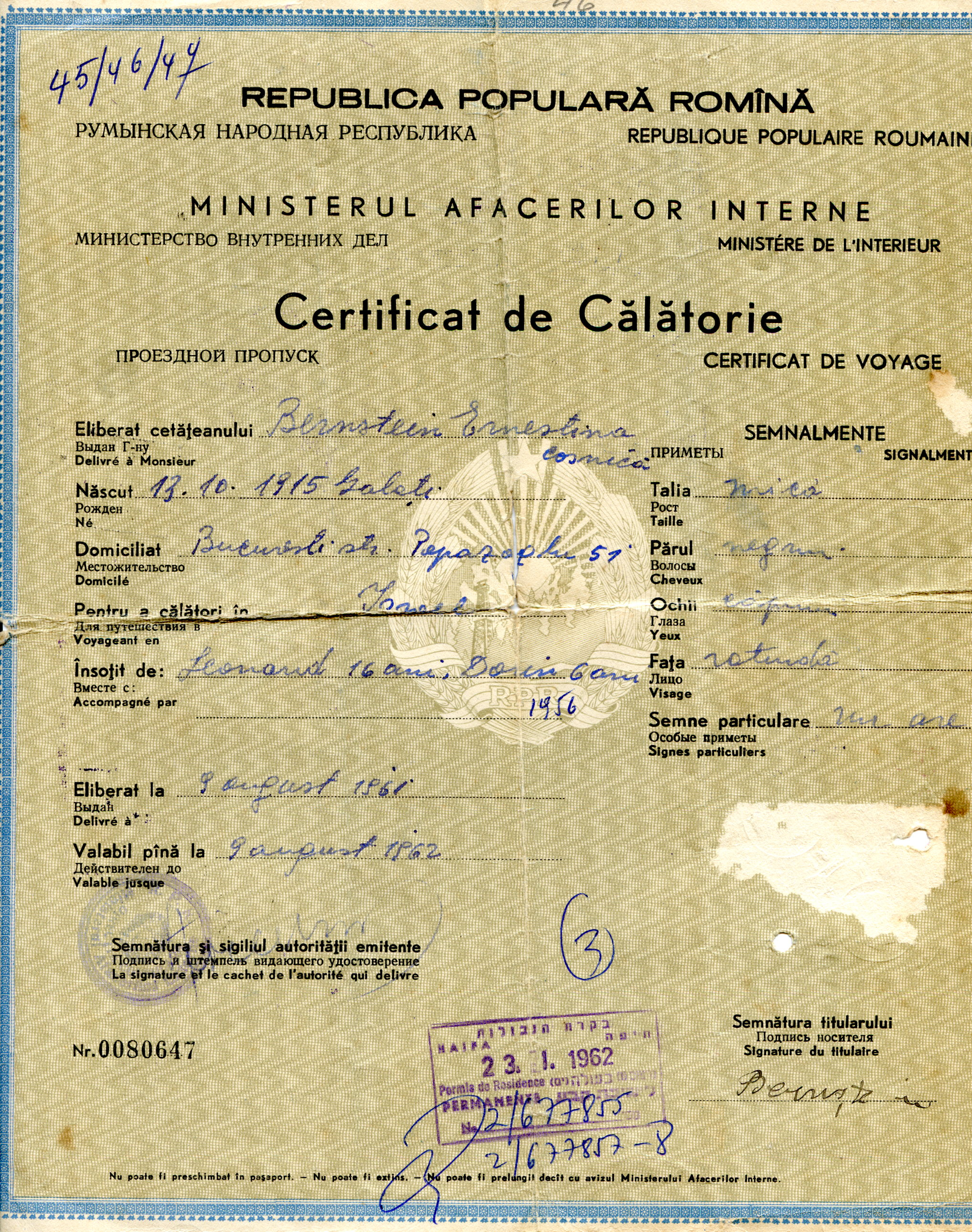
A laissez-passer issued for a Romanian Jewish emigrant to Israel, 1961

At the height of this realignment, Feldman redefined the CDE as primarily destined for turning Jews into admirers of the Soviet Union and supporters of its "combat for peace". As argued by Gidó, its mission had been "confined to the dissemination of communist propaganda and of the communist social regime." The PMR had by then shelved all plans of communising Israel, blaming their failure on Pauker, who was now sidelined and prosecuted. In February 1953, as the Soviet Union announced that it was prosecuting a Jewish conspiracy—the so-called "Doctors' plot"—angry Zionists staged an attack on the Soviet embassy in Tel Aviv. Viața Nouă responded to these events by adhering to the Soviet narrative: "Honest Jews the world over are infuriated by these deeds of the Jewish bourgeois nationalists and imperialist aggressors, who seek to expand their range through Zionist organisations."

The CDE voted to dissolve itself (but was in practice liquidated) on 16 March of that year, when it issued a final notice declaring that "all issues which confounded the Jewish population are presently resolved". A note by the Soviet diplomat N. P. Sulitsky suggests that the act was forced upon the Jewish community by Gheorghiu-Dej, who still regarded the CDE itself as a hub for "Jewish bourgeois nationalists". Pauker was arrested the same day as part of an investigation into the "rootless cosmopolitan" affair, which later engulfed and threatened some of the CDE's former leaders. July 1953 witnessed the first wave of show trials against the Zionist centres, extending, from 1954, to the PER leadership, and lasting to 1959. Arrested in the 1950 roundups, Ihud's Loewenstein-Lavi was sentenced to a 10-year term in jail, for sedition, but paroled in 1955. Prosecution was closely supervised by the PMR leadership, with Gheorghiu-Dej suggesting "two to three death sentences in each anti-Jewish trial". This radicalism was mitigated in practice by legal professionals, including the CDE's Dadu Rosenkranz, who obtained a reduction of penalties for the "Prisoners of Zion" (Asirei Zion).

As reported by lawyer-memoirist Petre Pandrea, Leibovici-Șerban turned on Sandu Lieblich using "hooligan" methods. This resulted in Lieblich's arrest, with his adversary emerging as the "uncrowned king of his religious group." From 1946, CDE co-founder Șraier had held a government position, serving as Deputy Minister at Internal Affairs. Exposed as a spy for the old regime, he had clandestinely left Romania in 1952. The Interior Minister, Teohari Georgescu, was arrested for various crimes in 1954. As part of his interrogation, he confessed to having obtained sexual favors from several women—including Blanka Pecherman, who wanted his approval to leave for Israel. At around the same time, Maxy was being investigated for his work at the Artists' Union. He had been accused of nepotism, incompetence, and lack of commitment to socialist realism. Kohn, who had maintained contacts with disgraced MADOSZ leader Gyárfás Kurkó after 1949, was protected from arrest by his friendship with Groza and Constantinescu.

During subsequent years, former CDE cadres continued to defend the PMR party line. In 1954, Bacalu and Rosen circulated a letter signed by 37 Romanian rabbis, responding to allegations in The Jewish Western Bulletin that freedom of worship had been curtailed by Gheorghiu-Dej. Feldman's 1955 interview in Kol HaAm featured claims that the "Marxist-Leninist spirit" had solved all of Romania's minority issues. Feldman rejected the need for a Yiddish press, since all Jews were supposedly literate in Romanian, while informing readers that education in Yiddish was continuing as before. In reality, the regime was clamping down on the use of Yiddish: though not as repressed as Zionist propaganda, various Yiddishist textbooks were placed under restricted use until the end of communism in 1989.

The communist authorities finally opted not to recognize Jews as a separate ethnicity, but as Romanians professing Judaism; the FCER was allowed to exist as a sole instrument through which the PMR controlled the community. From 1956, its magazine, Revista Cultului Mozaic, partly fulfilled Viața Nouă's role. The project involved Rosen and Bacalu, and was noted for removing all mention of Zionism in their commemoration of the Holocaust. The Federation was only given authority on religious matters—although, from 1964, its leader was an ex-officio deputy in the Great National Assembly. Rumors about the normalisation of Israel–Romania relations spread quickly in 1958, leading 100,000 Romanian Jews to apply for emigration. Such revelations about the still-massive popularity of Zionism in Romania prompted the PMR to purge its own ranks of Jews, leading to the effective introduction of a Jewish quota among card-carrying communists. No Yiddish books were published in Romania in 1961, though Yiddish theaters continued to be active, and were reputedly flourishing; meanwhile, the anti-Zionist campaign had been toned down.

The advent of national communism during the late 1950s presented former CDE leaders with the option of rediscovering Zionism or complying with full assimilation. The former path was taken by Emil Dorian with essays he was working on at the time of his death. During the early 1960s, Revista Cultului Mozaic settled on a version of Jewish identitarianism which also promoted the notion of loyalty to the Romanian state. Rabbi Rosen continued to head the community, but also acted as a Zionist dissident. He had founded 19 illegal Talmud Torahs at the height of repression, and, during the 1960s liberalisation, managed to obtain approval for the departure of many other Jews. This also witnessed more of the former CDE activists leaving, as was the case with Loewenstein-Lavi in 1957, and with Rosenkranz in 1961. Rosen took pride in noting that, by 1985, about 96% of Romanian Jews had settled in Israel.
