= 1961 Romanian parliamentary election =

- 5 March 1961

All 465 seats in the Great National Assembly
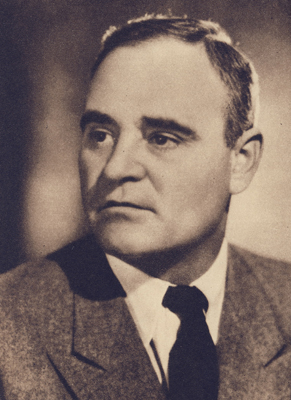
	First party
Leader	Gheorghe Gheorghiu-Dej
Party	PMR
Alliance	FDP
Seats won	465
Seat change	▲28
Popular vote	12,388,787
Percentage	99.81%
Prime Minister before election
Chivu Stoica
PMR
Elected Prime Minister
Ion Gheorghe Maurer
PMR

Parliamentary elections were held in Romania on 5 March 1961. Voters were presented with a single list from the People's Democratic Front (FDP), which was dominated by the Romanian Workers Party (PMR). The Front won all 465 seats in the Great National Assembly.

== Electoral system ==
Candidates were elected in single member constituencies, and had to receive over 50% of the vote. If no candidate passed this threshold, or if voter turnout in the constituency was less than 50%, re-runs were held until the requirements were met. Candidates could be nominated by the FDP or mass organisations, although the latter were monitored by the Front. Voters had the option of voting against the Front candidates.

== Results ==
Graph of the party split among 465 seats.
Party	Votes	%	Seats
People's Democratic Front	12,388,787	99.81	465
Against	23,461	0.19	–
Total	12,412,248	100.00	465
Valid votes	12,412,248	99.96	
Invalid/blank votes	5,552	0.04	
Total votes	12,417,800	100.00	
Registered voters/turnout	12,444,977	99.78	
Source: Nohlen & Stöver
