= 1957 Romanian parliamentary election =

- 3 February 1957

All 437 seats in the Great National Assembly
- Turnout: 99.15%
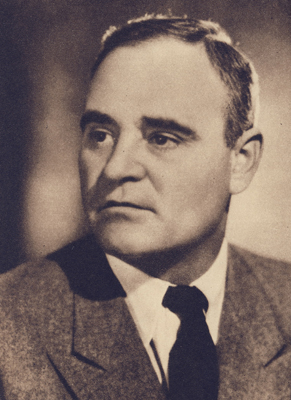
	First party
Leader	Gheorghe Gheorghiu-Dej
Party	PMR
Alliance	FDP
Seats won	437
Seat change	▲9
Popular vote	11,652,289
Percentage	99.00%
Swing	▼1.00pp
Prime Minister before election
Chivu Stoica
PMR
Elected Prime Minister
Chivu Stoica
PMR

Parliamentary elections were held in Romania on 3 February 1957. Voters were presented with a single slate of candidates from the People's Democratic Front (FDP), which was dominated by the Romanian Workers Party (PMR). The Front won all 437 seats in the Great National Assembly.

== Electoral system ==
Candidates were elected in single member constituencies, and had to receive over 50% of the vote. If no candidate passed this threshold, or if voter turnout in the constituency was less than 50%, re-runs were held until the requirements were met. Candidates could be nominated by the FDP or mass organisations, although the latter were monitored by the Front. Voters had the option of voting against the Front candidates.

== Results ==
Graph of the party split among 437 seats.
Party	Votes	%	Seats
People's Democratic Front	11,424,521	99.00	437
Against	115,880	1.00	–
Total	11,540,401	100.00	437
Valid votes	11,540,401	99.88	
Invalid/blank votes	13,289	0.12	
Total votes	11,553,690	100.00	
Registered voters/turnout	11,652,289	99.15	
Source: Nohlen & Stöver
