= People's Democratic Front (Romania) =

People's Democratic Front Frontul Democrației Populare
- Leader: Anton Alexandrescu; Gheorghe Gheorghiu-Dej; Petru Groza; Gyárfás Kurkó; Max Hermann Maxy; Lothar Rădăceanu; Gheorghe Vlădescu-Răcoasa; Ștefan Voitec
- Founded: October 1944 (as National Democratic Front)
- Dissolved: 1968
- Succeeded by: Front of Socialist Unity and Democracy
- Headquarters: Bucharest
- Ideology: Left-wing populism Internal factions: Agrarian socialism Communism; Marxism–Leninism; Stalinism; Social democracy Left-wing nationalism Romanian nationalism Hungarian nationalism Anti-Zionism
- Political position: Centre-left to far-left
- Colours: Blue (customary); Blue, Yellow, Red (Romanian flag)

The People's Democratic Front (Romanian: Frontul Democrației Populare, FDP, Hungarian: Országos Demokrata Arcvonal) was an electoral alliance in Romania from 1944 to 1968, dominated by the Romanian Communist Party (PCR). It formed the government of Romania from 1946 to 1968, and from 1948 onward was effectively the only legal political organization in the country.

== History ==
The alliance was created as the National Democratic Front (Frontul Național Democrat, FND) in October 1944, and was an alliance of the PCR, the Romanian Social Democratic Party (PSDR), the Ploughmen's Front (FP) and other Communist-affiliated organisations. In the fraudulent 1946 elections the front formed the core of the Bloc of Democratic Parties, which officially won 69.8 percent of the vote and 347 of the 414 seats in Parliament, "confirming" the government of pro-Communist Prime Minister Petru Groza in power.

After the collapse of Communism, some authors argued that the opposition National Peasants' Party (PNȚ) would have won a comprehensive victory had the Groza government allowed an honest election. Indeed, the opposition long claimed it would have won as much as 80 percent of the vote had the election been conducted fairly. Later, historian Petre Ţurlea reviewed a confidential Communist Party report about the election that showed the Bloc of Democratic Parties had actually won at most 48 percent of the vote. He concluded that the PNȚ and the opposition parties likely came up well short of the landslide they had long claimed, but they would have still won enough votes between them in an honest election to form a coalition government.

The Communists seized full power in December 1947, when they pushed King Michael to abdicate and used their legislative supermajority to abolish the monarchy and declare Romania a "people's republic". In early 1948, the Social Democrats merged with the Communists to form the Romanian Workers' Party (PMR). At a PMR congress held in February 1948, the FND was converted into the FDP. It quickly took on a character similar to other "national fronts" in the Soviet bloc. The member parties became completely subservient to the PMR and were required to accept the PMR's "leading role" as a condition of their continued existence. However, Groza, the leader of one of those minor parties, the Ploughmen's Front, remained prime minister until 1952, five years after the onset of Communist rule, when he handed the post to PMR leader Gheorghe Gheorghiu-Dej.

In the March 1948 elections, the Front, and through it, the PMR consolidated its grip on the country. The Front won 93.2 percent of the vote and all but nine seats in the legislature, with only rump liberal and peasant parties as opposition. Within the Front, the PMR and its allies won 201 seats (190 for the PMR and 11 for its affiliates), just short of a majority in its own right. This proved to be the last time that opposition parties were allowed to take part in an election during the Communist era, though Romania had effectively been a one-party state since Michael's abdication.

In the elections of 1952, 1957, 1961 and 1965, voters were presented with a single list of FDP candidates. While voters could reject the list or spoil their ballots, few did so; official figures gave the FDP 99 percent or more of the vote on each occasion. In 1968, the FDP was replaced by the Front of Socialist Unity.

== Election results ==
Election	Votes	%	Seats	+/–	Position
1946	4,773,689	69.8	347 / 414	New	1st (Note: Romanian Social Democratic Party 81 seats, National Liberal Party–Tătărescu 75, Ploughmen's Front 70, Romanian Communist Party 68, National Popular Party 26, National Peasants' Party–Alexandrescu 20, and 8 independents affiliated to the PCR.)
1948	6,959,936	93.2	405 / 414	▲58	1st (Note: Romanian Workers Party and affiliates 190 seats, Ploughmen's Front 126, National Popular Party 43, Hungarian People's Union 30, Jewish Democratic Committee 5, and 11 independents affiliated to the PMR.)
1952	10,187,833	100	428 / 428	▲23	1st
1957	11,424,521	99.0	437 / 437	▲9	1st
1961	12,388,787	99.8	465 / 465	▲28	1st
1965	12,834,862	99.9	465 / 465	Steady	1st

== See also ==
- Front of Socialist Unity and Democracy
