= Hungarian People's Union =

Hungarian People's Union Magyar Népi Szövetség Uniunea Populară Maghiară
- Abbreviation: UPM
- Leader: Gyárfás Kurkó; Kacsó Sándor
- Founded: 1934
- Dissolved: 1953
- Split from: Magyar Party
- Newspaper: Népi Egység
- Ideology: Hungarian minority interests Social democracy
- Political position: Left-wing

The Hungarian People's Union (Hungarian: Magyar Népi Szövetség, MNSZ; Romanian: Uniunea Populară Maghiară, UPM) was a left-wing political party active in Romania between 1934 and 1953 that claimed to represent the Hungarian community. Until 1944, it was called the Union of Hungarian Workers of Romania (Hungarian: Magyar Dolgozók Országos Szövetsége or Romanian: Uniunea Oamenilor Muncii Maghiari din România, generally known under its Hungarian-language acronym MADOSZ).

== Establishment ==
In September 1932, a faction of the Magyar Party created a dissident movement around the weekly Cluj publication Falvak Népe ("Lumea satelor" or "The World of the Villages"). In June 1933, this movement coalesced into the Magyar Opposition (Opoziţia Maghiară), whose leadership included members of the Romanian Communist Party (PCR). The Opposition's local committees and the initiative committees of the Hungarian populace, organised around the Cluj magazine Népakarat ("Voinţa poporului" or "The Will of the People") starting in September 1933, turned into committees of the new, legal organisation MADOSZ.

MADOSZ was formally established on August 20, 1934, at Târgu Mureş. The party programme called for defending the peasantry from higher taxes, an end to abuses against grape-growers and loggers, a joint struggle with ethnic Romanian workers for the granting of specific demands, and respect for democratic rights and freedoms. Sándor Szepesi was its president from 1934 to 1937, while Gyárfás Kurkó held the post from 1937 to 1938. Other notable members included Imre Gál, Lajos Mezei, Ion Vincze and László Bányai. From April to November 1934, its official publication was Székelyföldi Néplap ("Gazeta populară din Ținutul Secuiesc" or "Popular Gazette of Székely Land").

MADOSZ found itself under the influence of the PCR. In the fall of 1934, it created action committees to train in rebellion the entire population of the Ghimeş Valley (peasants as well as loggers), an action targeting the Romanian state. It collaborated with organisations supported by the communists, declaring itself against fascism and Miklós Horthy-style revisionism. Like all other political parties extant in Romania, MADOSZ was dissolved on March 30, 1938.

== Post-coup history ==
After the King Michael's Coup of August 23, 1944, numerous followers of Horthy entered MADOSZ. Under the protective shield of democracy, they undertook many destabilising actions, particularly in Transylvania. On October 16, 1944, the Braşov Conference decided to transform MADOSZ into the Hungarian People's Union, which recognised the leading role of the PCR. It obtained 29 seats at the 1946 election. The party supported the governments that held power from March 6, 1945, onwards, focusing on the creation of a privileged situation for the Hungarian minority. It dissolved itself in 1953.

== Electoral history ==
=== Legislative elections ===
Election	Votes	%	Seats	+/–	Position
1946	568,862	8.3	29 / 414	▲29	▲3rd
1948	881,304	12.88	30 / 414	▲1	▼4th
1952	Part of the FDP				
