= Ștefan Voitec =

Romanian journalist and politician (1900–1984)

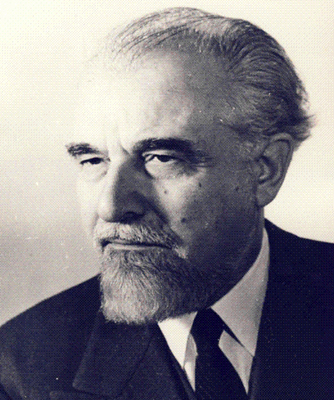
- Voitec in 1967

Member of the Provisional Presidium of the Republic
- In office December 30, 1947 – April 14, 1948
- Preceded by: Michael I (as King of Romania)
- Succeeded by: Constantin Ion Parhon (as President of the Presidium of the Great National Assembly)

President of the State Council
- (Acting)
- In office March 19, 1965 – March 24, 1965 Serving with Gheorghe Maurer and Avram Bunaciu
- Preceded by: Gheorghe Gheorghiu-Dej
- Succeeded by: Chivu Stoica

President of the Great National Assembly
- In office March 20, 1961 – March 28, 1974
- Preceded by: Constantin Pârvulescu
- Succeeded by: Miron Constantinescu
- Constituency: Electroputere

Vice President of the State Council
- In office 1974–1984
- President: Nicolae Ceaușescu
- Preceded by: Miron Constantinescu
- Succeeded by: Maria Ghițulică
- In office 1961–1965
- President: Gheorghe Gheorghiu-Dej
- Preceded by: Office established
- Succeeded by: Constanța Crăciun

Minister of Industry
- In office March 20, 1957 – April 27, 1959
- Prime Minister: Chivu Stoica
- Succeeded by: Alexandru Sencovici

Minister of National Education
- In office November 5, 1944 – December 29, 1947
- Prime Minister: Constantin Sănătescu; Nicolae Rădescu; Petru Groza
- Preceded by: Office established
- Succeeded by: Lothar Rădăceanu

Minister of Internal Trade
- In office October 5, 1955 – November 24, 1956
- Prime Minister: Chivu Stoica
- Preceded by: Mircea Oprișan
- Succeeded by: Marcel Popescu

Personal details
- Born: June 19, 1900 Corabia, Romanați County, Kingdom of Romania
- Died: December 4, 1984 (aged 84) Bucharest, Socialist Republic of Romania
- Party: Social Democratic Party of Romania; Romanian Communist Party
- Other political affiliations: Socialist Party of Romania; Federation of Socialist Parties; Socialist Workers Party of Romania; United Socialist Party
- Spouse: Victoria Voitec
- Children: 1
- Education: University of Bucharest (School of Polytechnics)
- Occupation: Journalist, schoolteacher, researcher, librarian, cooperative manager

Ștefan Voitec (also rendered Ștefan Voitech, Stepan Voitek; June 19, 1900 – December 4, 1984) was a Romanian Marxist journalist and politician who held important positions in the state apparatus of Communist Romania. Debuting as a member of the Socialist Party of Romania in his late teens, he formed the Socialist Workers Party of Romania, then the United Socialist Party, while also engaging in human rights activism and advocating prison reform. The mid-1930s brought him into contact with the Romanian Communist Party, with whom he formed tactical alliances; however, he rejected its political line, and was for a while known as a Trotskyist. In 1939, he joined the consolidated Social Democratic Party, which reunited various socialist groups outlawed by the National Renaissance Front. During World War II, despite ostensibly withdrawing from political life to do research, Voitec served as the party's Secretary and joined the anti-fascist underground. Some reports suggest that he was also a committed anti-communist, critical of the Soviet Union to the point on endorsing war in the East. As a war correspondent, Voitec made contributions to Nazi propaganda, an issue which made him vulnerable to blackmail in later decades.

From June 1944, Voitec played a part in plotting the anti-fascist coup, negotiating a unified platform with communist Lucrețiu Pătrășcanu. Following this regime change, he emerged as a leader of the legalized Social Democrats. In November, he became Minister of Education, serving under increasingly communized governments to December 1947. Himself won over by Marxism-Leninism, Voitec directed a purge of the teaching staff, and engineered his party's alliance with, then absorption by, the Communist Party. Voitec was a member of the unified group's Politburo, and represented Dolj County, then Electroputere factory, in the Great National Assembly; he also served as member of the first republican presidium in 1948, and was briefly the Deputy Prime Minister to Petru Groza. Criticized for his leniency and inconsistencies in applying party dogma, he was sidelined and placed under Securitate surveillance in the early 1950s.

After serving as head of Centrocoop, which grouped Romania's consumers' cooperatives, Voitec returned to the forefront in 1955–1956, when he was reappointed minister, then Deputy Premier. In 1961, Gheorghe Gheorghiu-Dej also included him on the State Council, as Assembly Chairman. As such, Voitec sanctioned the rise of Nicolae Ceaușescu, participating in his investiture as the first President of Romania (1974). Though his offices were by then largely ceremonial, he used his position to demand privileges for other former Social Democrats, and also obtained reconsideration for Constantin Dobrogeanu-Gherea, the Romanian Marxist classic. Shortly before dying of cancer in 1984, Voitec reportedly expressed regret for his communist conversion, which led to his second marginalization by Ceaușescu. He is remembered for his contributions to cultural development, responsible in large part for the establishment of Craiova University, the National Theater Craiova, and Magazin Istoric journal.

== Biography ==
=== Youth ===
Born in Corabia on June 19, 1900, Voitec declared himself an ethnic Romanian, but was also Italian on his mother's side. Collateral relatives reportedly include the Zanolinis of Friuli, one of whom is doctor Liviu Zanolini. Political memoirist Petre Pandrea, who left hostile notes on Voitec being born in a city of "idiots", also claims that his paternal lineage was Czech, and that Ștefan had eight sisters. The father, Pandrea claims, was a minor clerk, ruined by alcoholism and gambling, who had eventually left his family. As reported years later by politician Ștefan Andrei, Voitec adhered to a moderate strain of socialism, which presupposed toleration of Christian religiosity and even a personal belief in God.

Fluent in Romanian, Italian, and French, young Voitec graduated from Craiova's prestigious high school, Carol I. Aged 18, he became active in the Socialist Party of Romania, writing for its organ Socialismul, as well as for one of the newspapers known as Scânteia. As reported by Pandrea, Voitec was in 1920 a leader of the Socialist Youth Section, on par with Lucrețiu Pătrășcanu. The party as a whole split the following year, with the far-left section emerging as the Romanian Communist Party (PCR, or PCdR), which was soon outlawed; Voitec stayed with the moderate sections, while Pătrășcanu established the Union of Communist Youth. As reported in 1974 by his friend and party colleague Ion Pas, Voitec and himself stood for the Socialists' "centrist current", though they still had "comradely rapports" with PCR activists. In August 1923, Voitec signed up for the League of Human Rights, founded by intellectuals of various hues, and led by Vasile Stroescu. In April of the following year, he signed a letter of protest against Pătrășcanu's arrest for communist subversion. In 1924, Voitec was himself arrested at Corabia by Romania's intelligence arm, the Siguranța. He and 15 co-defendants were fully acquitted in September 1925.

In the meantime, Voitec took a degree from the University of Bucharest School of Polytechnics and Mathematical Faculty (though Pandrea claims he never actually graduated). During his student years, he rallied with the Union of Independent Students, where he was colleagues with Șerban Cioculescu, Octav Livezeanu, Timotei Marin, and Dionisie Pippidi. Finding employment as a substitute teacher at Sfântul Iosif High School in Bucharest, he was forced out of the profession by the state authorities, in 1925. He worked as an editor of Socialismul in 1925–1927, while also reaching out to the "bourgeois democratic press", provided it was "independent and honest". He was for a while a junior editor of Adevărul daily, alongside Iosif Aurescu, who described Voitec as a "tiny little man, of indeterminate age". Journalist George Macovescu also notes that, "for a while", Voitec was the "staunch and careful" curator of Adevărul's reference library and reading room. He married an Italian woman, Victoria Voitec, who is said to have suffered from a chronic illness which required changes of climate; they had a daughter, born in October 1934.

By February 1926, Voitec and Lothar Rădăceanu had joined the Federation of Socialist Parties, which they represented at negotiations to form a political alliance with the PCR front organization, or Peasant Workers' Bloc (BMȚ). In July 1926, he was co-opted by the League Against Terror, alongside Pătrășcanu, Traian Bratu, Constantin Costa-Foru, Mihail Cruceanu, Elena Filipovici, Gala Galaction, Eugen Heroveanu, Barbu Lăzăreanu, Constantin Mille, Panait Mușoiu, Constantin Ion Parhon, Eugen Relgis, Mihail Sadoveanu, Gheorghe Tașcă, and Paul Zarifopol. Voitec was also briefly affiliated with the Social Democratic Party (PSDR), created in 1927 (the year of "great efforts to unify the non-communist left") around Constantin Titel Petrescu. By July 1928, he had joined a faction led by Leon Ghelerter, which was expelled from the PSDR for insubordination. On July 15, they formed their own Socialist Workers Party of Romania (PSMR). This new group attempted to unify radical socialists opposed to the PSDR's reformist stance. As a short-term goal, it favored a cartel with the BMȚ during the December 1928 election. However, it also denounced the PCR as "sectarian", and recruited from its disenchanted members. Over the following period, Voitec and his colleagues gravitated toward Trotskyism, which deepened their ideological break with the outlawed PCR. According to Pandrea, Voitec was also an accountant for a credit cooperative "founded with Jewish American money", which also sponsored Caritas Hospital, serving Romanian Jews. Pandrea alleges that Voitec and Ghelerter used money they "pinched out" of this enterprise to finance the PSMR, a "two-, three-, four-, five-member party".

=== PSU years ===
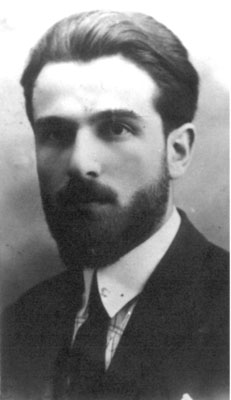
Voitec as a young man

Their PSMR was later joined by breakaways from the PCR, beginning with Gheorghe Cristescu; Constantin Popovici also joined, turning the group into a United Socialist Party (PSU). Unlike the PCR, this new alliance was viewed as harmless by Romanian authorities. Both Voitec and Ghelerter spoke at the workers' meeting in Grivița on May Day 1930, during which "a number of communists who wished to provoke scandal were removed from the location." In 1929, Voitec had been co-opted by the Amnesty Committee, an intellectuals' pressure group which demanded lenience for prisoners serving time on political charges. Serving on its Initiative Committee, he was colleagues with Costa-Foru, Cruceanu, Galaction, Parhon, Pătrășcanu, Nicolae Alexandri, and Petre Constantinescu-Iași. Reportedly, in 1933 Voitec arranged for the newly released Mihail Gheorghiu Bujor to be interned and cared for by Ghelerter.

During the 1930s, the PSU assumed an intermediary position between PCR Stalinists and independent Trotskyists. Trotskyist David Korner acknowledged that Ghelerter helped him circulate pamphlets and recruit affiliates, including inside the PSU itself, but criticized him for his trust in "bourgeois legality". By October 1934, Voitec and Popovici had sealed an alliance between the PSU and Constantinescu-Iași's National Anti-fascist Committee (CNA) and the Labor League, establishing a panel for coordinating actions against the far-right's Iron Guard and National-Christian Defense League. A month later, a delegation comprising both, alongside Constantinescu-Iași, Mihai Roller and Scarlat Callimachi, issued a public protest against perceived injustices against PSU and CNA activists. It referenced allegations that Nicolae Ceaușescu, at the time a junior CNA affiliate, had been brutalized by Police.

Voitec served as PSU Secretary, answering directly to Ghelerter, who was party Chairman; he also participated in the Interparliamentary Socialist Conference of 1931, and negotiated a non-aggression pact with the PCR in 1936. Between these dates, in the legislative election of July 1932, he was a PSU candidate for the Assembly of Deputies, in Baia County (first on that list, ahead of Franț Picolschi). He was editor of the party newspaper, Proletarul, until the latter was banned by the government of Gheorghe Tătărescu in 1935. In June 1934, addressing the PSU congress in Piatra Neamț, Voitec had defined the party's goal as being "the restoration of working-class unity". This effectively meant that the party wished to absorb the PSDR and the PCR into a "united front of proletarian action", primarily dedicated to isolating fascism. Korner also noted that, precisely because it stressed the ideal of "total unity", the PSU could not be interested in joining the Fourth International.

After 1936, relations between the PSU and the PCR were again tense, leading to a scrutiny of Voitec and Ghelerter's stances by Stalinist observers. In July 1937, a notice published by the Unified Socialist Party of Catalonia claimed that the PSU had become an adversary of proletarian solidarity, to emerge as a "Trotskyist agency planted in the bosom of Romania's working class." The following month, the Communist Party of Estonia alleged that Romanian "Trotskyist–Fascists", including Ghelerter, Voitec, Cristescu, and Richard Wurmbrand, worked hand in hand with Iron Guard fascists, as well as with the Siguranța. An anonymous report, published by the Comintern in October, detailed this claim by alleging that Ghelerter had an understanding with the Siguranța, which allowed him to publish texts critical of Soviet communism. The same source also noted that the PSDR was also infiltrated by, and unusually tolerant of, Trotskyist militants. Popovici had by then been expelled from the PSU, after favoring a closer alliance with the mainline communists. This split left Voitec as the sole party Secretary in 1936; a year later, the PSU was folded back into the PSDR. Upon this, Voitec became the PSDR librarian.

=== Wartime stances ===
Despite being soon after banned by the National Renaissance Front, the PSDR remained active in the underground, and Voitec was its Secretary from 1939. The PCR leadership had returned to labeling him a disgraced Trotskyist. Such epithets appear in a February 1939 document, in which the communists argued that a "proletarian front" could only be formed with the PSDR masses, not their leaders. Voitec formally retired from public life during Ion Antonescu's dictatorship (see Romania during World War II). A note left by Ion Vinea suggests that by 1941 Voitec was an editor at Vinea's own newspaper, Evenimentul Zilei. This was a conscious move to undermine Antonescu's censorship by taking in known leftists—Voitec's colleagues included Nicolae Carandino and Miron Radu Paraschivescu. At the time, Voitec was being lambasted for his contribution to interwar socialism; in January 1942, Viața newspaper accused him and Cristescu of having defrauded workers with their cooperative society, which they had remade into an anonymous corporation and sold at a profit. His former colleague in the press, Relgis, reports that in October 1942 Voitec was a custodian for the semi-defunct Adevărul library, which had been taken over by the Ministry of Propaganda. He allegedly used this position to conserve books by Jewish authors whom Antonescu had banned. By then, he had joined the editorial.staff of Carandino's magazine, Bis.

At least one report suggests that Voitec also became a journalist for Curentul, the far-right newspaper. Moreover, enlisted as a regular soldier in the Romanian Land Forces, he supported Antonescu's war in the East as a correspondent for Nazi newspapers such as Der Soldat and Sentinel. His texts were distinctly anti-Soviet, and also affirmed that Bessarabia was rightfully a Romanian province. Voitec worked as a researcher on encyclopedic projects, which were politically tinged. Anti-communist Pamfil Șeicaru recalls validating his employment as editor at Evenimentul Zilei by 1943; he was to work on a "political dictionary", whose purpose was to familiarize Romanians with key concepts in the field. He and Carandino reportedly used this cover to network with anti-fascist resistance cells, placing Voitec's protegé Mircea Ștefanovici in the editorial offices of Tinerețea magazine. In his more public activities, Voitec and Mușoiu attended a ceremony honoring the memory of novelist Panait Istrati, which had Alexandru Talex for a speaker.`

Functioning as an auditor of the Professional Journalists' Union from April 1943, Voitec remained on the PSDR's leadership committee in the anti-fascist underground. By mid-1943, he had been attracted into the movement which sought to depose Antonescu, taking shape as the Patriotic Anti-Hitlerite Front. As PSD delegates, Voitec and Victor Brătfăleanu received from the PCR news that the Comintern had been abolished, which, as Voitec noted, "settled all disputes". He then mediated between the PSDR and the Union of Patriots; the Anti-Hitlerite Front was created in Ghelerter's home, once Voitec resumed contacts with old friends from the CNA and PCR. The Siguranța tolerated his visits with Pătrășcanu, who was under nominal house arrest in Poiana Țapului.

Voitec and Pătrășcanu worked on a shared platform of the Singular Workers' Front, grouping the two left-wing parties; drafted on April 10, it was first publicized on May Day. During May–June 1944, there was a rapprochement of all pro-Allied forces working against Antonescu; a Bloc of Democratic Parties or National Democratic Bloc was formed by the PSDR, the PCR, the National Peasants' Party and the National Liberal Party. With Iosif Jumanca, Voitec served on the initiative committee, which was also joined by Communists Constantinescu-Iași and Vasile Bîgu, by National Peasantists Ioan Hudiță and Nicolae Penescu, as well as by three National Liberals—Bebe Brătianu, Victor Papacostea, and Constantin C. Zamfirescu. Voitec and Jumanca then served as Bloc Secretaries, on behalf of their party. A note by Hudiță suggests that, at the time, Voitec resented Petru Groza and his Ploughmen's Front, who were prevented from joining the coalition. Hudiță claims that Voitec circulated rumors according to which Groza was spying for the Soviets.

=== August 1944 coup ===
The 1944 Romanian coup d'état of August 23, closely followed by a Soviet occupation, brought regime change in Romania. Voitec and Pas were not directly involved in the coup, but awaited its unfolding at a residential building in Rosetti Square. Once informed of Antonescu's arrest, they made their way to the Adevărul offices, where they reissued the socialist newspaper Libertatea. Shortly after, Voitec was promoted to the PSDR Central Committee. On September 3, Voitec, alongside Constantinescu-Iași, Mihai Ralea, Stanciu Stoian and others, produced an appeal calling for a purge of "criminal elements [from] Nazi and Nazi-camouflaged organizations", including the Iron Guard. For a while, he was in Switzerland, and sent his impressions to be published by Fapta, Mircea Damian's Bucharest newspaper. In October, he joined Radu Cioculescu and George Macovescu on the administrative board of Radio Bucharest, where he reportedlky made sure to clamp down on fascist infiltrators.

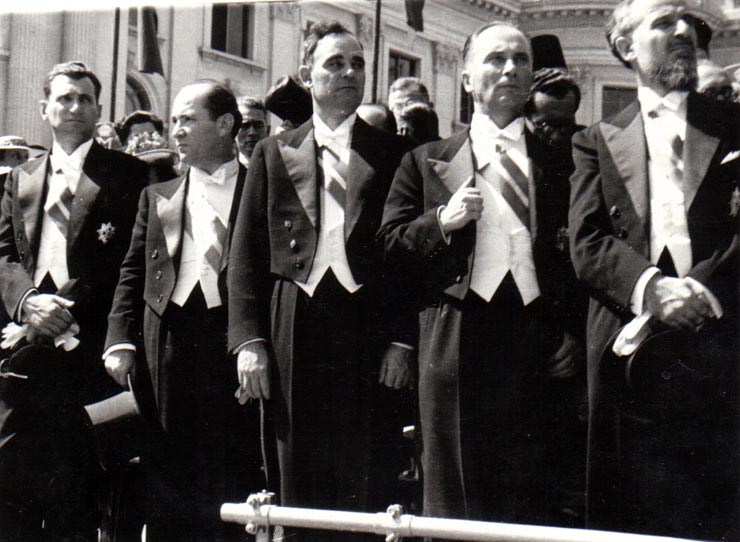
Scene from the first-ever August 23 Parade in Bucharest's Palace Square, 1945. Pictured are five ministers of the Petru Groza cabinet (left to right): Lucrețiu Pătrășcanu, Teohari Georgescu, Gheorghe Gheorghiu-Dej, Lothar Rădăceanu, Voitec

Voitec was Minister of Education—appointed, with Titel Petrescu's support, in Constantin Sănătescu's post-war government. In office from November 5, 1944, some 25 days later he promulgated the "Voitec Law", which reversed educational segregation and allowed Jewish students to matriculate in Romanian schools. This was closely followed by a decree, also signed by Pătrășcanu, Gheorghe Vlădescu-Răcoasa, and Ghiță Pop, which stated that self-reports were the only basis for describing citizens' ethnicity, and made it illegal for the state to research or impose one's ethnic affiliation. Another one of his first ordinances added gymnasium to state-subsidized compulsory education. In March 1945, Voitec joined Parhon, Simion Stoilow, and George Enescu as an honorary patron of the People's University, which was linked to the Romanian Society for Friendship with the Soviet Union. The same month, he intervened to stop Sever Bocu and other National Peasantists from creating the regional University of Timișoara, only allowing a School of Medicine and Faculty of Agronomy to be formed.

In May 1945, Voitec took personal charge of the de-fascization process in education, forming a unified Purging Committee, and legislating that all teaching staff had to submit reports on their activities in 1938–1944. From September, he issued specific orders for "book cleansing" of school libraries, including the elimination of foreign publications, and, in 1946–1947, introduced instead material put out by "democratic publishing houses". By then, his wife had also taken up political duties. As Minister of Justice, Pătrășcanu assigned her to lead the National Orthodox Society of Romanian Women (SONFR), jointly with Titel Petrescu's wife Sofia—effectively, a liquidation committee, as SONFR was no longer active until being finally outlawed in 1948.

Voitec would continue to serve in Groza's cabinets until the official disestablishment of the Kingdom of Romania. Shortly after Groza's takeover, he condemned Romania's "reactionary" past, calling on socialist teachers to erect "a new country, a new ethos, a new form of schooling." A "disciplined minister" in respect to the PCR line, his tenure was marked by an officially-endorsed Stalinist campaign in education, as well as by measures taken to remove and replace non-communist teachers and professors. One focus of his tenure was the takeover of Jewish day schools, on which issue he was opposed by the country's Chief Rabbi, Alexandru Șafran.

=== Rise to prominence ===
On July 6, 1945, Groza and Voitec attended the Inter-Ministerial Conference, regulating contentious issues between Romania and Hungary. It was here that Groza ruled in favor of establishing Bolyai University as a segregated institution for Hungarians in Romania. Answering demands made by Lajos Csőgör, Voitec issued an order which allowed foreign citizens to teach at this institution. In September, Voitec joined the Romanian delegation to Moscow, discussing the application of the Romanian armistice. He and his colleagues were personally received by Soviet leader Joseph Stalin. According to sociologist Dinko Tomašić, this was already a public display of his "obeisance to the lords of the Kremlin." Upon their return to Romania, Groza noted that Voitec had masterminded new forms of Romanian–Soviet cultural cooperation, whose main focus was on liquidating "the insanity and the obscurantism that have dragged peoples into a war."

As members of the communist-led National Democratic Front, Voitec and Lothar Rădăceanu objected when the National Liberal Party–Tătărescu, led and named after the man who had clamped down on PSU activity in 1935, also applied to join the formation. In their counterargument, they depicted Tătărescu as "worse than a scoundrel"; in doing so, they displayed ignorance of the fact that the alliance had already been vetted by Soviet advisers. Together with Rădăceanu, Voitec led the wing of the PSDR that called for a greater alignment with PCR policies. Historian George L. Ostafi noted in 1971 that both men, alongside Pas and Barbu Solomon, illustrated the "Marxist-Leninist" current of social democracy, opposing Șerban Voinea's gradualist socialism. A separate right-wing socialist group also survived, with Ioan Flueraș at its helm. It managed to attract into its ranks Ștefanovici, who, by mid-1945, was an organizer of the anti-communist underground. Voitec and Rădăceanu's positioning was noted by Titel Petrescu, who had also emerged as an opponent of the Groza cabinet; he insisted that both men hand in their resignation from government or quit the party, but the PSDR Executive Committee defeated his resolution.

Several observers remained skeptical of Voitec's pro-communism. Soviet spy S. Pivovarov reported in June 1947 that the PSDR viewed itself as powerful player, who could still govern alone. Pivovarov also quotes Voitec as playing the PCR's factions against each other: he disliked Ana Pauker and Vasile Luca, and concluded that "me and Pătrășcanu, we can take charge of this country". A British report of the same period describes the Moscow visit as a turning point in Voitec's politics, though it also mentions rumors according to which he was privately skeptical about communism. This text suggests that Voitec placed ambition over ideals, in that he wished to ascend politically, even hoping to fill in as Romanian Ambassador to Italy while preserving his ministerial office. In a November 1945 interview with Mark Foster Ethridge, Voitec argued that the 900,000-strong PSDR was in the process of dismantling the National Peasants' Party and absorbing its left-wing factions. He also estimated that the PCR only had 200,000 members, but that these were more ideologically committed. However, he also acknowledged that the distribution of government post between coalition parties was not entirely equitable. Voitec also deplored the "royal strike", expressing hopes that King Michael I could resume his collaboration with Groza. In December, he and Rădăceanu began pressing a common PCR–PSDR list for the 1946 legislative election. According to researcher Victor Frunză, they coordinated their push with agents of the Siguranța, who served communist and Soviet interests. They also obtained support from a Transylvanian faction formed around trade unionist István Lakatos, though the latter had earned the reputation of an anti-communist.

In 1946–1947, Voitec was also a member of the Tătărescu-led Romanian delegation to the Paris Peace Conference, and, as such, one of the signatories of the Peace Treaty with Romania. A rumor recorded by diarist Traian Chelariu had him negotiating with Constantin Vișoianu, a leader of the anti-communist exiles in France. Other accounts have it that Tătărescu and Voitec, being entirely absorbed by economic issues, as well as "subservient to the Russians", ignored another exiled politician, Grigore Gafencu. The latter was trying to obtain their signatures for a note of protest against the Soviet takeover in Bessarabia and northern Bukovina. During Voitec's leave of absence, PSDR activist Poldi Filderman organized meetings between Rădăceanu, Solomon, and other party leaders. An informant for the Siguranța claimed that such talks converged on the need to eventually merge the PSDR and the PCR into a "Singular Workers' Party". Their alleged motivation was "panic" at the realization that they would otherwise be physically destroyed, since the conference would leave Romania inside the Eastern bloc. According to this report: "their only hope is for an international intervention that may yet ease their situation." With Voitec absent, and against his instructions, the party's anti-communist caucus obtained an unusual victory, in that it selected Lakatos for an eligible position on the PSDR list. Voitec accepted this personal humiliation without intervening.

In that context, Voitec also participated in the PSDR's recruitment drive, often with questionable methods. Communist cadres noted that Minister Voitec had coaxed schoolteachers into joining his party, and agreed that "such opportunism must be curbed". A well-known case was that of Ioachim Crăciun, who became Dean of the Cluj Faculty of History after befriending the minister and applying for membership. Voitec boasted having personally convinced Gheorghe Vrănceanu, a renowned mathematician, to join the PSDR. New arrivals included a former Iron Guard poet, David Portase, whom Voitec allegedly regarded as his personal friend. Voitec was nevertheless also supportive of people with anti-fascist credentials, including geologist Benone Constantin, a survivor of the Iași pogrom—who, on his intervention, became the youngest member of the PSDR Central Committee.

=== Communist merger ===
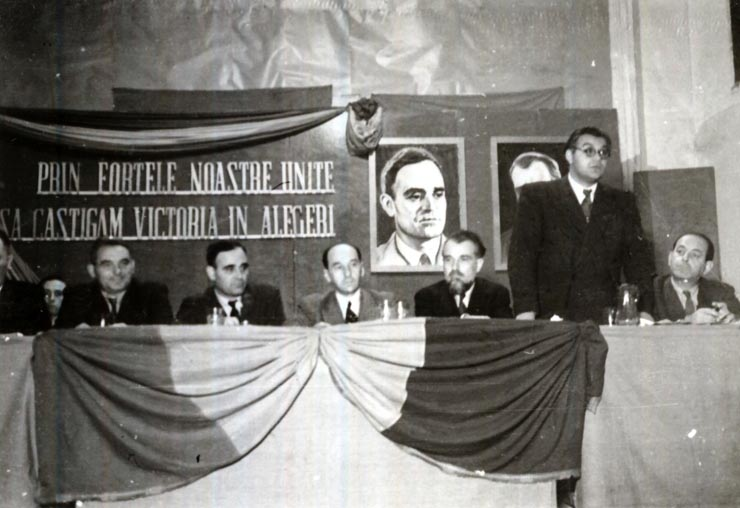
Official tribune at the PCR–PSDR summit at Paris Cinema, October 23, 1946. Miron Constantinescu is speaking; also pictured: Voitec, Gheorghe Gheorghiu-Dej, and Vasile Luca

Rădăceanu and Voitec reintroduced their proposal as a motion during the PSDR's Conference of February–March 1946, where it won the majority endorsement. His conversion notwithstanding, Voitec was chided by Pauker for not being fully committed to the "democratization" of educational institutions, and even called "reactionary". The People's Tribunal noted in mid-1945 that Voitec had failed to verify Vasile Țepordei, a PSDR Bessarabian whom he had appointed to a teacher's position; also then, Voitec and Titel Petrescu performed a discreet favor for the nationalist doctrinaire Nichifor Crainic, who had been sentenced for his activities under Antonescu and was hiding out in the country. In June 1945, as rector of Iași University, Alexander Myller argued that the Minister was too forgiving, and not fully committed to the educational purges. His leniency is also highlighted by historian Șerban Rădulescu-Zoner: Voitec criticized teaching staff at the Central School for Girls for failing to prevent students from attending a monarchist rally in November 1945; however, he refrained from persecuting Elena Malaxa, the headmistress (and sister of industrialist Nicolae Malaxa).

In parallel, Voitec had to deal with rioting students of various political hues. There was Hungarian irredentist agitation in places such as Târgu Mureș; after students held an anti-Romanian rally in February 1946, he dismissed the leadership of the Hungarian Industrial High School. The following month, Sergiu Iacovlov, a National Peasantist enrolled at the Iași Faculty of Medicine, was killed in mysterious circumstances, prompting his party to allege a communist conspiracy "to exterminate the opposition". Voitec and Rector Andrei Oțetea intervened to prevent the students and workers from going into battle with each other over the issue, informing them that the university would be shut down over any additional violence. During the establishment of Bolyai University in Cluj (June 1946), Voitec found himself challenged by a Romanian students' strike. His PSDR colleagues intervened in an attempt to curb it, before Voitec himself ordered a wave of expulsions—including that of Valeriu Anania, depicted as an Iron Guard sympathizer.

In other contexts, Voitec distributed favors to the PCR elite, including his acquaintance Ceaușescu, who was emerging as regional party leader. On Voitec's orders, Ceaușescu's wife Elena was granted a secondary degree in chemistry, though she had never completed her primary education. Pandrea reports that Pătrășcanu "shoved down [Voitec's] throat" a favorite of his, Belu Zilber, who subsequently became a faculty member at the University of Bucharest. During mid-1947, the PCR organized Zilber's marginalization and prosecution, in preparation for Pătrășcanu's own downfall. Voitec initiated (or, according to Zilber himself, was forced to initiate) the purge, by going back on his earlier decision. Voitec's moves engendered a split with Titel Petrescu's Independent Socialist Party in March 1946; the main PSDR moved closer to the PCR. Both Portase and Benone Constantin quit in protest at the promised merger. In September, Gheorghe Gheorghiu-Dej went on a political visit to France, taking with him a PSDR delegation comprising Voitec, Rădăceanu, Filderman, Voinea, and Pavel Pavel. They approached the French Section of the Workers' International, advising it to pursue unity of action with the French Communist Party.

The two Romanian parties were still formally separate during the electoral campaign. The PSDR, which now operated out of Rădăceanu's townhouse, continued to lose cadres, including trade unionist Eftimie Gherman and his partisans. However, it compensated by enlisting new middle-class members, many of whom were Banat Swabians seeking to protect themselves from de-Nazification. Electioneering took Voitec as far north as Oradea, where he attended the largest of all National Democratic rallies. He was therefore present for speeches in which Pătrășcanu and Augustin Bolcaș courted Romanian nationalism for electoral purposes. Voitec appeared on the National Democratic list, winning himself a seat in the Assembly of Deputies, for Dolj County. In the aftermath, Voitec pushed for a complete Communist–Social Democratic merger, but was now opposed by Rădăceanu, who, as reported by the authorities, "did not want to be towed about by the Communist Party". As noted by Combat, Rădăceanu and his followers, who formed a majority, "virulently opposed" Voitec's project to form a single party, preferring instead "an intimate collaboration in Parliament and in government." Voitec, as leader of the "leftist minority", was nevertheless able to overturn the consensus at the 13th PSDR Congress, held on October 9, 1947. In the wake of that reunion, Voitec and Rădăceanu were both General Secretaries of the party.

Fusion talks dragged on to November, also due to opposition from PCR leaders Pătrășcanu and Teohari Georgescu; though he depicted Voitec as an opportunist, Gheorghiu-Dej sanctioned the union, noting that the communists' main priorities called for "liquidating the social democratic brand." By December, Gheorghiu-Dej and Voitec had come to preside over "mixed preparatory commissions" which agreed that the resulting party would be based on Stalin's teachings. At their reunions, they condemned "Anglo-American imperialist circles and their right-wing socialist agents", specifically Ernest Bevin and Léon Blum. Voitec, Pauker, Mișa Levin, Alexandru Moghioroș, Constantin Pârvulescu, Iosif Rangheț and others also organized the first unified PCR–PSDR Congress, in January 1948. The resulting group, known as the Workers' Party (PMR), came to include Voitec on its nomenklatura, probably as recognition for his role in defeating Titel Petrescu. This began immediately after the fusion: on February 24, 1948, he joined the PMR Central Committee, and was simultaneously promoted to its Politburo. Voitec's merger still created situations in which noted anti-communists had found themselves as card-carrying members of a communist party. One such case was that of Ecaterina Bălăcioiu, widow of the culture critic Eugen Lovinescu.

=== Collective presidency ===
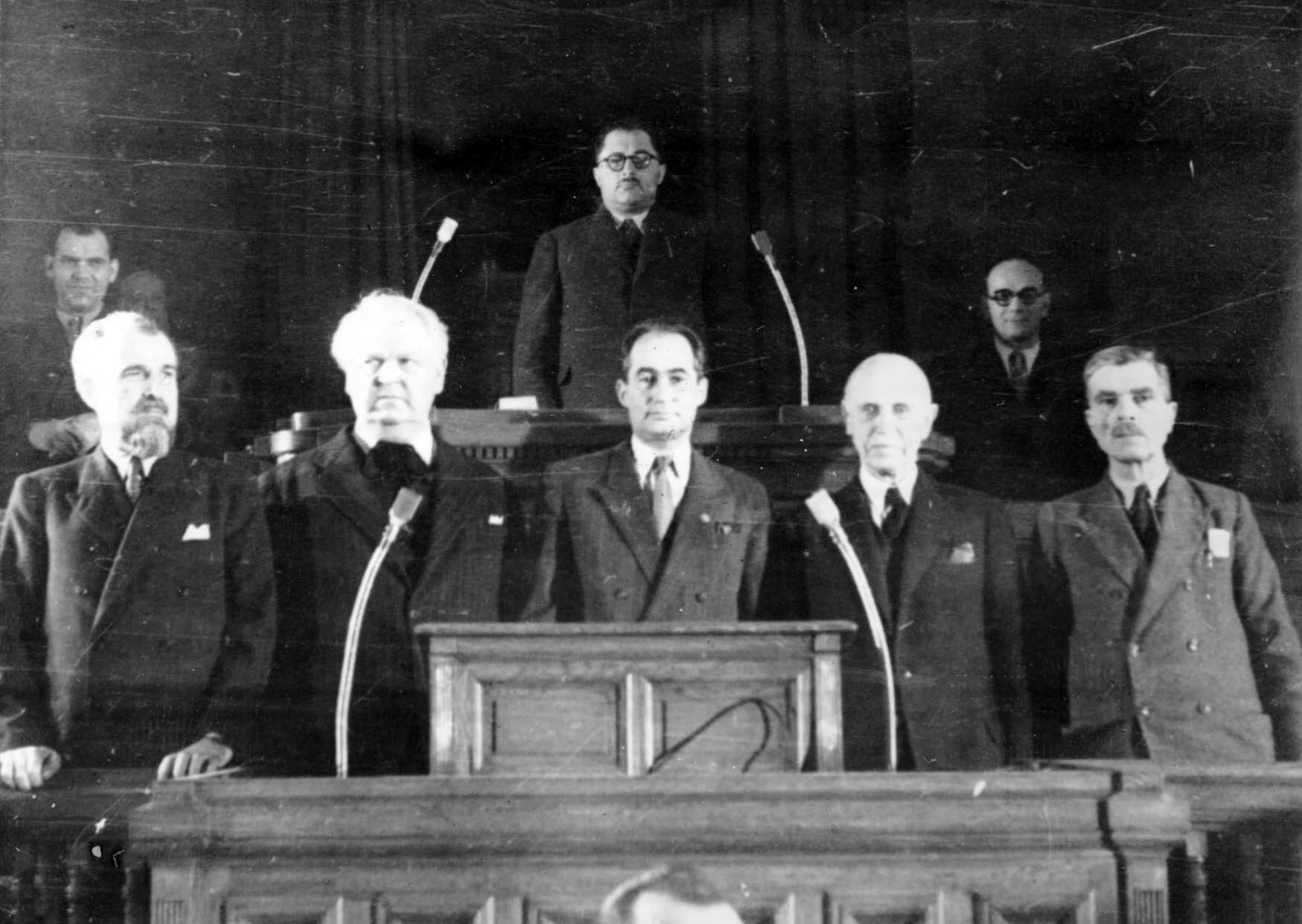
The republican presidium in 1948. From left: Voitec, Mihail Sadoveanu, Gheorghe Stere, Constantin Ion Parhon, Ion Niculi

Voitec's work was still deemed unreliable by the PMR, which organized its own "Political Education Commission", effectively doubling and controlling his Ministry. Under its auspices, Voitec prepared for an overhaul of Romanian education, which was now set to copy the Soviet model; in 1947, he himself led a delegation to study Soviet education practices. Some thirty years later, he acknowledged having received only three directives from Soviet advisors: he was to preserve French as a preferred second language of study, but progressively introduce Russian as the third, substitute Marxism for divinity, and introduce a heavy reliance on mathematics. Applied and "cooperative sciences" were the focus in his creation of Craiova University. Formally established in 1947, it was only partly functional from March 1948, and only existed as a school of agronomy until 1966.

In October 1947, Voitec addressed a congress of the teachers' unions, underscoring the education was to be reformed to "remove destructive ideology from Romanian culture and, above all, from the minds of youths"; in the coming age, dialectical and historical materialism were to be recognized as the bases of all schooling. His measures at the time included opening up Hungarian schools for the Csángós of Cleja, Gârleni and Răcăciuni—as noted by Hungarian journalist Elvira Oláh-Gál, he was mimicking Soviet nationalist policy "in the Stalinist tradition." From November, communist Gheorghe Vasilichi became Minister Voitec's Secretary, and, effectively, his supervisor. Under Vasilichi's watch, the PMR issued circular letters referring to the "messy chaos at the Ministry", and compiled evidence that Voitec had done little to replace old-regime legislation.

Together with Parhon, Mihail Sadoveanu, Gheorghe Stere, and Ion Niculi, Voitec was a member of the People's Republic Presidium—created by Law No. 363 after Michael I's forced abdication on December 30, 1947. Initially, this was designed as a regency, as prescribed under the 1923 Constitution of Romania, but Groza prohibited all mention of the old institutions even before the country could be formally proclaimed a republic. Voitec was one of the first appointees to the Presidium, before Groza ceded his seat to Sadoveanu. Four of the Presidium members were sworn in on the evening of December 30; Stere was only found and inducted on December 31. On January 1, 1948, the Presidium members attended a public rally outside the Royal Palace. Diarist Pericle Martinescu reports that the affair was unusually low-key, with unenthusiastic chants by PMR cadres braving the heavy snowfall, but nonetheless "interesting".

According to historian Apostol Stan, this new constitutional arrangement signaled the introduction of "communist totalitarianism under a republican guise." During his brief tenure within the Presidium, Voitec traveled to the newly proclaimed Hungarian Republic, invited there for the Revolutionary Centennial. As noted by Victor Eftimiu, his speech to the Hungarian Assembly marked the first time a Romanian could report there about "the good relations being formed between the Romanian people and co-inhabiting nationalities, of which the Hungarian group is the most important." From April 14, Voitec served as Deputy Prime Minister in Groza's second cabinet, coordinating all cultural offices. This made him "the highest-ranking among members of [the formerly Social Democratic] group" in government. He had nevertheless lost his Ministry on December 29 or 30, 1947, after falling out of favor with Stalinists. Reportedly, Voitec himself blamed Pauker. She claimed that Voitec was misquoting his Soviet contacts, to make it seem like they were less demanding than the homegrown communists.

Voitec presented himself in the elections of March 1948 for a new communist legislature, the Great National Assembly (MAN), taking a seat at Dolj. That year, he received the Star of the People's Republic and Ordinul Muncii, both 1st Class. During his final months at the Ministry, Voitec signed orders stripping hundreds of academics of their professorships, including those held by his former political allies, Hudiță and Papacostea. Papacostea left notes suggesting that Voitec had actually promised to intervene on his behalf alongside Gheorghiu-Dej, but that he never followed through, and would not answer his phone. During the backlash, Voitec's deputy, Petre Mironescu-Mera, was identified as a "reactionary instrument". Sacked and stripped of his PMR membership with Voitec's approval, he spent 1949–1956 in communist prisons. In early 1948, Voitec asked Mircea Florian, director of the school review board (Casa Școalelor), to leave Titel Petrescu and join his party, or to hand in his resignation; Florian chose the latter, exposing himself to more persecution.

=== Marginalization and return ===
Logo of Centrocoop, which Voitec chaired in 1950–1951

Later in 1948, Voitec allegedly began noticing that he was being cold-shouldered by Gheorghiu-Dej, who was by then top leader of the PMR. A Securitate operative noted that Voitec's own phone line was bugged in 1949, and that it remained so "for years on end". Voitec was still a Deputy Premier to April 16, 1949, when he was sent to a lesser office, as organizer of a Committee for Consumer Cooperatives. Both he and Traian Săvulescu, who was similarly relieved of his duties, declared that they intended to "devote themselves to [other] important functions they are holding." As reported by the Brazilian newspaper A Manha, his ouster and replacement with Vasile Luca were signs that the "communist coup" in Romania had been carried out to its fullest. Over the following months, however, Gheorghiu-Dej became consumed by his rivalry with Pauker and Luca, who ended up losing her positions in the PMR. During January 1950, Voitec was able to maneuver against Pauker by siding with Gheorghiu-Dej and Emil Bodnăraș. According to the anti-communist journal B.E.I.P.I., he was one of "four most obscure Politburo members" who swung the vote against Pauker.

During September 1949, a PMR internal report raised suspicion about Voitec and Constantinescu-Iași, singled out for their friendship with Bruno Manzone, head of Bucharest's Italian Institute and alleged spy. In May 1950, former PSDR man Levin defected abroad, causing indignation among the Politburo. During the summit which evaluated the consequences of these events, Voitec identified Levin as a "scoundrel" who had "acted out of opportunism, even in the social-democratic party." In his memoirs of communist imprisonment, Zilber argues that Gheorghiu-Dej wished to fabricate a show trial of Voitec, Rădăceanu and Pas, preparing George Ivașcu as a witness for the prosecution. Also according to Zilber, investigators were ordered by Alexandru Drăghici to include Voitec into a vast, but fictitious, anti-party conspiratorial network. However, Gheorghiu-Dej eventually found that, in order to ensure cooperation, "it made more sense to appoint [the Social Democrats] as high dignitaries." A lesser clampdown occurred against other former members of the PSDR, including Filderman and the Ghelerter family, who were identified as Trotskyists or right-wing deviationists. According to Pandrea, Filderman's imprisonment was owed to his activities as a Freemason.

By 1950, the Committee for Consumer Cooperatives had become a permanent body, called Centrocoop, with Voitec as its president. His work there included setting up a network of model apiaries, a beekeeping equipment plant in Oradea, and an itinerant school for beekeepers, which originated at Tulcea and then moved to Golești. In parallel, he was chair of Romania's Cycling Commission, presiding upon the Tour of Romania edition in June 1951. He still held on to his position in the PMR Central Committee, but lost his Politburo seat during a reshuffle on May 27, 1952. The November election brought him a MAN deputy seat for his native Corabia—which he then retook in 1957.

On January 28, 1953, Voitec wrote to Gheorghiu-Dej to demand why he was still being prevented from doing "concrete work" toward "the construction of socialism". Stalin's death in March 1953 relaxed pressures on Voitec and his circle. Martinescu notes that a "sweetening of the regime" appeared probable on August 23, 1953, when "Voitec's beard and Rădăceanu's purple-drunk face" could be seen at the PMR's official tribune. Returning to prominence, Voitec occupied important positions during the final years of Gheorghiu-Dej's rule, and preserved them once Ceaușescu took control. His comeback was signaled on October 5, 1955, when Gheorghiu-Dej made him Minister of Internal Trade. In this capacity, he appointed his friend Grigore Păsărin as a branch Director—reportedly, the first industrial worker to take up such a high position at Internal Trade. Voitec himself served to November 24, 1956, the day when he was elevated to Deputy Premier. From December 28, 1952 to July 24, 1965, Voitec was also a junior member of the PMR Politburo. Neither he nor any other among the PSDR arrivals to the Politburo were allowed an actual say in politics; moreover, from December 1955, Voitec remained one of the few interwar non-communists to still be allowed a seat on that panel. In late 1956, he and Constantin Pârvulescu formed the PMR delegation to the 8th Congress of the Italian Communist Party.

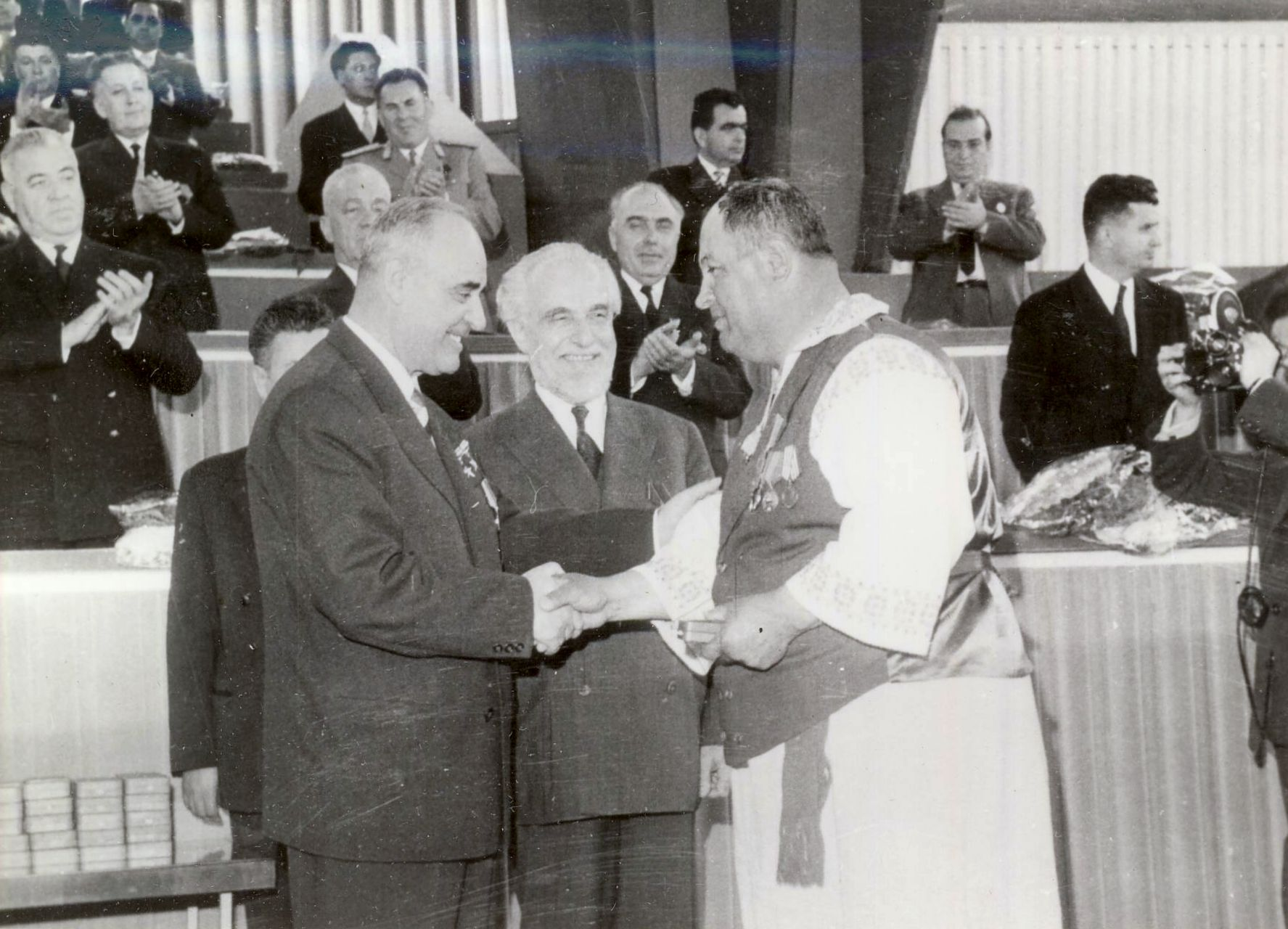
Gheorghiu-Dej and Voitec giving medals at a March 1962 PMR meeting that celebrated the completion of collectivization in Romania

Part of a state delegation to the Soviet Union in November 1957, Voitec survived the tarmac accident at Vnukovo International Airport. In September of the following year, he served with Mihai Beniuc, Athanase Joja and Lucia Sturdza-Bulandra on the citizens' committee which organized a festival marking Bucharest's Quincentennial. In September 1960, he was in New York City with Gheorghiu-Dej and Leonte Răutu, attending the Fifteenth Regular Session of the United Nations General Assembly. They returned on the Queen Mary to Cherbourg, visiting Paris on October 18. During their stay there, they held receptions which were attended by, among others, Louis Aragon, Emmanuel d'Astier de La Vigerie, Pierre Cot, Waldeck Rochet, and Jean-Claude Servan-Schreiber.

=== Under "real socialism" ===
Voitec maintained his government position in the cabinets of Chivu Stoica and Ion Gheorghe Maurer to March 20, 1961, serving as both Deputy Premier and Minister of Trading Goods (March 28, 1957 – April 17, 1959). He was again sent to the MAN in the election of 1961, this time as a representative of the Electroputere workers, in Craiova. He continued to represent that constituency for three more electoral cycles, being reconfirmed for the seat one final time in March 1980. On March 25, 1961, while losing his position as Deputy Premier, Voitec became one of three acting Chairmen of the State Council.

Moving up to compensate for Pârvulescu's downfall, in 1961 Voitec was assigned Chairmanship of the MAN. In this capacity, he presided over the special parliamentary meetings of April 1962, which were held at the National Economy Pavilion and celebrated the completion of collectivization in Romania. He served as MAN leader continuously to March 1974, though he had lost his post in the State Council in 1965. In 1964, he was also serving on the National Council of the People's Democratic Front (the reshuffled National Democratic Front). Tomašić notes that, in 1961, Voitec was still only an "outer-ring" leader of the PMR, speculating that he was mistrusted, and deemed unworthy, "because of his Social-Democratic past, his university education, his intellectual cast of mind, and also because of his Italian wife". Signals about his heterodox convictions were still sent by General Dumitru Petrescu, who had been sidelined for "fractionism". In 1964, he sent an exculpatory letter to Gheorghiu-Dej, reminding him that Voitec had once been a Trotskyist.

March 1965 marked Gheorghiu-Dej's death, with Voitec included on the honor guard at the funeral. Apostol Stan identifies Voitec, alongside Bodnăraș and Maurer, as one of Ceaușescu's key accomplices in the power struggle which took place over the following weeks. Upon Ceaușescu's ascendancy, on July 24, Voitec was advanced to full member of the Executive Committee of the Romanian Communist Party—as the Politburo and the PMR had been renamed. Like some of his colleagues there (including Răutu, Paul Niculescu-Mizil, Gogu Rădulescu, and Leontin Sălăjan), he had the distinction of not having served on the last Politburo. He maintained this office to the day of his death.

Voitec presided upon the MAN session of August 21, 1965, which passed a new constitution, enshrining Romania's claim to have achieved real socialism. In his closing speech, he referred to this as a "historic session", and argued that the new organic law had increased the political and social profiles of MAN deputies. On August 29 of the following year, he was assigned to the honor guard overseeing Sălăjan's funeral. Also in 1966, Voitec received the Order of Tudor Vladimirescu, 1st Class, followed in 1971 by the Order of Socialist Victory, and in 1974 by his recognition as a Hero of Socialist Labor. During November 1967, he led a MAN delegation to Iran, invited there by the Imperial Senate. In May 1968, he welcomed at the MAN the French President Charles de Gaulle, and gave the introductory speech. During March 1972, he was in Slovakia, at Zvolen, where he and other MAN delegates honored the memory of Romanian soldiers fallen in the battles of 1945. This was followed in October 1972 by another visit to the Soviet Union, where he met high-ranking members of the Supreme Soviet, including Vasily Konotop and Alexey Shitikov.

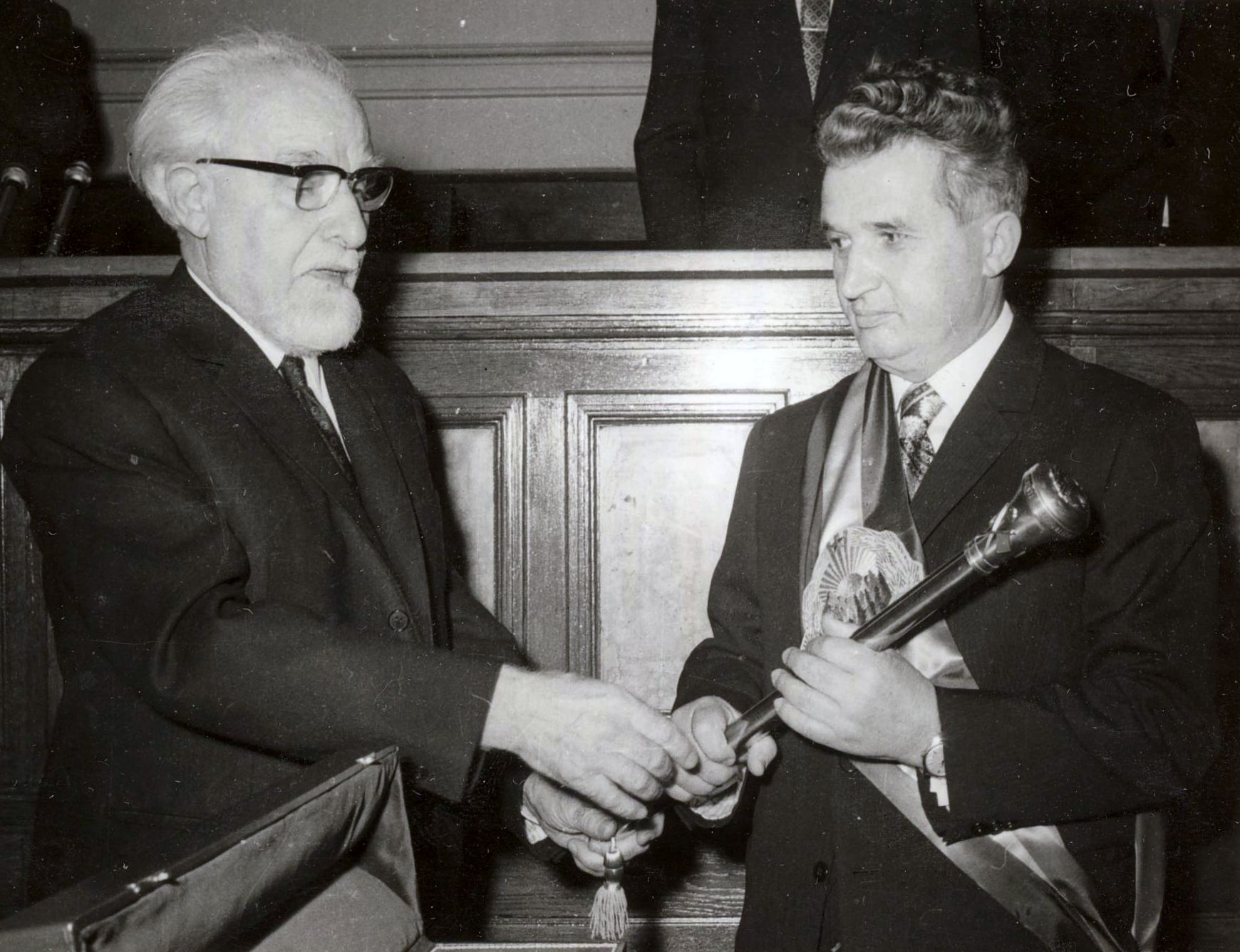
Voitec hands Nicolae Ceaușescu a sceptre to mark Ceaușescu's election as President (March 28, 1974)

Other structural shifts came during those years. On March 28, 1974, following election by the Assembly, Voitec invested Ceaușescu as the first President of Romania. This included a ceremony during which the outgoing Assembly President handed a scepter to the executive leader. As noted by Larousse's Journal de l'année, Voitec may have been pressured into relinquishing his leadership of the MAN, so as to "further consolidate [Ceaușescu's] position." The renunciation closely followed Maurer's retirement, which was officially attributed to health complications from an earlier car crash. In 1969, Voitec himself had survived a collision between his car and a Ford Taunus, which, as he put it, "nearly killed me". Upon discovering that the offending driver was a food retailer who could afford luxuries, Voitec openly criticized market socialism as still applied in that industry.

=== Old age and death ===
During the reshuffle, Voitec returned to the Council of State as a Vice President, and continued to serve in that capacity until his death. This position was by then largely ceremonial, as was his election to the Superior Council for Education in February 1980. Voitec was also assigned to Ceaușescu's new mass organization, the Front of Socialist Unity and Democracy. He represented this body on an official visit to the German Democratic Republic, celebrating that regime's silver jubilee (October 1974). In April 1976, he reported to the Assembly on the institution of a Legislative Chamber of the People's Councils, which, Ceaușescu argued, was meant to democratize decision-making in the field of economy, particularly by vetting the Five-Year Plan. During the 34th anniversary of the coup against Antonescu in August 1978, Voitec chaired a meeting of communist delegates from various countries (including Luigi Longo and Giancarlo Pajetta). He spoke to them about establishing a new type of communist unity, around "independence, full equality, and respect for each party's right to autonomously enshrine its own general political line, strategy, and revolutionary tactic"; he also highlighted the importance of cooperation with social democratic and progressive groups.

In 1975, anti-communist intellectual Noël Bernard suggested that Voitec still had no real power "in today's Romania." Four years later, Bernard observed that the MAN had "approved everything that the party has submitted to a vote". During that interval, Voitec had turned to scholarly pursuits. He and Ion Popescu-Puțuri, alongside manuscript editor Augustin Deac, curated the complete works of Marxist doctrinaire Constantin Dobrogeanu-Gherea, appearing at Editura Politică between 1976 and 1983. From 1977, Voitec, Niculescu-Mizil, Răutu and Rădulescu were assigned to a preparatory committee for the 15th International Congress of Historical Sciences, which was held in Bucharest in 1980—and which Ceaușescu ultimately used for broadcasting Dacianist theories. Voitec also appeared at the Dolj Communist Party conference on November 8, 1979, reading out Ceaușescu's "congratulations for [Dolj's] successes in fulfilling the objectives of the five-year plan".

On June 18, 1980, Voitec was elected a full member of the Romanian Academy, and was reconfirmed as a member of the Star of the Socialist Republic. However, these months allegedly witnessed his second sidelining and brief disappearance from public life. Reports emerged that Voitec had used the occasion of his 80th birthday to criticize the regime and express his regrets about political choices. In January 1981, diarist and literary critic Mircea Zaciu heard rumors that Ceaușescu was preparing to have the "old ex-profiteer" kept under house arrest. Voitec and the President appeared together to cast their vote in the local elections of November 1982—part of a group which also included Elena Ceaușescu, Niculescu-Mizil, Emil Bobu, Miu Dobrescu, Suzana Gâdea, Alexandrina Găinușe, Nicolae Giosan, and Ilie Verdeț. By 1983, Radio Free Europe was commenting on the growth of Nicolae Ceaușescu's personality cult, noting that charismatic party leaders were disappearing from group photos as time progressed. Voitec had returned to the foreground, but as an "old obedient piece of social-democratic furniture".

Voitec was twice operated on for colorectal cancer (malignant colorectal stenosis), but the disease relapsed and formed metastases in his lungs and blood vessels. Kept under watch by Health Minister Eugen Proca, he died at a hospital in Bucharest at 12.45 PM, on December 4, 1984. According to one account, supposedly passed on by one of his attending physicians, he had spent his final days castigating himself, continuously repeating: "what have I done?"

== Legacy ==
=== Immediate posterity ===
Voitec's body was incinerated; the urn was stored at the Monument of the Heroes for the Freedom of the People and of the Motherland, for Socialism in Carol Park. The complex wad seen as a shameful relic after the anti-communist revolt of 1989, and the graves were being emptied in early 1990. In that context, the removal of Voitec's urn generated more debates than for other communist leaders; it was ultimately sent back to the nearby crematorium, where it remained unclaimed by relatives. Victoria had outlived her husband by less than three years, to April 1987. Surviving them was their daughter, Mira Graziela Voitec, married Dordea, who trained as an architect (she died in December 2017).

Reportedly, Ștefan Voitec's Dobrogeanu-Gherea edition remains "virtually irretrievable in public libraries", possibly because of an anti-communist literary purge, which took place "in the early months of 1990". According to newspaper reports, Voitec had been registered as a voter in post-communist Romanian elections as late as November 1996; based on his address, he had been assigned to the Jean Monnet Section, in Primăverii. In 2002, it became apparent that Florian Enache, who was serving on the post-revolutionary Privatization Board (APAPS), had been a Securitate asset and Voitec's assistant. Asked to comment, Enache stated: "you should know that Voitec was one of those who still raised their voice to protest. I, for one, have had a lot to learn from that man!"

=== Posthumous image ===
==== As an icon of opportunism ====
Historian Sorin Radu identifies Voitec, Rădăceanu, and "up to a point Titel Petrescu" as opportunists who "compromised the ideals of social democracy and of democracy as a political system". As noted by Radu, the label of "collaborator", applied by the Voitec faction to right-wing socialists such as Ioan Flueraș, can be applied to Voitec himself, in relation to the PCR. A former colleague at Bis magazine, Ilie Păunescu, recalled in 1991: "[Voitec] was no journalist, and later, to my regret, I observed that he was no politician either; from a man of leftist convictions, Voitec turned into a kind of socialist hybrid, a traitor to the cause." Writing Voitec's obituary in 1984, exile political scientist Vladimir Tismăneanu argued:

In his own way, very often a contradictory way, tinged by justified fears and unavowable doubts, Ștefan Voitec's political praxis most categorically stood apart from that of his 'thoroughbred' communist comrades. Without overexposing himself, without venturing into unwinnable political squabbles, Voitec took care not to become anything more than the spectator to a political game which he felt was fundamentally alien to his psyche.

Tismăneanu cautions that such traits could not bracket out Voitec's "capital role in undermining the legitimate leadership of Romanian social democracy": "Alongside Lothar Rădăceanu, he contributed to maintaining confusion in the mass base of the social democratic party, cautioned collaborationist stances, and gave his approval to the operation which ended with the 'big gulp' of social democracy in the so-called unification congress of February 1948." In the post-communist decade, Sergiu Cunescu led a revived Social Democratic Party. He was replaced as chairman by Alexandru Athanasiu, who in 2000 aligned the party with the stronger Party of Social Democracy, widely seen as a successor of the PCR; commenting on these developments, which he opposed, Cunescu depicted Athanasiu as a "new Ștefan Voitec".

According to Stan, Voitec, like Maurer and Alexandru Bârlădeanu, was a man of "certain intellectual openness", and as such stood above other figures in Gheorghiu-Dej's "clan", itself largely formed around "mediocrities". Before their ideological split, Titel Petrescu had commended "my friend Ștefan Voitec" for his work in collecting "socialist literature and old documents". Tismăneanu notes that Voitec was once regarded as the would-be theoretician of Romanian moderate socialism, "one who was so very well acquainted with the works of Karl Kautsky and Eduard Bernstein", and therefore fully educated about the critique of communism from the left. The same issue had been raised in 1963 by his exiled former employer, Pamfil Șeicaru, who ridiculed the "bird-brained" cadres of all democratic parties: "Voitec was well trained in Marxist sociology and knew the history of Soviet Russia. What then could he expect from those who invaded our Country?" However, in 1949, anarchist Alberto Casanueva argued that ministers such as Voitec, Gheorghiu-Dej, and Mihail Lascăr had lost prominence because of their failure to uphold the Soviet line, whereas Pauker and Pârvulescu were rewarded for their staunch Stalinism.

There are also indications that Voitec was made malleable by his political dossier. Memoirist Adrian Dimitriu notes that Titel Petrescu once tried to defend Voitec's contribution to Nazi propaganda as authorized by the PSDR, because it could spare him from being called under arms; however, both this episode and his earlier Trotskyism exposed Voitec to permanent communist blackmail. Claiming to report a statement by communist militant Valentina Mihăileanu, Pandrea suggests that Voitec's "fundamental trait" was his cowardice. The incriminating articles were therefore written by Voitec "for fear, fear of the Soviet–Hitlerist war". Following their break with Stalin, Titoist authorities in neighboring Yugoslavia (where his name was casually misprinted as "Noitek") also used this detail against Romanian Stalinists. An April 1950 article in Vjesnik underscored that Voitec, a Central Committee man, had been a "fascist journalist on the Eastern Front".

Historian Ovidiu Bozgan suggests that Voitec should be noted for his "philosophy of survival and weariness". This remark was prompted to Bozgan a 1961 dialogue between Voitec and the French ambassador, Pierre Bouffanais. When the latter commented on the paradox that Pauker, once depicted as a rightist, was condemned by the same regime as a "Stalinist", Voitec allegedly replied: "Let those folks carry on with their small business." According to Tomašić, by that moment Voitec's services to the PMR were purely ideological:

[Voitec represents] the myth of "Socialist unity" to the outside world. Within such a framework, Voitec might be used as a link with the Social Democrats in the countries outside the Soviet orbit, particularly since the Kremlin counts on the support of Socialists and other left-wing circles in its various "peace" and "coexistence" moves.

==== Private networking and cultural profile ====
In December 1944, Ion Vinea reported his disappointment that Voitec would not defend him, and would not vouch for him as an anti-fascist. With time, however, Voitec became recognized as a protector of his PSDR and PSU colleagues. He intervened in favor of sociologist Henri H. Stahl, brother of the disgraced Șerban Voinea, who had publicized his unorthodox belief that Romanian history was rooted in "Asiatic despotism" and had introduced his pupils to Bernstein's work. In 1951, Voitec asked that Poldi Filderman be granted a fair trial, though making it clear that he himself would not dispute the charges. After 1958, he personally obtained rehabilitation for Radu Grigorovici, the orphaned son of Social Democratic leader George Grigorovici. In 1969, he arranged for Victor Papacostea's daughter, historian Cornelia Papacostea-Danielopolu, to be granted a Romanian passport, which allowed her to visit France. By 1970, Voitec was openly demanding that the PSDR and PSU membership be recognized by the PCR as a pedigree similar to that of first-generation communists.

In old age, Voitec also maintained a correspondence with his old political friend, Gheorghe Cristescu, who had since been imprisoned and rehabilitated by the communist regime. As noted by historian Corneliu C. Ilie, the letters display Cristescu's "uncanny mental frailty". In March 1968, Voitec reportedly intervened to prevent Cristescu from publicly marking the golden jubilee of the Romanian–Bessarabian union. As he argued, this celebration, organized by Pan Halippa, would have drawn negative coverage in the Soviet Union. Voitec attended the funeral of Cristescu's wife Aneta Victoria, which witnessed another one of Halippa's attempts at a protest. Also in 1968, Voitec reputedly hinted to the exiled writer Otto Eduard Marcovici that he could return home and resume work in the communist press.

As an Education Minister, Voitec had an ambiguous legacy. According to writer Felix Aderca, his reform of the gymnasiums was a positive measure, which could civilize Romanian youths. For this reason, Voitec's name "shall never be forgotten." By contrast, the anti-communist educationist Onisifor Ghibu defined his tenure as engendering "the corruption of youth, the betrayal of religion, without even an effort to justify these". Later in life, one of Voitec's main cultural achievements was his successful attempt to obtain posthumous recognition for Dobrogeanu-Gherea, who had been the heterodox doyen of Romanian Marxism. As a cultural aficionado and MAN deputy, he also played a major part in approving and constructing the new National Theater Craiova (1966–1973). Voitec cultivated Craiova historian Titu Georgescu, with whom he would discuss affairs in "our native city." According to Georgescu, in 1967 Voitec helped convince hardliner Leonte Răutu to allow the publication of a popular history review, Magazin Istoric. Its very first issue featured a history of the Singular Workers' Front, which was partly based on Voitec's oral testimony.

Voitec was additionally remembered for his Van Dyke beard, which reportedly made him a "pleasant figure", but also exposed him to further ridicule. Lucrețiu Pătrășcanu once referred to Voitec as "that beard", while Pandrea records that he was universally known as the "bearded lady". From 1948, Voitec was the only Romanian communist leader to go unshaven, his style appearing especially "strange" by 1957. In 1959, the authorities clamped down on beatnik lifestyles, including by having Militiamen forcefully shave non-compliant youth. According to historian Matei Cazacu, those beatniks who complained that Voitec was bearded, as an attempt to litigate the issue, "were reserved the harshest punishments".
