= Second Dăscălescu cabinet =

Romanian government cabinet

The second cabinet of Constantin Dăscălescu was the government of Romania from March 29, 1985, to December 22, 1989. It resigned in the aftermath of the Romanian Revolution. Four days later, it was succeeded by the First Roman cabinet.

== Composition ==
- Presidents of the Council of Ministers

Constantin Dăscălescu (March 29, 1985, to December 22, 1989)

=== Vice Presidents of the Council of Ministers ===
- First Vice-President of the Council of Ministers

Elena Ceaușescu (March 29, 1985, to December 22, 1989)

- First Vice-President of the Council of Ministers

Gheorghe Oprea (March 29, 1985, to December 22, 1989)

- First Vice-President of the Council of Ministers

Ion Dincă (March 29, 1985, to December 22, 1989)

- Vice-President of the Council of Ministers

Ludovic Fazekas (March 29, 1985, to December 22, 1989)

- Vice-President of the Council of Ministers

Gheorghe Petrescu (March 29, 1985, to September 29, 1987)

- Vice-President of the Council of Ministers

Alexandrina Găinușe (March 29, 1985, to June 17, 1986)
Aneta Spornic (June 17, 1986, to September 11, 1987)

- Vice-President of the Council of Ministers

Ion M. Nicolae (March 29, 1985, to August 26, 1986)

- Vice-President of the Council of Ministers

Ioan Totu (March 29, 1985, to August 26, 1986)

- Vice-President of the Council of Ministers

Ioan Avram (March 29 - October 17, 1985)

- Vice-President of the Council of Ministers

Nicolae Constantin (March 29, 1985, to April 14, 1987)
Neculai Ibănescu (April 14, 1987, to March 17, 1989)

- Vice-President of the Council of Ministers

Ion C. Petre (November 8, 1985, to September 11, 1987)

- Vice-President of the Council of Ministers

Cornel Pacoste (August 26, 1986, to December 22, 1989)

- Vice-President of the Council of Ministers

Dimitrie Ancuța (August 26, 1986, to September 11, 1987)

- Vice-President of the Council of Ministers

Ștefan Andrei (September 11, 1987, to December 22, 1989)

- Vice-President of the Council of Ministers

Ion Constantinescu (September 11, 1987, to April 29, 1988)
Barbu Petrescu (April 29 - November 16, 1988)
Ion Radu (November 16, 1988, to December 22, 1989)

- Vice-President of the Council of Ministers

Lina Ciobanu (September 12, 1987, to December 22, 1989)

- Vice-President of the Council of Ministers

Constantin Radu (September 30, 1987, to May 20, 1988)

=== Ministers ===
- Minister of the Interior

George Homoștean (March 29, 1985, to October 3, 1987)
Tudor Postelnicu (October 3, 1987, to December 22, 1989)

- Minister of Foreign Affairs

Ștefan Andrei (March 29 - November 8, 1985)
Ilie Văduva (November 8, 1985, to August 26, 1986)
Ioan Totu (August 26, 1986, to November 2, 1989)
Ion Stoian (November 2 - December 22, 1989)

- Minister of Justice

Gheorghe Chivulescu (March 29, 1985, to October 3, 1987)
Maria Bobu (October 3, 1987, to December 22, 1989)

- Minister of National Defence

Constantin Olteanu (March 29, 1985 - December 16, 1985)
Vasile Milea (December 16, 1985, to December 22, 1989)

- President of the State Planning Committee (with the rank of minister) (from November 3, 1989, it was named President of the State Planning and Technical-Material Supply Committee)

Ștefan Bârlea (March 29, 1985, to June 17, 1988)
Radu Bălan (June 20, 1988, to November 2, 1989)
Ioan Totu (November 3 - December 22, 1989)

- Minister of Finance

Petre Gigea (March 29, 1985, to August 26, 1986)
Alexandru Babe (August 26, 1986, to December 5, 1987)
Gheorghe Paraschiv (December 5, 1987, to March 17, 1989)
Ion Pățan (March 27, 1989 - December 22, 1989)

- Ministry of Metallurgical Industry

Neculai Agachi (March 29, 1985 - December 16, 1985)
Marin Enache (December 16, 1985 - December 22, 1989)

- Minister of Chemical Industry

Gheorghe Dinu (March 29, 1985 - December 22, 1989)

- Minister of Petrochemical Industry

Adrian Stoica (August 10, 1985 - December 22, 1989)

- Minister of Mines (on June 20, 1986, the Ministry of Mines was abolished)

Marin Ștefanache (March 29 - October 18, 1985)
Ilie Verdeț (October 18, 1985 - June 20, 1986)
Marin Ștefanache (September 3, 1987 - November 23, 1988)
Irimie Catargiu (November 23, 1988 - December 22, 1989)

- Minister of Petroleum (on June 20, 1986, the Ministry of Petroleum was abolished)

Ilie Câșu (March 29, 1985 - June 20, 1986)
Nicolae Amza (September 3, 1987 - December 22, 1989)

- Minister of Geology (on June 20, 1986, the Ministry of Geology was abolished)

Ioan Folea (March 29, 1985 - June 20, 1986)

- Minister of Mines, Petroleum, and Geology

Ioan Folea (June 20, 1986 - September 3, 1987)

- Minister of Electric Power

Nicolae Bușui (March 29 - October 17, 1985)
Ion Licu (October 17, 1985 - March 7, 1986)
Ioan Avram (March 7, 1986 - September 29, 1987)
Petre Fluture (September 30, 1987 - December 22, 1989)

- Minister of Wood and Building Materials Industrialization

Richard Winter (March 29, 1985 - September 1, 1987)
Gheorghe Constantinescu (September 1, 1987 - December 22, 1989)

- Minister of Industrial Construction

Ion C. Petre (March 29 - November 8, 1985)
Ioan Avram (November 8, 1985 - March 7, 1986)
Alexandru Dimitriu (April 1, 1986 - December 22, 1989)

- Minister of Machine Building Industry

Alexandru Necula (March 29 - July 28, 1985)
Marin Nedelcu (July 28, 1985 - May 6, 1987)
Șerban Teodorescu (May 6, 1987 - May 20, 1988)
Radu Paul Păunescu (May 20 - November 16, 1988)
Alexandru Roșu (November 16, 1988 - January 24, 1989)
Eugeniu Rădulescu (February 3 - December 22, 1989)

- Minister of Heavy Equipment Industry

Mihai Moraru (July 28, 1985 - September 1, 1987)
Gheorghe Dinu (September 1, 1987 - February 3, 1988)
Radu Paul Păunescu (February 3 - May 20, 1988)

- Minister of Electrotechnical Industry

Alexandru Necula (July 28, 1985 - October 3, 1987)
Nicolae Vaidescu (October 3, 1987 - December 22, 1989)

- Minister of Light Industry

Ion Pățan (March 29, 1985 - May 5, 1986)
Alexandrina Găinușe (May 5, 1986 - February 3, 1987)
Lina Ciobanu (February 3 - September 12, 1987)
Maria Flucsă (September 12, 1987 - December 22, 1989)

- Minister of Agriculture and Food Industry (from December 20, 1985, it was called the Minister of Agriculture)

Gheorghe David (March 29, 1985 - December 22, 1989)

- Minister of Forestry

Ion Cioară (March 29, 1985 - January 17, 1986)
Eugen Tarhon (January 17, 1986 - December 22, 1989)

- Minister of Food Industry and Procurement of Agricultural Products (from January 18, 1988, it was called the Minister of Food Industry)

Gheorghe Pană (December 16, 1985 - July 11, 1986)
Paula Prioteasa (July 11, 1986 - December 22, 1989)

- Minister of Procurement and Procurement of Agricultural Products

Constantin Zanfir (January 18, 1988 - December 22, 1989)

- Minister of Internal Trade

Ana Mureșan (March 29, 1985 - December 22, 1989)

- Minister of Foreign Trade and International Economic Cooperation

Vasile Pungan (March 29, 1985 - August 26, 1986)
Ilie Văduva (August 26, 1986 - June 17, 1988)
Ioan Ungur (June 22, 1988 - December 22, 1989)

- Minister of Technical-Material Supplies and Fixed Assets Management Control (on November 3, 1989, the Ministry was abolished)

Petre Preoteasa (March 29, 1985 - October 3, 1987)
Ion C. Petre (October 3, 1987 - April 29, 1988)
Gheorghe Stoica (April 29, 1988 - November 3, 1989)

- Minister of Transport and Telecommunications

Vasile Bulucea (March 29, 1985 - August 9, 1986)
Pavel Aron (August 9, 1986 - December 22, 1989)

- Minister of Tourism

Ion Stănescu (March 29, 1985 - December 22, 1989)

- Minister of Health

Victor Ciobanu (March 29, 1985 - December 22, 1989)

- Minister of Labor

Maxim Berghianu (March 29, 1985 - December 22, 1989)

- Minister of Education and Research

Ion Teoreanu (March 29, 1985 - December 22, 1989)

- Minister for Youth Issues (as the General Secretary of the C.C. of the U.T.C.)

Nicu Ceaușescu (March 29, 1985 - October 17, 1987)
Ioan Toma (October 17, 1987 - December 22, 1989)

=== Secretary of State Ministers ===
- Minister Secretary of State at the Ministry of Internal Affairs and Head of the State Security Department

Tudor Postelnicu (March 29, 1985 - October 3, 1987)
Iulian Vlad (October 3, 1987 - December 22, 1989)

- Minister Secretary of State at the Ministry of Foreign Affairs

Aurel Duma (March 29, 1985 - December 22, 1989)

- Minister Secretary of State at the Ministry of Agriculture and Food Industry, Head of the Department of Food Industry

Marin Capisizu (March 29, 1985 - December 22, 1989)

- Minister Secretary of State at the Ministry of Agriculture and Food Industry, Head of the Department for Contracting, Procurement, and Storage of Agricultural Products

Ion Albulețu (March 29 - July 10, 1985)
Teodor Roman (July 10 - December 20, 1985)

- Minister Secretary of State at the Ministry of Agriculture and Food Industry, Head of the Department of State Agriculture

Costel Eremia (March 29 - May 14, 1985)
Florea Gruia (May 14, 1985 - June 16, 1989)
Viorel Vizureanu (June 16 - December 22, 1989)

- Minister Secretary of State at the Ministry of Agriculture and Food Industry

Ferdinand Nagy (March 29, 1985 - December 22, 1989)

- Minister Secretary of State at the Ministry of Technical-Material Supply and Control of Fixed Funds

Dumitru Bejan (March 29, 1985 - December 12, 1988)

- Minister Secretary of State, Head of the Department of Technical-Material Supply at the State Planning and Technical-Material Supply Committee

Gheorghe Stoica (November 3 - December 22, 1989)

- Minister Secretary of State at the Ministry of Machine Building Industry

Mihai Moraru (March 29 - July 28, 1985)

- Minister Secretary of State at the Ministry of Machine Building Industry

Vasile Baltac (March 29 - July 28, 1985)

- Minister Secretary of State at the Ministry of Machine Building Industry

Ion Licu (March 29 - July 28, 1985)

- Minister Secretary of State at the Ministry of Chemical Industry

Adrian Stoica (March 29 - August 10, 1985)

- Minister Secretary of State at the Ministry of Foreign Trade and International Economic Cooperation

Alexandru Roșu (March 29, 1985 - January 15, 1987)
Traian Dudaș (January 15 - September 11, 1987)
Cornel Pânzaru (September 11, 1987 - December 22, 1989)

- Minister Secretary of State at the Ministry of Foreign Trade and International Economic Cooperation

Gheorghe Cazan (March 29, 1985 - September 11, 1987)
Constantin Stanca (September 29, 1987 - June 17, 1988)
Alexandru Necula (June 22, 1988 - December 22, 1989)

- Head of the Central Department of Geology (with the rank of Minister Secretary of State)

Ioan Folea (September 3, 1987 - December 22, 1989)

- President of the Council of Culture and Socialist Education

Suzana Gâdea (March 29, 1985 - December 22, 1989)

- President of the National Council for Science and Technology (with the rank of Minister)

Elena Ceaușescu (March 29, 1985 - December 22, 1989)

- Deputy President of the National Council for Science and Technology (with the rank of Minister)

Ioan Ursu (March 29, 1985 - December 22, 1989)

- Minister Secretary of State at the National Council for Science and Technology

Emilian Dobrescu (March 29, 1985 - December 9, 1988)

- Minister Secretary of State at the National Council for Science and Technology

Mihail Florescu (March 29, 1985 - December 22, 1989)

- President of the Committee for the Issues of the People's Councils (with the rank of Minister)

Teodor Coman (March 29, 1985 - August 26, 1986)
Gheorghe Pană (August 26, 1986 - December 22, 1989)

- Deputy President of the State Planning Committee (with the rank of Minister Secretary of State)

Ion Ceaușescu (March 29, 1985 - December 22, 1989)

- Minister Secretary of State at the State Planning Committee

Ion Constantinescu (March 29, 1985 - September 11, 1987)
Barbu Petrescu (September 29, 1987 - April 29, 1988)
Vasile Bulucea (May 14, 1988 - October 20, 1989)
Șerban-Dumitru Teodorescu (November 11 - December 22, 1989)

- President of the State Prices Committee (with the rank of Minister Secretary of State)

Aneta Spornic (March 29, 1985 - June 17, 1986)
Ion Pățan (June 17, 1986 - December 22, 1989)

- President of the National Council for Environmental Protection (with the rank of Minister)

Ion Badea (July 11, 1986 - December 22, 1989)

- President of the National Water Council (with the rank of Minister)

Ion Badea (March 29, 1985 - December 22, 1989)

- President of the State Committee for Nuclear Energy (with the rank of Minister)

Cornel Mihulecea (March 29, 1985 - December 22, 1989)

- President of the National Union of Agricultural Production Cooperatives (with the rank of Minister)

Vasile Marin (March 29, 1985 - December 22, 1989)

- President of the Department of Cults (with the rank of Minister)

Ion Cumpănașu (March 29, 1985 - December 22, 1989)

== Sources ==
- Stelian Neagoe, Oameni politici români, Editura Machiavelli, Bucharest, 2007, ISBN 973-99321-7-7
- Naomi Roht-Arriaza, Impunity and Human Rights in International Law and Practice, Oxford University Press US, 1995, ISBN 0-19-508136-6

Preceded by Dăscălescu I Cabinet	Cabinet of Romania; March 29, 1985 - December 22, 1989	Succeeded by First Roman cabinet
