= 1938 Constitution of Romania =

Constitution of Romania
- Created: 20 February 1938
- Ratified: 27 February 1938
- Author(s): Istrate Micescu
- Signatories: Carol II
- Purpose: Replace the 1923 Constitution

The 1938 Constitution of Romania was the fundamental law of Romania from the time of its adoption until 1940. It formed the legal basis for the royal dictatorship of King Carol II. It replaced the 1923 Constitution.

== History ==
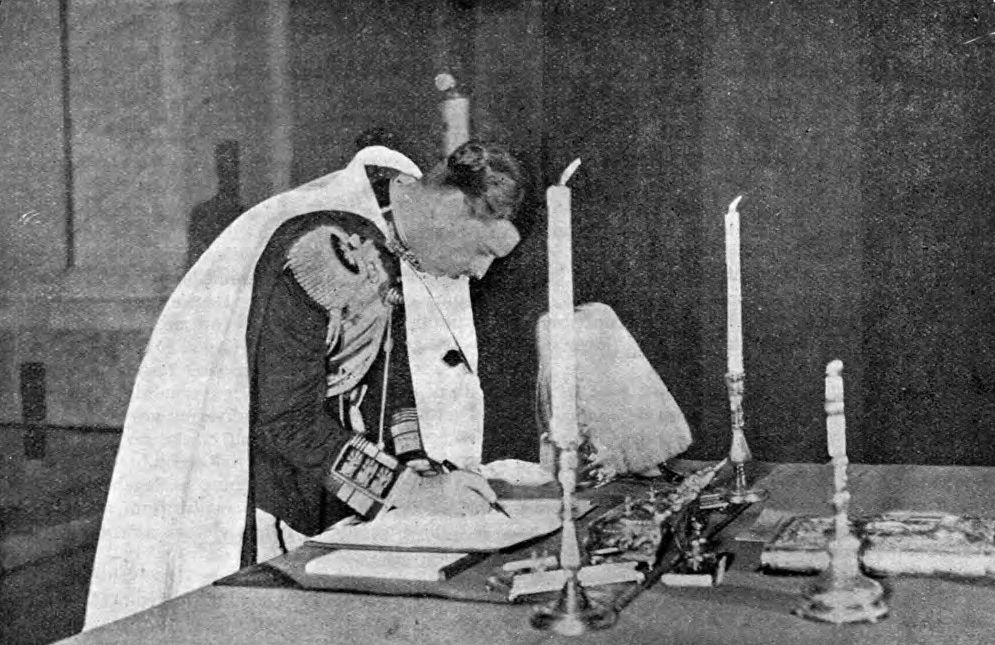
King Carol II signing the Constitution on 27 February 1938

King Carol engineered a self-coup on 10 February 1938 and seized emergency powers. Soon afterward university professor Istrate Micescu began working on a new constitution, based on suggestions from the King. Micescu's draft was made public on 20 February.

Four days later, voters were obliged to appear before their local election bureaus and vote verbally (“yes” or “no”) on the charter. Of 4,303,064 who voted, 4,297,581 (99.87%) approved with only 5,483 (0.13%) voting against; silence was deemed to be approval. The constitution was promulgated on 27 February and published in Monitorul Oficial the next day.

== Provisions ==
The document, comprising eight titles and 100 articles, was superficially similar to its predecessor. In practice, however, it was severely authoritarian and corporatist in nature. It codified Carol's emergency powers, turning his reign into a legal dictatorship. It abandoned the principle of separation of powers in favour of royal supremacy. This created a power structure similar to Alexander I of Yugoslavia's royal dictatorship of the previous decade. The rights and freedoms codified in the 1923 Constitution were swept away, at least in practice, by provisions that banned "revolutionary propaganda."

The king exercised legislative power through a Parliament elected according to corporatist principles. He exercised executive power through a government that he appointed and dismissed without parliamentary involvement. He could dissolve Parliament at any time and rule by decree, and was the sole person empowered to amend the Constitution.

As with the 1923 Constitution, Parliament was bicameral. The lower house, the Assembly of Deputies, was to be elected every six years and composed of members of the following professional categories: agriculture and manual labour; industry and commerce; intellectual occupations.

Deputies were elected in single-member districts, by secret and compulsory ballot; districts were drawn so as to assure adequate representation based on voters’ professions. The upper house, the Senate, was composed of members appointed by the King, members by right and members elected in single districts (in the same manner as Assembly members). The proportion of appointed and elected members was equal, while senators by right had to meet the same conditions as set out in the 1923 Constitution. Appointed and elected senators had nine-year terms, while one-third of senators’ terms were renewed every three years.

In December, the National Renaissance Front was formed as the only legally permitted party.

== Suspension ==
On 5 September 1940, King Carol signed a decree, titled “For the investment with full powers of the president of the Council of Ministers and the restriction of royal prerogatives”, which transferred his authoritarian powers to General Ion Antonescu. The 1938 Constitution was suspended and parliament dissolved. Antonescu formed the National Legionary State in alliance with the Iron Guard. He did not convene a parliament and ruled the country by decree even after breaking his alliance with the Guard in 1941.

King Michael ousted Antonescu on 23 August 1944, and a constitutional and transitional regime was established until a Constituent Assembly could meet to draft a new constitution, until which time a few provisions of the cancelled 1866 and 1923 constitutions were applied.

On 15 July 1946, the Petru Groza government issued a decree that bore a constitutional character, which abolished the Senate and established a unicameral system (the Assembly of Deputies) and granted universal suffrage to all citizens over 21, including women.

On 30 December 1947, after King Michael’s abdication, Parliament adopted a constitutional law that proclaimed the Romanian People’s Republic and abrogated “the Constitution of 1866 as modified on 29 March 1923 and 1 September 1944”.

Until the 1948 Constitution was adopted, legislative power was in the hands of the Assembly of Deputies that met following the 1946 elections, while the executive was composed of a five-member presidium elected by the Assembly: Constantin Ion Parhon, Mihail Sadoveanu, Ştefan Voitec, Ion Niculi and Gheorghe Stere.

== See also ==
- Parliament of Romania
