= Socialist Workers Party of Romania =

Socialist Workers Party of Romania Partidul Socialist al Muncitorilor din România
- Abbreviation: PSMR
- Founders: Leon Ghelerter, Ştefan Voitec, Vasile Anagnoste, Zaharia Tănase
- Founded: 15 July 1928
- Dissolved: 1933
- Split from: Social Democratic Party
- Succeeded by: (Renamed) Independent Socialist Party of Romania; Later the merged with Socialist Party of Romania
- Ideology: Socialism; Marxism

The Socialist Workers Party of Romania (Romanian: Partidul Socialist al Muncitorilor din România, PSMR), later renamed the Independent Socialist Party of Romania (Partidul Socialist Independent din România, PSIR), was a political party in Romania. The party was founded in Bucharest on 15 July 1928, as a leftist splinter group of the Social Democratic Party, formed by a minority that opposed the cooperation with the National Peasants' Party.

== Background ==
Following the decision of the May 1922 Congress of the Socialist Party of Romania (PSR) to unconditionally affiliate to the Communist International (Comintern), the Romanian authorities arrested en masse its leadership, accused of conspiracy against state security. The supporters of the unconditional affiliation reformed themselves as the Socialist Communist Party, with PSR members which had only supported an affiliation preserving party autonomy either leaving or being expelled at the request of the Comintern. The latter group, known as "unitarian", created a new Socialist Party of Romania (PS) in early 1922, after some of its leaders were freed from detention. While initially adopting the radical 1919 program of the PSR, the party toned down its rhetoric after joining the minor Social Democratic Party in August 1922, to constitute the Romanian Old Kingdom section of the Federation of Romanian Socialist Parties (FPSR). The Federation had been constituted in June 1921 by the reformist groups that had left the original PSR in early February, dissatisfied with the growing strength of the communist faction.

Unlike the Transylvanian and Bukovina sections of the FPSR, the Socialist Party of the Old Kingdom maintained a more leftist orientation, being more open to cooperation with the Communist Party of Romania (PCdR). Thus, the Bucharest section successfully ran in the 1925 local elections on a common list with the Peasant Workers' Bloc, a front organization of the PCdR – the latter having been banned by the Romanian government in 1924. The transformation of the FPSR into the Social Democratic Party of Romania (PSDR) in 1927 however meant the loss of PS’s autonomy, with decisions on electoral alliances falling within the competence of the national leadership.

== Foundation ==
During early 1928, the PSDR decision to run on a common platform with the centre-left National Peasants' Party (PNŢ) against the ruling National Liberal Party (PNL), and its ban on local collaboration with communist-influenced organisations, resulted in tensions between the central leadership and the Bucharest section. After calls to subordination issued in March–April were ignored, the direct confrontation that took place in May between Lothar Rădăceanu, Ilie Moscovici, and Ioan Flueraş, representing the Executive Committee, on one side, and the local leaders Leon Ghelerter, Ştefan Voitec, Vasile Anagnoste, and Zaharia Tănase, on the other side, only served to heighten the conflict. Consequently, the Executive Committee dissolved the leadership of the Bucharest section at the end of May. Furthermore, Ghelerter, himself a member of the Executive Committee, was expelled from the PSDR in July, accused of criticising the alliance with the Peasants' Party as well as protecting and encouraging communist elements within his section.

On July 15, 1928, a day after the PSDR appointed a new leadership for its Bucharest section, Ghelerter called on a meeting of his supporters. In the presence of a large number of former members of the section, as well as representatives from major industrial centres from the Old Kingdom, the meeting adopted a manifesto authored by Ghelerter, Voitec and Petre Zissu. The manifesto announced the creation of the Socialist Workers' Party as a party dedicated to social revolution, opposed to any collaboration with bourgeois parties, seen as supporters of the class-based society. Affirming its commitment to class struggle, it called on the peasantry to follow the lead of the working class in its struggle with capitalism, whose foremost representative in Romania was considered the National Liberal Party. The document further condemned PSDR's collaboration with the Peasants' Party, and criticised its position asserting social revolution would be possible in Romania only after the success of socialism in Western Europe. At the same meeting, a Committee of the Bucharest section was elected and tasked to work with militants from Ploieşti, Galaţi, Câmpina, and Botoşani towards calling a country-wide Congress.

== Activities ==
Expressing its adherence to Marxist doctrines, the PSMR called for peace between Romania and the Soviet Union. As the world financial crisis of 1929 wreaked havoc, the party argued that the time was ripe for revolution. It also called for end to censorship and repression and advocated salary increases, collective bargaining agreements and the 8 hour working day. Moreover, it favoured land reform, expropriating lands from large landowners without compensation.

The party slowly expanded its territorial base, already at the end of July 1928 enrolling the support of groups of workers from Galaţi, Iaşi and Ploieşti. Nevertheless, it was never able to establish a significant presence in the territories incorporated in Romania in the aftermath of World War I. For most of its existence, its main strongholds were Bucharest and the Prahova Valley, an important industrial region in southern Romania. Soon after foundation, the PSMR was also joined by other important figures from the PSDR, the Peasant Workers' Bloc and the local trade unions, such as Constantin Mănescu, Dumitru Gănescu or Iancu Iliescu.

The party was led by a Central Executive Committee. Litman Ghelerter served as the chairman of the party. Ștefan Voitec was the secretary of the party. Other key leaders of the party included Zaharia Tănase, Vasile Anagnoste, C. Mănescu and Mihail Moraru. Geographically the party was divided in county-level federations, each consisting of a number of local sections. The party organized a number of independent trade unions. In 1929 the party joined the Paris-based International Bureau of Revolutionary Socialist Parties. The central organ of the party was the newspaper Proletarul, which began publishing on July 29, 1928.

In preparation for the 1928 general election, the PSM extended an official invitation for cooperation to the Peasant Workers' Bloc, calling for the creation of a united front. Some of the party's leaders were ready to accept the Bloc's programme, however the latter required that they publicly repudiate the PSM as "centrist" and "social democratic". Despite its claimed independence, the decision of the communist-dominated Bloc to forego an alliance with the socialists mirrored the Comintern ban on collaboration with social-democrats imposed on the French and English communist parties, instituted in February 1928. Nevertheless, the PSM decided not to designate candidates, and called on supporters to vote for the Bloc's list. During the campaign, the party called for unification of the trade union movement. With its campaigning severely curtailed by the PNŢ-led government, the socialists-supported Bloc was only able to obtain 1.4% of the national vote. In contrast, the PNŢ in alliance with the PSDR obtained 77.76%, resulting in 9 MP seats for the Social-Democrats. After the Bloc refused another alliance offer, the PSMR, unable to raise sufficient funds, decided not to participate in the local elections of 1930, calling the workers to cancel their vote by writing "Down with the terror! Long live Bujor! Long live Socialism!" on their ballot.

PSMR held a conference in Câmpina September 26–27, 1931, at which the name of the party was changed to the Independent Socialist Party of Romania (P.S.I.R).

On August 24, 1933 PSIR merged with the Socialist Party of Romania (C. Popovici), a splinter group of Social Democratic Party, forming the United Socialist Party.
