= Constantin Ion Parhon =

Romanian endocrinologist and politician (1874–1969)

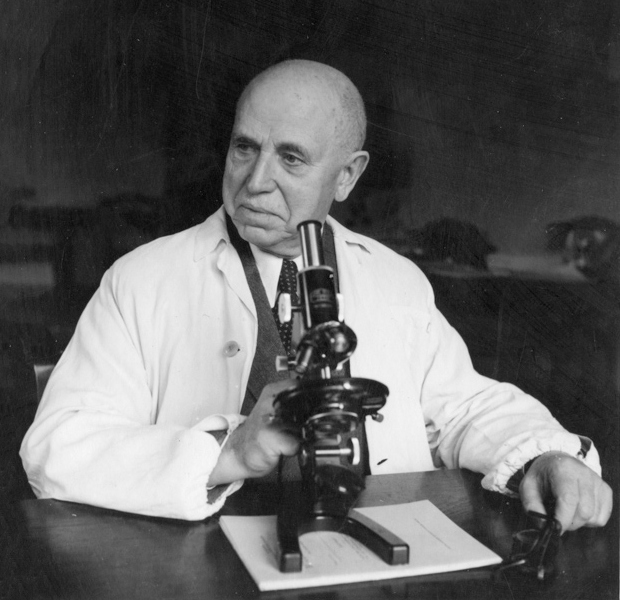

President of the Provisional Presidium of the Republic
- In office 30 December 1947 – 13 April 1948
- Preceded by: Position established Michael I (as King of Romania)
- Succeeded by: Himself (as President of the Presidium of the Great National Assembly)

President of the Presidium of the Great National Assembly
- In office 13 April 1948 – 12 June 1952
- Preceded by: Himself (as President of the Provisional Presidium of the Republic)
- Succeeded by: Petru Groza

Member of the Great National Assembly
- In office 1948–1961

Member of the Assembly of Deputies
- In office 19 November 1946 – 25 February 1948

Personal details
- Born: 15 October 1874 Câmpulung, Argeș County, United Principalities
- Died: 9 August 1969 (aged 94) Bucharest, Socialist Republic of Romania
- Resting place: Carol Park, Bucharest, Romania (until 1991)
- Party: Peasants' Party (1919–1921); Romanian Communist Party (1921–1969)
- Education: University of Bucharest
- Profession: Physician, Professor, Politician
- Awards: Hero of Socialist Labour
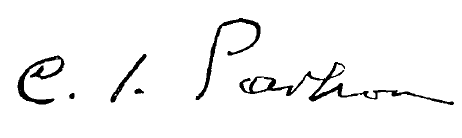
- Signature
- Scientific career
- Workplaces: University of Iași; Carol Davila University of Medicine and Pharmacy

Constantin Ion Parhon (Romanian pronunciation: [konstanˈtin iˈon parˈhon]; 15 October 1874 – 9 August 1969) was a Romanian neuropsychiatrist, endocrinologist and politician. He was the first head of state of the Romanian People's Republic from 1947 to 1952. Parhon was President of the Physicians and Naturalists Society in Iași, director of medical institutes, professor, and a titular member of the Romanian Academy.

== Early life and education ==
He was born in Câmpulung to the schoolteacher Ioan Parhon and his wife Maria (née Bauer). His father was originally from Cetatea de Baltă (today Alba County, formerly Târnava-Mică County). He started his secondary studies in Focșani and at the Bogdan Petriceicu Hasdeu High School in Buzău, and completed them at the Saints Peter and Paul High School in Ploiești, obtaining his baccalaureate in 1892.

Parhon then went to Bucharest, where he studied medicine at the University of Bucharest from 1893 to 1900, when he obtained the scientific title of Doctor of Medicine with the thesis "Contributions to the study of vasomotor disorders in hemiplegia". During his studies, he worked as an external (1896–1897) and internal (1897–1900) hospitalist in Bucharest.

== Working career ==
After completing his studies and obtaining his doctorate, he worked as a doctor at the "Rallet" Rural Hospital in Dâmbovița County (1901–1902) and then as a secondary doctor at the Pantelimon Hospital (1903–1909). During this period, he became a professor at the Clinic for Nervous Diseases in Bucharest (1903), following a training course in Munich in 1906. He then became primary doctor at the Mărcuța Hospice (1909–1912).

He was employed in higher medical education, as a university professor of neurology and psychiatry at the Faculty of Medicine of the University of Iași (1913–1933) and of the endocrinology clinic at the Faculty of Medicine of the University of Bucharest (1933–1940 and 1944–1958).

Parhon was the founder of the Romanian school of endocrinology. In 1909, he co-authored with Moise Goldstein the first book on endocrinology, Secrețiile Interne ("Internal Secretions"). Later on, he published a Handbook of Endocrinology, co-written with Goldstein and Ștefan-Marius Milcu (3 volumes, 1945–1949). Parhon published over 400 titles, and was known for his encyclopaedic knowledge. Besides the afore-mentioned works, some of his other well-known works are Old Age and Its Treatment (1948), The Age Biology (1955), and Selected Works (5 volumes, 1954–1962). He was an honorary member of the Soviet, Bulgarian, and East German academies, as well as the Hungarian Academy of Sciences, as well as several foreign scientific societies. In 1948, he was awarded an honorary doctorate by the Charles University of Prague.

== Politics ==
As a socialist militant who, according to his own testimony, was influenced by the works of Karl Marx in his teens, Parhon was one of the founders of a Laborer Party (Partidul Muncitoresc), a short-lived group that fused into the left-wing Peasants' Party in 1919. A short while after the fusion, Parhon split with the group and became politically inclined toward the Romanian Communist Party.

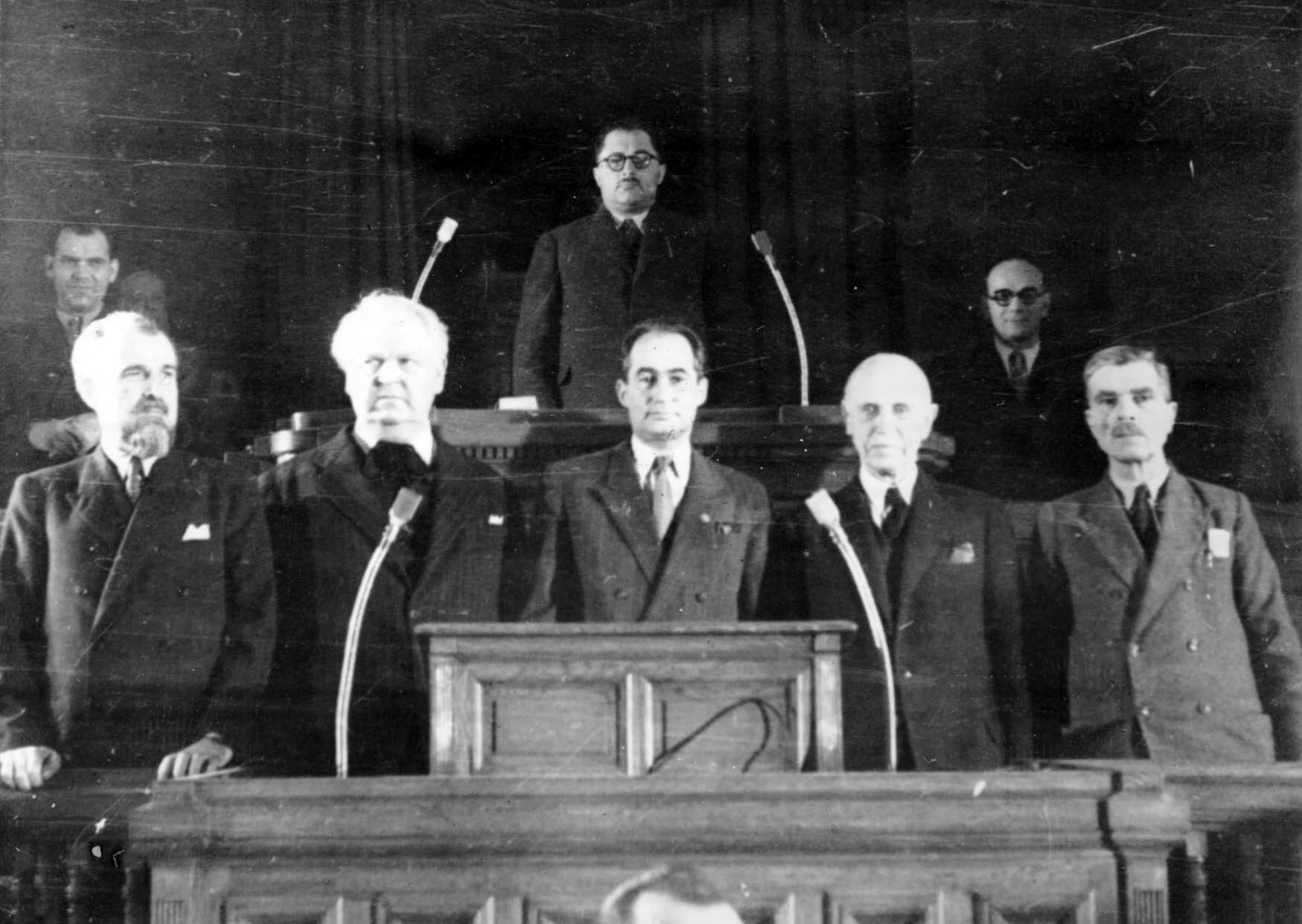
Presidium of the People's Republic of Romania (1948)

He allegedly protested against Romania's participation in World War II on the Axis side (see Romania during World War II), but, according to some sources, he was also a representative in Romania for the Reich-based chemical and pharmaceutical company Merck Darmstadt. In November 1944, after the 23 August coup d'état that led Romania to switch sides in the war and join the Allies, he became President of the Romanian Association for Strengthening the Ties with the Soviet Union, which had been founded at his villa in Sinaia. He was a deputy in Parliament (known as the Assembly of Deputies) and the Great National Assembly between 1946 and 1961. After the forced abdication of King Michael I on 30 December 1947, the Deputies' Assembly adopted Law No. 363, through which Romania became a People's Republic and the 1923 Constitution was repealed. The same law provided for a Presidium composed of five members (elected by the Deputies' Assembly) to exercise the executive powers in the state; alongside Parhon, its members were Mihail Sadoveanu, Ștefan Voitec, Gheorghe Stere, and Ion Niculi. Shortly afterwards, Parhon became the President of the Presidium, thus becoming Romania's head of state.

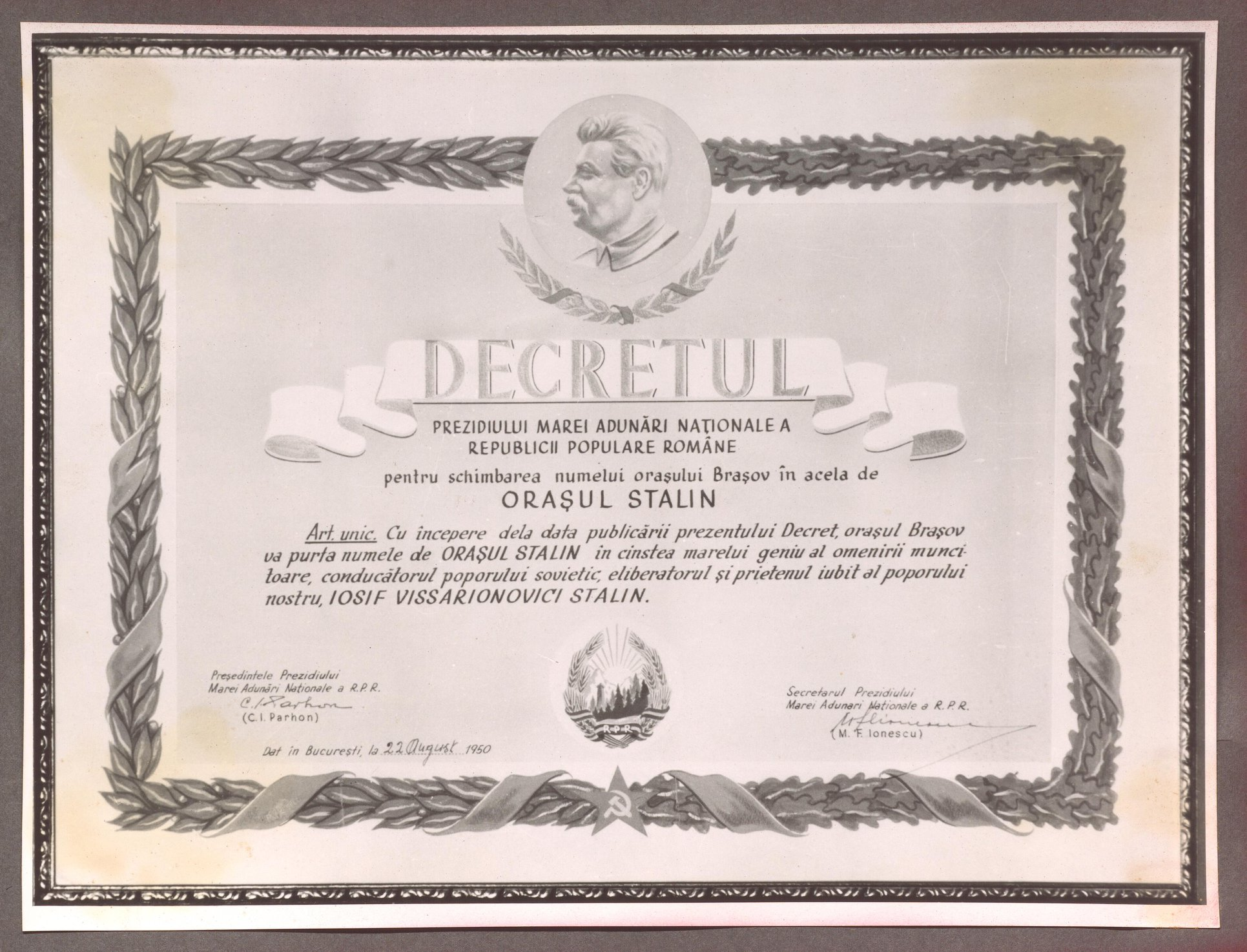
Decree by Parhon (co-signed by M.F. Ionescu) changing the name of Brașov to Stalin City

On 13 April 1948, the Parliament adopted a new Constitution, which borrowed heavily from the Soviet model of 1936 and entrusted the supreme powers to the Great National Assembly – which in turn elected a Presidium, composed of a president, three vice-presidents, a secretary and 14 members. The same day, Parhon was elected as President of the Presidium, though the real power in the state was exercised by the Romanian Workers' Party and its First Secretary, Gheorghe Gheorgiu-Dej. On 22 August 1950, he issued a decree (together with Marin Florea Ionescu) whereby Brașov was renamed Orașul Stalin (Stalin City), "in honor of the great genius of working humanity, the leader of the Soviet people, the liberator and beloved friend of our people, Joseph Vissarionovich Stalin."

Parhon was a member of the Romanian Academy and other scientific societies. He was awarded the title of Hero of Socialist Labor and received the State Prize. He liked to be referred to as a "citizen-scientist".

== Death ==
Parhon resigned from political office in June 1952, dedicating the rest of his life to scientific research. He was buried in the round hall of The Monument of the Heroes for the Freedom of the People and of the Motherland, for Socialism in Bucharest's Carol Park. In the aftermath of the Romanian Revolution of December 1989, his remains were exhumed in 1991, and interred in another cemetery.

== Legacy ==
He remained in public knowledge as Doctor Constantin I. Parhon, founder of the Romanian school of endocrinology, active full member and honorary president (1948–1969) of the Romanian Academy. Streets in Bârlad, Cornățelu, Mangalia, Mediaș, and Râmnicu Sărat are named in his honor, as is the Dr. C. I. Parhon Hospital in Iași.

== Notes ==
Party political offices
Preceded by Michael I as monarch of Romania	President of the Provisional Presidium of the Republic (1947–1948); President of the Presidium of the Great National Assembly (1948–1952); 30 December 1947 – 12 June 1952	Succeeded by Petru Groza
