= Proletarul (1928) =

Proletarul ('Proletarian') was a newspaper published in Romania between July 29, 1928 to May 1, 1935. It was the central organ of the Socialist Workers Party of Romania, later merged into the United Socialist Party. Ștefan Voitec was the editor of the newspaper.

Publication of Proletarul was suspended by the Romanian government in August 1935.
