= Magazin Istoric =

Romanian history magazine

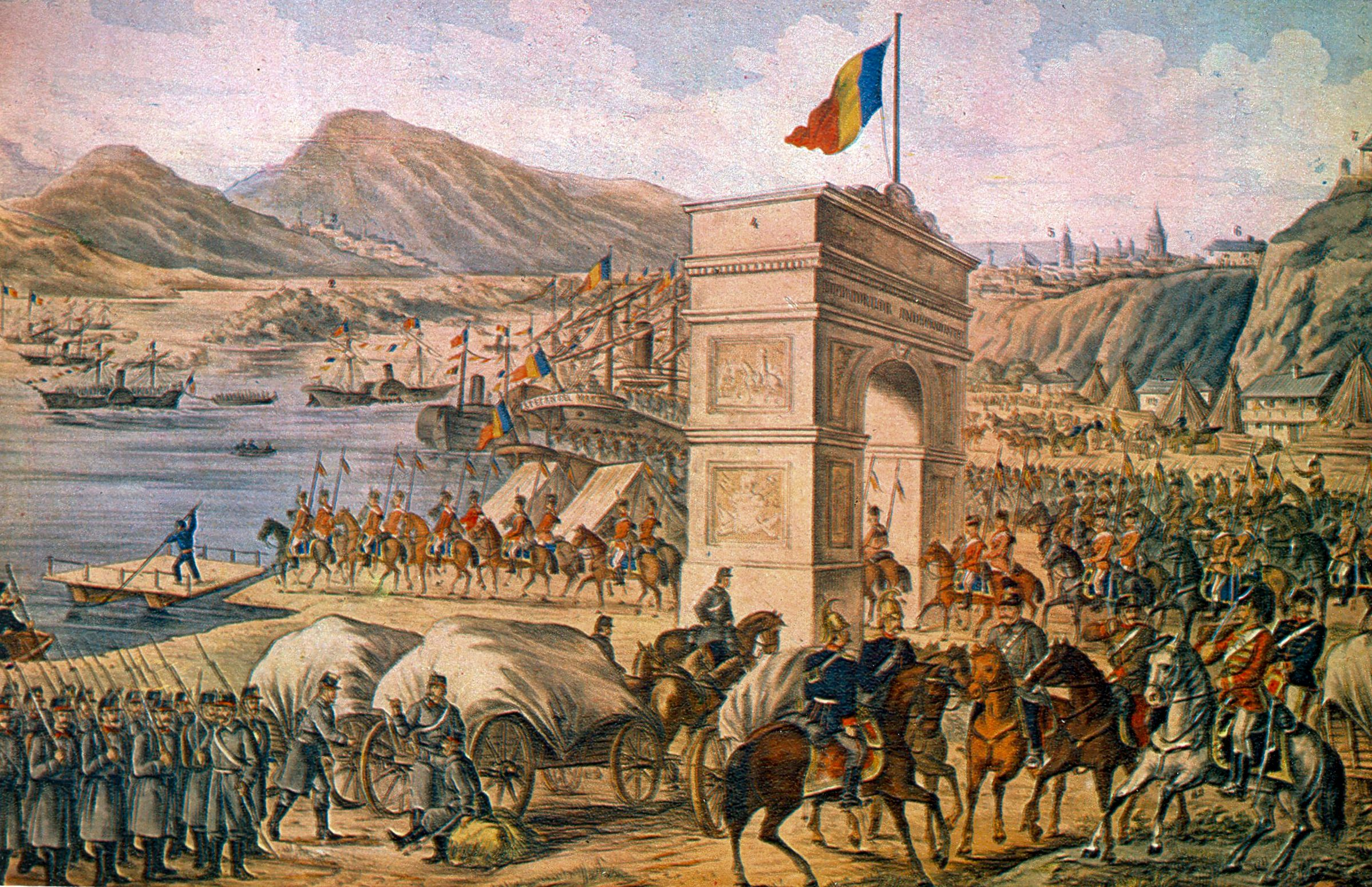
- Chromolithography on the cover of the first issue
- Categories: History magazine
- Frequency: Monthly
- First issue: April 1967
- Country: Romania
- Based in: Bucharest
- Language: Romanian
- Website: magazinistoric.ro
- ISSN: 0541-881X

Magazin Istoric (English: The Historical Magazine) is a Romanian monthly magazine.

== Overview ==
Magazin Istoric was started in 1967. The first issue appeared in April 1967. The headquarters is in Bucharest. The monthly magazine contains articles and pictures about Romanian history and world history. It is written in the Romanian language and on the last page contains a brief summary in English, French, Russian, German, and Spanish.

== History ==
Magazin Istoric was launched in 1967 with support from the Institute of Historical and Social-Political Studies in Bucharest, which functioned under the direct supervision of the Central Committee of the Romanian Communist Party. The first director was Dumitru Almaş (pseudonym of Dumitru Ailincăi, 1908–1995). The first chief redactor was Constantin Antip (born 27 October 1925) and chief editors were Ion Dragomirescu and Al. Gh. Savu (1931-1991). Redactors: Livia Dandara, Robert Deutsch, Mircea Ioanid, Gheorghe Rădulescu, Marian Ştefan, Răzvan Theodorescu. In 1969, Cristian Popişteanu (1932-1999) became director and Nicolae Minei (1922-2000) chief redactor.

Among the authors were: Ştefan Pascu, V. Vândea, Dan Berindei, Dionisie M. Pippidi, Constantin C. Giurescu, Radu Vulpe, Ştefan Ştefănescu, M.Petrecu-Dâmboviţa, Constantin N. Velichi, Vasile Netea, Ion Ionaşcu, Miron Constantinescu, Corina Nicolescu, I.M.Oprea, C. W. Ceram, Ion Vlăduţiu, Cristian Popişteanu, Eugen Preda, Camil Mureşanu, Anca Stahl, Florica Lorinţ, Augustin Deac, Aurelian Sacerdoţeanu and Al. Gh. Savu.

== Gallery ==
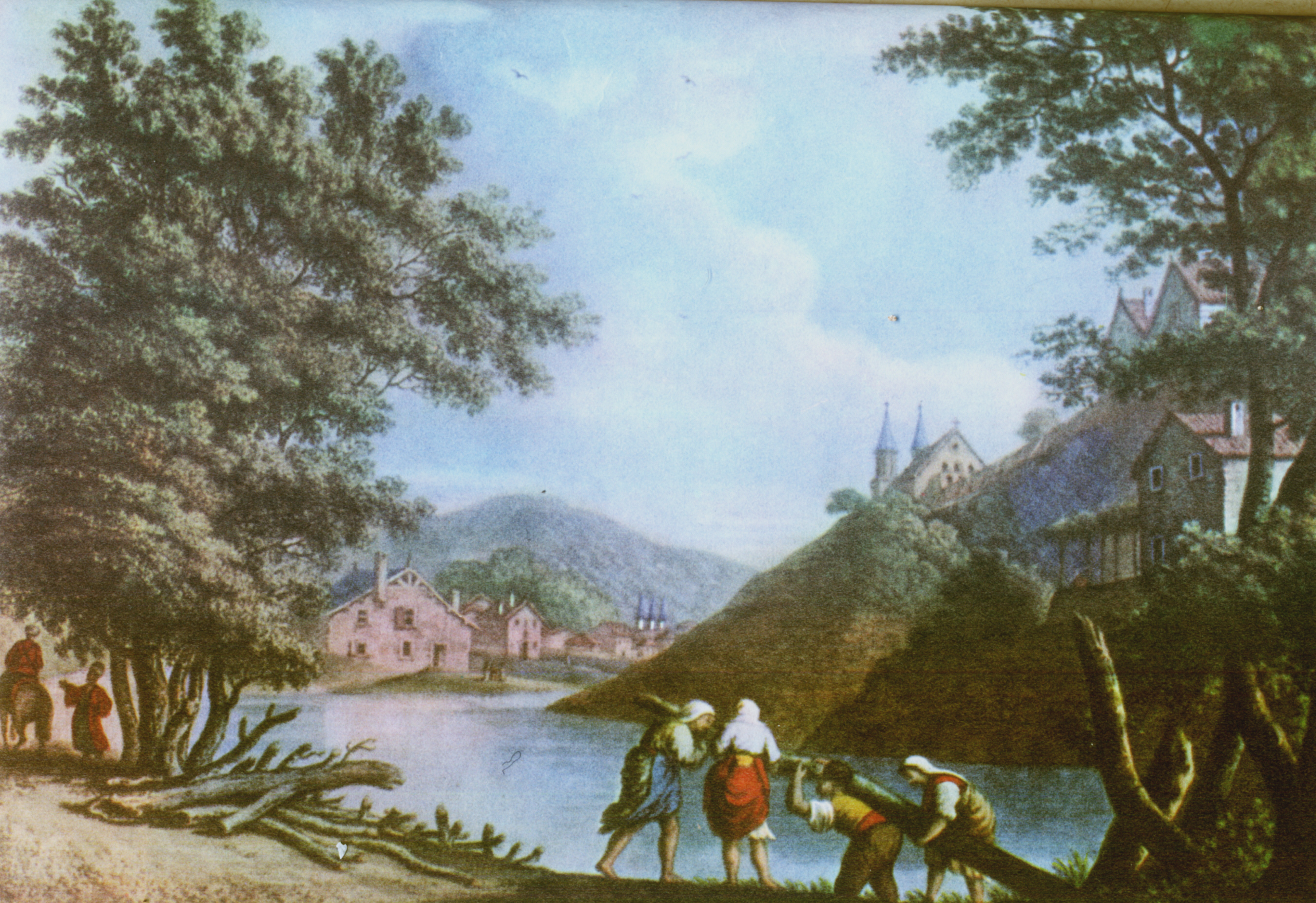
A picture from October 1967 issue

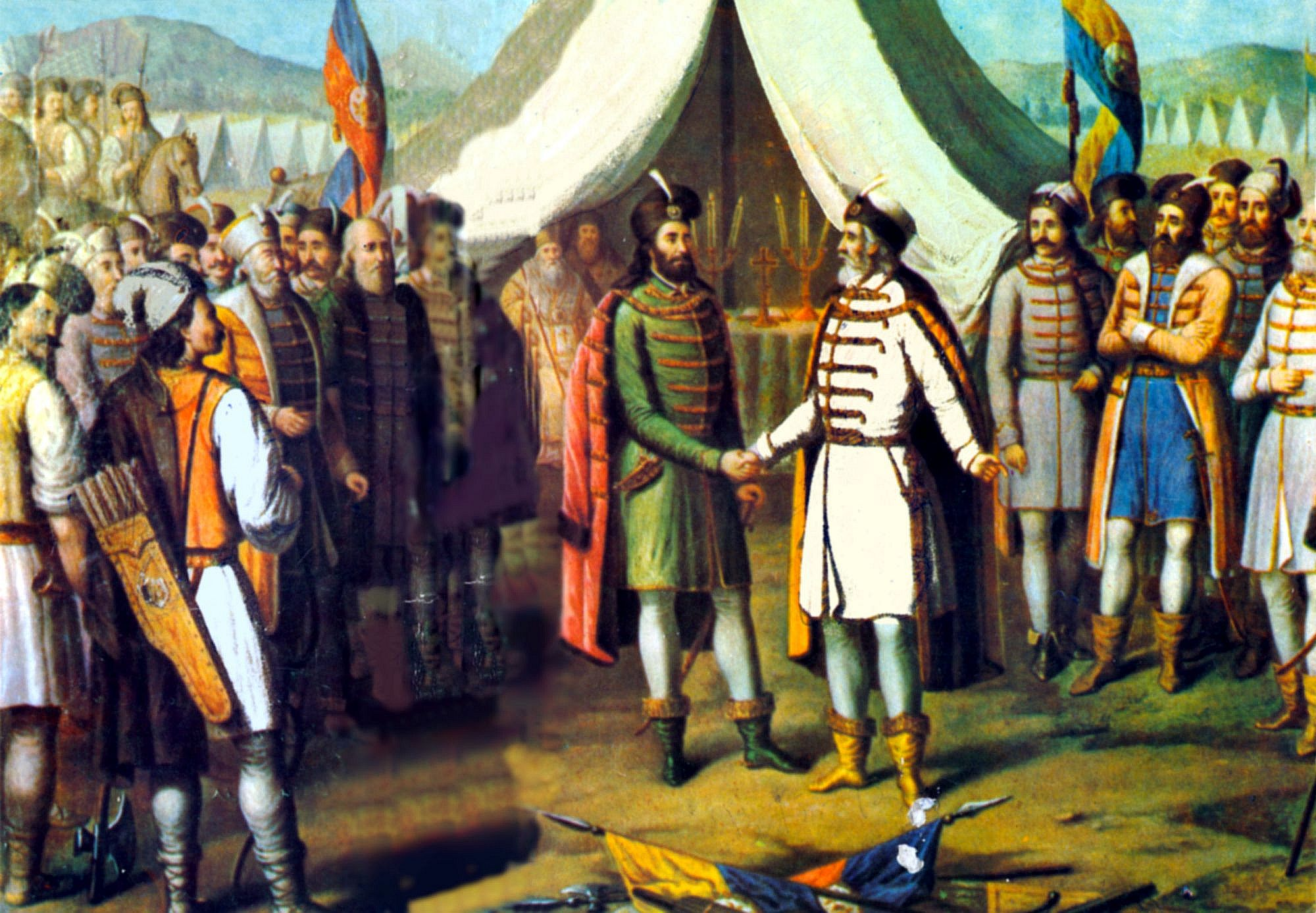
A picture from January 1968 issue
