= 1938 Romanian constitutional referendum =

24 February 1938
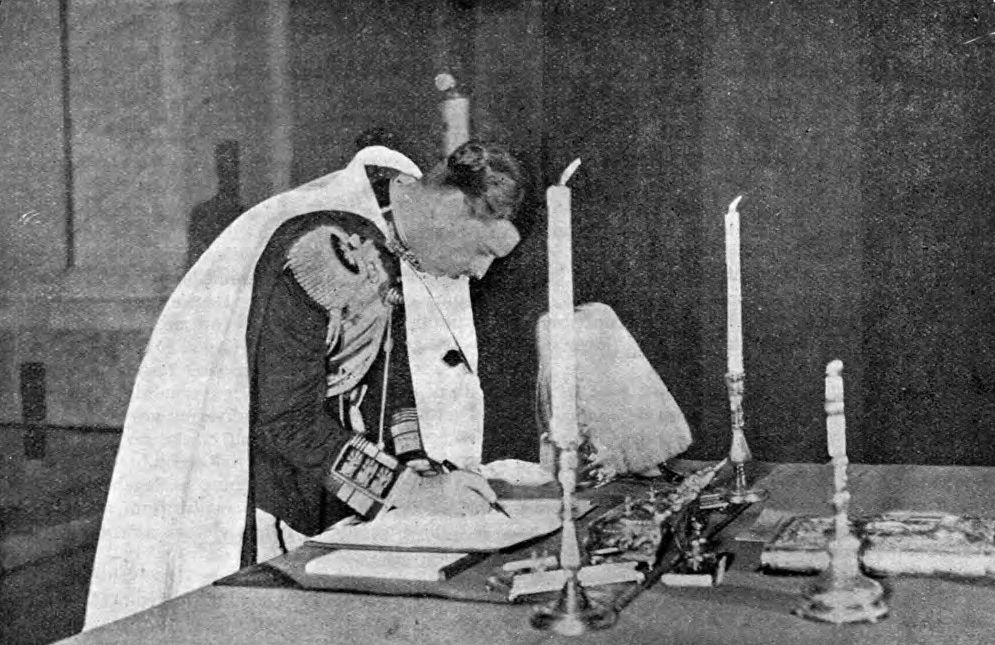
- King Carol II signing the new constitution

Results
Choice	Votes	%
Yes	4,297,581	99.87%
No	5,483	0.13%
Valid votes	4,303,064	100.00%
Invalid or blank votes	0	0.00%
Total votes	4,303,064	100.00%

A constitutional referendum was held in Romania on 24 February 1938 to approve a new constitution granting dictatorial powers to King Carol II. Voting was done by answering yes or no before an election bureau, with silence marked as yes. Voting was compulsory, and the amendments were approved by 99.87% of voters. The voting process has been described as deeply flawed and characterized by widespread intimidation.

== Background ==
The proposed changes to the constitution included:

- Giving the King the power to legislate and sole power to amend the constitution
- Making the government solely responsible to the King
- Allowing the King to dissolve Parliament at any time and rule by decree
- Limiting the Parliament to bringing in laws in the "national interest"
- Making the second chamber 50% appointed by the King and the remainder from professional organisations
- Raising the voting age from 21 to 30
- Prohibiting "revolutionary propaganda"

== Results ==
Choice	Votes	%
For	4,297,581	99.87
Against	5,483	0.13
Total	4,303,064	100.00
Valid votes	4,303,064	100.00
Invalid/blank votes	0	0.00
Total votes	4,303,064	100.00
Source: Direct Democracy
