= Unitary Socialist Party (Romania) =

Romanian political party

PSU electoral propaganda

The Unitary Socialist Party (Romanian: Partidul Socialist Unitar, abbreviated P.S.U.) was a political party in Romania, formed in 1933 through the merger of the Independent Socialist Party (PSI) and the Socialist Party (led by Constantin Popovici). PSU was a small party but played an important role within the left-wing movement, especially through its repeated attempts to promote unity between the Communist Party (PCR) and Social Democratic Party (PSD). PSU was affiliated with the London-based International Bureau of Revolutionary Socialist Unity.

== Towards the merger of Popovici and the Independent Socialists ==
The Socialist Party of Popovici held its party congress 11–12 March 1933. The final declaration of the congress called for working towards socialist unity on the basis of class struggle, and appealed for the formation of a 'Federation of the Social and Independent Socialist Parties' as an intermediary step towards merger of the two parties. After the Socialist Party congress, a meeting was held at the PSI headquarters at which a joint commission for the Federation was created—with C. Popovici, M. Radian, N. Bogatin and Florin Petrescu from the Popovici socialists and Ștefan Voitec, M. Raichman, Zaharia Tănase and C. Popescu from PSI.

== Foundation of PSU ==
PSU was founded on 24 August 1933 Dr. Leon Ghelerter became the party chairman, whilst Ștefan Voitec and Popovici were named general secretaries of the party. M. Radian became the treasurer of the party. Mihail Gheorghiu Bujor was invited by the party to address a mass rally in Bucharest at which the formation of the party was to be announced.

By the fall of 1933 PSU had three regional committees and 15 independent county-level committees (incl. Baia, Bacău, Cahul, Cernăuți, Cetatea Albă, Dâmbovița, Ilfov, Ismail, Neamț, Prahova, Sibiu and Tighina). Proletarul was the central press organ of the party. The Central Commission of Independent and United Trade Unions of Romania (Comisia Centrală de independență și unificare sindicală din România) functioned as the labour wing of the party.

== United Front politics ==
The party called for a 'united proletarian action front' against fascism, but rejected collaboration with bourgeois parties. Whilst technically legal PSU faced repression from state authorities. In November 1934 the liberal government banned the independent trade unions linked with PSU. Thereafter PSU relied on its youth wing (United Socialist Youth Union, Uniunea Tineretului Socialist Unitar) and women's wing (Labour Women's Union, Uniunea Femeilor Muncitoare) for political mobilization.

== Later period ==
Popovici was expelled in 1936, accused of being too close the Communist Party. After his expulsion from PSU, Popovici resurrected his Socialist Party.

By 1936, PSU was severely weakened - following the Popovici split, repression and financial difficulties. A general assembly of party members was convened in Bucharest on 3 May 1936 to assess the situation of the party. On 6 May 1936 a call was issued to all local branches to increase activities.

During 1937 PSU and PSD moved closed towards each other. By April 1937 there were speculations in the press of a possible merger of the two parties. The decisive move towards merger had been the shifts in the PSD and CGM (trade union) leaderships, whereby those sectors that were open to collaboration with the Goga–Cuza government were purged. The 1937 electoral campaign further strengthened the move towards PSD–PSU unity, as the two parties contested jointly. The PSD–PSU list did not win any seats, however. By early 1938 the remaining PSU cadres joined PSD, albeit there was no formal merger ceremony between the two parties.
