= Ion Niculi =

Romanian politician (1887–1979)

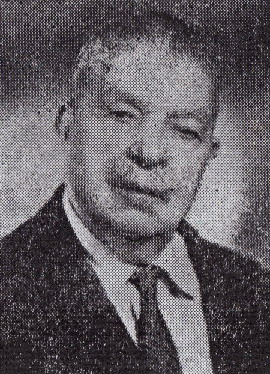

Personal details
- Born: January 25, 1897 Iași, Kingdom of Romania
- Died: July 31, 1979 (aged 82) Iași, Socialist Republic of Romania
- Resting place: Eternitatea Cemetery, Iași
- Party: Romanian Communist Party
- Awards: Hero of Socialist Labour

Ion Niculi (January 25, 1887 – July 31, 1979), Romanian communist politician, served as vice president of the Presidium of the Romanian People's Republic (1947–1948).

== Underground activist ==
Niculi was born in Iași to a working-class family. Early on he started as an apprentice, then becoming a typographer. Starting in 1912 he actively joined the labour movement, participating in many work-related actions by Iași typographers and textile workers.

In 1921, he joined the newly founded Romanian Communist Party (PCR), that was banned in 1924. Between 1923 and 1931, he served as secretary of the local workers' commission in Iași, affiliated with the General Council of Unitary Romanian Trade Unions. In this capacity, he represented Iași workers at congresses in Sibiu, Cluj, and Timișoara.

Between 1925 and 1933, he was active in the Workers and Peasants' Bloc, as well as in other organisations founded and run by the PCR. He had an important role in the demonstrations at the Iaşi People's House (set up between 1918 and 1921), in printing the newspaper Moldova Roşie ("Red Moldavia") in the nearby village of Vlădiceni, in obtaining important documents needed for underground work, as well as in the activity of other workers' and socialist organisations in Iași.

Because of the conspiratorial activity he undertook and of the leadership roles he held in Communist workers' organisations, Niculi was arrested numerous times and sentenced to prison, serving time in facilities for political prisoners at Galata, Chișinău, Doftana, and Târgu Jiu.

== Communist politician ==
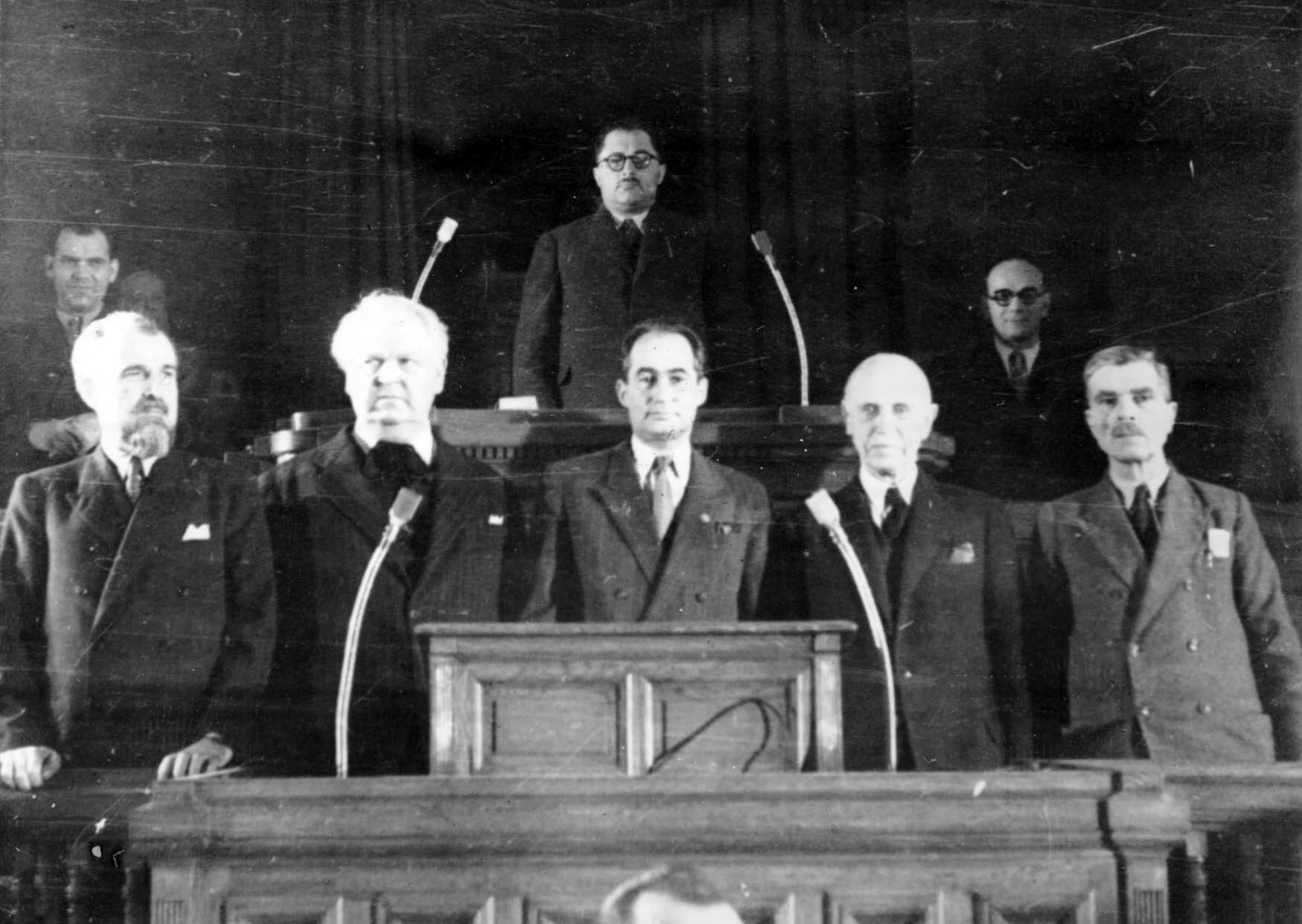
Presidium of the People's Republic of Romania in 1948: Ștefan Voitec, Mihail Sadoveanu, Gheorghe Stere, Constantin Ion Parhon, and Ion Niculi

After a coup overthrew Ion Antonescu's régime on August 23, 1944 (see Romania during World War II), he was given sensitive party and state posts. At the November 1946 election, he was elected a deputy for the PCR-led Bloc of Democratic Parties, serving as vice president of the Chamber of Deputies.

When the Romanian People's Republic was proclaimed on December 30, 1947, Niculi was elected member (vice president) of the Presidium of the Romanian People's Republic, serving from that date until April 13, 1948, alongside Constantin Ion Parhon, Mihail Sadoveanu, Ștefan Voitec, and Gheorghe Stere. For the first time in modern Romanian history, a worker shared the position of head of state.

A member of the regional Moldavian Committee of the PCR from 1946, in 1948 Niculi was elected a member of the Central Committee of the Romanian Workers' Party (as the PCR was now called). In 1955 he was elected a member of the party's Central Review Committee. From 1953 to 1956, he was president of the executive committee of the Popular Assembly of the city of Iaşi (a position equivalent to that of mayor).

In recognition of his merits, the Romanian Socialist Republic (as it was called from 1965) decorated Niculi with the important title "Hero of Socialist Labour", as well as with other orders and medals. Aged 92, he died in Iași in 1979, being buried in that city's Eternitatea Cemetery.
