= Lina Ciobanu =

Romanian politician

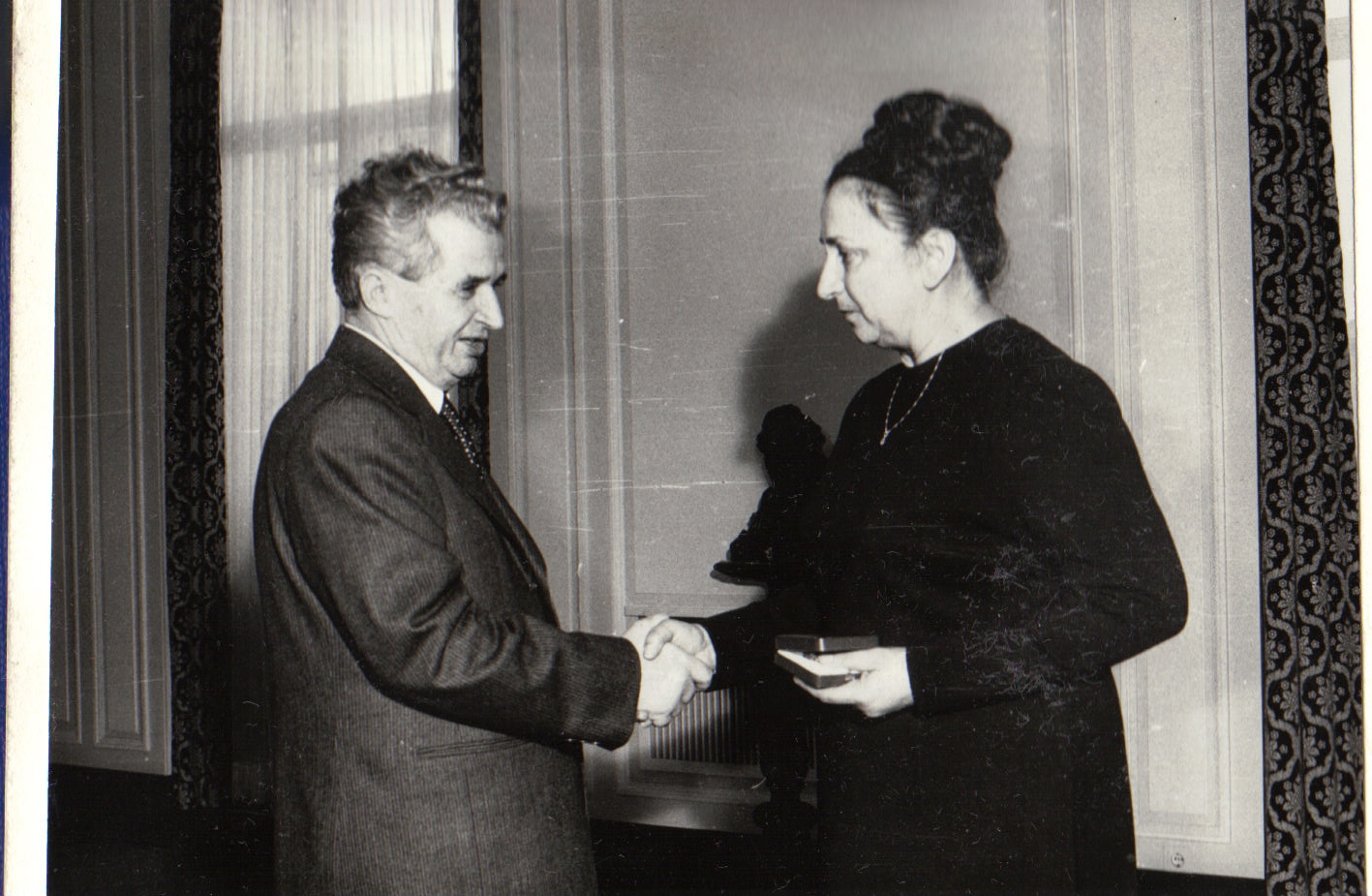
Nicolae Ceaușescu with Lina Ciobanu, 22 March 1979

Lina Ciobanu (born 22 March 1929) was a Romanian communist politician.

Ciobanu was born in Potcoava, a town in Olt County, the daughter of Gheorghe Năstase and Maria, née Gheorghe. In 1946 she moved to Bucharest, where she worked at a printing house and then at a textile factory, and married Ion Ciobanu. From 1957 to 1960 she was trained by the Romanian Communist Party (PCR) at the Ștefan Gheorghiu Academy and in 1965 she graduated from the Bucharest Academy of Economic Studies. In 1965 she became an alternate member of the Central Committee of the PCR, and from 1969 to 1989 she was a full member of the committee.

Ciobanu served as Minister of Light Industry from 1975 to 1987, and became a Member of the Politburo in 1977. From 1985 to 1989 she served as deputy for Pașcani in the Great National Assembly and from 1987 to 1989 she was Vice-President of the Council of Ministers. Her awards included the Order of the Star of the Romanian Socialist Republic, 4th class; the Order of Labor, 1st class; and the August 23 Order, 4th class.

In January 1990, right after the Romanian Revolution of December 1989, she was arrested. In April 1992 she was sentenced to 16 years for complicity in aggravated murder and to suppress the Revolution. Shortly after, she suffered from a stroke; in November 1996, she was pardoned by then-President Ion Iliescu, as he was about to leave office.
