= Aneta Spornic =

Romanian politician

Aneta Spornic (born 29 June 1930) was a Romanian communist politician.

She was born in Bucharest and studied from 1949 to 1954 at the Faculty of Law of the University of Bucharest. She joined the Romanian Communist Party in October 1956. From November 1975 to August 1979, she was Deputy Minister of Labour. She served as Minister of Education in 1979, having previously taught at the Academy of Economic Studies until 1977. She had also been the chair of the Bucharest Women's Committee. Spornic was Minister of Education and Instruction from 1979 to 1982. From 1982 to 1984, she held ministerial status on the State Planning Committee, before becoming President of the State Committee on Prices. She was awarded the Order of Labor, 3rd class and the Order of the Star of the Romanian Socialist Republic, 4th class. From 30 December 1987 to 23 February 1990 she served as Romania's ambassador to Venezuela.
