= Alexandrina Găinușe =

Romanian politician

Alexandrina Găinușe (1932–2012) was a Romanian politician (Communist).

She served as Minister of Labour in 1986.
