= Augustin Deac =

Romanian writer and historian (1928–2004)

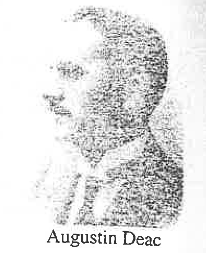
- Augustin Deac
- Born: 9 August 1928; Giurtelecu Şimleului (Transylvania, Romania)
- Died: 29 January 2004 (aged 75); Bucharest, Romania
- Education: University of Cluj; University of Bucharest
- Known for: Historical works
- Scientific career
- Fields: History, politics, pedagogy, philosophy
- Workplaces: University of Cluj; University of Bucharest

Augustin Deac (Romanian pronunciation: [awɡusˈtin ˈde̯ak]; 9 August 1928 – 29 January 2004) was a Romanian author and history professor.

== Biography ==
Augustin Deac was born in Giurtelecu Şimleului, Transylvania, into a Greek Catholic family. His early school years were at Şimleul Silvaniei and Zalău. He graduated from the Faculty of History and Archaeology, University of Cluj, as assistant to the academician Constantin Daicoviciu. He was awarded his doctorate at the University of Bucharest, where he was a lead researcher in the Institute of History and Political Studies.

Deac taught at several colleges and universities and published over 40 scientific papers and books. Augustin Deac brought a microfilm of the Rohonc Codex from Budapest, Hungary, to Romania, where it was studied by Viorica Enăchiuc.

== Major works ==
- Marea Unire (in Romanian)
- Revizionismul ungar - factor destabilizator in Europa (in Romanian)
- The History of the Historical Truth. Bucharest: Editura Tentant, 2001 Istoria Adevarului Istoric (in Romanian)
- Mosii si Stramosii Poporului Roman. (in Latin)
- Din istoria Ucrainei - "Tara de margine" (in Romanian)
- Pagini din istoria adevarata a Bulgariei (in Romanian)
- Mișcarea muncitorească din Transilvania 1890-1895 (in Romanian), Ed. Stiintifica, 1962.
- Mari crime împotriva națiunii române (in Romanian), Bucharest: Bravo Press, 1996, ISBN 973-97582-6-6.
- O mie noua sute şapte vazut peste hotare, Bucharest: Ed. Stiintifica, 1967.
