= Suzana Gâdea =

Romanian Communist apparatchik

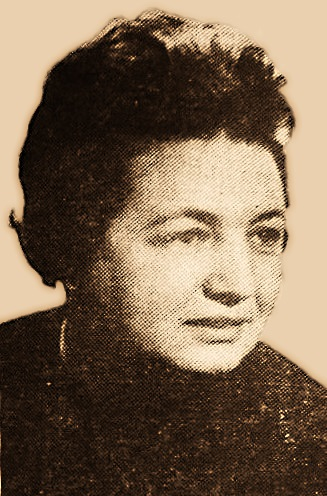
Photograph of Suzana Gâdea

Suzana Gâdea (1919–1996) was a Romanian Communist politician, who served as Minister of Education in 1976–1979 under the Ceaușescu regime. After the 1989 revolution, she was sentenced to eight years in jail.
