= 1923 Constitution of Romania =

Constitution of Romania
- Created: 1922 - 1923
- Ratified: 29 March 1923
- Signatories: Ferdinand I
- Purpose: Replace the 1866 Constitution

The 1923 Constitution of Romania, also called the Constitution of Union, was intended to align the organisation of the state on the basis of universal male suffrage and the new realities that arose after the Great Union of 1918.

== History ==
Four draft constitutions existed: one belonging to the National Liberal Party, written with contributions from Ion I. C. Brătianu; one composed by R. Boilă at Cluj, under the influence of the Romanian National Party; one by Constantin Stere, representing the views of the Peasants' Party; and a fourth by C. Berariu. Except for Stere's proposal, which involved a unicameral legislature, proportional representation and popular consultation through the plebiscite, the other three were inspired (when it came to political organisation) by the 1866 Constitution. The Liberals came to power in 1922 and managed to push through their own draft, which was approved 247–8 (with two abstentions) in the Chamber of Deputies on March 26, 1923, and the next day in the Senate, 137–2 (with two abstentions). It was published in Monitorul Oficial and came into force on March 29.

Although the constitution was very advanced and democratic in many respects, it also contained imperfections in the functioning of state institutions as was the case with its predecessor. For instance, the King appointed the president of the Council of Ministers, who then organised elections. The government was thus in a position to ensure that its party won a majority in the legislature. In a well-functioning democracy, a government represents the will of parliament and not vice versa, as generally happened in the interwar period. Carol II exploited these weaknesses to subvert democracy and set up a royal dictatorship in 1937.

The 1923 Constitution was abrogated when its February 1938 successor came into force. It was then partly revived after the coup of August 23, 1944, and definitively abrogated when Romania became a republic on December 30, 1947. During this latter period, in July 1946, the Senate was abolished—the only significant modification to the document.

== Content ==
The constitution had eight titles and 138 articles, of which 76 came in their entirety from its predecessor. It enshrined the principles of popular sovereignty (exercised through representatives), separation of powers in the state, rule of law and decentralisation. Rights and freedoms for all citizens were recognised, regardless of ethnicity, language, religion or social class; the right to own property was guaranteed and, for the first time, the nationalisation of mineral deposits was provided for. The Kingdom of Romania was defined as a "unitary and indivisible national state", with an inalienable territory. The state guaranteed freedom of expression and assembly, of conscience and of religion, and declared that "as the Romanian Orthodox Church is the religion of the great majority of Romanians it is the dominant church in the Romanian State, while the Greek-Catholic Church has primacy before other faiths."

=== Organisation of the state ===
Regarding state organisation, legislative power was entrusted to Parliament (Senate and Assembly of Deputies) and the King; executive power to the King, who delegated it to the Council of Ministers; and judicial power to the central and local judicial organs. The right to vote was expanded beyond the 1866 regulations: it was universal for all males, equal, direct, compulsory and secret, based on majority representation. The Assembly of Deputies was elected through universal suffrage, while the Senate comprised members elected by different electoral bodies (the Chambers of Commerce, Industry, Agriculture and Labour, and professors, all divided into separate colleges), and members by right: the heir to the throne; Metropolitan bishops; diocesan bishops of the Orthodox and Greek-Catholic churches; heads of state-recognised religious bodies; the president of the Romanian Academy; former presidents of the Council of Ministers; former ministers with at least six years’ seniority; former presidents of either legislative chamber who held this function for at least eight ordinary sessions; former senators and deputies elected to at least ten legislatures, irrespective of their duration; former presidents of the High Court of Cassation and Justice; reserve and retired generals; former presidents of the National Assemblies at Chişinău, Cernăuţi and Alba Iulia, which proclaimed their respective provinces’ union with Romania in 1918.

A special section discussing the King provides that the throne should remain with the House of Hohenzollern, "from male to male in order of primogeniture and with the perpetual exclusion of women and their descendants". The King's person was declared inviolable. As with the 1866 document, while the king was vested with executive power, he was not personally responsible for exercising it. Rather, responsibility rested with the ministers; all acts of the sovereign had to be countersigned by a minister, who then assumed political responsibility for it.
