= 1948 Romanian parliamentary election =

- 28 March 1948

All 414 seats in the Great National Assembly 208 seats needed for a majority
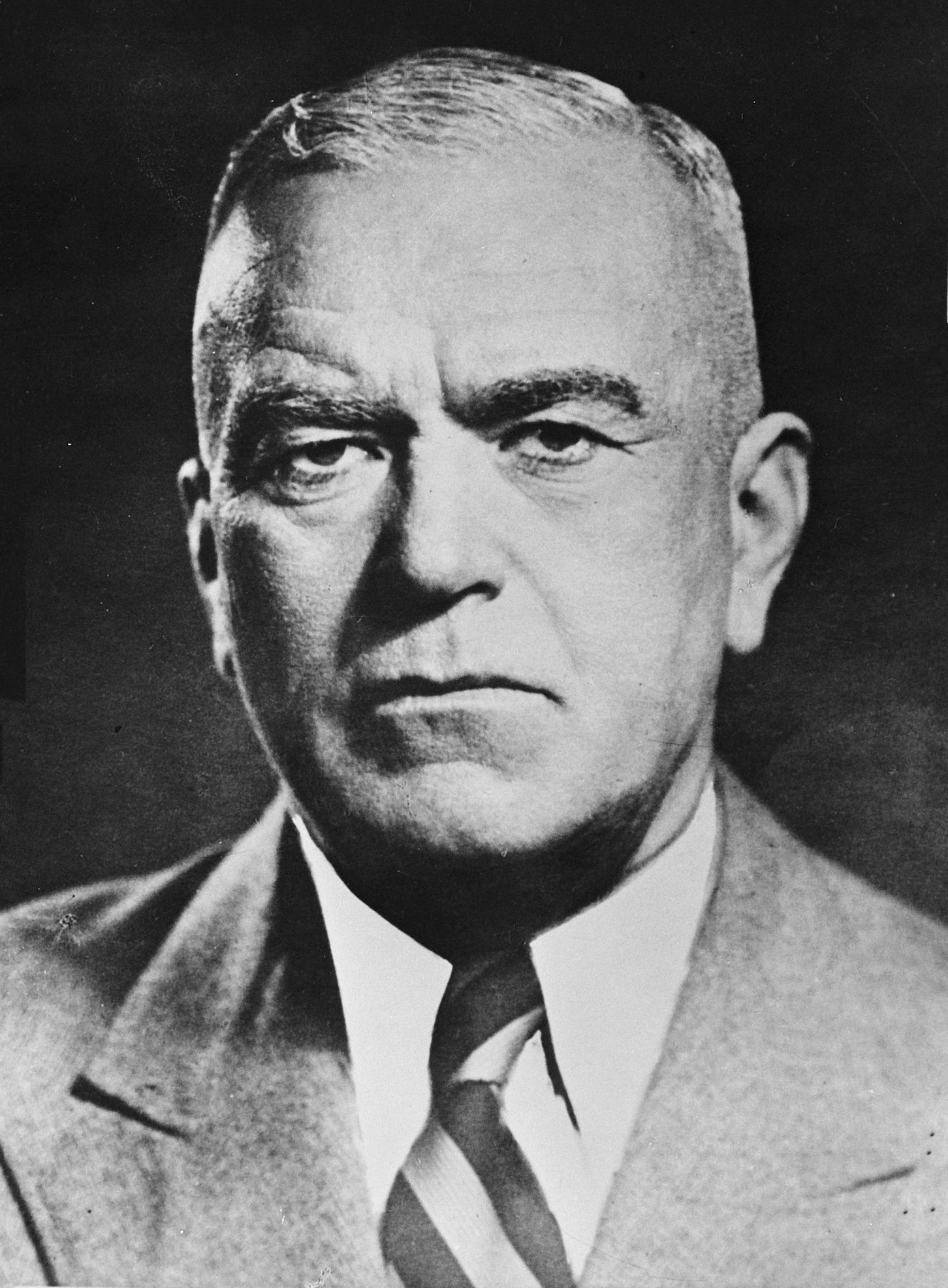

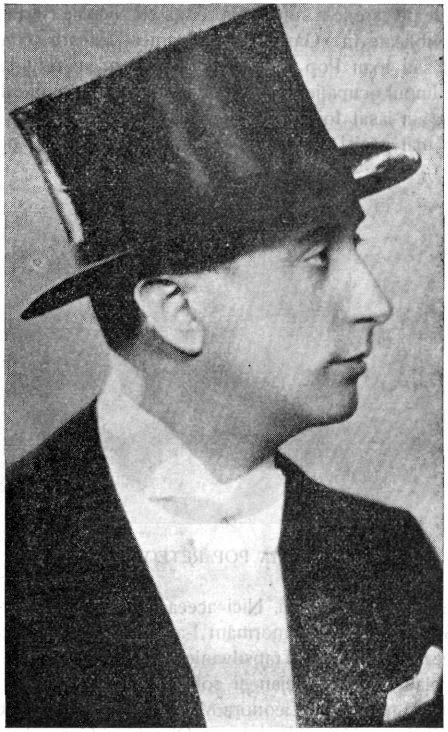

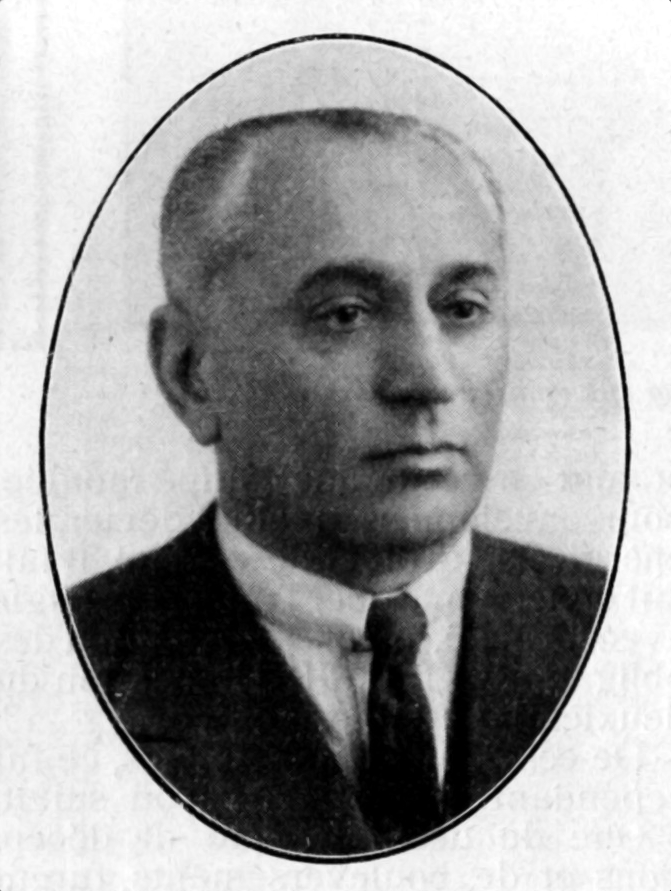
	First party	Second party	Third party
Leader	Petru Groza	Petre Bejan	Nicolae Lupu
Party	FP	PNL–Bejan	PȚD–Lupu
Alliance	FDP	–	–
Seats won	405	7	2
Seat change	▲133	▼68	0
Popular vote	6,959,936	212,438	50,532
Percentage	93.19%	2.84%	0.68%
Swing	▲23.42pp	N/A (Note: Was part of the Bloc of Democratic Parties in the 1946 elections.)	▼1.68pp
Prime Minister before election
Petru Groza
FP
Elected Prime Minister
Petru Groza
FP

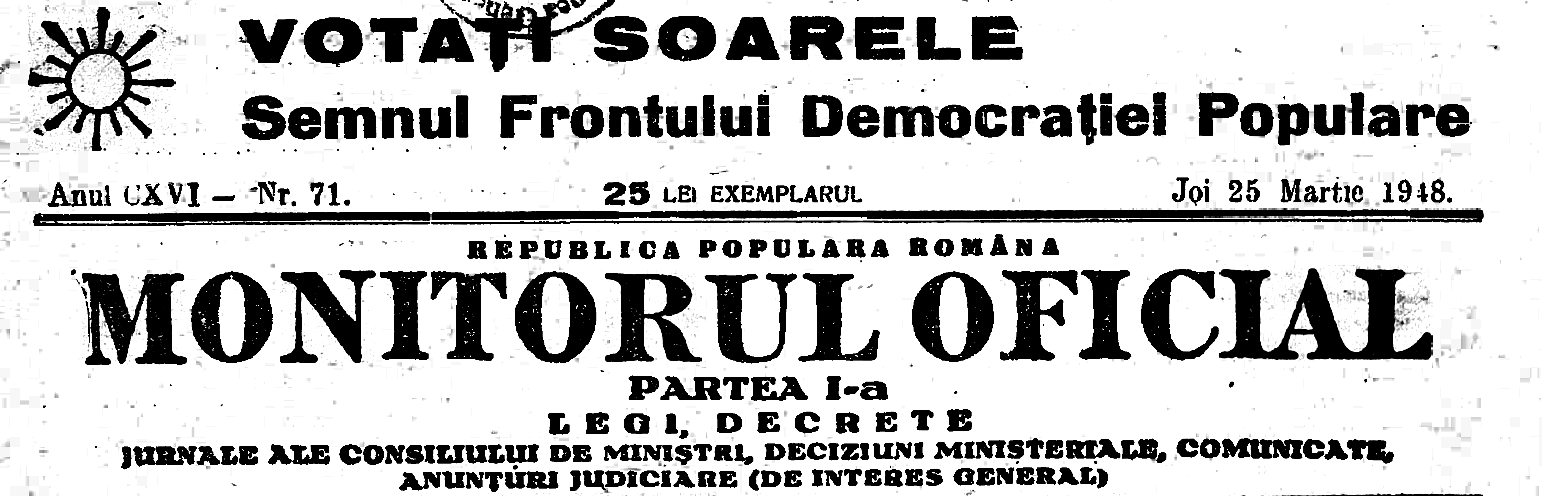
First page of Monitorul Oficial, official government gazette, having a Democratic People's Front ad

Parliamentary elections were held in Romania on 28 March 1948. They were the first elections held under communist rule; the communist-dominated parliament had declared Romania a people's republic after King Michael was forced to abdicate in December 1947.

With all meaningful opposition having been eliminated, the People's Democratic Front (FDP), dominated by the communist Romanian Workers Party (PMR) received 93.2% of the vote and won 405 of the 414 seats in the Great National Assembly. Within the Front, the PMR and its allies won a total of 201 seats, seven short of a majority in its own right. Rump liberal and peasant parties appeared on the ballot, between them receiving 3.5 percent of the vote and winning nine seats. Despite severe repression, this was the last election until 1990 where non-Communist opposition parties were nominally allowed to run or win seats.

== Background ==
In 1945, the Soviet Union all but forced King Michael to appoint Petru Groza as Prime Minister. Soviet emissary Andrei Vyshinsky had warned the king that he would be placing Romania's very existence at risk unless he complied. The following year, Groza's pro-Communist government oversaw an election that resulted in a parliament in which the Communist-dominated Bloc of Democratic Parties won over four-fifths of the seats (over 91 percent counting the BPD's allies). The election was far from free; Communist unions hindered delivery of opposition newspapers, and Communist operatives harassed opposition workers.

Over the next two years, the Communists, with Groza's help, consolidated their hold on the country. The turning point came in the second half of 1947, when the government initiated a campaign of harsh repression against the remaining opposition parties. The National Peasants' Party and National Liberal Party, the two largest opposition parties, were dissolved by the government. The National Peasants' leaders, Iuliu Maniu and Ion Mihalache, were tried on charges of plotting to overthrow the government in the Tămădău Affair, and were both sentenced to life imprisonment. On 30 December, Groza and Communist leader Gheorghe Gheorghiu-Dej confronted Michael and forced his abdication. Michael and his personal counselor would later claim this was done with the help of a detachment of troops from the pro-Communist Tudor Vladimirescu Division. Hours later, the Communist-dominated parliament abolished the monarchy and proclaimed Romania a "people's republic".

A month before the elections, the Communists and part of the Social Democrats merged to form the Romanian Workers' Party (PMR). However, Communists retained key posts in the merged party, and used the principle of democratic centralism to ensure that the Social Democratic half complied with the new order. The Social Democrats were gradually pushed out altogether, leaving the PMR as a renamed and enlarged PCR. At the same time, the National Democratic Front, an electoral alliance dominated by the PMR, was reorganized as the People's Democratic Front. The Front rapidly took on a character similar to other "national fronts" in the emerging Soviet bloc. The front's minor parties became completely subservient to the PMR, and had to accept the PMR's "leading role" as a condition of their continued existence. Despite this, Groza, leader of one of those minor parties, the Ploughmen's Front, remained prime minister.

== Results ==
Party or alliance		Votes	%	Seats
People's Democratic Front	Romanian Workers Party	6,959,936	93.19	190
People's Democratic Front	Ploughmen's Front	6,959,936	93.19	126
People's Democratic Front	National Popular Party	6,959,936	93.19	43
People's Democratic Front	Hungarian People's Union	6,959,936	93.19	30
People's Democratic Front	PMR affiliates	6,959,936	93.19	11
People's Democratic Front	Jewish Democratic Committee	6,959,936	93.19	5
National Liberal Party–Bejan		212,438	2.84	7
Democratic Peasants' Party		50,532	0.68	2
Independents		245,635	3.29	0
Total		7,468,541	100.00	414
Valid votes		7,468,541	97.49	
Invalid/blank votes		192,490	2.51	
Total votes		7,661,031	100.00	
Registered voters/turnout		8,399,416	91.21	
Source: Nohlen & Stöver, Preda

== Aftermath ==
A month after the elections, the GNA, now a pliant rubber stamp of the communists, adopted a new constitution. While state power was nominally derived from the will of the people through the GNA, in practice it was exercised by the PMR, which itself was closely supervised by the Kremlin. Soon afterwards, all parties outside the FDP ceased to exist, though Romania had effectively been a single-party state since the monarchy was abolished in December 1947.
