= Romanian Social Democratic Party (1927–1948) =

Romanian Social Democratic Party Partidul Social Democrat Român
- Abbreviation: PSDR
- Founded: 1927
- Dissolved: 1948
- Preceded by: Federation of Socialist Parties from Romania
- Merged into: Romanian Workers' Party
- Succeeded by: Romanian Social Democratic Party (claimed, not the legal successor)
- Women's wing: Working Women's Union
- Ideology: Social democracy Democratic socialism Factions: Anti-communism
- Political position: Centre-left to Left-wing
- International affiliation: Labour and Socialist International
- Colors: Red

The Romanian Social Democratic Party (Romanian: Partidul Social Democrat Român, or Partidul Social Democrat, PSD) was a social-democratic political party in Romania. In the early 1920s, the Socialist Party of Romania split over the issue of affiliation with the Third International. The majority, which supported affiliation, evolved into the Communist Party of Romania in 1921, while the members who opposed the new orientation formed various political groupings, eventually reorganizing under a central leadership in 1927. From 1938 to 1944, the party was outlawed but remained active in clandestinity. After 1944, it allied with the Communists and eventually was forced to reunite with them to form the Workers' Party of Romania in 1948. It published the magazines Socialismul, Lumea Nouă, and Libertatea. After the end of the Communist single-party system in 1989, a group of former members created a new party which proclaimed itself the direct descendant of the PSD.

== Foundation and World War II ==
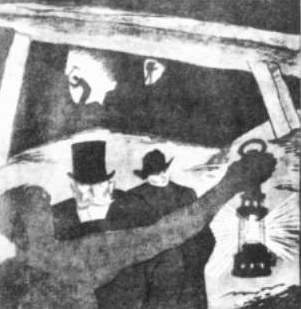
Criticism among socialist groups, as illustrated in a December 1922 caricature by Nicolae Tonitza. The mine owner to the miner: "A socialist, you say? My son is a socialist too, but without going on strike..., that is why he already has his own capital..."

The first organized party of the Romanian socialists, Romanian Social Democratic Workers' Party was founded in 1893, but was disbanded by the end of the decade after conflicts between the bourgeois leaders, who considered democratic reforms were possible only in alliance with the National Liberal Party, and the proletarian leaders and members, who wanted to continue as a strictly working class party. Lacking material means and organisational experience, the Marxists were only able to re-organise a socialist party in 1910, when the Social Democratic Party of Romania was founded. Outlawed during World War I, the party re-emerged in 1918 with a revolutionary programme, rebranding itself as the Socialist Party of Romania (PSR).

As following the war Romania acquired a large extent of new territories, the socialists toned down their objectives in order to accommodate the more reformist-minded Social Democratic Party of Transylvania and Banat and Social Democratic Party of Bukovina. Despite successive declarations in favour of uniting the three parties under a single central leadership, this objective was never completed, as the revolutionary and reformist factions came into open conflict. Unity projects where shattered after the social democrats, including most members of the Bukovina party, an important part of the Transylvanian party, and a minority in old Romania, broke from the party in February 1921, the moment it became clear that the communist faction had gained a majority in the central leadership. The majority of the PSR became increasingly favorable to the Bolshevik option, reforming itself as the Communist Party of Romania (PCdR, later PCR), in May 1921. A minority wing formed the Federation of Socialist Parties from Romania, which reformed as the Social Democratic Party in May 1927 and affiliated with the 2 1/2 International. The leader of the PSD in the following period was Constantin Titel Petrescu.

The party was a member of the Labour and Socialist International between 1923 and 1940.

Beginning with the late 1920s several groups left the party dissatisfied with what they perceived as the turn of the PSDR leadership to right-wing politics. Such groups included the Socialist Workers Party of Romania, founded in 1928 by a group around Leon Ghelerter (joined in 1931 by former communist leader Gheorghe Cristescu), and the Socialist Party (Partidul Socialist) created in 1933 by a group around Constantin Popovici. Shortly after the latter's creation, the factions joined to form the Unitary Socialist Party, only to split again in 1935.

Banned in 1938 by the personal dictatorship of King Carol II, the PSD remained active in clandestinity, peacefully resisting to the rise of Fascism, condemning the Iron Guard and the National Legionary State proclaimed in 1940. With the ascendancy of Ion Antonescu and Romania's participation in World War II alongside the Axis powers (see Romania during World War II), the PSD, who remained favourable to the Allies, continued passive resistance to the regime. After the Soviet occupation of Bessarabia and Northern Bukovina, the social democrats broke all the ties with the communists, who supported the Soviet annexation.

In April 1944, the PCR and the PSD formed a United Workers' Front (Frontul Unic Muncitoresc), which was meant to coordinate actions from the left. In June the two parties, along with the National Peasants' Party and the National Liberals, created the clandestine National Democratic Bloc, which succeeded in overthrowing Antonescu's government on August 23, and backed the government of Constantin Sănătescu which declared war on the Axis.

== Late 1940s ==
Subsequently, PSD entered talks with PCR representative Lucrețiu Pătrășcanu, leading to the creation of the National Democratic Front(Frontul Naţional Democrat, FND) in February 1945 (which grouped the two parties together with Petru Groza's Ploughmen's Front, Mihai Ralea's Socialist Peasants' Party, and Mitiță Constantinescu's Union of Patriots). Meant as an electoral alliance of the Left, the FND faced accusations from the PSD that it was becoming a tool for the PCR (especially after it had passed resolutions reflecting democratic centralism). An internal struggle ensued between the pro-communist wing and Titel Petrescu's supporters; Petrescu's faction (including Lazăr Măglașu) left the PSD in March 1946 to found the Independent Social Democratic Party (Partidul Social Democrat Independent, PSDI), which presented itself as an independent faction in the November 1946 general election - these were won by the FND after a large-scale electoral fraud engineered by the Groza government.

The PCR seized full power in December 1947, beginning 42 years of Communist rule in Romania. Under pressure from the PCR to create "a single party of the working class", the PSD under the leadership of Lothar Rădăceanu and Ștefan Voitec accepted Marxism-Leninism and reunited with the Communists in February 1948 to create the Romanian Workers' Party (Partidul Muncitoresc Român, PMR). However, the few recalcitrant PSD members were quickly pushed out, leaving the PMR as a renamed and enlarged PCR. The PMR changed its name back to the PCR in 1965.

Several former PSD members, including Titel Petrescu, were victims of political repression and many died in communist prisons. On the other, hand, a number of former PSD members went on to high posts in the PMR/PCR. Most notably, Voitec served as an important official in the government for all but a few years until his death in 1984.

== Notable members ==
- Tiron Albani
- Vasile Anagnoste
- Ștefan Baciu
- Dimitrie Batova
- Traian Cercega
- Alexandru Claudian
- Stavri Cunescu
- Adrian Dimitriu
- Poldi Filderman
- Mircea Florian
- Ioan Flueraș
- Leon Ghelerter
- Enea Grapini
- George Grigorovici
- Gheorghe Homasca
- Tudor Ionescu
- Theodor Iordăchescu
- Iorgu Iordan
- Iosif Jumanca
- Leon Kalustian
- Mișa Levin
- Lazăr Măglașu
- Ioan I. Mirescu
- Ilie Moscovici
- Constantin Motaș
- Gheorghe Nicolau
- Ion Pas
- Pavel Pavel
- Constantin Titel Petrescu
- Dumitru Petrescu
- Iacob Pistiner
- Constantin Popovici
- Dumitru Popp
- Lothar Rădăceanu
- Otto Roth
- Dan Simonescu
- Emanoil Socor
- Barbu Solomon
- Alexandru Talex
- Ștefan Tita
- Șerban Voinea
- Ștefan Voitec
- Iancu Zissu

== Electoral history ==
=== Legislative elections ===
Election	Party	Votes	%	Assembly	Senate	Position
1911	PSDR			0 / 183	0 / 112	
1918	PM			1 / 174	0 / 121	5th
1920	PSR			7 / 568	0 / 216	10th
1920	PSR			19 / 366	3 / 166	6th
1922	FPSR			1 / 372	0 / 148	10th
1926	Social; Democrats	40,594	1.6	0 / 387	0 / 115	5th
1927	PSDR	50,059	1.8	0 / 387	0 / 113	5th
1928	PSDR	part of PNȚ-led alliance		9 / 387	0 / 110	
1931	PSDR	94,957	3.3	6 / 387	0 / 113	8th
1932	PSDR	101,068	3.5	7 / 387	0 / 113	8th
1933	PSDR	37,672	1.3	0 / 387	0 / 108	12th
1937	PSDR	28,840	1.0	0 / 387	0 / 113	11th
1939	did not compete					
1946	PSDR	Part of the BDP		81 / 414	Senate disbanded	1st
1946	PSDI	65,528	1.0	0 / 414	Senate disbanded	6th

== See also ==
- Social Democratic Labour Youth Union
- Working Women's Union
