= Petre Bejan =

Romanian engineer and politician

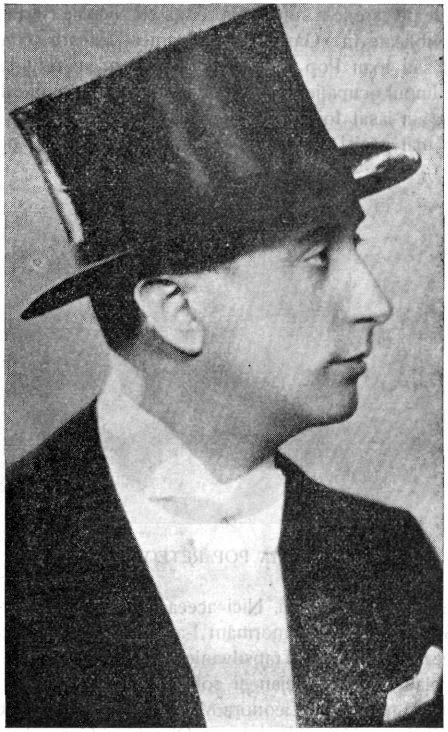
Bejan, c. 1936

Petre Bejan (January 2, 1896 – September 6, 1978) was a Romanian engineer and politician.

== Biography ==
=== Background and early career ===
Born in Ploiești, Bejan was descended from a family of educators from Monor village in Transylvania’s Bistrița-Năsăud County. His father, Nicolae Francisc, harassed by the Austro-Hungarian authorities, left for the Romanian Old Kingdom, settling as a German teacher in Ploiești in 1892. The following year, he married Elena Drăgulinescu, a teacher from Vălenii de Munte, naming their son after his political role model, Petre P. Carp. He died in 1901 at age 38, while in front of his class.

Petre attended Saints Peter and Paul High School. He then enrolled in the National School of Bridges and Highways, taking an engineering degree in 1920. He worked in the local oil industry in various white-collar jobs: head of works at Societatea Columbia, director at Societatea Forage Le Moine, president of the board at Creditul Carbonifer.

=== Political life in the Romanian Kingdom ===
A member of the National Liberal Party (PNL), he first won a seat in the Romanian Chamber of Deputies in 1933. Bejan then held various posts in the cabinets of Gheorghe Tătărescu: undersecretary of state for armament at the National Defence Ministry (May 1935-February 1937), undersecretary of state in the prime minister’s office. In 1945-1946, he headed the Prahova County chapter of the National Liberal Party–Tătărescu (PNL-T). He served as Minister of Industry and Commerce from March 1945 to November 1946, in the Romanian Communist Party-dominated government of Petru Groza.

In advance of the 1946 election, he campaigned alongside Communist leaders Ana Pauker and Gheorghe Gheorghiu-Dej. At one Bloc of Democratic Parties rally, he praised the latter as "the great fighter for our workers and the aspirations of our nation", while urging voters to admire the former’s "modesty, her love for the people and country, which vibrates in every word she speaks". Meanwhile, he harshly attacked the National Peasants' Party and the Dinu Brătianu wing of the PNL, accusing them of harboring figures "totally responsible for our national disaster". Moreover, he asked Tătărescu to impose upon the PNL-T a policy of loyalty towards the communists.

By the summer and autumn of 1947, Bejan was leading the pro-communist wing of the PNL-T, not out of doctrinal affinity, but from political opportunism. A more charitable interpretation holds that he was trying to keep his party afloat at all costs, hoping that a change in the domestic, but especially the international situation, would return Romania to a democratic path. In early November, the liberal ministers resigned from the government and Bejan took over the party from Tătărescu. He unveiled a platform that shocked some members: while not preaching class struggle, his faction embraced a "liberal-socialist" vision that accepted the end of capitalism, although calling for individual private property to be safeguarded.

=== Aftermath under communism ===
In February 1948, after the establishment of a communist regime, he decided to hold a party congress, preemptively expelling several members who failed to adhere to the new line. The congress was delayed later that month; meanwhile, he decided to participate in the March election for a constituent assembly. The communists allowed what was now the PNL-Bejan to win seven seats; Bejan declared his satisfaction. The assembly’s first order of business was to adopt a new constitution on the Stalinist model; Bejan rose to praise and declare his full support for the charter, with all PNL-B deputies voting in favor. In June, he voted for the nationalization of industry. The last official meeting of the party leadership occurred in May 1948; at the end of the month, its newspaper, Drapelul, ceased to appear.

In spite of his collaboration with the new authorities, in May 1950 he was arrested for his role inside the PNL. Groza pushed for the arrest, arguing that as long as he remained free, Bejan could inspire followers. In theory, as a member of the Great National Assembly, he enjoyed legislative immunity. When Securitate agents showed up at his residence, he asked to see the arrest warrant and refused to follow them, demanding to talk to Constantin Ion Parhon (the nominal head of state at the time); after he was allowed to speak on the phone, Bejan asked if his parliamentary immunity had been lifted and was told that it was useless to object. In 1951, he was sent to a penal colony for two years. His term was then increased on account of his "intense activity against the working class". Freed from Sighet Prison in July 1955, he was forced to live for five years in internal exile on the Bărăgan Plain in Măzăreni, Brăila County. After this term expired in 1960, he was sent to work as an engineer at the collective farm in Butimanu, Dâmbovița County.

He had two sons, Marius and Romulus.
