= Working Women's Union =

The Working Women's Union (Romanian: Uniunea femeilor muncitoare, abbreviated UFM) was a women's organization in interbellum Romania, and the women's wing of the Social Democratic Party of Romania. As of 1947, UFM claimed to have 123,561 members.
