= Social Democratic Labour Youth Union =

Romanian youth organization

The Social Democratic Labour Youth Union (Romanian: Uniunea tineretului muncitor socialdemocrat) was a youth organization in interbellum Romania and the youth of the Social Democratic Party of Romania. As of 1947, the organization had nearly 100,000 members.
