= National Liberal Party–Tătărescu =

National Liberal Party–Tătărescu Partidul Național Liberal–Tătărescu
- Leader: Gheorghe Tătărescu (Note: First leader whose party presidency spanned from 1944 to 1947.); Petre Bejan (Note: Second and last leader whose party presidency spanned from 1947 to 1950.)
- Founded: 1944
- Dissolved: 1950
- Split from: National Liberal Party (PNL)
- Ideology: Liberalism; Social liberalism
- Political position: Centre to centre-left
- National affiliation: Bloc of Democratic Parties (1946)
- Colours: Yellow

The National Liberal Party–Tătărescu (Romanian: Partidul Național Liberal-Tătărescu, PNL-Tătărescu) was a liberal and social liberal political party in the Kingdom of Romania and then in the Socialist Republic of Romania. It was established as a breakaway faction (or spin off) from the main, historical National Liberal Party (PNL) in 1944. From December 1947 onwards, the party was generally referred to as the National Liberal Party–Bejan (PNL-Bejan), as initial leader (or party president) Gheorghe Tătărescu resigned from the party and was replaced by the party's second and last leader, Petre Bejan, before being banned or dissolved by the Communist authorities in 1950.

== History ==
The party resulted from a split in the National Liberal Party (PNL), with the faction centered around Gheorghe Tătărescu, former twice Prime Minister of Romania (both as PNL member and as FRN member), the party's general secretary, establishing a distinct party organisation in late 1944 (the other breakway faction of the PNL, which supported its own party president in the person Gheorghe I. Brătianu, was consequently known as PNL-Brătianu, but ceased to exist in 1938).

In April 1946, the party opted to join the pro-governmental Bloc of Democratic Parties (BPD). At the November 1946 elections, the Bloc won 347 of the 414 seats, with the PNL-T taking 75. In the 1948 elections, the party ran separately as PNL-Bejan, in opposition to the Communist governmental coalition led by Petru Groza and only receiving 7 seats in the Great National Assembly (Romanian: Marea Adunare Națională), the unicameral Romanian Parliament back then and the equivalent of the nowadays Chamber of Deputies. The party was subsequently banned (or dissolved) by the Romanian Communist authorities in 1950.

In stark contrast to the breakaway faction led by Tătărescu and then by Bejan, the main, historical PNL which was led by its last president, Dinu Brătianu, until it was banned (or dissolved) by the Romanian Communist authorities as well (early on in 1948), remained staunchly anti-governmental and in continuous opposition towards the Communists led by Groza.

== Leadership ==
Nº	Name Born – Died	Portrait	Term start	Term end
1	Gheorghe Tătărescu (1886–1957)		1944	1947
2	Petre Bejan (1896–1978)		1947	1950

== Election results ==
=== Parliament ===
Election	Votes	%	Seats	Position	Status
1946	Part of the BPD		75 / 414	2nd	BPD government (1946–1947)
1948	212,438	2.8%	7 / 414	5th	Opposition to BPD government (1947–1950)

== See also ==
- Liberalism and radicalism in Romania
