= Democratic Peasants' Party–Lupu =

Democratic Peasants' Party–Lupu Partidul Țărănesc Democrat–Lupu
- Leader: Nicolae L. Lupu
- Founded: 20 January 1946
- Split from: National Peasants' Party
- Ideology: Agrarianism; Poporanism; Agrarian socialism
- Political position: Centre-left

The Democratic Peasants' Party–Lupu (Romanian: Partidul Țărănesc Democrat–Lupu) was a political party in Romania.

== History ==
The party was established on 20 January 1946 as a breakaway from the National Peasants' Party (PNȚ). Led by Nicolae L. Lupu, it contested the November 1946 elections, winning two seats. Despite its vote share falling from 2.4% to 0.7%, the party retained its two seats in the 1948 elections. However, they were the last multi-party elections held until 1990.

== Electoral history ==
=== Legislative elections ===
Election	Votes	%	Seats	Position
1946	161,314	2.4%	2 / 414	5th
1948	50,532	0.7%	2 / 414	3rd
