= 1922 Romanian general election =

← 1920	1–3 March 1922	1926 →

All 369 seats in the Chamber of Deputies All 148 seats in the Senate
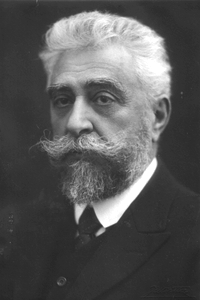

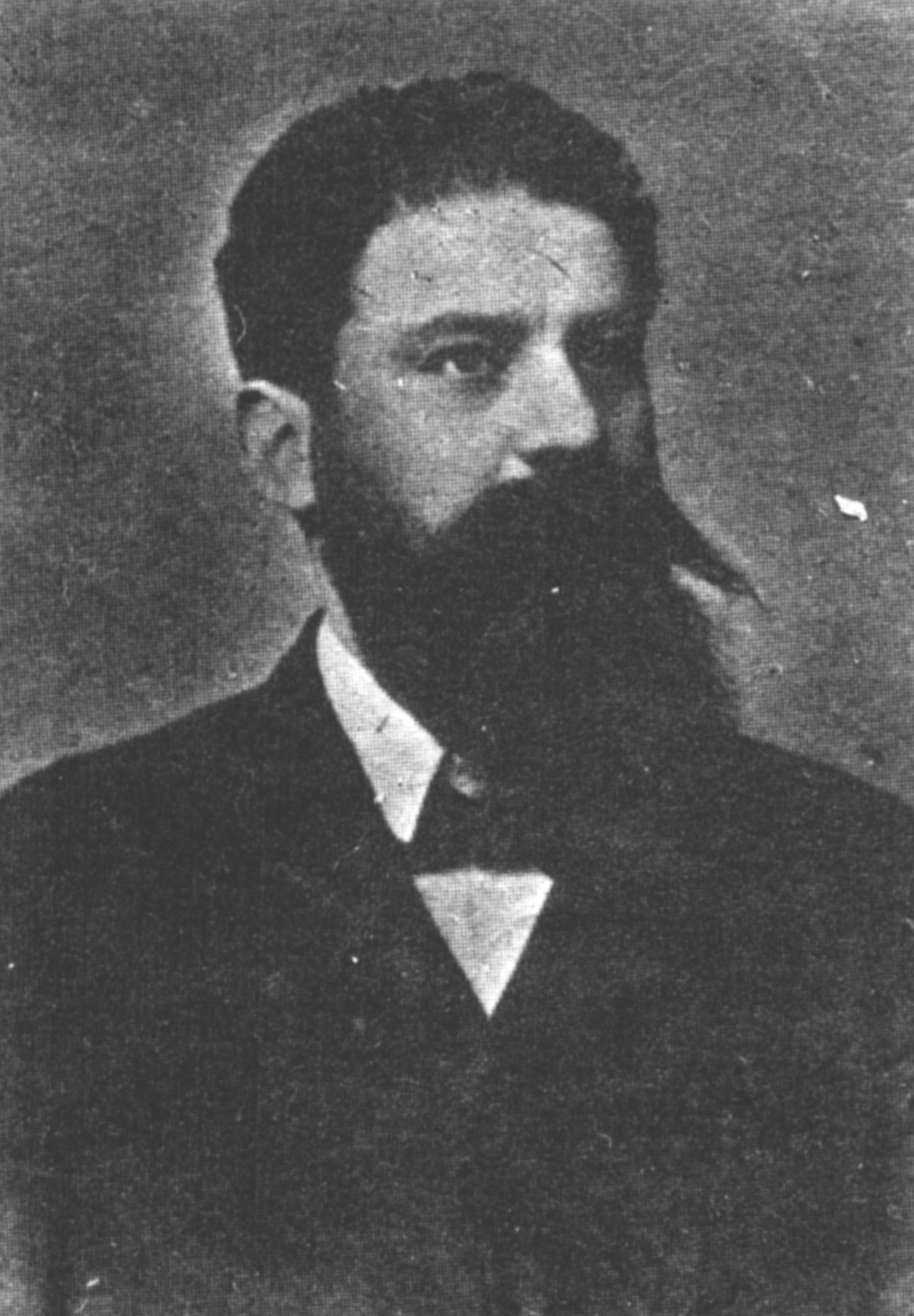
	Majority party	Minority party
Leader	Ion I. C. Brătianu	Constantin Stere
Party	PNL	PȚ
Leader's seat	Gorj County	Soroca County
Seats won	227 C / 111 S	40 C / 11 S
Seat change	▲211 C / ▲110 S	▲15 C / ▲1 S
Prime Minister before election
Ion I. C. Brătianu
PNL
Subsequent Prime Minister
Ion I. C. Brătianu
PNL

General elections were held in Romania between 1 and 3 March 1922. In the first stage between 1 and 3 March, seats in the Senate were elected. In the second stage between 5 and 7 March the Chamber of Deputies was elected, and in the third and final stage from 9 to 11 March, additional Senate seats were elected. The result was a victory for the governing National Liberal Party, which won 227 of the 369 seats in the Chamber of Deputies and 111 of the 148 seats in the Senate. Both houses were combined to form a Constitutional Assembly, which approved the 1923 constitution.

== Campaign ==
In 34 of the 121 constituencies in Transylvania, candidates ran unopposed and were proclaimed elected without an actual poll, mostly because the National Liberal government refused to register opposition candidates. Overall, the campaign was dominated by the government through what some opposition representative deemed "terror". The National Liberals freely used the administration and the Army in order to promote its candidates and intimidate the opposition, rejected the registration of many opposition candidates while pressuring others into withdrawing, destroyed opposition publications, forbade or brutally dissolved opposition rallies, arrested candidates and worked to split the vote among the competing opposition parties.

Government pressure continued during election day. According to Constantin Stere, army officers in Bessarabia campaigned for the government inside the polling stations and entered voting booths to ensure a vote for the government. According to Nicolae Iorga, government agents beat up opposition supporters in Fălticeni, Dorohoi and Odobești, prevented whole villages from voting in the Putna County, while in Argeș County the soldiers voted instead of the public. In several places across the country, opposition candidates were prevented from voting. Opposition leaders condemned the abuses of the government, with Romanian National Party leader Iuliu Maniu declaring the elections "a European scandal" and initially refusing to take part in the works of the newly elected Parliament.

== Results ==
=== Chamber of Deputies ===
Party	Multi-member seats			Single-member seats			Total seats	+/–
Party	Votes	%	Seats	Votes	%	Seats	Total seats	+/–
National Liberal Party	5,173,998	53.87	146	205,338	33.06	81	227	+211
Peasants' Party	1,865,083	19.42	40	13,394	2.16	0	40	+15
Romanian National Party				173,085	27.87	25	25	–2
Bessarabian Peasants' Party	666,650	6.94	22				22	–1
Democratic Union Party				126,933	20.44	16	16	New
People's Party	735,417	7.66	11	25,774	4.15	1	12	–194
German Parliament Party				20,984	3.38	9	9	–1
National Monarchist List (PȚ–PND) (Note: Ran in Dorohoi County.)	139,052	1.45	4				4	New
Democratic Nationalist Party–Iorga	281,640	2.93	2	2,517	0.41	1	3	–7
Socialist Party	74,860	0.78	0	27,573	4.44	2	2	New
Conservative-Democratic Party	59,298	0.62	1			1	2	–15
Bessarabian Democratic League	58,772	0.61	2				2	–
Jewish Party	63,336	0.66	1				1	–
Dissident National Liberal Party	29,788	0.31	1				1	–
Magyar Party				9,224	1.49	1	1	–
Progressive Conservative Party	91,230	0.95	0				0	–
Communist Party	63,131	0.66	0				0	New
Socialist Peasants' Party	57,443	0.60	0				0	–
Orhei Independent Party	23,142	0.24	0				0	New
Independents	221,299	2.30	1	16,222	2.61	1	2	–
Total	9,604,139	100.00	231	621,044	100.00	138	369	+3
Source: Sternberger et al.

=== Senate ===
Party	Seats	+/–
National Liberal Party	111	+110
Bessarabian Peasants' Party	13	+7
Peasants' Party	11	+1
Romanian National Party	9	–5
People's Party	2	–122
Democratic Nationalist Party	2	–
Total	148	–18
Source: Nohlen & Stöver
