= 1946 Romanian general election =

- 19 November 1946

All 414 seats in Parliament 208 seats needed for a majority
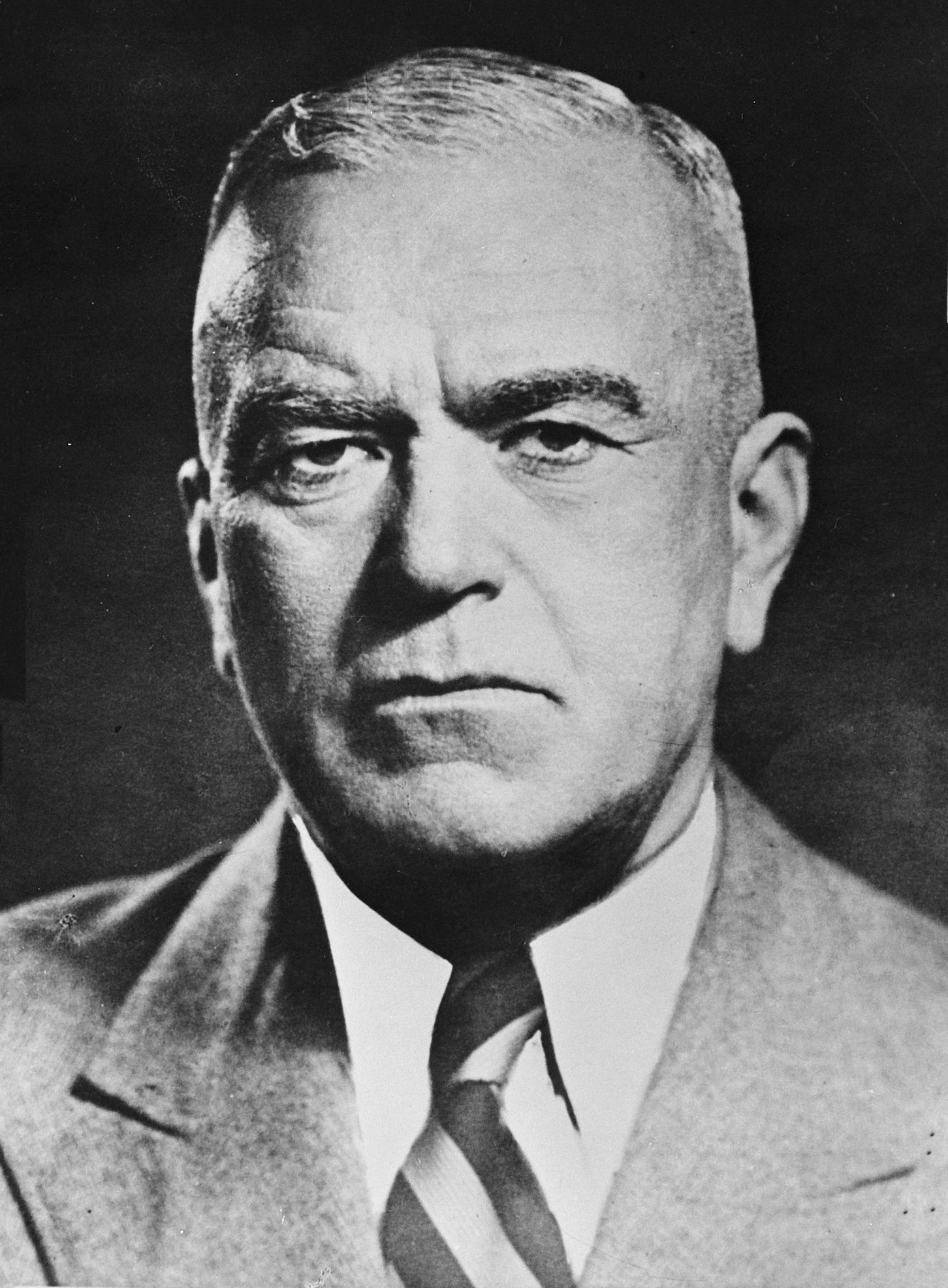

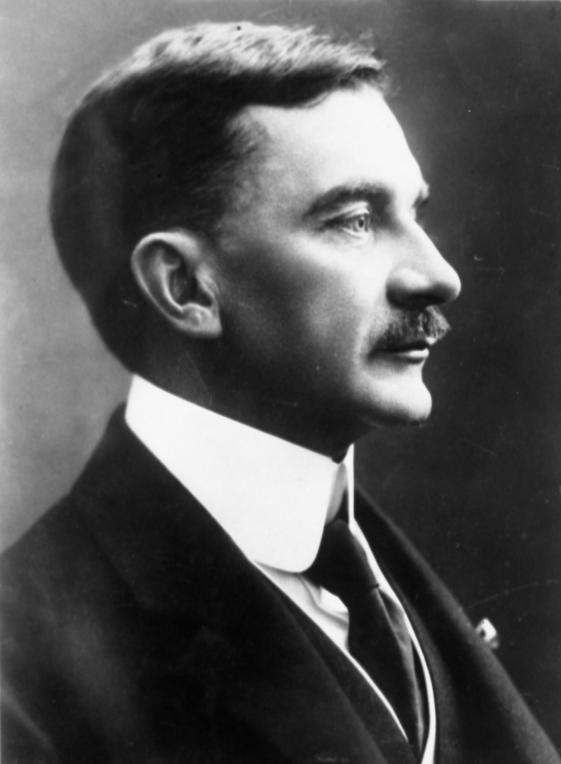

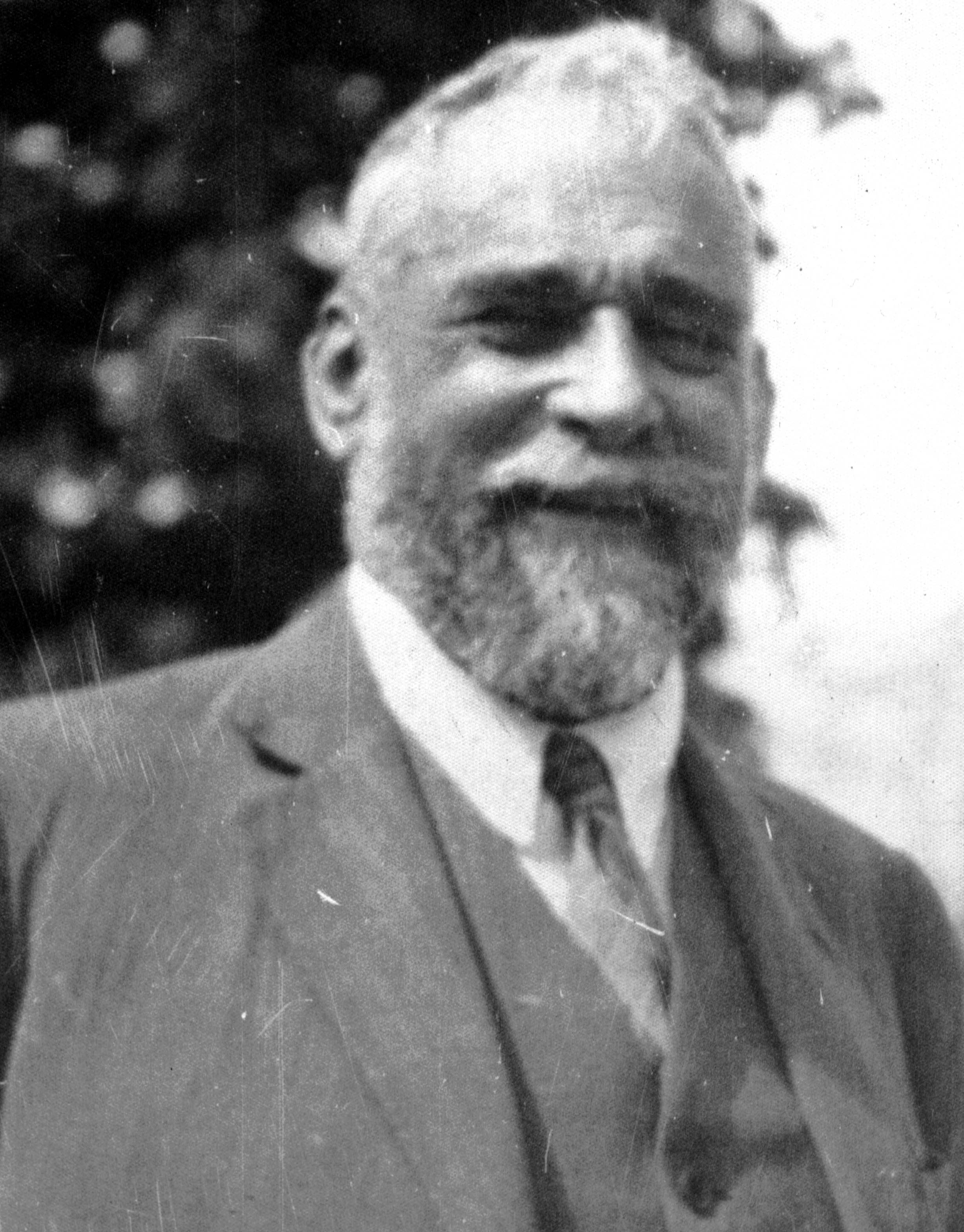

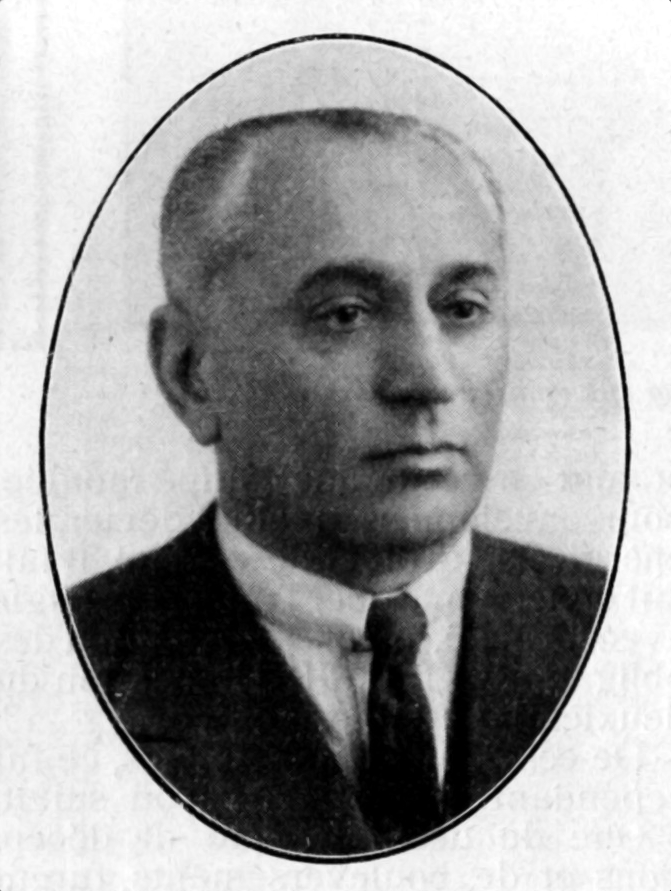
	Majority party	Minority party	Third party
Leader	Petru Groza	Iuliu Maniu	Gyárfás Kurkó
Party	BPD	PNȚ	UPM
Seats won	347	33	29
Seat change	New	▲33	▲29
Popular vote	4,773,689	881,304	568,862
Percentage	69.77%	12.88%	8.31%
	Fourth party	Fifth party
Leader	Dinu Brătianu	Nicolae Lupu
Party	PNL	PȚD–Lupu
Seats won	3	2
Seat change	▲3	New
Popular vote	259,068	161,314
Percentage	3.79%	2.36%
Prime Minister before election
Petru Groza
Ploughmen's Front
Elected Prime Minister
Petru Groza
Ploughmen's Front

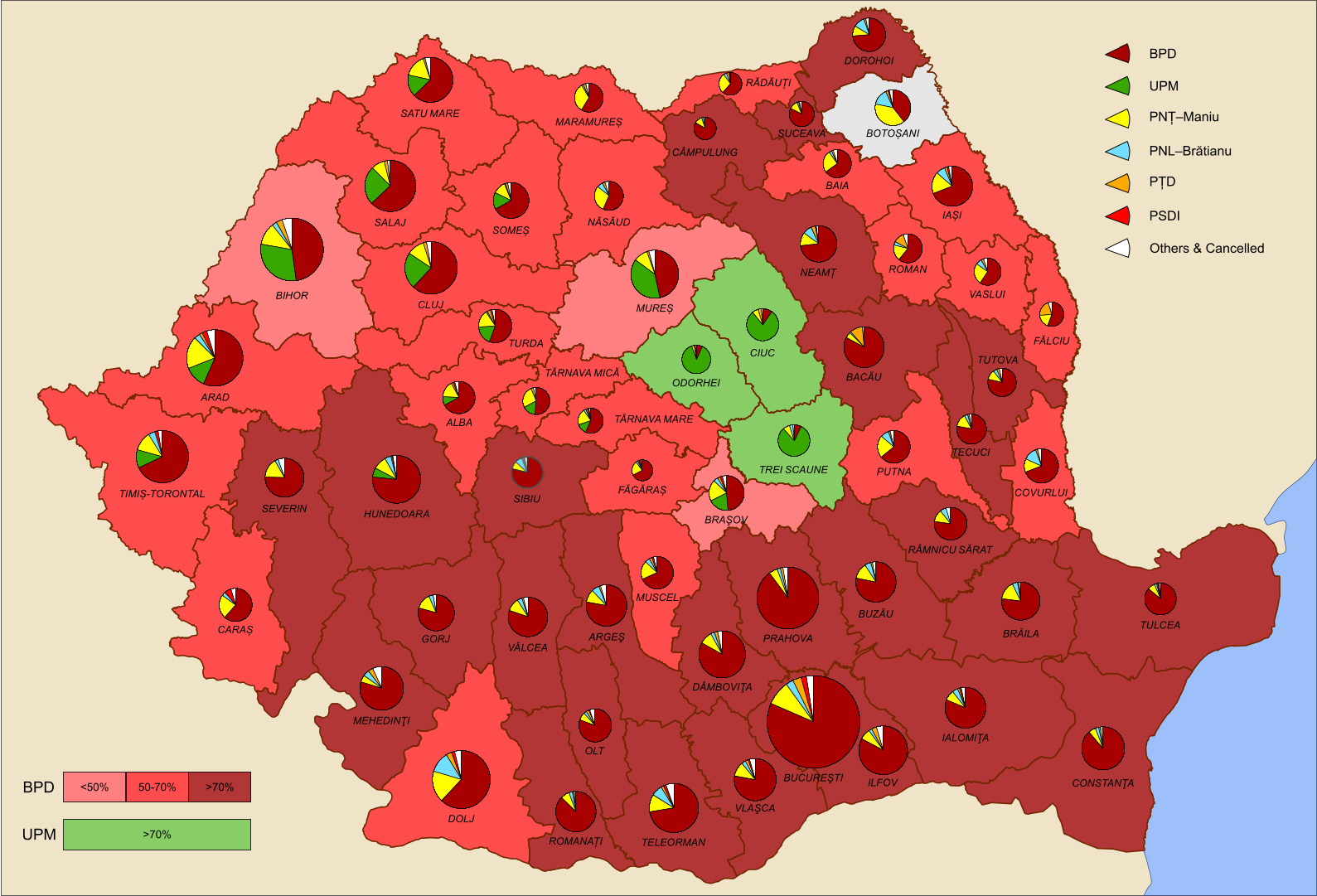
Official results at county level

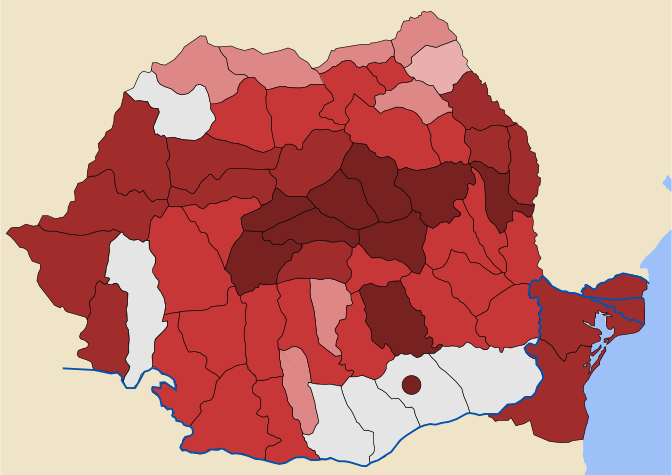
Results for the BPD and UPM per county, according to the Romanian Communist Party report cited by Petre Țurlea. 60% and over 50 to 60% 30 to 50% 15 to 30% 0 to 15% unknown or undisclosed

General elections were held in Romania on 19 November 1946, in the aftermath of World War II. The official results gave a victory to the Bloc of Democratic Parties (Blocul Partidelor Democrate, BPD), together with its associates, the Hungarian People's Union (UPM or MNSZ) and the Democratic Peasants' Party–Lupu. The elections marked a decisive step towards the disestablishment of the Romanian monarchy and the proclamation of a Communist regime at the end of the following year. Breaking with the traditional universal male suffrage confirmed by the 1923 Constitution, it was the first national election to feature women's suffrage, and the first to allow active public officials and army personnel the right to vote. The BPD, representing the incumbent leftist government formed around Prime Minister Petru Groza, was an electoral alliance comprising the PCR, the Social Democratic Party (PSD), the Ploughmen's Front, the National Liberal Party–Tătărescu (PNL–Tătărescu), the National Peasants' Party–Alexandrescu (PNȚ–Alexandrescu) and the National Popular Party.

According to official results, the BPD received 69.8% of the vote, enough for an overwhelming majority of 347 seats in the 414-seat unicameral Parliament. Between them, the BPD and its allies won 379 seats, controlling over 91 percent of the chamber. The National Peasants' Party–Maniu (PNȚ–Maniu) won 32 seats and the National Liberal Party (PNL–Brătianu) only three. In general, commentators agree that the BPD carried the vote through widespread intimidation tactics and electoral fraud, to the detriment of both the PNȚ–Maniu and the PNL–Brătianu. While there is disagreement over the exact results, it is contended that the BPD and its allies actually won no more than 48 percent of the total, with several authors assuming PNȚ–Maniu to be the overall winner. Journalist Victor Frunză claims that the actual votes for the PNȚ–Maniu could have allowed it to form a government, either in its own right or as senior partner in a non-BPD coalition. Historian Marin Pop considers that this was the most fraudulent election in the history of Romanian politics. Various authors note however that the fraud has been mythologised by the opposition, including in its post-1990 installments. The 1946 elections were in many ways similar to the ones won by PNL–Brătianu or PNȚ before World War II: the governing party always used state resources in its campaign, ensuring for itself a comfortable majority, against clamorous accusations of fraud and violence coming from the opposition parties.

Carried out upon the close of World War II, under Romania's occupation by Soviet troops, the elections have drawn comparisons to the similarly flawed elections held at the time in most of the emerging Eastern Bloc (in Albania, Bulgaria, Czechoslovakia, Hungary and Poland), being considered, in respect to its formal system of voting, among the most permissive of the latter.

== Background ==
Following its exit from the Axis in the wake of the coup d'état of 23 August 1944, Romania became subject to Allied supervision (see Romania during World War II, Allied Commission). After the Yalta Conference in February 1945, Soviet authorities had increased their presence in Romania, as Western Allied governments resorted to expressing largely inconsequential criticism of new procedures in place. After the Potsdam Conference, the latter group initially refused to recognize Groza's administration, which had been imposed after Soviet pressure.

Consequently, King Michael I refused to sign legislation advanced by the cabinet (this was the so-called Greva regală, "Royal strike"). On 8 November 1945, authorities repressed a gathering of Bucharesters organized by the two main opposition parties in front of the Royal Palace. Demonstrators, many of them young students, flocked to the plaza in front of the palace to express their solidarity with the monarch (on the Orthodox liturgics Saint Michael's Day); however, armed groups attacked the Ministries of Interior and Propaganda, as well as the headquarters of pro-government organisations, including the General Confederation of Labour and the Patriotic Defense. Following clashes with government supporters and troops, some 10 or 11 people were left dead and many injured. The government declared a national day of mourning, and state funerals were held on 12 November for seven of the victims, hailed as fighters for democracy and independence, "assassinated by bands of fascist killers". Nevertheless, Victor Frunză claims that, depicting the event as a coup d'état attempt, authorities had fired on the crowd. In January 1946, the "Royal strike" itself ended following the Moscow Conference, which made US and British recognition of the government dependent on the inclusion of two politicians from the main opposition parties. Consequently, the National Liberal Mihail Romniceanu and the National Peasants' Emil Hațieganu joined the cabinet as Minister without Portfolio.

In mid-December 1945, the representatives of the three major Allied Powers—Andrey Vyshinsky from the Soviet Union, W. Averell Harriman from the United States, and Archibald Clerk-Kerr from the United Kingdom—visited the capital Bucharest and agreed for elections to be convened in May 1946, on the basis of the Yalta Agreements. Nevertheless, the pro-Soviet Groza cabinet took the liberty to prolong the term, passing the required new electoral procedure on June 15.

On the same day, a royal decree was published abolishing the Senate, turning the Parliament into a unicameral legislature, the Assembly of Deputies (Adunarea Deputaților). The new legislation, revising the 1923 Constitution, was made possible by the fact that Groza was governing without a parliament (the last legislature to have functioned, that of the National Renaissance Front, had been dissolved in 1941). The Senate was traditionally considered reactionary by the PCR, with historian Marian Ștefan arguing the measure was meant to facilitate control over the legislative process The BPD government also removed the majority bonus, awarded since 1926 to the party that had obtained more than 40% of the total suffrage.

The election coincided with the deterioration of relations between the Soviet Union and the West at the start of the Cold War, notably marked by Winston Churchill's "Iron Curtain" speech at Westminster College on 5 March 1946, and the centering of Western Allied interest in turning the tide of the Civil War in Greece. The intricate issues posed by the latter contributed to weakening ties between the Romanian opposition groups and their Western supporters.

The date of the election coincided with the fourth anniversary of Operation Uranus, the moment when Nazi Germany and Romania suffered a major defeat on the Eastern Front at the Battle of Stalingrad. According to his private notes, General Constantin Sănătescu, an adversary of the PCR and former Premier, presumed that this had been done on purpose ("in order to mock us").

== BPD ==
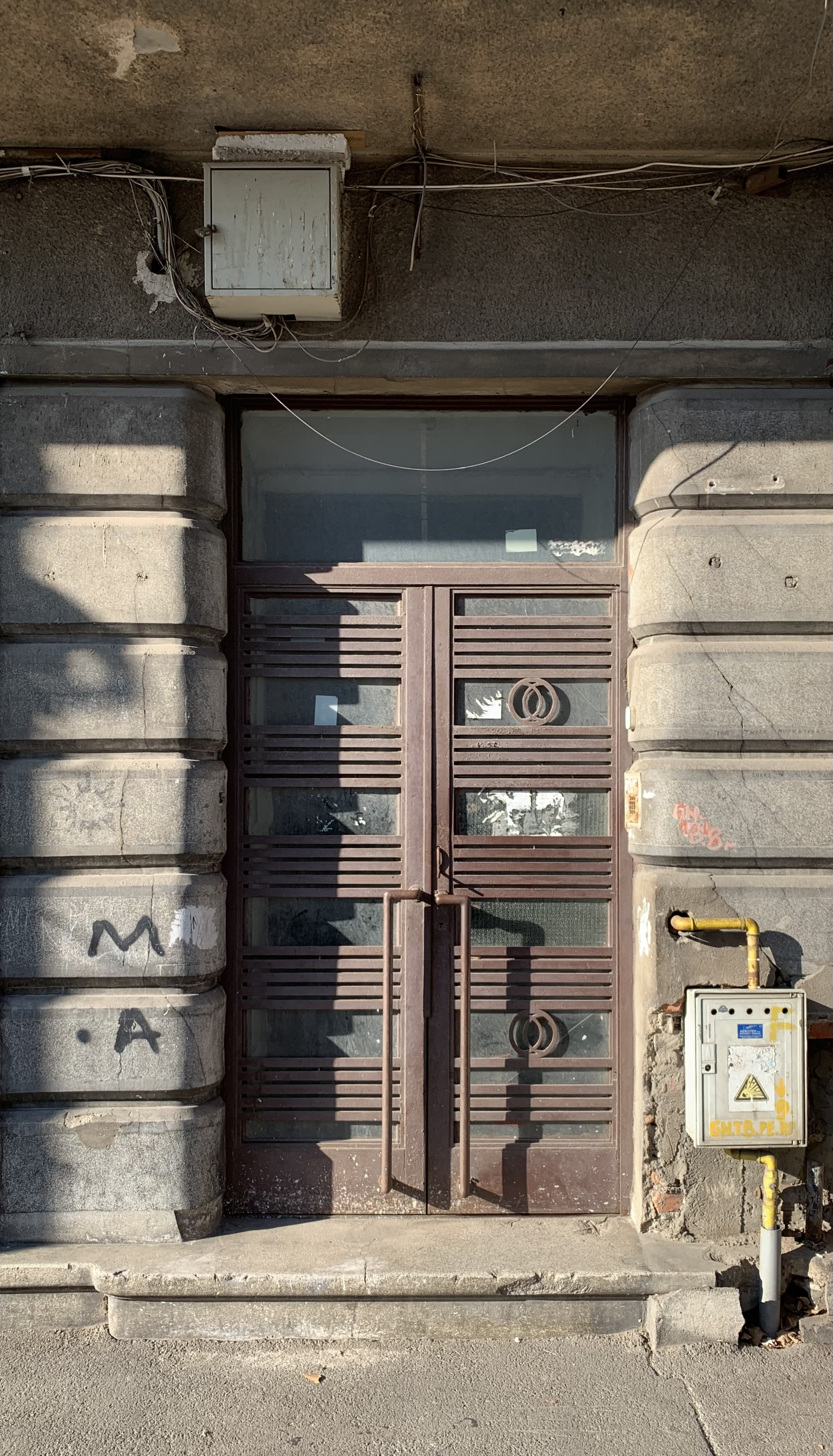
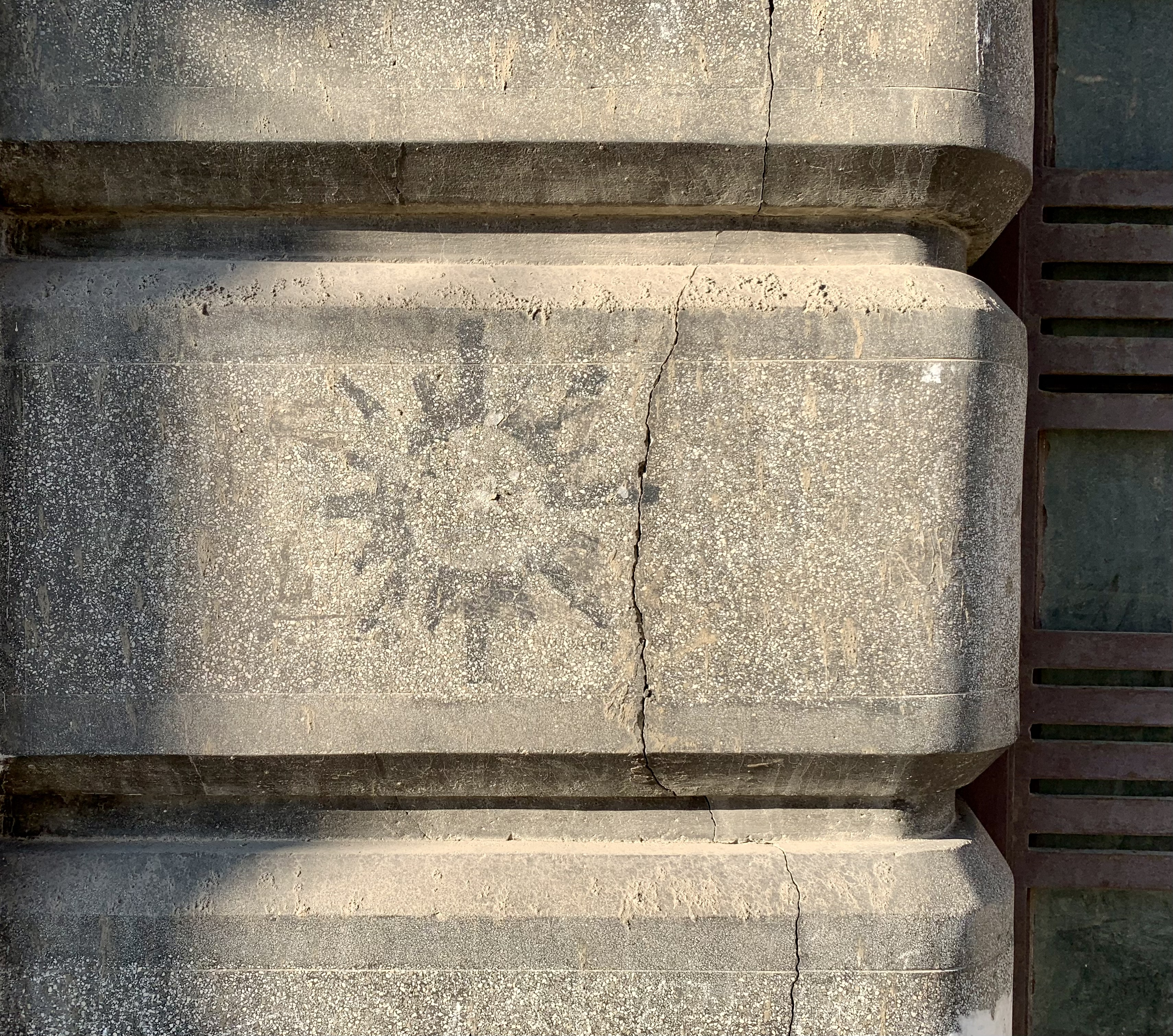
Stencil with the BPD logo (the sun, linked with the slogan "Votați soarele, semnul Blocului Partidelor Democrate!" ("Vote the sun, the sign of the BPD!")), next to the door of the Art Deco apartment building no. 172 on Calea Griviței in Bucharest

Following Romania's exit from the war, left-wing parties had increased their membership several times. The PCR, which held its first open and legal conference in October 1945, had begun a massive recruitment campaign. By 1947, it grew to 600,000-700,000 members from an initial 1,000 in 1944 (the constant growth in membership was by far the highest of all Eastern Bloc countries).

Similarly, the Ploughmen's Front, which Groza presided, was estimated to have 1,000,000–1,500,000 members or just 800,000. In early November 1946, Communist sources show that the BPD counted an important part of the gains in the rural areas to be obtained from the Front's electorate (the poor and middle peasant categories). By the time of the election, Groza's party had just been pressured into supporting Communist tenets, after it a brief conflict had erupted over the PCR's designs of collectivization.

The Social Democratic Party (PSD), which had been drawn into close collaboration with the PCR as early as 1944 (as part of the United Workers' Front, Frontul Unic Muncitoresc), had also seen a steady growth in numbers; the PSD was by then dominated by the pro-PCR wing of Ștefan Voitec and Lothar Rădăceanu, who purged the staunchly Reformist group of Constantin Titel Petrescu in March 1946 (leading the latter to establish his own independent group). The Communist Ana Pauker noted with dissatisfaction that certain members of the PSD continued to remain hostile to her party (she cited the example of an unnamed intellectual and low-ranking member of the PSD who, during a BPD meeting, shouted a slogan in support of the PNȚ's Iuliu Maniu).

As a representative of the middle class, the National Liberal Party–Tătărescu itself had an uneasy relation with the PCR, having declared its support for capitalism.

The Hungarian People's Union (UPM or MNSZ), which represented the Hungarian minority was instrumental in securing Transylvanian votes for the government coalition, as admitted by the PCR itself. Nevertheless, the pro-communist commander of the 4th Army Corps saw the overwhelming vote for the UPM among the soldiers and PCR members of Hungarian origin as an indication of "chauvinism". The BPD also won the endorsement of the Jewish Democratic Committee, which included members of Jewish-Romanian community favourable to the PCR.

With their organization banned in accordance with the 1944 armistice agreement, members of the fascist Iron Guard adopted an entryist tactic, infiltrating all legally-existing parties. One of the most notable cases was that of underground leader Horațiu Comaniciu, who urged former guardists to join the opposition National Peasants' Party. In a bid to escape punishment for their crimes some even joined the Communists. A report of November 1945 indicates that, of the 15,538 former Iron Guard members known to have joined political parties, 2,258 chose PCR, while 3,281 entered the PSD.

Historians suggest that, at the time, government-backed Communists had infiltrated the vast majority of the media and cultural institutions. On one occasion, the Red Army general Ivan Susaykov warned Nicolae Carandino, editor-in-chief of the PNȚ's Dreptatea, to tone down his criticism of the government, and reportedly argued that "the Groza government is Soviet Russia itself".

== Electoral system ==
New legislation provided for the end of universal male suffrage, proclaiming the right to vote for all citizens over the age of 21, while restricting it for all persons who had held important office during the wartime dictatorship of Conducător Ion Antonescu. The latter requirement facilitated abuse, as power to decide over who had been supporting the regime fell to "purging commissions", all of them controlled by the PCR, and the Romanian People's Tribunals (investigating war crimes, and constantly supported by agitprop in the Communist press).

The decision to allow military men and public officials to vote was also intended to secure a grip on elections. At the time, Groza's cabinet exercised complete control over public administration at central and local levels, as well as the means of communication. Soviet sources cited PCR officials giving assurances that the respective categories were to provide as much as 1 million votes for the BPD.

A report of the Soviet Embassy in Bucharest, dated 15 August 1946, informed Andrey Vyshinsky of the legislative changes and made note of the fact that the two opposition leaders, Iuliu Maniu (leader of the PNȚ–Maniu) and Dinu Brătianu (leader of the PNL–Brătianu), had asked King Michael I not to approve the new framework. The two parties had not been allowed to take any part in drafting the new legal framework.

== Early estimates ==
Months before the election, Communist leaders expressed confidence in being able to carry the election by 70 or 80% (statement of the Minister of the Interior Teohari Georgescu during a party plenary, and Constantin Vișoianu's report about an alleged declaration of Minister of Justice Lucrețiu Pătrășcanu), or even 90% (Miron Constantinescu, head of the PCR's Scînteia newspaper). As early as May, former Minister of Foreign Affairs Constantin Vișoianu complained to Adrian Holman, the British Ambassador to Romania, that the BPD had ensured the means to win the elections through fraud. Writing in January, Archibald Clerk-Kerr assessed the results of his visit to Romania, arguing that no person he had met actually trusted that elections were going to be free; furthermore, in an interview published after Vyshinsky's death, former US ambassador W. Averell Harriman claimed the Soviet diplomat believed in January 1946 that, on its own, the PCR was not capable of gathering more than 10% of the vote.

According to the American diplomat Burton Y. Berry, Groza had admitted to this procedure during an alleged conversation with a third party, indicating that the fraudulent percentages were the goal of competition between two sides — him and the PCR's general secretary Gheorghe Gheorghiu-Dej formed one, while a "Cominternist section" around Emil Bodnăraș represented the other; according to Berry, Groza and Gheorghiu-Dej were satisfied with a less intrusive fraud and, thus, a more realistic result (60%), while Bodnăraș aimed for 90%. W. Averell Harriman, recording his conversation with Vyshinsky, alleged that the latter backed the 70% estimate. Nevertheless, the Soviet Ambassador Sergey Kavtaradze stated that, while the party leadership estimated winning 60-70%, "through certain 'techniques'", the BPD could win up to 90%. A reference to "techniques" was also made by Ana Pauker in conversation with Soviet officials; she nevertheless expressed her belief that, without such techniques, the overall result was not going to be upwards of 60% (Pauker also voiced concern that such a figure, while a victory for the BPD coalition, would result in a minority for the PCR itself).

Historian Adrian Cioroianu assessed that the dissemination of optimistic rumors contributed to accustoming the public to the idea that the government could obtain the majority of the votes, and made the ultimate result less questionable in the eyes of observers.

Other Soviet documents, dated November 6 and 12, summarize a conversation with Bodnăraș, who went on record indicating that fraud was being prepared to raise the percentage from 55 to 65% to 90%; compared to the mandates awarded to the BPD according to the official results, his estimation came within 1%, though this was not the case for the mandates obtained by other competitors. Kavtaradze expressed concern that information on this topic had leaked out to opposition parties in various locations, and that the PCR had thus failed to fully respect the "conspiratorial character" it had decided to use.

== Economic and social issues ==
An expectation shared by Groza and the PCR in postponing the elections was that the outcome of harvests was to ensure the most favorable attitude from peasant voters ("[Groza] has declared that the government will only organize elections «when the barns are filled with wheat»"). This tactic was consistently applied by parties in government during the interwar period. Conversely, the opposition wanted to postpone the elections until after the Peace Treaty with the Allies had been signed, hoping that the withdrawal of Soviet troops would allow greater intervention of the Western Allies in Romanian internal matters.

The summer of 1946 brought an exceptionally severe drought, which led to famine in some areas. In a discussion with Soviet embassy staff, PCR leader Ana Pauker claimed that this had been worsened by administrative incompetence, which had led to insufficient supplies of wheat and bread at the central level, and to various irregularities in transport over the national railway system which she attributed to sabotage. Kavtaradze blamed the government itself for failing to prepare the economy for the elections. Pauker further mentioned that Communists were especially concerned about events related to the petroleum industry in Romania (centered on Prahova County), which was by then becoming much less lucrative. Tudor Ionescu, the PSD's Minister of Mines and Petroleum, supported the initiative of American and British businessmen to withdraw their investments, but was opposed by the PCR, who argued that this was a move to undermine support for the government, by leaving thousands of people unemployed. Pauker also declared that a similar move was to be carried out by Ford's Bucharest branch. Kavtaradze noted dissatisfaction among workers, civil servants, and Romanian Army personnel over their low incomes.

In this context, the government began handing out food supplies. Pauker attested that, in several places, the state was frustrated in its attempt to purchase grain from peasants, who argued that the price was too low, and that this led to the supplies being insufficient. The government eventually took the decision to import grain (and especially maize) in large quantities, an action overseen by Gheorghiu-Dej. According to Kavtardze, such measures were partly ineffective.

Pauker's testimony stressed that, while problems in applying the land reform damaged the BPD's image in some counties in rural regions, its main support came from the formerly landless peasantry. She also attested that, in several counties in Moldavia, the absentee ballot was becoming an option among members of the latter social category ("Asked whom they would vote for, peasants answer: "We'll think about it some more" or "We shall not be voting""). While disheartened by the government's apparent failure to provide help, the peasants also distrusted the opposition's PNȚ–Maniu, whom they saw as representative of the landlords and opposed to the land reform. According to Pauker, they were falling for PNȚ–Maniu's propaganda, which claimed the Groza cabinet had carried out the land reform only as a preliminary step to collectivization ("Peasants answer that in Russia as well, in the beginning the land was divided, then taken away and kolkhozy were set up. We have no convincing arguments against such objections from the peasants").

The BPD took additional measures in regard to women voters in villages, most of them illiterate. According to Pauker, several agitprop campaigns were aimed at them, during which Communist activists stressed the positive aspects of the Groza government. Pauker stated: "a lot of things will depend on how the presidents of election bureaus treat women voters, since women have never voted, have never seen electoral laws and are not aware of voting procedures". The UPM also actively campaigned among women, with its propaganda considered to be better than PCR's even by government agents. In one incident, witnessed during the elections and occurring in Cluj, "there was an unexpected turnout of Magyar women. Old women aged 70–80, carrying chairs, had queued, in rainy weather, awaiting their turn to vote. The slogan was: if one does not vote with the UPM, one does not receive sugar".

The women's suffrage was regarded with a level of hostility by the PNȚ–Maniu, and Dreptatea frequently ridiculed Pauker's visits to women in various villages.

== Conduct ==
=== General irregularities ===
The period of campaigning and the election itself were witness to widespread irregularities, with historian and politician Dinu C. Giurescu claiming violence and intimidation were carried out both by squads of the BPD and by those of the opposition. In one instance, in Pitești, a local leader of the PNȚ was killed in the headquarters of the local prosecutor.

Prior to the election, freedom of association had been severely curtailed through various laws; according to Burton Y. Berry, Groza had admitted to this, and had indicated that it was in answer to the need for order in the country. Expanding on this, he stated that the cabinet was attempting to prevent "provocations" from both the far right and far left, and that chaos during the elections would have resulted in his own sidelining and a dictatorship of the far left. In regard to the arrest of several Romanian employees of the American Embassy in Bucharest, Groza reportedly claimed that he had tried to set them free, but the "extremists in the government" had opposed this move. According to the opposition PNȚ's newspaper, he had reportedly stated in a February 1946 meeting with workers: "If the reaction wins, do you think we'll let it live for [another] 24 hours? We'll be getting our payback immediately. We'll get our hands on whatever we can and we'll strike".

According to Berry, the Premier had stated that he assessed Romania's commitment to freedom of election in opposition to the Western Allied requirements, and based on "the Russian interpretation of «free and unfettered»".

One effect of new legislative measures was that the intervention of judicial authorities as observers was much reduced; the task fell instead on local authorities, which Communist supporters had infiltrated in the previous two years.

From the start, state resources were employed in campaigning for the BPD. The numbers cited by Victor Frunză include, among other investments, over 4 million propaganda booklets, 28 million leaflets, 8.6 million printed caricatures, 2.7 million signs, and over 6.6 million posters.

=== Army ===
There is evidence that the Army was a main agent of both political campaigning and the eventual fraud. In order to counteract malcontent in military ranks caused by serious housing and supply issues, as well as the high level of inflation, the Groza cabinet increased their revenues and supplies preferentially. In January, Army agitprop sections of the "Education, Culture and Propaganda" Directorate (Direcția Superioară pentru Educație, Cultură și Propagandă a Armatei, or ECP), already employed in channeling political messages inside military ranks, were authorized to carry out "educational activities" outside of the facilities and in rural areas. PNȚ and PNL activists were barred entry to Army bases, while the ECP closely supervised soldiers who supported the opposition, and repeatedly complained about the "political backwardness" and "liberties in voting" of various Army institutions. While several Army officials guaranteed that their subordinates would vote for the BPD unanimously, low-ranking members occasionally expressed criticism over the violent quelling of PNȚ and PNL–Brătianu activities inside Army units.

Eventually, as the institution made use of its venues to campaign for the BPD, it encountered hostility. At a time when the airplanes of the Romanian Air Force were used to drop pro-Groza leaflets over the city of Brașov, EPC activists were alarmed to find out that the manifestos had been secretly replaced with PNȚ–Maniu propaganda.

The Army was assigned its own Electoral Commission, placed under the leadership of two notoriously pro-Soviet generals, Nicolae Cambrea and Mihail Lascăr, both of whom had formerly served in Red Army units of Romanian volunteers. This drew unanswered protests from the opposition, who called for another Commission to be appointed. By the time of the election, the Groza cabinet decided not to allow reserve and recently discharged soldiers to vote at special Army stations, in order to prevent "tainting" the "real results". In one report from Cluj County, General Precup Victor stated that:

An electoral section for the military in Cluj [...] almost declared the voting invalid, citing for reason that the election was declared over between 6 and 7 o'clock, instead of 8 o'clock, as was required by law. [...] It is only due to the immediate and energetic intervention of the prefect, [with] Major Nicolae Haralambie, and yours truly that the situation was saved.

In this section, where we believed we had the best comrade president, and thus expected the best result, we received the worst result of all voting stations for the military. [...]

All of this because of the attitude of Comrade Petrovici [the section president]. If this section had not existed or if Comrade Petrovici, as its president, had listened to us, the army would have yielded a 99% result and not 92.06, as it came to be in Cluj."

Immediately after the elections, pro-Communist General Victor Precup, commander of the Fourth Army Corps, ordered the arrest of General Gheorghe Drăgănescu of the Second Division of Vânători de munte in Dej, alleging that, during the voting, he exaggerated the extent of unrest among local peasant population in Dej, which was engaged in Antisemitic and Anti-Hungarian violence, as a means to draw the interest of central authorities and Western Allied supervisors. In a secret note released at the same time, General Precup admitted that violent incidents against the government and its supporters had been occurring, and that the Army had been sent in to intervene. He also admitted that local supporters of the PNȚ–Maniu were upset with the official results.

=== Other testimonies ===
Writing at the time, the academic Constantin Rădulescu-Motru, who had his electoral rights suspended due to wartime membership of the Romanian-German Association, reported rumours that authorities had been arbitrarily preventing people from voting, that many voters were not asked for their documents, and that electoral lists marked with the Sun symbol of the BPD had been shoved into urns before voting began. Such a rumour was that:

Trucks filled with voters [of the BPD] traveled from one section to the other and voted in all sections, that is to say several times. After voting, blank forms of official reports [by observers] were sent to the central commission, and they were filled in by adding the number of votes desired by the government".

According to Anton Rațiu and Nicolae Betea, two collaborators of Lucrețiu Pătrășcanu, the elections in Arad County were organized by a group of 40 people (including Belu Zilber and Anton Golopenția); the president of the county electoral commission collected the votes from local stations and was required to read them aloud—irrespective of the option expressed, he called out the names of BPD candidates (Pătrășcanu and Ion Vincze, together with others). Nicolae Betea stated that the overall results for the BPD in Arad County, officially recorded at 58%, were closer to 20%.

Throughout the country, voting bulletins were set fire to immediately after the official counting was completed, an action which prevented all alternative investigation.

== Results ==
Party or alliance		Votes	%	Seats
Bloc of Democratic Parties	Romanian Social Democratic Party	4,773,689	69.77	81
Bloc of Democratic Parties	National Liberal Party–Tătărescu	4,773,689	69.77	75
Bloc of Democratic Parties	Ploughmen's Front	4,773,689	69.77	70
Bloc of Democratic Parties	Romanian Communist Party	4,773,689	69.77	68
Bloc of Democratic Parties	National Popular Party	4,773,689	69.77	26
Bloc of Democratic Parties	National Peasants' Party–Alexandrescu	4,773,689	69.77	20
Bloc of Democratic Parties	Jewish Democratic Committee	4,773,689	69.77	1
Bloc of Democratic Parties	Other parties	4,773,689	69.77	6
National Peasants' Party–Maniu		881,304	12.88	33
Hungarian People's Union		568,862	8.31	29
National Liberal Party		259,068	3.79	3
Democratic Peasants' Party–Lupu		161,314	2.36	2
Independent Social Democratic Party		65,528	0.96	0
Other parties		132,162	1.93	0
Total		6,841,927	100.00	414
Valid votes		6,841,927	98.66	
Invalid votes		92,656	1.34	
Total votes		6,934,583	100.00	
Registered voters/turnout		7,792,542	88.99	
Source: Nohlen & Stöver

=== Alternative results ===
Sometime after the elections, the PCR issued a confidential report called "Lessons from the Elections and the C[ommunist] P[arty]'s Tasks after the Victory of 19 November 1946" (Învățămintele alegerilor și sarcinile PC după victoria din 19 Noiembrie 1946, Arhiva MApN, fond Materiale documentare diverse, dosar 1.742, f.12–13). It was compared by historian Petre Țurlea with the official version, and provides essentially different data on the results. Analyzing the report, Țurlea contended that, overall, the BPD actually won between 44.98% and 47% of the vote. This not only contradicted the official results, but also opposition claims that they actually won as much as 80% of the vote. In Țurlea's interpretation, the result, although coming at the end of fraudulent elections, could be counted as a victory of the opposition.

The report also confirms that the BPD's popularity had been much higher in the urban areas than with the peasantry, while, despite expectations, women in the villages, under the influence of the priests, preferred voting for the PNȚ. While securing the votes of the state apparatus and the Jewish petite bourgeoisie, the BPD was not able to make notable gains inside the categories of traditional PNȚ supporters.

== Reactions ==
Later the same month, the British government of Clement Attlee, represented by Adrian Holman, issued a note informing Foreign Minister Gheorghe Tătărescu that, due to the numerous infringements, it did not recognize the result of elections in Romania.

In his 4 January 1947 conversation with the United States Secretary of State George Marshall, Romania's Ambassador Mihai Ralea received an official American reproach for having "broken the spirit and letter" of the Moscow Conference and the Yalta Agreement. Although Ralea, a Ploughmen's Front member and possibly an ally of the Communists, expressed concern over the fact that the United States were reproving Romania, he also appealed to the United States not to allow the country to be left behind the Iron Curtain. In August 1946, Berry attested that Groza intended to tighten connections with the other countries in the Balkans and Eastern Europe, as the basis for a customs union. Giurescu compares this with the plan of a federation between Bulgaria and Yugoslavia, advocated by Georgi Dimitrov and Josip Broz Tito, which was frustrated by the opposition of Joseph Stalin, and discarded altogether following the Tito-Stalin Split.

== Aftermath ==
The election results effectively confirmed Romania's adherence to the Eastern Bloc and Soviet camp in the erupting Cold War. On 19 November the three opposition parties (the National Peasants' Party–Maniu, the National Liberal Party–Brătianu and Constantin Titel Petrescu's splinter group from the Social Democrats) issued a formal protest, accusing the Groza government of having falsified the vote. Cabinet representatives of the two contender parties, the PNL–Brătianu's Mihail Romniceanu and the PNŢ–Maniu's Emil Hațieganu withdrew in protest soon after results were announced. Petre Ţurlea contends that the document was largely inconsequential due to the interwar tradition of similar protests for less problematic votes.

On 1 December 1946, Premier Groza inaugurated the new unicameral Parliament. In his speech on the occasion, while expressing a hope that elections had voted in a new type of legislative, he stressed that it was important

to eliminate the spectacle of useless blabber and personal issues from this Assembly and for these deputies to dedicate themselves, during the rather expensive session [...] to an intensive activity.

According to Groza:

it is not the Parliament of old politicians, it is not a luxurious habit, an entertainment, an exercise of political gymnastics or an excuse for quarreling with others.

In following months, Communists concentrated on silencing opposition and ensuring a monopoly on power. In summer 1947, the Tămădău Affair saw the end of the PNȚ–Maniu, banned after Iuliu Maniu and others were prosecuted during a show trial. The National Liberal Party-Tătărescu, which issued a critique of the Groza administration at around the same time, was forced out of the government and from the BPD, only to be implicated in the Tămădău scandal and have its leadership replaced with one more loyal to the PCR. The PCR ultimately merged with the PSD in late 1947 to form the Romanian Workers' Party (PMR), with the first dominating the leadership of the united party. According to journalist Victor Frunză, for all intents and purposes, the PCR half's dominance was so great that the PMR was merely the PCR under a new name.

In the last days of December 1947, King Michael I was pressured into abdication. The Communist-dominated legislature then abolished the monarchy and proclaimed Romania a "people's republic," marking the first stage of undisguised Communist rule in Romania.
