= Federation of Socialist Parties from Romania =

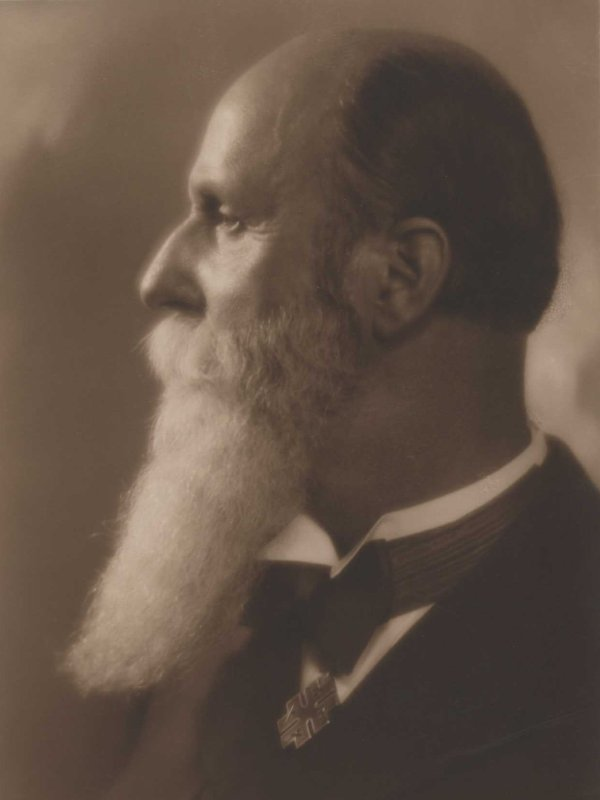
Gheorghe Grigorovici, Romanian politician, leader of the Social Democratic Party,

The Federation of Socialist Parties from Romania (Romanian: Federaţia Partidelor Socialiste din România, FPSR) was a political alliance in Romania.

== History ==
In the 1922 elections it won a single seat in the Chamber of Deputies. However, it did not contest any further elections. In 1927 it was succeeded by the Romanian Social Democratic Party.

== Electoral history ==
=== Legislative elections ===
Election	Votes	%	Assembly	Senate	Position
1922			1 / 372	0 / 148	10th
