= National Liberal Party (Romania, 1875) =

National Liberal Party Partidul Național Liberal
- Electoral symbols used by the PNL, with date of introduction
- Abbreviation: PNL
- Founders: Ion C. Brătianu; Ion Ghica; Mihail Kogălniceanu; C.A. Rosetti
- Founded: 24 May 1875
- Dissolved: 1947 (Note: Brătianu faction); 1950 (Note: Tătărescu/Bejan faction)
- Succeeded by: National Liberal Party (1990)
- Newspaper: Românul (1875–84); Voinţa naţională (1884–1914); Viitorul (1914–38, 1944–45); Liberalul (1946–47); Drapelul (1944–48)
- Youth wing: National Liberal Youth
- Ideology: Liberalism (Romanian); National liberalism; Romanian nationalism; 1875–1920: Antisemitism; Factions: Radicalism; Left-wing populism; Conservative liberalism; Liberal conservatism; Democratic socialism (from 1900)
- Political position: 1875–1920: Centre-left; 1920–1947: Centre-right
- Slogan: Prin noi înșine! (Through ourselves alone!)

The National Liberal Party (Romanian: Partidul Național Liberal, PNL) was the first organised political party in modern Romania and the preeminent political force in the country from its establishment in 1875 until its forced dissolution by the Communist regime in 1947. Functioning as the primary architect of the Romanian state, the party oversaw the country’s most significant milestones, including the achievement of full independence, the transition to a constitutional monarchy, and the country's early industrialization. For much of the pre-World War I era, it served as the "liberal" pole of a stable two-party system, representing the rising urban middle class against the agrarian-focused Conservative Party.

Following the First World War, the PNL proved more resilient than its traditional rivals, successfully navigating the transition to a mass electorate and the administrative challenges of a vastly expanded territory. As the chief designer of the 1923 Constitution, the party established a highly centralized institutional framework intended to unify the diverse provinces of Greater Romania. While it championed modernization and state-led economic development, its long periods of dominance were often criticized for "administrative" control over the electoral process and a rigid centralization that prioritized Bucharest-led interests. Despite the rise of competing peasant and radical movements, the PNL remained the definitive "party of government" and the guardian of the Brătianu family’s political legacy until the collapse of the democratic order in the late 1930s.

After the 1989 Revolution, the party re-emerged as a major political force in post-communist Romania. Re-founded in 1990 by survivors of the historical party, the modern PNL reclaimed its liberal heritage and established itself as a leading center-right alternative, eventually becoming a key driver of the country's integration into NATO and the European Union.

== History ==
=== The Roots and Consolidation of Romanian Liberalism ===
Before its formal consolidation, Romanian liberalism existed as a fragmented landscape of "radical" and "moderate" factions, deeply rooted in the revolutionary generation of the mid-19th century. The movement’s early ideological foundations were laid by figures such as Ion Câmpineanu, who challenged the restrictive Regulamentul Organic in the 1830s, followed by the "Reds" (Roșii) who spearheaded the 1848 Wallachian Revolution. Following the Union of the Principalities in 1859, these groups remained loosely organized around local political clubs and influential journals like Românul.

The turning point arrived in May 1875 with the formation of the "Coalition of Mazar Pașa", a landmark alliance brokered at the Bucharest residence of Sir Stephen Lakeman, a British-Ottoman officer. This pivotal consolidation successfully bridged the rift between the radical leadership of Ion C. Brătianu and C. A. Rosetti and the moderate factions, transforming decades of revolutionary fervor into a disciplined, unified political front.

=== Development and early governance (1875–1918) ===
The National Liberal Party was founded on May 24, 1875, as a unified force against Conservative rule, integrating various liberal factions into a cohesive national structure. Led by prominent figures such as Ion C. Brătianu, Mihail Kogălniceanu, Ion Ghica, and C. A. Rosetti, the party primarily represented the interests of Romania's nascent local bourgeoisie. Until World War I, the PNL and the Conservative Party maintained a de facto two-party system within a political framework that severely limited the representation of the peasant majority through census suffrage.

During the reign of King Carol I, the PNL functioned as the left-leaning counterpart to the right-wing Conservatives; while the latter represented the landed aristocracy and high bourgeoisie, the PNL championed the interests of the small bourgeoisie and small property owners. By leveraging radical organizational networks and grassroots propaganda, the party rapidly expanded its reach from urban centers to rural areas. Through this mobilization, the PNL established itself as Romania’s most formidable political force within its first year of operation, setting the stage for its long-term dominance in the country's modernization.

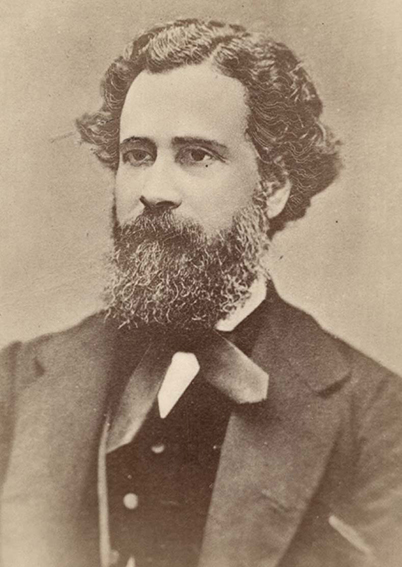
Ion C. Brătianu, one of the founders and longtime leader of PNL

Dominated for much of the pre-communist period by the Brătianu family, the PNL was characterized by both centralized power and recurring factionalism. A significant early split occurred in the late 1880s when co-founder C. A. Rosetti and his followers formed the Radical Party, seeking more extensive social reforms than the PNL leadership. Domestically, the PNL championed the development of a local middle class and the expansion of Romanian industry through a combination of protectionist trade policies and government subsidies. This economic nationalism, famously encapsulated by the slogan "Prin noi înșine!" (Through ourselves alone!), allowed party elites to maintain control over major Romanian-owned enterprises and a significant portion of the local finance sector, including the National Bank of Romania.

The PNL was also defined by a mainstream platform of antisemitism, primarily manifesting in its long-standing opposition to granting citizenship to Romanian Jews. Under the premiership of Ion C. Brătianu, the state enforced discriminatory laws that prohibited Jews from settling in the countryside and labeled many urban Jewish residents as "vagrants" to justify their expulsion. According to the 1905 Jewish Encyclopedia, these policies led to international condemnation after several Jews were reportedly drowned in the Danube during botched deportations. This exclusionary stance persisted under later leaders like Dimitrie Sturdza, who blocked non-Romanians from various social positions and orchestrated the exile of Jewish intellectuals such as Moses Gaster and Lazăr Șăineanu. During this period, even the rival Conservative Party was largely unable to improve the condition of Romanian Jews due to sustained PNL opposition.

At the dawn of the 20th century, the PNL, bolstered by former leaders of the Social Democratic Workers' Party of Romania, began advocating for electoral franchise expansion and limited agrarian reform. However, this progressive lean did not prevent the National Liberal government from violently suppressing the 1907 Peasants' Revolt. In the years leading up to World War I, the party adopted a nationalist and irredentist discourse, championing the cause of ethnic Romanians living outside the borders, primarily those in Transylvania and other Austro-Hungarian territories. While their rhetoric was often pragmatic in office, the PNL's traditional Francophilia placed them at odds with King Carol I, who favored the Central Powers. Under the leadership of Ion I. C. Brătianu, the party was instrumental in Romania's 1916 decision to join the Triple Entente, a move that ultimately resulted in the acquisition of Bessarabia, Bukovina, and Transylvania.

=== Interwar Governance and Policy Shifts ===
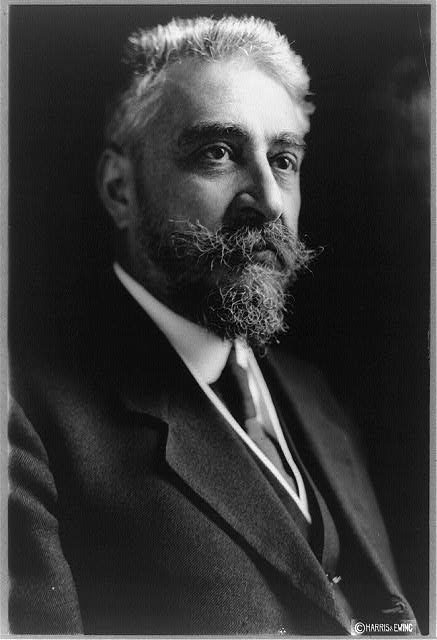
Ion I. C. (Ionel) Brătianu

Unlike its major opponent, the PNL managed to preserve its prominence after the implementation of universal male suffrage, playing an important role in shaping the institutional framework of Greater Romania during the 1920s. The post-war era saw a significant shift in the PNL’s social and administrative agenda. Although Ion I. C. Brătianu initially shared his father’s antisemitic views, the party removed antisemitism from its official program after World War I, eventually forming alliances with Jewish political figures.

Despite this moderation, the PNL viewed the post-war Minority Treaties as an infringement on national sovereignty. Consequently, interwar National Liberal governments pursued a rigid policy of centralization, rejecting autonomy for the newly acquired provinces and working to limit the influence of both national minorities and foreign capital. In foreign affairs, the party supported the cordon sanitaire to contain the Soviet Union, while domestically, it maintained a hardline stance against the local workers' movement and socialist organizations.

1926 electoral map highlighting the landslide victory of the National Liberal Party in that year's legislative election.

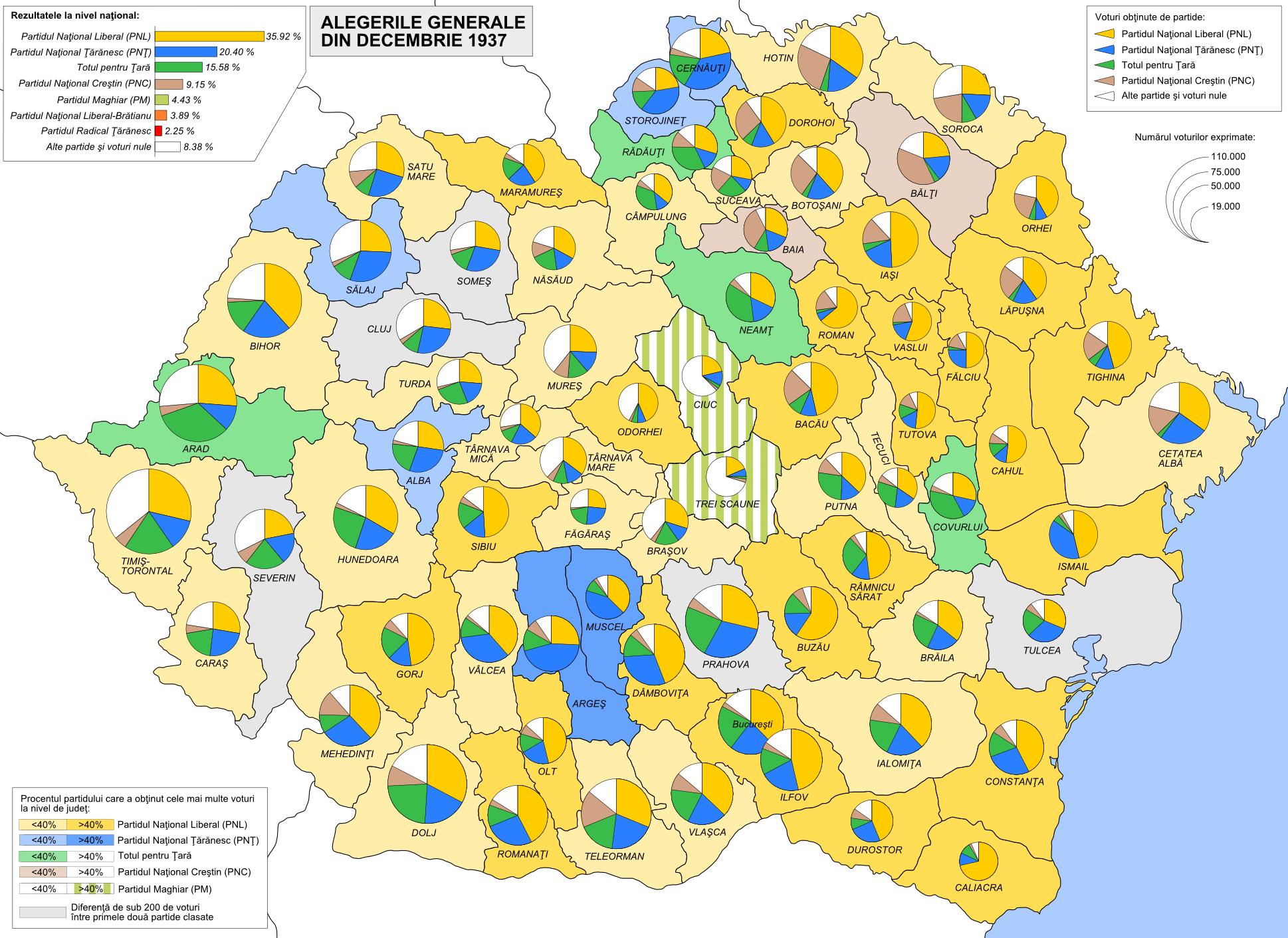
1937 electoral map showcasing the success of the National Liberal Party in that year's legislative election.

During the 1930s, the PNL was defined by its evolving relationship with King Carol II. Although initially opposed to his restoration, the party increasingly supported his authoritarian leanings, eventually paving the way for the royal dictatorship established in 1938. This period was marked by a major split in 1930: Gheorghe I. Brătianu contested Vintilă Brătianu's opposition to the King, creating a parallel organization that claimed the party’s name and legacy. Following Vintilă’s death, his faction, led by Ion G. Duca and later Gheorghe Tătărescu, realigned with the Crown and headed several governments, while Gheorghe’s faction remained in opposition. The two groups only reunited shortly before the 1938 dissolution of all political parties. Though formally disbanded, PNL structures were preserved unofficially, and many members transitioned into Carol’s National Renaissance Front.

=== World War II and the Communist suppression ===
As Nazi Germany’s influence grew, factions within the party, notably those led by Gheorghe I. Brătianu, sought a rapprochement with Berlin starting in 1936. During World War II, PNL leadership supported Romania’s participation in the Axis invasion of the Soviet Union, while simultaneously maintaining back-channel contacts with the Western Allies. This dual strategy culminated in the party backing the 23 August 1944 coup against the Ion Antonescu regime. The PNL joined King Michael I in a broad coalition with the National Peasants', Social Democratic, and Communist parties, successfully overthrowing the dictator during the closing phase of the war. Following a brief reorganization in late 1944, the party participated in post-war 'grand coalition' governments; however, its influence rapidly waned. The emerging Communist-led administration utilized the denazification process to systematically purge PNL supporters from government posts, leading to the party’s eventual marginalization.

In the aftermath of World War II, the PNL suffered one more major split, driven by conflicting approaches toward the rising power of the Romanian Communist Party (PCR). Party president Dinu Brătianu led a faction that staunchly opposed Communist influence and championed Anglo-American interests. Conversely, General Secretary Gheorghe Tătărescu advocated for a pragmatic alliance with the PCR, hoping to maintain a degree of political relevance within the Soviet-dominated political context. This resulted in the creation of parallel organizations, both claiming the National Liberal name and legacy. Faced with increasing state repression, the Dinu Brătianu faction effectively dissolved in late 1947, while many of its members subsequently faced political persecution.

Tătărescu’s faction initially remained within the governing coalitions; however, his opposition to the government's policy of extensive economic planning led to his ousting in November 1947. He was replaced by Petre Bejan, under whom the faction was forced into total submission, eventually ceasing all political activity by 1950. Stripped of their economic base through nationalization and deprived of political rights, National Liberal figures were systematically marginalized or imprisoned during the early Communist era. The PNL remained defunct throughout the decades of single-party rule until the Romanian Revolution of 1989.

== Scissions and mergers ==
=== Parties seceded from PNL ===
- National Liberal Party-Brătianu (1930)
- National Liberal Party–Tătărescu/Bejan (1944)

=== Parties absorbed by PNL ===
- National Liberal Party-Brătianu (1938)

== Party leaders ==
Also served as Prime Minister

| Nº | Name Born - Died | Portrait | Term start | Term end | Duration |
|---|---|---|---|---|---|
| 1 | Ion C. Brătianu (1821–1891) | | 24 May 1875 | 4 May 1891 | 15 years, 345 days |
| 2 | Dimitrie Brătianu (1818–1892) | | 21 May 1891 | 8 June 1892 | 1 year, 18 days |
| 3 | Dimitrie Sturdza (1833–1914) | | 20 November 1892 | 10 January 1909 | 16 years, 51 days |
| 4 | Ion I. C. Brătianu (1864–1927) | | 11 January 1909 | 24 November 1927 | 18 years, 317 days |
| 5 | Vintilă Brătianu (1867–1930) | | 24 November 1927 | 21 December 1930 | 3 years, 27 days |
| 6 | Ion G. Duca (1879–1933) | | 28 December 1930 | 29 December 1933 | 3 years, 1 day |
| 7 | Dinu Brătianu (1866–1950) | | 4 January 1934 | November 1947 | 13 years, 301 days |

== Electoral history ==
=== Legislative elections ===
| Election | Votes | % | Assembly | Senate | Position | Aftermath^{[a]} |
|---|---|---|---|---|---|---|
| 1876 | —N/a | —N/a | —N/a | —N/a | —N/a | PNL government (1876–1879) |
| 1879 | —N/a | —N/a | —N/a | —N/a | —N/a | PNL government (1879–1883) |
| 1883 | —N/a | —N/a | —N/a | —N/a | —N/a | PNL government (1883–1884) |
| 1884 | —N/a | —N/a | —N/a | —N/a | —N/a | PNL government (1884–1888) |
| 1888 | —N/a | —N/a | —N/a | —N/a | —N/a | Opposition to PC government (1888–1891) |
| 1891 | —N/a | —N/a | 60 / 183 | —N/a | —N/a | Supporting PC government (1891–1892) |
| 1892 | —N/a | —N/a | 32 / 183 | 18 / 112 | 2nd | Opposition to PC government (1892–1895) |
| 1895 | —N/a | —N/a | 177 / 183 | —N/a | 1st | PNL government (1895–1899) |
| 1899 | —N/a | —N/a | —N/a | —N/a | —N/a | Opposition to PC government (1899–1901) |
| 1901 | —N/a | —N/a | —N/a | —N/a | —N/a | PNL government (1901–1905) |
| 1905 | —N/a | —N/a | —N/a | —N/a | —N/a | PNL government (1905–1906) |
| 1905 | —N/a | —N/a | —N/a | —N/a | —N/a | Opposition to PC government (1906–1907) |
| 1907 | —N/a | —N/a | 166 / 183 | 90 / 102 | 1st | PNL government (1907–1910) |
| 1911 | 81,139^{[b]} | 37.8 | 10 / 183 | 16 / 110 | 2nd | Opposition to PC government (1910–1912) |
| 1912 | —N/a | —N/a | 35 / 183 | 24 / 110 | 3rd | Opposition to PC government (1912–1914) |
| 1914 | —N/a | —N/a | 145 / 188 | 82 / 117 | 1st | PNL government (1914–1918) |
| 1918 | did not compete | | 0 / 174 | 0 / 112 | – | Extra-parliamentary opposition to PC government (1918) |
| 1918 | did not compete | | 0 / 174 | 0 / 112 | – | PNL government (1918–1919) |
| 1919 | —N/a | —N/a | 103 / 568 | 54 / 216 | 2nd | Opposition to PNR government (1919–1920) |
| 1920 | —N/a | —N/a | 16 / 372 | 1 / 166 | 3rd | Opposition to PP government (1920–1921) |
| 1922 | —N/a | —N/a | 222 / 372 | 111 / 148 | 1st | PNL government (1922–1926) |
| 1926 | 192,399 | 7.5 | 16 / 387 | 0 / 115 | 3rd | Opposition to PP government (1926–1927) |
| 1927 | 1,704,435 | 62.7 | 318 / 387 | 92 / 113 | 1st | PNL government (1927–1928) |
| 1928 | 185,939 | 6.7 | 13 / 387 | 0 / 110 | 2nd | Opposition to PNȚ government (1928–1931) |
| 1928 | 185,939 | 6.7 | 13 / 387 | 0 / 110 | 2nd | Supporting PND minority government (1931) |
| 1931 | 1,389,901^{[c]} | 48.9 | 80 / 387 | 11 / 113 | 1st | Supporting PND minority government (1931–1932) |
| 1931 | 1,389,901^{[c]} | 48.9 | 80 / 387 | 11 / 113 | 1st | Opposition to PNȚ government (1932) |
| 1932 | 407,023 | 14 | 28 / 387 | 1 / 113 | 2nd | Opposition to PNȚ government (1932–1933) |
| 1933 | 1,518,864 | 52 | 300 / 387 | 105 / 108 | 1st | PNL government (1933–1937) |
| 1937 | 1,103,353 | 36.5 | 152 / 387 | 97 / 113 | 1st | Opposition to PNC minority government (1937–1938) |
| Parliament suspended | | | | | | Extra-parliamentary opposition to Miron Cristea's monarchist government (1938–1939) |
| 1939 | party banned | | 0 / 258 | 0 / 88 | – | Extra-parliamentary opposition to FRN monarchist government (1939–1940) |
| Parliament suspended | | | | | | Extra-parliamentary opposition to LAM fascist government (1940–1941) |
| Parliament suspended | | | | | | Extra-parliamentary opposition to Ion Antonescu's military government (1941–1944) |
| Parliament suspended | | | | | | FND-PNL-PNȚ government (1944–1945) |
| Parliament suspended | | | | | | Extra-parliamentary opposition to FND government (1945–1946) |
| 1946 | 259,068 | 3.8 | 3 / 414 | Senate abolished | 4th | Opposition to BPD government (1946–1947) |

Notes:

^{a} Almost always the government was named before parliamentary elections and confirmed afterwards;
^{b} Votes received in alliance with PCD;
^{c} Votes received by National Union coalition. Coalition members: PNL, PGR, LA, and PND.
