= Burton Y. Berry =

American diplomat (1901–1985)

Personal details
- Born: Burton Yost Berry; August 31, 1901 Fowler, Indiana
- Died: August 22, 1985 (aged 83) Zürich, Switzerland
- Education: Indiana University; Collège de Sorbonne
- Occupation: Diplomat

Burton Yost Berry (August 31, 1901 – August 22, 1985) was an American diplomat and art collector.

Berry was born in Fowler, Indiana. He graduated from Indiana University Bloomington with a bachelor's degree in 1923 and a master's degree in 1927, both in political science. In 1928 he joined the United States Foreign Service. Berry served as Vice-Consul to Istanbul from 1929 to 1931, Consul to Athens in 1938, Istanbul 1943, Bucharest in 1944, Director of the State Department's Office of African, South Asian and Near East Affairs in 1947, Budapest in 1948, and as Ambassador to Iraq from 1952 to 1954. He then retired, and lived in Istanbul, Beirut, Cairo and finally in Zürich.

Early on in his career, Berry began to collect Middle Eastern textiles coins, gems, jewelry and other antiques. The textiles collection was donated to the Art Institute of Chicago. Many of the coins were donated to the American Numismatic Society. Much of the rest were donated to the Indiana University Art Museum.
