= 1926 Romanian general election =

Map of results by first placed party by constituency

General elections were held in Romania in May and June 1926. The Chamber of Deputies was elected on 25 May, whilst the Senate was elected in two stages in May and 10 June. The result was a victory for the governing People's Party, which, together with the allied Romanian National Party (as revived by Vasile Goldiș), Magyar Party and German Party, won 292 of the 387 seats in the Chamber of Deputies and 107 of the 115 seats in the Senate elected through universal male vote. With some exceptions, the Peasants' Party and the main branch of the Romanian National Party ran on common lists under the name of National Peasant Bloc.

== Results ==
=== Chamber of Deputies ===
Party	Votes	%	Seats	+/–
People's Party-led alliance	1,366,160	53.38	292	+279
National Peasant Bloc	727,202	28.42	69	New
National Liberal Party	192,399	7.52	16	–206
National-Christian Defense League	124,778	4.88	10	New
Social Democrats	40,594	1.59	0	New
Peasant Workers' Bloc	39,203	1.53	0	New
Romanian National Party	37,672	1.47	0	New
Peasants' Party	16,824	0.66	0	–40
Civic Union	7,300	0.29	0	New
Traders Council	1,861	0.07	0	New
Other parties	5,096	0.20	0	–
Total	2,559,089	100.00	387	+15
Valid votes	2,559,089	97.58		
Invalid/blank votes	63,476	2.42		
Total votes	2,622,565	100.00		
Registered voters/turnout	3,496,814	75.00		
Source: Sternberger et al., Nohlen & Stöver

=== Senate ===
Party	Seats	+/–
People's Party-led alliance	107	+105
National Peasant Bloc	8	New
Total	115	–33
Source: Sternberger et al., Nohlen & Stöver
