= Dumitru Petrescu =

Romanian politician (1906–1969)

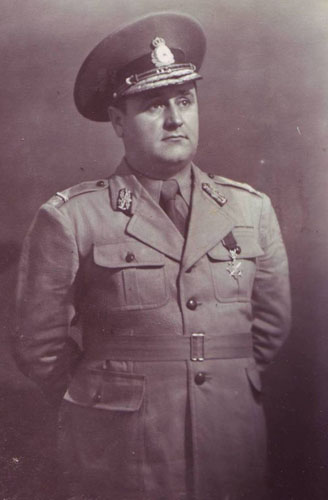
- Petrescu in military uniform

Deputy Prime Minister of Romania
- In office 4 October 1955 – 11 May 1956

Romanian Minister of Finance
- In office 9 March 1952 – 4 October 1955
- Preceded by: Vasile Luca
- Succeeded by: Manea Mănescu

Chairman of the Great National Assembly
- In office 5 July – 28 December 1949
- Preceded by: Constantin Pîrvulescu
- Succeeded by: Alexandru Drăghici
- In office 26 January – 29 May 1950
- Preceded by: Alexandru Drăghici
- Succeeded by: Constantin Doncea

Member of the Great National Assembly
- In office March 1948 – November 1952
- Constituency: Gorj County
- In office 30 November 1952 – July 1956
- Constituency: Tîrgu Jiu
- In office 2 March 1969 – 13 September 1969
- Constituency: Libertății Park

Personal details
- Born: Gheorghe M. Dumitru; 10 May 1906 Bucharest, Kingdom of Romania
- Died: 13 September 1969 (aged 63) Karlovy Vary, Czech Socialist Republic, Czechoslovak Socialist Republic
- Resting place: Libertății Park Mausoleum, Bucharest
- Party: Romanian Communist Party (c. 1932–1956; 1965–1969)
- Other political affiliations: Union of Communist Youth (c. 1922); Romanian Social Democratic Party (1927–1928); Socialist Workers Party of Romania (1928–1930); People's Democratic Front (1948–1952); Front of Socialist Unity (1968–1969)
- Spouse: Ecaterina Petrescu
- Education: International Lenin School
- Occupation: Metalworker; soldier; propagandist; civil servant; sports executive
- Awards: Order of Michael the Brave, 3rd class (1947); Ordinul Muncii, 2nd class (1949); Czechoslovak War Cross; Order of the Red Star; "For the Victory" Medal
- Nicknames: Petrescu-Grivița; Petrusin

Military service
- Allegiance: Soviet Union; Kingdom of Romania; Romanian People's Republic
- Branch/service: Tudor Vladimirescu Division; Horea, Cloșca și Crișan Division; Romanian Land Forces
- Years of service: 1943–1949
- Rank: Major general
- Battles/wars: World War II; Battle of Romania; Battle of Debrecen

Dumitru Petrescu, believed to have been born Gheorghe M. Dumitru, also known as Gheorghe Petrescu and Petrescu-Grivița (10 May 1906 – 13 September 1969), was a Romanian general, trade union leader, and Communist Party (PCR) activist. After training as a metalworker in Grivița, he took to left-wing politics, joining the underground communist groups at some point before the railwaymen's strike of February 1933, which he helped organise together with Constantin Doncea and Gheorghe Vasilichi. Arrested by the Romanian Kingdom authorities in its wake, he received a 15-year prison sentence. He broke out of Craiova penitentiary a few months later, together with Vasilichi and Doncea, after overpowering a guard. With support from the International Red Aid, Petrescu made his way into Czechoslovakia, and then headed for the Soviet Union, where he lived until 1944. He worked in publishing and trained as a propagandist at the International Lenin School in Moscow.

During World War II, Petrescu was acknowledged as a member of the PCR's exile, or "Muscovite", faction, which gravitated around Ana Pauker. He helped rallying up Romanian prisoners of war for the Red Army's Tudor Vladimirescu and Horea, Cloșca și Crișan Divisions, emerging as a political commissar and lieutenant colonel. He had a mainly political role in the Soviet conquest of Romania, upon which he was integrated into the Romanian Land Forces, serving as a coordinator of cultural and propaganda efforts, leading toward their transformation into the Romanian people's army. He followed the Romanian army and the Vladimirescu units as they crossed into Northern Transylvania and Hungary, recording his troops' initial bravery and subsequent breakdown during the Battle of Debrecen. Although promoted to major general in 1948, and assigned seats in the Great National Assembly and the Central Committee, Petrescu was pushed aside by the Romanian People's Republic; he had only a brief involvement in the collectivisation of agriculture, as part of a commission that also included Pauker. His marginalisation occurred largely because the communist leader, Gheorghe Gheorghiu-Dej, had a more modest pedigree in the railways movement than either Petrescu or Doncea, and as such resented their visibility.

Petrescu displayed his loyalty in 1952, when he assisted Gheorghiu-Dej in toppling Pauker and her "Muscovites"; he himself was Minister of Finance in 1952–1955, replacing the disgraced "Muscovite" Vasile Luca. His administrative career peaked in 1955–1956, when he served as deputy prime minister. Outspoken in his criticism of Gheorghiu-Dej, Petrescu was identified as belonging to a "Doncea group" of factionalists, and expelled from the party in July 1956. He returned to favour in 1965, when Gheorghiu-Dej had died and Nicolae Ceaușescu, as the new general secretary, had introduced a more liberal political line. Reinstated and allowed back on the Central Committee, Petrescu served in various administrative positions, before emerging as vice-president Front of Socialist Unity (in 1968) and of the State Council (in 1969). Already terminally ill with cirrhosis, he died while vacationing in Karlovy Vary; his final assignment had been one of national importance, as a member of the Permanent Presidium of the PCR Politburo. He is remembered as a founding figure of CSA Steaua București and of its football club.

== Biography ==
=== Early career and trials ===
Born to proletarian parents in Bucharest, Petrescu was originally known as Gheorghe Dumitru, before adopting the alias he used in 1933 and throughout life (he was also known under the combined form "Gheorghe Dumitru-Petrescu"). Historian Dan Gîju reports that his exact name may be ultimately unknown, but that Romanian Police records had him as "Gheorghe M. Dumitru"—with the added initial of his carpenter father; Gîju notes a second alias used by the future general, namely "Petrusin". He was described in PCR propaganda as having "experienced from his early childhood terrible exploitation by the bourgeois-landowning regime"; historian Florin Șperlea describes his childhood as having been spent "in a working-class neighborhood", namely among employees of Căile Ferate Române (CFR, the national railway carrier). Young Dumitru-Petrescu trained as a manual worker. In 1918, he was an apprentice at the CFR yard in Grivița, but transferred to begin training as a printer at Editura Socec (to October 1920). He returned to the CFR as an metalworking lathe operator, fully employed there from October 1920 to August 1928. During that interval, he was listed as a trusted operative by the Union of Communist Youth, which he reportedly joined in 1922. His four-grade education was supplemented by night school, earning him a diploma in secondary-level commercial studies.

According to at least one account, Petrescu joined the fledgling PCR in 1924, and stayed with it after it was outlawed that same year; journalist Paula Mihailov suggests that he only joined in 1932. Petrescu's official records also suggests that he was a member of the Romanian Social Democratic Party (PSDR) in 1927–1928, and that he then joined the Socialist Workers Party of Romania, with which he was still affiliated in October 1930; in these sources, his PCR membership is precisely dated to July 1932. By then, he had also affiliated with the "unitary trade union"—of which he was a general secretary from 1928.

In early 1933, at the height of the Great Depression, Petrescu helped to organise the Grivița strike, as a leader of the Bucharest union council; this was the culmination of efforts that began in 1932, when Petrescu, together with Gheorghe Vasilichi and Constantin Doncea, considered making pushes for a general strike. A report by Siguranța agents suggests that non-communist members of the Grivița union regarded Petrescu and the others as their fellow workers, seeing them more favourably than "actual communists" such as Petre Gheorghe. A participant in the events, Vasile Bâgu, recalled in 1958 that Petrescu was involved in a warning strike of 28 January–2 February 1933, when he and Doncea, alongside Petre Gheorghe and Hugo Barani, were elected to a committee which presented the workers' demands to the CFR management.

PCR records report that, on the evening of 13 February, Petrescu, Gheorghe Gheorghiu-Dej, Nicolae Goldberger and Gheorghe Stoica were present at a conspiratorial meeting of the "communist faction" within the trade-union coalition. Held on Hagi Tudorache Street near Herăstrău, it supposedly "established measures which imposed themselves [...] after government had refused to acknowledge progress made by the strikers on 2 February, and had sealed of the revolutionary unions' house." The Siguranța was immediately informed when, on the night of 13–14 February 1933, Petrescu and Doncea met with Barani and Chivu Stoica to give the signal for a revolutionary strike action, planned for 15 February. Petrescu was arrested later on 14 February, alongside both Doncea and Vasilichi. This did not prevent the limited strike: the workers were pushed to more radical positions "upon hearing that their union leaders had been arrested", and would not conduct negotiations. Prime Minister Alexandru Vaida-Voevod ordered a storming of Grivița by two regiments of the Land Forces, during which seven strikers were killed.

Petrescu was formally charged on 6 June. His prosecutor, Tiberiu Bărdescu, included him on a list of 58 main culprits, alleged by him to have "instigated the strike and rebellion." He was moved with his co-defendants between prisons—Jilava, Văcărești, and ultimately Craiova. Sociologist Vladimir Tismăneanu argues that Petrescu also spent time in Doftana Prison, where he became a supporter of Gheorghiu-Dej, who had also been prosecuted for the Grivița strike, and who was emerging as leader of a PCR faction. During the investigating phase, the authorities realised that grouping Doncea and Petrescu along with other CFR workers held in custody was only helping them diffuse their ideas and consolidate their personal authority. They were separated from other inmates in April. The mass trial began on 17 July 1933 at the military tribunal ("war council") of the 2nd Army Corps, in Bucharest; Petrescu was represented in court by lawyer Iosif Șraier. Witnesses for the defence included a right-wing former minister, Mihail Manoilescu, who argued that the CFR workers had reason to be upset by the violation of their labour rights, as well as by government inaction in their favour.

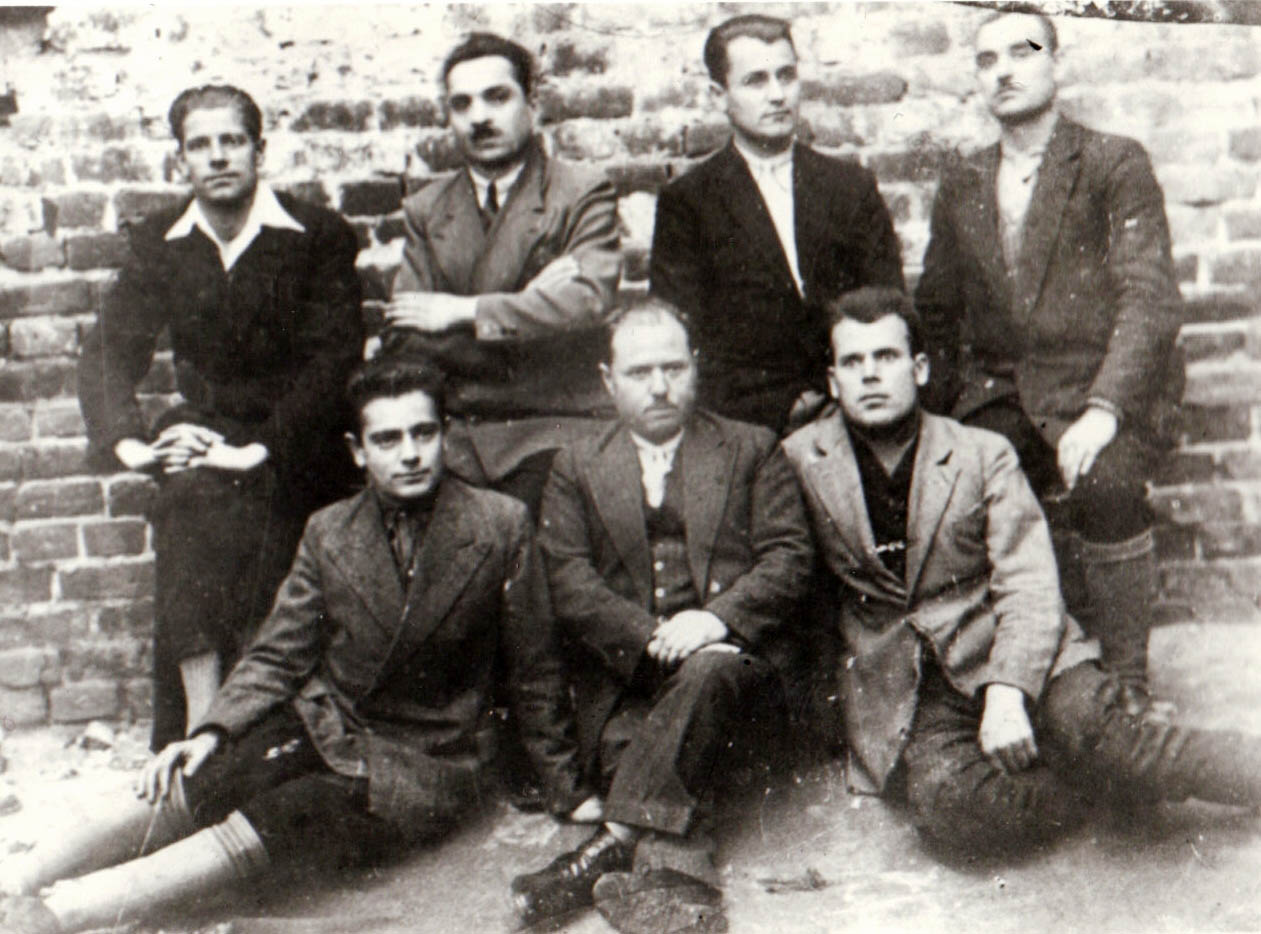
Defendants of the Grivița trials in Craiova Prison yard. Top row, from the left: Gheorghe Vasilichi, Petrescu, Constantin Doncea, Gheorghe Gheorghiu-Dej. Also shown: Chivu Stoica, reclining between Doncea and Gheorghiu-Dej

Petrescu himself was "almost defiant" in his addresses to the court, alleging that his judges were mere lackeys for the government and the ruling classes. Both Doncea and Petrescu initially received life sentences on 19 August 1933, while Vasilichi and Vasile Luca were given 20-year prison sentences (Gheorghiu-Dej received 15 years); all three main organisers obtained a retrial upon judicial review, in March 1934. In various issues between September 1933 and January 1934, the PCR's illegal newspaper, Scânteia, declared that Petrescu and Doncea were victims of "fascist terror", drawing a parallel between their prosecution and the Leipzig Trial in Nazi Germany.

The second trial was opened at Craiova Military Tribunal on 4 June 1934; the presiding judge was coincidentally also named Petrescu. In his coverage of the trial for Adevărul daily, left-wing journalist Alexandru Sahia argued that both Doncea and Dumitru Petrescu had been found guilty of "instigating premeditated murder", but that the charge referred to a co-defendant, Georgescu Ghebosu, who had been accused of distributing cold weapons to the strikers, and of advising them to stand their ground. The issue became especially "delicate" for the Craiova judges, since Ghebosu had since been acquitted. Both Doncea and Petrescu drew compassion with their speeches in court, but their wives were removed from the premises after it was alleged that they were spying on the prosecution. On 1 July, Petrescu was ultimately sentenced to 15 years of hard labour. In his final address, he stated that the strike "was not a rebellion."

=== Prison escape and Soviet relocation ===
Petrescu, Vasilichi and Doncea began plotting their escape in mid 1934. In 1968, Vasilichi recounted that the plan was hatched by the prisoners themselves, then submitted for approval by the PCR and the International Red Aid. According to him, it was only made feasible when they obtained to be transferred out of the Craiova stockade and into the regular prison facility, and then given approval for treatment at Filantropia Hospital of Craiova. They also won the confidence of their one guard, whom Vasilichi knew as "Ghiță", by allowing him to flirt with Craiova's young women, on a number of occasions, while they guarded themselves. The escape took place on 3 January 1935, when Petrescu's wife Ecaterina ultimately arranged for a getaway car to wait them as they went out for a morning walk—"the driver being recognisable for his holding a white flower." One of them would feign sickness, prompting the escort to seek assistance from the driver, upon which the four would overpower Ghiță with a handkerchief dipped in chloroform. They were relieved when, at the preordained moment for their sortie, the prison-warden ordered Ion Stoica to replace Ghiță, whom they had grown to like.

According to Vasilichi's account, it was he who feigned sickness and who used the chloroform—since Petrescu had not managed to use the handkerchief as instructed. Historian Ilarion Țiu questions at least part of Vasilichi's story, noting that all other records show Petrescu as acting sick. He writes: "It appears that this tiny detail mattered within the set of values of 'communist heroism' as a myth, and was a matter of prestige for Vasilichi." In 1956, Petrescu's lawyer Mihail Pompilian reportedly boasted that he had personally handled the affair, noting that Petrescu, Vasilichi and Doncea were scheduled to be treated for syphilis (which none of them really had) at a hospital in Craiova. After bribing their guard, who agreed to be "tied to a tree with his own belt", they fled the scene in a "black car, with a white chrysanthemum", arranged for them by Pompilian. Vasilichi notes that the car ran out of gas while nearing Bucharest, but that Petrescu was able to obtain some from a group of peasants. He and Doncea had subdued Ion Stoica, eventually abandoning him in the area—as Vasilichi recounts, they paid him 3,000 lei as a show of goodwill, rather than as a reward. Stoica was only considered an accomplice because he had lacked the foresight of hiding the money before reporting to the authorities in Bucharest. Stoica's subsequent testimony, which verifies some of these claims, identifies the exact location as being rural Băneasa.

The three fugitives separated from each other, and fled by taxi cabs to different hiding spots in Bucharest; they were given unexpected freedom of movement because Craiova's prison staff did not conceive that they had actually fled, and would not call for a stakeout. They were then transited through various "conspiratorial homes" in Bucharest, receiving material support from the International Red Aid. The authorities eventually apprehended Vintilă Ionescu, who confessed to having driven the getaway car, but would only admit to having been paid for the transport; a prison guard who had seen the car shortly before the escape reported that an unknown fifth man, possibly a PCR adviser, had been waiting in the car with Ionescu. Pompilian recalls that the driver, whom he does not name, was sentenced to two years in jail, while Pompilian himself was never suspected.

Sociologist Pavel Câmpeanu notes that the escape was ultimately organised by the Communist International as a reward for all participants in the Grivița strike. They were invited to find refuge in the Soviet Union—Petrescu and Doncea took up the offer, while Gheorghiu-Dej and Chivu declined it. This version of events is contradicted by Gheorghiu-Dej's associate Alexandru Bârlădeanu: "Perhaps Dej could've escaped as well. I think he didn't do so out of prudence. It may also be that the names of those who had been designated for the escape were rigorously designated from the [party's] central leadership, with Doncea, Vasilichi and Petrescu being seen as more deserving than Dej, when it came to the international communist movement. This difference of status, between, on one hand, Dej, and, on the other, Doncea and Petrescu, generated a sort of friction between them." Historian Sorin Oane sees Gheorghiu-Dej and Chivu as the "great losers of that Grivița '33 moment". The embarrassed authorities soon increased their alert, directly affecting the PCR's prison underground. In February 1935, Siguranța agents descended on communist cells in Galați, obtaining evidence that Gheorghiu-Dej was carrying on with his revolutionary activities from behind bars. As a result, both he and Chivu were dispatched to a harsher prison in Ocnele Mari; they were investigated as accomplices in the escape, but the charges were dropped, for lack of evidence, in September 1936. In Romania, Petrescu left his wife and two young daughters, who were cared for by Pompilian's father.

The escapee settled for a while in Czechoslovakia, but subsequently joined other Romanian communists in Soviet territory. Picked out as more intelligent and less rebellious than Doncea, between 1935 and 1938 he was a student at the International Lenin School in Moscow. In an oral testimony he provided in the 1960s, Petrescu claimed to have been approached by NKVD staff with an offer to join their organisation as an international spy, but that he had declined the offer. He was mainly employed at either the Foreign Languages Publishing House (with Boris Stefanov) or the State Publishing House, until being recruited by the PCR's foreign bureau, and assigned to work for Radio Moscow during the early stages of World War II. Gîju rates his work for that station and in print media as "anti-Romanian propaganda", arguing that Petrescu was "most likely" employed by the Red Army, specifically the 6th Combined Arms Army's political directorate. Unlike other members of the exile communists, he and the other escapees were not targeted by the Great Purge, and therefore outlived much of the PCR's first-generation members.

=== Commissar and Inspector ===
In mid 1941, Operation Barbarossa saw the Soviets entering World War II against the Axis powers, which included Romania—governed at the time by Ion Antonescu. In 1942, Petrescu set up a Romanian-language propaganda newspaper, Graiul Liber. The following year, he was co-opted to organise the Red Army's Tudor Vladimirescu Division (DTV), as a political commissar with the rank of major. As Șperlea writes, this activity included "touring the Romanian prisoner of war camps for a precise reason: to convince them that they should fight alongside the Red Army so as to bring down what they called the 'fascist Antonescian' regime." The goal of "improving anti-fascist work" among the prisoners had been set on 3–4 September 1943, at a conference organised in Krasnogorsk by Petrescu, Ana Pauker, and Gheorghe Stoica. Pauker played a key role in the events: "[she] proposed naming one of the divisions after the Romanian national figure Tudor Vladimirescu and reportedly played a key role in its formation, having convinced the first Romanian officers to take its command." Alongside Colonels Mihail Maltopol and Iacob Teclu, he put out the army newspaper Graiul Nou. In November 1943, after managing to recruit the entire population of a camp into a battalion, he was faced with insubordination by the newly-appointed commander, Boțoacă, who resented the red star insignia added on their Romanian uniforms. Reportedly, Petrescu intervened to have Boțoacă deposed and rearrested.

This period saw Petrescu rallying with the PCR's "Muscovite faction", which had regrouped around Pauker; Câmpeanu argues that Petrescu owed his life to Pauker, who shielded him from active duty on the Eastern Front. Tismăneanu lists Petrescu as a figure from Pauker's inner circle, which elaborated the strategy for a communist takeover in postwar Romania. On 1 December 1943, Petrescu was moved from the DTV to a parallel military unit, which was later known as the Horea, Cloșca și Crișan Division (DHCC), wherein he was a lieutenant colonel, tasked mainly with propaganda work. According to later denunciations, the DHCC commandant, Mihail Lascăr, confided to Petrescu about frustration with communist demands, and specifically with the soldiers' Sovietization: "What do the Russians want? That we shut down all the [military] schools?"

Petrescu returned to his native country with the Red Army, taking part in the Battle of Romania (1944). His units were never engaged in combat against the Romanian Land Forces, largely because of the 23 August coup, which deposed Antonescu and brought Romania under an anti-fascist coalition that included the communists. Petrescu and his staff arrived in Bucharest on 31 August, and immediately restored his links with the internal factions of the PCR. By late September, the DTV was fighting against the Wehrmacht and the Royal Hungarian Army in Northern Transylvania; its outstanding bravery was noted in 1996 by military historian Alesandru D. Duțu. On 29 September, Petrescu was at Holod, writing to Pauker that his unit had behaved "very well", but asking that the PCR intervene to curb Soviet arrogance, as well as to done down perceptions of the DVT as a "communist outfit". He also reported his dissatisfaction that the PCR's branches in Northern Transylvania were "small or even nonexistent."

On 6 October, Petrescu was also saddened by his troops routing in the Battle of Debrecen, with almost half of the 10,000 troops having either deserted or been captured by the enemy. He asked that the DVT be withdrawn from the front for him to reimpose discipline. Another letter, sent from Debrecen on 1 November, records his anger: "a large portion of our volunteers are not here to fight, but to escape the prison camps. [...] I recall with shame that we have lost 70% of our weapons, that one of our battalions would flee if confronted by seven krauts, that soldiers big as mountains were tossing their machine-pistols and running like hell without ever shooting their weapons". Ten days later, he was in Hajdúböszörmény, complaining to Pauker that there was nothing he could do about the continuous spread of "fake news", as long as these came directly from the inner circle of DVT commander Nicolae Cambrea.

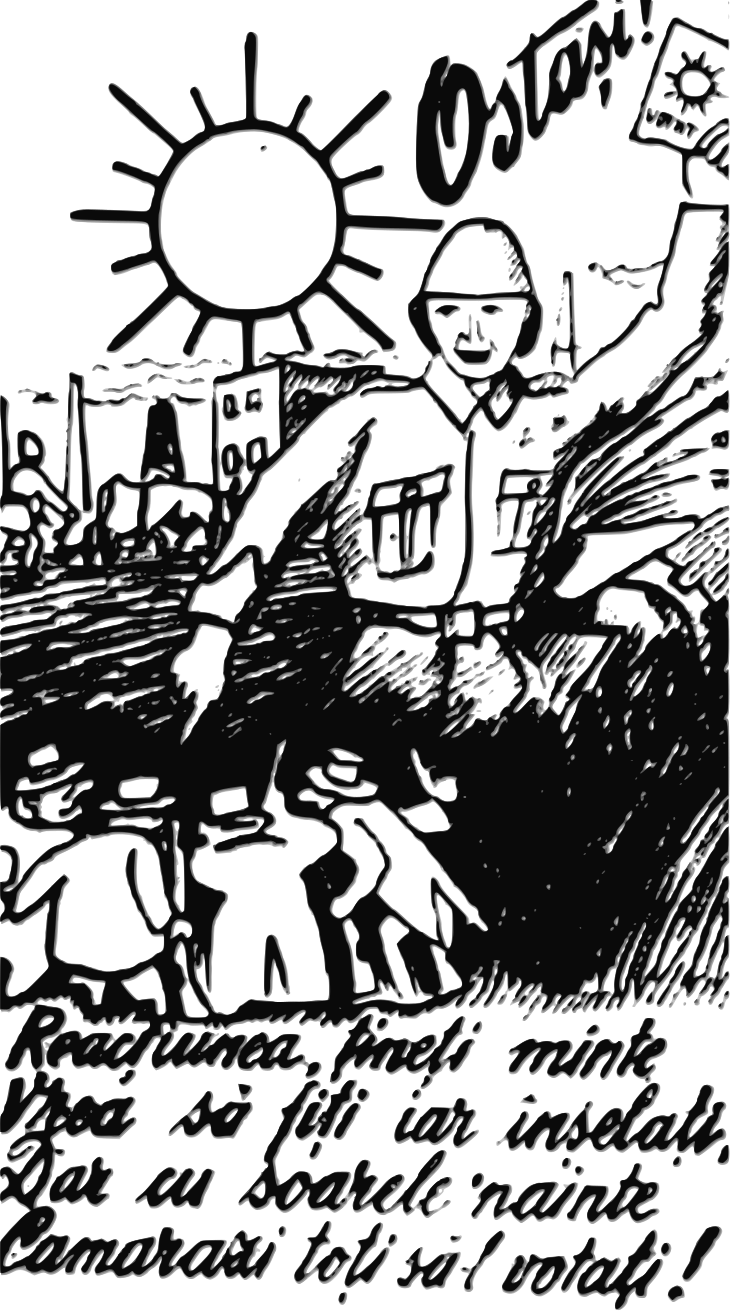
PMR propaganda for the legislative election of November 1946, aimed at soldier voters

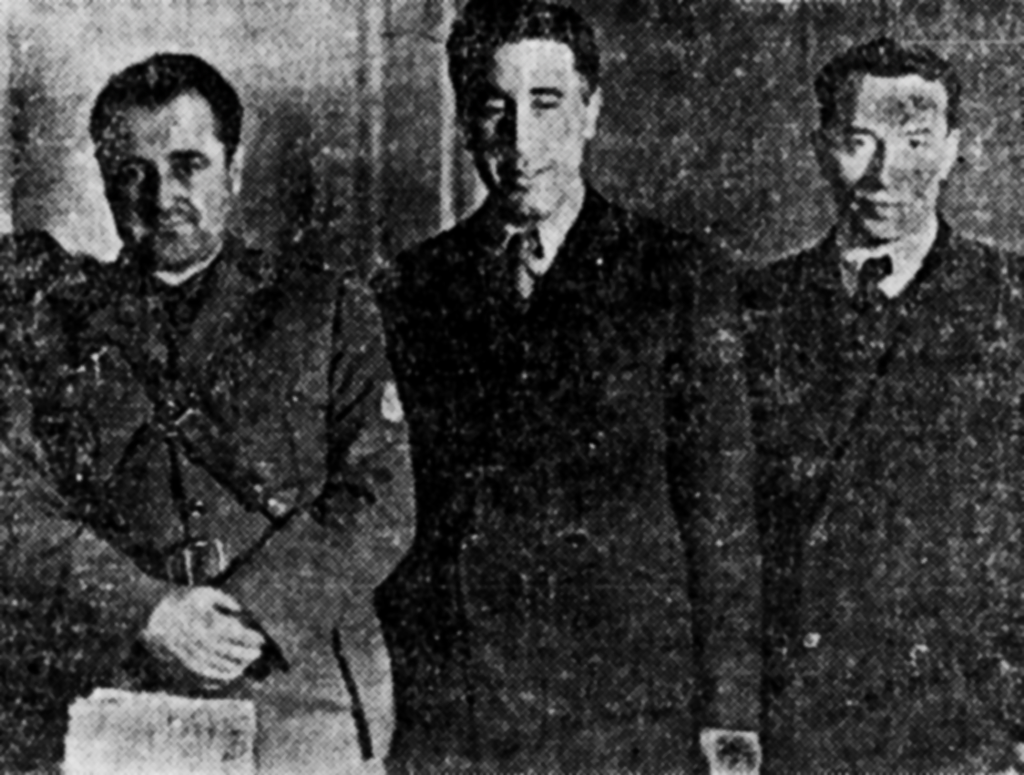
Petrescu (left) at Apărarea Patriotică on 1 January 1945, with his former lawyer Iosif Șraier (center) and Vasile Vaida

Petrescu became involved with Romania's steady communisation, which began with the imposition of a pro-Soviet government on 6 March 1945. Shortly after this event, Petrescu, appointed second-in-command of the DHCC on 12 April, led 1,000 DTV cadres from Debrecen to Bucharest. Upon arrival there, they became the core unit of a "political apparatus", tasked with ensuring ideological control (officially labelled "democratization") over the Land Forces. The new educational institution, which directed the "indoctrination of young Romanian officers", was headquartered in Breaza. As summed up by Șperlea, the process directed by Colonel Victor Precup and Petrescu (as Precup's éminence grise) was effectively a purge of the old military structures, including a reduction of its fighting power—Petrescu's superiors feared that having many armed troops left on Romanian soil would restore "reactionary" rule. Petrescu and Precup had for their end goal "that the Romanian army, a 'nest of reactionaries', no longer act in any other way but 'in service to the people'". Gîju similarly notes that Precup was a less relevant figure than Petrescu, and "mainly there for the artistic impression". The former railwayman and his subordinates, including Valter Neuländer-Roman and Ion Eremia, "did not lack in talent and intelligence, but devoid of scruples [as] standard opportunists, parvenus, and, not least of all, impostors".

Petrescu's own service with the DHCC, within the Land Forces, ended on 9 May 1945. He endured as the army's Inspector for Education, Culture and Propaganda (ECP) and chief editor of the official newspaper Glasul Armatei (1945–1948), being advanced to brigadier general on 14 July 1947. His advancement was championed by Teclu, who insisted that Petrescu, a man "of exceptional intelligence [and] defiant courage", would become "the first worker to have been made general in the Romanian army." According to historian Dennis Deletant, he was a member of the PCR Central Committee in 1946, though his participation there was kept secret from the public, so as not to antagonise the military. In 1947, he openly declared that his and his colleagues' activity for the ECP Inspectorate "is to be considered the same as working for the party". He was assisted at the ECP by Corneliu Mănescu, who, despite being considered a political suspect, had escaped the "verification" campaign and was helping Gheorghiu-Dej form an independent connection between the PCR and the Chinese Communist Party. Petrescu personally oversaw the content of libraries and magazines that soldiers could access; ahead of the legislative election in November 1946, he instructed his officers to make sure that soldiers had a "political attitude" that was favourable to the PCR.

Having secured his own printing press for Glasul Armatei, Petrescu handled the editorial process, which produced 60 thousand electoral brochures and 145 thousand propaganda posters. In October of the following year, he established the People's Army magazine, eponymously known as Armata. He introduced socialist competition between his subordinates, and successfully obtained state funding for his various ventures, including his creation of sports teams—in association football, volleyball, alpine skiing, bobsleigh, and various other sports. As Gîju writes, these initiatives, which resulted in the creation of an army's sports base—as CSA Steaua București—, were troubling, since they came at a time when Romania had been strapped by the Soviet Union with orders to pay reparation for the previous war. Petrescu became the CSA's first honorary president, and, in 1947, helped to secure a top-level spot for the ASA football club.

=== Political rise ===
Petrescu held on to his ECP position before and during the establishment of a Romanian People's Republic on the early days of 1948—a stage when the PCR went as the "Workers' Party" (PMR), to signal its absorption of the PSDR. He was also a junior member of the PMR Central Committee (23 February 1948 – 24 January 1950), serving as a sectional leader in 1948–1951. On 3 January 1948, he spoke at the Romanian Radio Broadcasting Company, announcing: "The Romanian people's army shall fight for the Republic's consolidation, for the happiness and welfare of all those who toil with their arms or their intellect, in the cities and villages alike." Petrescu ran in the legislative election of March 1948 on the People's Democratic Front (FDP) list, serving one full term in the Great National Assembly (MAN)—wherein he represented Gorj County. On 3 March 1949, he also joined the PMR Agrarian Commission, which was tasked with overseeing the collectivisation of agriculture. Its other members were Pauker, Nicolae Ceaușescu, Vasile Vaida, Pavel Chirtoacă, and Mircea Geoagiu. Shortly after, Chirtoacă reported complaints made privately by the more liberal communist Ion Gheorghe Maurer, who allegedly described collectivisation as a disaster which had caused peasants to "hate us all". Chirtoacă also quoted Maurer as saying that Petrescu, whom he dismissively labelled "The Platoon Leader", was not competent enough for the task.

On 5 July 1949, Petrescu was assigned Chairmanship of the MAN, a position he maintained to 28 December, when he was replaced by Alexandru Drăghici. Petrescu's military career saw his promotion to major general on 25 July 1948, when he was also assigned to work directly under the secretariat of the National Defense Ministry; before or after that date, for a few months, he was head of the Army's Political Directorate. On 15 December 1949, he passed into the army reserves. From 13 April 1948 to 9 March 1952, he was chairman for the State Committee of Industrial Supply. In June–July 1949, he returned to Moscow with a PMR delegation that also comprised Drăghici, Leonte Răutu, Simion Bughici, and Raia Vidrașcu; its mission was to study and copy the organizational methods of the Soviet Communist Party. On 24 January 1950, this exchange resulted in the formation of a Romanian Orgburo, with Petrescu as one of its 17 inaugural members. Though stripped of any real powers, it was mainly involved in creating the Romanian nomenklatura (a category of high-ranking communist bureaucrats, estimated by Petrescu himself as 17,900 to 20,000 people).

That same day, Petrescu was made a full member of the PMR Central Committee, maintaining his seat to 28 December 1955. He acknowledged the Agrarian Commission's disestablishment, and its replacement with a more centralised Agrarian Section of the Central Committee, under Pauker's direct watch. As Petrescu noted at the time, this tighter control was justified: "[T]he socialist transformation of agriculture does not happen by itself, for that task falls to the party and the proletariat. The initiative to move towards socialism does not belong to the peasants." On 26 January 1950, he was again proclaimed Chairman of the MAN, but only served to 29 May, when he was replaced by Doncea.

Official propaganda described Petrescu's assignments as "important and responsible party- and state-designated tasks." Câmpeanu assesses that, overall, Doncea and Petrescu were assigned "utterly mediocre" positions, and effectively sidelined, by Gheorghiu-Dej, who had been made General Secretary after having spent the war years in Romanian prisons. This push inaugurated "tense relations" between the "Muscovite" railwaymen and their national-communist rivals. As noted by Câmpeanu, Petrescu was assigned to take over at the Ministry of Finance so that he could "impose order" after the ouster of a disgraced "Muscovite", Vasile Luca. He was a titular minister from 9 March 1952, immediately after Luca had been ousted, officially for his delays in enforcing a monetary reform. In May 1952, Petrescu also assisted Gheorghiu-Dej in defeating and sidelining Pauker. During the proceedings of the party plenary which condemned Pauker, former DTV cadre Dumitru Coliu revealed that Petrescu had taken sides against the Pauker group as early as 1946—when he allegedly informed the PMR's organs that Neuländer-Roman and "other Jewish comrades" were conspiring to have Gheorghiu-Dej replaced by Pauker.

On 16 October 1952, the workers at Tudor Vladimirescu Textile Mill in Tîrgu Jiu nominated Petrescu as their FDP candidate in the upcoming legislative election; he took that seat, one of 37 for Craiova Region, on 30 November. In January 1953, Minister Petrescu reported to the MAN on the pace of reform, and claimed to have secured a budgetary surplus of 1 billion lei. The following month, he appeared a venue in Giulești, for the 20th anniversary of the Grivița events. On that occasion, "he spoke about the courage shown by railway workers under the direct leadership of the Communist Party of Romania and Comrade Gh[eorghe] Gheorghiu-Dej in these battles for a better life and against fascism." Historian Elisabeta Neagoe-Pleșa writes that, though never a top-ranking member of the railwaymen (and in fact "practically unknown" to them in 1933), Gheorghiu-Dej had become the "main beneficiary of the 'Grivița myth'." Petrescu's other focus was on football as a propaganda weapon; in 1953, he postulated that: "By losing international games, we also lose politically. It might be asserted that football, despite all the favourable conditions created for its development, does not rise to the height of the international prestige of our Republic."

=== Downfall and final return ===
Petrescu's ministerial mandate ended on 4 October 1955, when he began his stint as Deputy Prime Minister of Romania—lasting to 11 May 1956. This appointment overlapped with an investigation about his alleged opposition to the party line: in early 1955, a commission of the PMR Politburo reported "on the anti-party activity of some party members"—including Petrescu, Maurer, Constantin Agiu, Mihai Levente, Bucur Șchiopu, Victor Dușa, and the ECP's Ion Eremia. Gîju believes that Petrescu was a victim of intrigues by Neuländer-Roman, "the Jewish internationalist, [who was] much more traveled, more learned, and shrewder". His term was ultimately cut short by the peaceful purge, consecrated on 17 April 1956, when the entire Politburo asked him to step down and take up "grunt work" (munca de jos). His downfall continued in July 1956, when he was expelled from the PMR, alongside Agiu, Dușa, and Eremia. Petrescu was personally accused of having spoken out against democratic centralism during his conversations with other party figures; he tried to fight the accusations, asking that his case be handled by the entire Politburo, rather than by a selection of investigators. Eremia, who was ultimately sentenced to 25 years of hard labour, sought clemency by admitting his guilt, and informed the PMR that Maurer was equally guilty; as he noted, the only one of the group to have refrained from protecting Maurer was Petrescu.

As noted by Neagoe-Pleșa: "Any criticism of the general secretary was taken as proof of factionalism", with the Petrescu expulsion being a "general warning" in this respect. Bârlădeanu reports overhearing Petrescu's criticism of Gheorghiu-Dej, but argues that these were a pretext. In his view, it was Petrescu's styling as "Petrescu-Grivița" that incensed the general secretary, and ultimately caused Petrescu's downfall. A younger communist potentate, Paul Niculescu-Mizil reports that Petrescu, an "exceptional man", had been "removed from political life [...] in order for Dej to overemphasize his own role in the struggles of 1933". Șperlea similarly writes: "The reason for Dumitru Petrescu's marginalization was that, when Dej was busy consolidating his own cult of personality, [...] the biography of railwayman Dumitru Petrescu, with his leading role in the struggles of February 1933, was an obvious hindrance". One account provided by Tismăneanu and historian Cristian Vasile centers on Petrescu and Doncea's archival interview with Mihail Roller, which fully recorded their doubts about Gheorghiu-Dej's contribution to the 1933 strike. In June 1958, Doncea was similarly punished, leading Gheorghiu-Dej's loyalists to suggest that the general had been part of a "Doncea group" of factionalists. The attack on Doncea and his supposed followers was spearheaded by Ceaușescu, and by the former "Muscovite" Răutu, who alleged that Petrescu and the others had endorsed a Romanian version of Titoism.

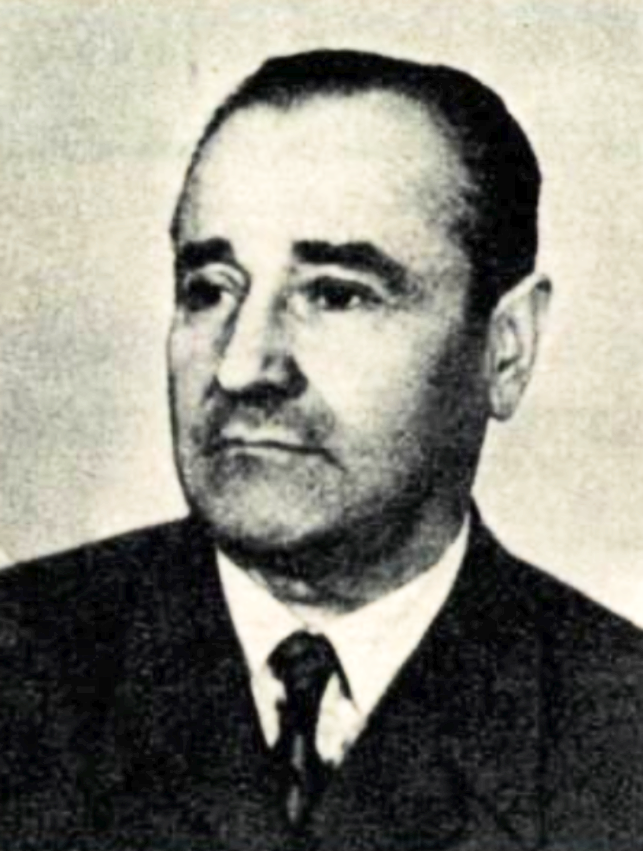
Petrescu's official photograph, circulated after his reinstatement on the PCR Central Committee

Petrescu was rehabilitated and reinstated in May 1965, months after Gheorghiu-Dej's death from cancer; the reassessment of his case was ordered by General Secretary Ceaușescu, now a partial revisionist. According to Niculescu-Mizil, his and Doncea's recovery was welcomed by the party base and by public opinion at large. On 24 July, Petrescu was again made a junior member of the Central Committee—the party itself having returned to its old name. Party historian Gh. Matei now referred to both Petrescu and Gheorghiu-Dej as "leaders of the revolutionary combat of January–February 1933", noting that they had turned the Grivița trial "into a tribune for unmasking the bourgeois-landowning regime". On 30 December 1965, Petrescu took over as chairman of the State Committee for Occupational Safety, representing Romania at the International Labour Organization conference in Geneva (June 1966). He then served as first secretary of the Labor Ministry, from 9 February 1968 to 13 March 1969. He was additionally head of the General Directorate of the National Stockpile, from 3 April 1968 to 15 March 1969. During that interval, he participated in the posthumous rehabilitation of Gheorghiu-Dej's victim Lucrețiu Pătrășcanu, reporting to PCR investigators on how Pauker had unwittingly antagonised the two.

In December 1968, Petrescu became vice-president of the PCR-led Front of Socialist Unity (FUS), elected to a similar (and largely ceremonial) position on the State Council in 1969. With the March 1969 election, Petrescu returned to the MAN for his third and last term—his constituency was the Bucharest neighbourhood of Libertății Park. For a few days, to 13 March 1969, he was secretary of the legislature's Economic Committee. In June, he led a FUS delegation to Socialist Czechoslovakia, where he studied the equivalent National Front and met its chairman, Jan Pauly. His final assignment was granted during the PCR Tenth Congress on 12 August 1969, when he took a highly influential position: he was inducted by the Permanent Presidium of the Politburo. This was the only body of power wherein Ceaușescu still tolerated old communists, namely those who had been active with the PCR during its underground phase; even here, there were only four: Petrescu, Maurer, Emil Bodnăraș, and Gogu Rădulescu. By the time of his death, Petrescu was a recipient of the Order of Michael the Brave, 3rd class (1947) and the Order of Labor, 2nd class (1949), having also been granted the Czechoslovak War Cross, as well as the Soviet Red Star and "For the Victory" Medals. He and his wife had raised six children, of whom four were girls.

Petrescu died a month and a day after his promotion, at a hospital in the Czech city of Karlovy Vary. His vacation there had been interrupted by upper gastrointestinal bleeding and hepatorenal syndrome; the ultimate cause of death was cirrhosis. On 14 September, the body was retrieved from Prague by Virgil Trofin and Florian Dănălache, and accompanied to Ruzyně International Airport by Evžen Erban and other Czechoslovak Communist Party dignitaries. A day of national mourning was declared for Petrescu's funeral ceremony on 15 September. It was attended by both Ceaușescu and Răutu, alongside various representatives of the institutions he had led, including the FUS; army officers were called in as the honour guard and pallbearers. The body was laid in state at the Great National Assembly Palace, in a coffin covered by the national tricolor, then deposed in the Libertății Park mausoleum, alongside the remains of other PCR dignitaries.

== Legacy ==
In January 1970, the regime honoured Petrescu's memory by assigning his name to Bucharest schools (School No 175 and Lyceum No 40), as well as to streets in Bucharest, Oradea, and Sfîntu Gheorghe; the latter landmark, traditionally known as Tankó Street, had also bore the name of "Vasile Luca", and, after Luca's downfall, was known as "Progress Street". In May 1971, a bust of Petrescu, done by Doru Popovici, was erected at Chibrit Square in Grivița. During the 40th anniversary of the Grivița action in February 1973, Ceaușescu spoke of his "high regard" for the communist participants, including "some who are no longer alive—Gheorghiu-Dej, Dumitru Petrescu, as well as others."

Such honouring was largely reversed after the Romanian Revolution of 1989: at some point before 1999, the mausoleum was repurposed, and Petrescu's ashes, alongside those of virtually all his colleagues, were handed to their respective families. In December 1990, the new authorities in Covasna County decreed that Sfîntu Gheorghe's Dumitru Petrescu Street was to be renamed, alongside streets named for Karl Marx and Vladimir Lenin. Its name was changed to "Vasile Goldiș Street", honouring a "prominent Romanian democrat". The issue created some controversy, since, although Goldiș was less offensive than Petrescu, both names were perceived as imposing Romanianization of a largely Székely-inhabited city. By 1999, it had been renamed after a Székely painter and heraldist, Ferenc Gödri. Oradea's Petrescu Street was renamed, after local politician Aurel Lazăr, in 1990. As argued in 2012 by Gîju, Petrescu's positive legacy at the CSA was overturned after the Revolution, when the sports base had "pretty much ran to waste".
