= Craiova Prison =

Penitentiary in Craiova, Romania

Coordinates: 44.3217°N 23.8123°E

Craiova Prison is a prison located in Craiova, Romania.

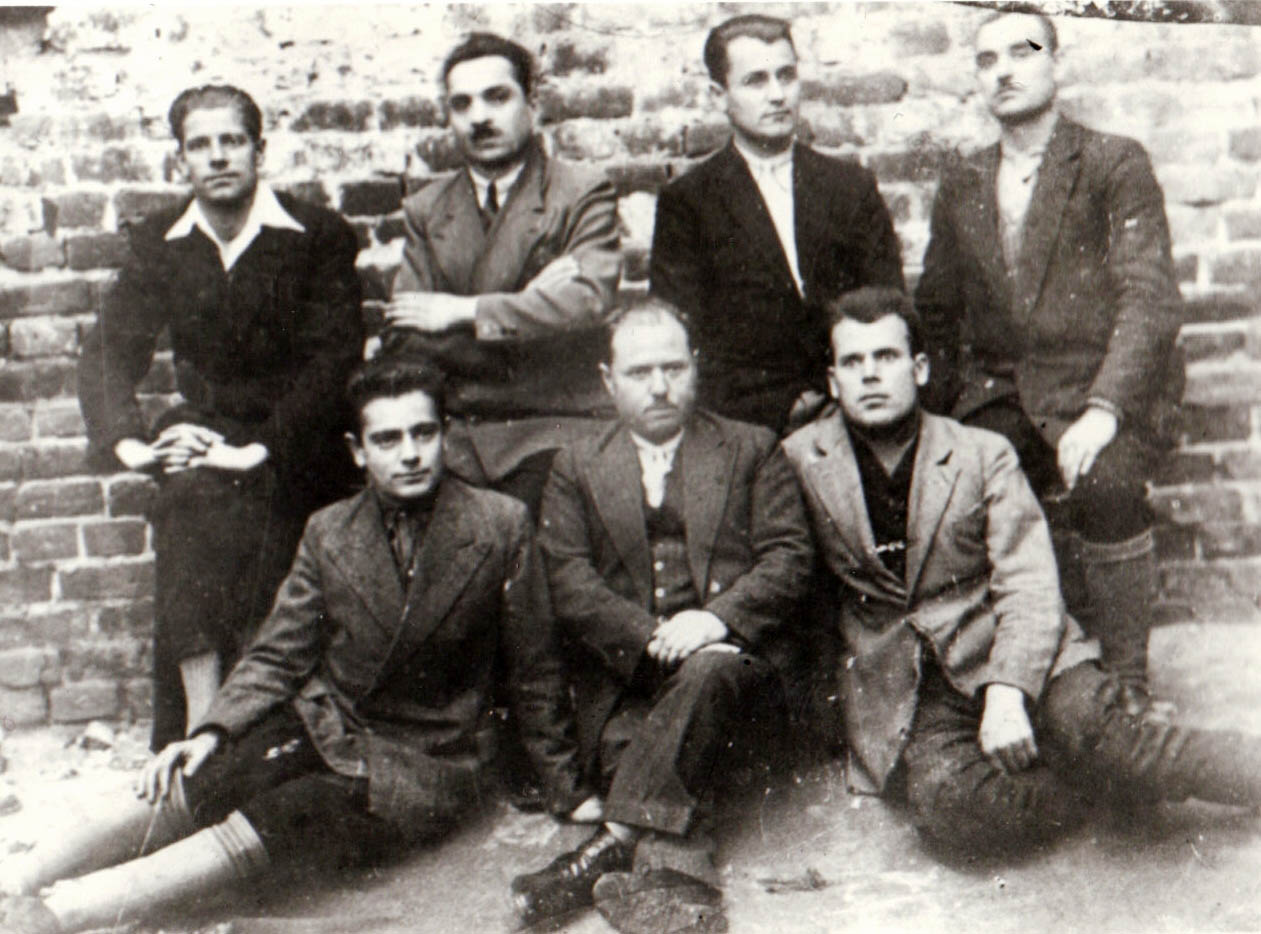
Defendants of the Grivița strike of 1933 trials in the Craiova Prison yard. Top row, from the left: Gheorghe Vasilichi, Dumitru Petrescu, Constantin Doncea, Gheorghe Gheorghiu-Dej. Bottom row, right: Chivu Stoica

The prison was originally located outside the city, but was later included within its boundaries. When it was built of stone and brick in 1894–1897, it was a modern, horseshoe-shaped structure on three levels. Each of these had 30 cells; initially, the number of inmates did not exceed 300, but the total swelled to over 850 following the 1907 peasants’ revolt. Until 1944, it housed both common criminal and political prisoners, especially members of the banned Romanian Communist Party. These included Gheorghe Vasilichi, Constantin Doncea, and Dumitru Popescu, who managed to escape.

Following the establishment of a communist regime in 1947, the number of political prisoners grew constantly; at first, these were mainly National Peasants' Party affiliates. While conditions were relatively mild during the first wave of arrests in 1945–1947, when the communists had not yet fully consolidated power, they worsened sharply in the following years. Underfeeding led to endemic hunger and advanced anemia; this was exacerbated by those who cooked and served the food, common criminals who would take part of the political prisoners’ portions for themselves. Punishment for political detainees was harsher, and included an isolation cell. They were interrogated by teams of Securitate secret police agents inside the prison, as the basements in their building had become overcrowded with detainees. Some died following beatings by Securitate and Militia personnel, their general state of health already weakened by conditions behind bars.

In the early 1950s, many peasants from the surrounding Oltenia region were sent to Craiova. They were accused of sabotaging collectivization or of abetting the anti-communist resistance movement. The prison served as a transit center before they were sent on to the Danube–Black Sea Canal or other labor camps. A relaxation followed the death of Joseph Stalin in 1953; this was reversed amidst the wave of arrests that occurred when the Hungarian Revolution of 1956 was crushed, so that the number of detainees grew from a capacity of 1,100 to some 1,800. Notable inmates include Aurelian Bentoiu, Nicolae Penescu, Mihail Romniceanu, Radu Câmpeanu, Corneliu Coposu, Ioan Mocsony-Stârcea, Ioan Carlaonț, Ioan Hudiță, and Richard Wurmbrand, most of whom were transferred to other prisons in due time.

Detainees during the 2000s included Konstantinos Passaris, Omar Hayssam, and Miron Cozma.
