= Chivu Stoica =

48th Prime Minister of Romania (1908–1975)

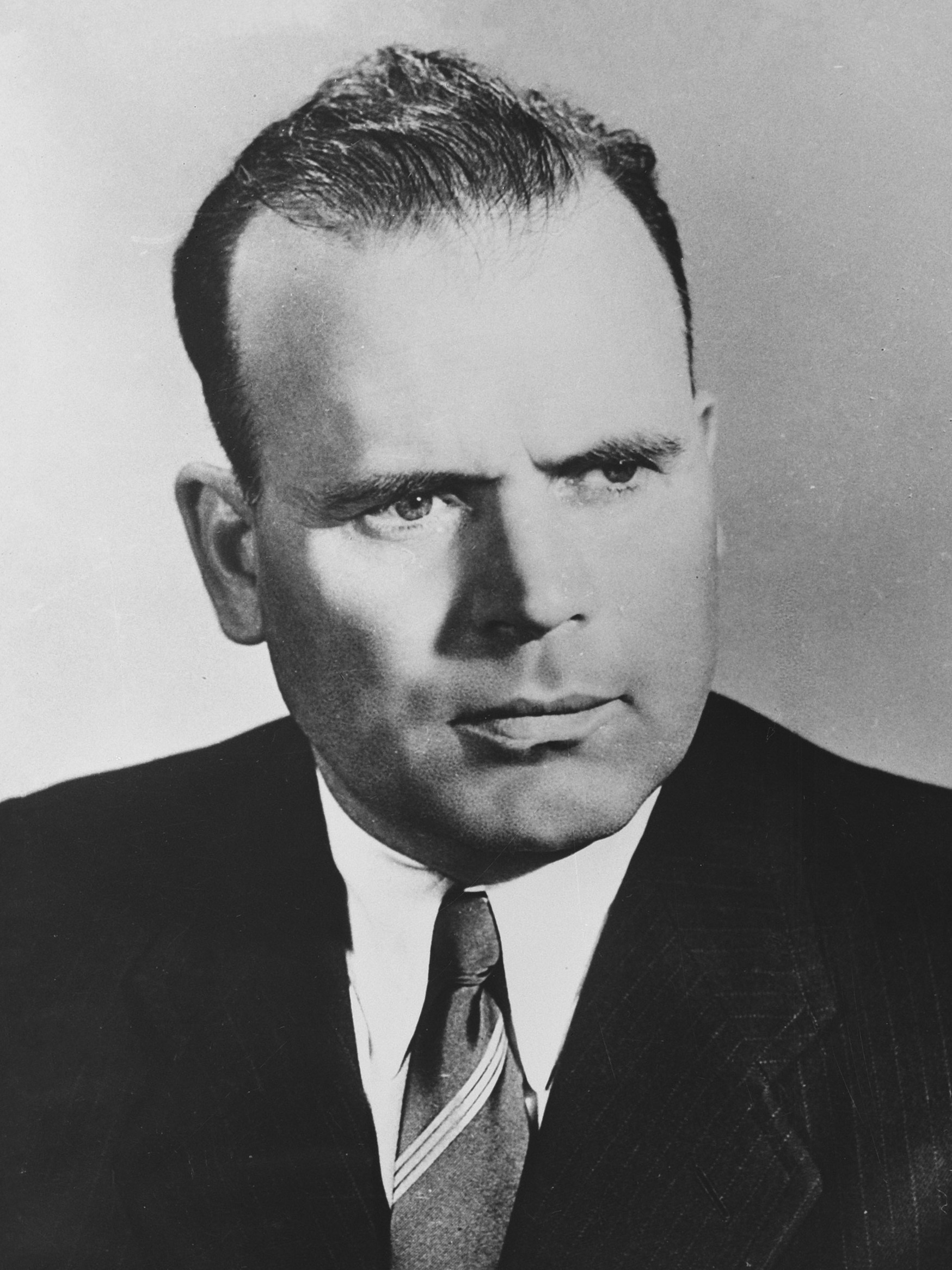
- Stoica in 1957

President of the State Council
- In office 24 March 1965 – 9 December 1967
- Prime Minister: Ion Gheorghe Maurer
- Preceded by: Gheorghe Gheorghiu-Dej
- Succeeded by: Nicolae Ceaușescu

48th Prime Minister of Romania
- In office 21 October 1955 – 21 March 1961
- President: Petru Groza; Ion Gheorghe Maurer
- Deputy: Emil Bodnăraș
- Preceded by: Gheorghe Gheorghiu-Dej
- Succeeded by: Ion Gheorghe Maurer

First Vice President of the Council of Ministers
- In office 20 August 1954 – 4 October 1955
- Prime Minister: Gheorghe Gheorghiu-Dej
- Succeeded by: Emil Bodnăraș

Minister of Industry^{[a]}
- In office 15 April 1948 – 31 May 1952
- Prime Minister: Petru Groza
- Succeeded by: Carol Loncear

Personal details
- Born: 8 August [O.S. 26 July] 1908 Smeeni, Buzău County, Kingdom of Romania
- Died: 18 February 1975 (aged 66) Bucharest, Socialist Republic of Romania
- Cause of death: Suicide by firearm
- Party: Romanian Communist Party
- Spouses: Ecaterina Micu-Chivu (divorced): Maria Manolescu-Chivu
- Children: 2
- Occupation: Boilermaker
- Awards: Order of the Crown of Romania, Grand Officer rank; Order of the Star of the Romanian People's Republic, 1st class; Order of Labor, 1st class; August 23 Order, 1st class; Tudor Vladimirescu Order, 1st class; Hero of the Socialist Republic of Romania
- a. Minister of Metallurgy and Chemical Industries from 23 November 1949

Chivu Stoica (the family name being Chivu; 8 August [O.S. 26 July] 1908 – 18 February 1975) was a leading Romanian Communist politician, who served as President of the Council of Ministers (Prime Minister) of the Socialist Republic of Romania.

== Early life ==
Stoica was born in Smeeni, Buzău County, the sixth child of a ploughman. At age 12, after 5 years of elementary school, he left home, and started working as an apprentice at Căile Ferate Române, the state railway corporation. In 1921, he moved to Bucharest, where he worked as a boilermaker at the Vulcan, Lemaître, and Malaxa companies. He joined the National Peasants' Party (PNȚ), serving as secretary for the Blue Sector of Bucharest until 1929. At the Malaxa works, he met Gheorghe Vasilichi, who recruited him into the Communist Party (PCR) in 1931.

== Career ==
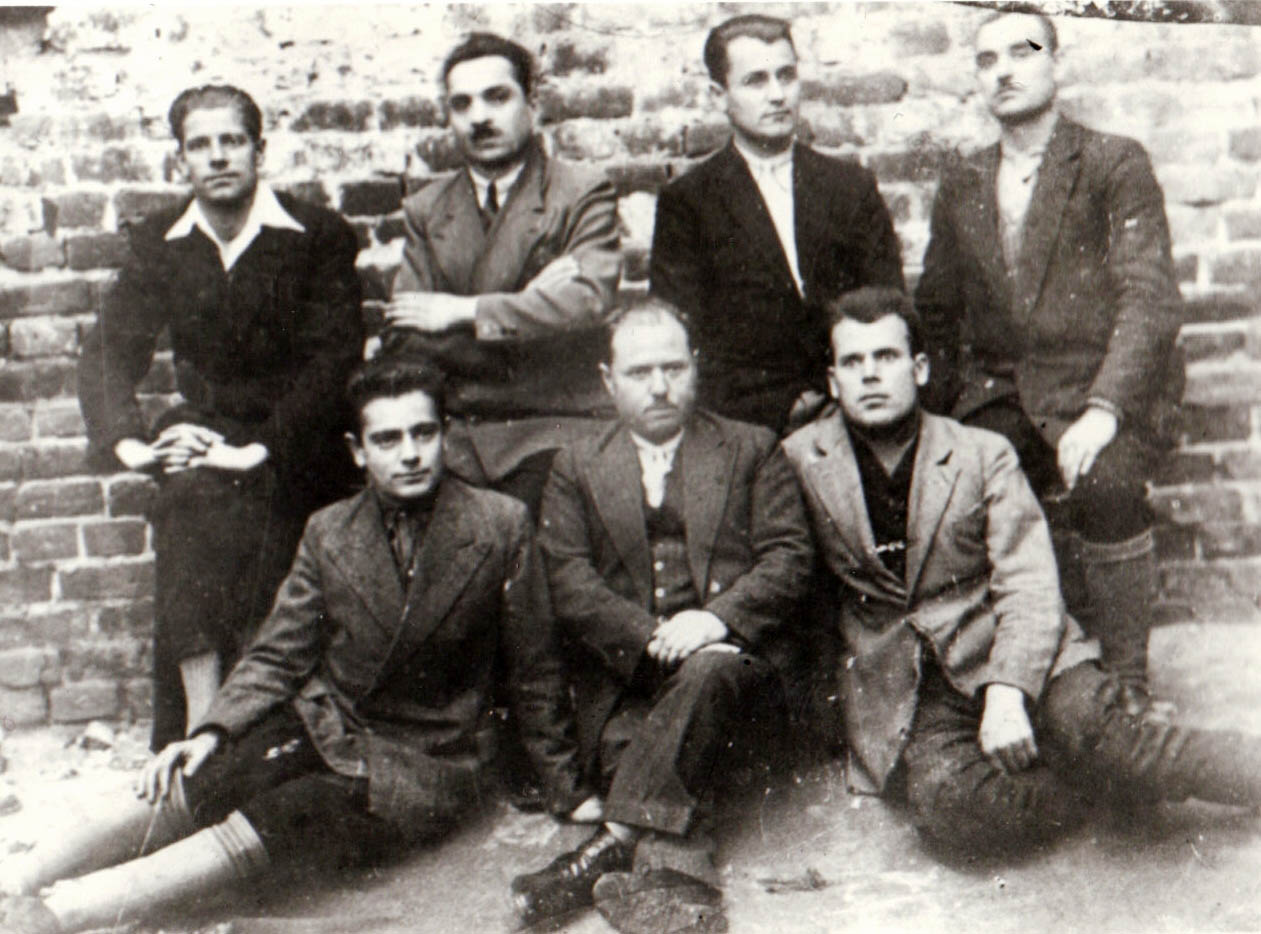
Defendants of the Grivița strike of 1933 trials in the Craiova Prison yard. Top row, from the left: Gheorghe Vasilichi, Dumitru Petrescu, Constantin Doncea, Gheorghe Gheorghiu-Dej. Stoica is on the bottom row, to the right

In spring 1931, Stoica started working for the Grivița Railway Yards, where he met Gheorghe Gheorghiu-Dej, Vasile Luca, and Constantin Doncea; together, they started organizing a strike. On 20 August 1934, he was sentenced to 15 years of prison for his role in the Grivița Strike of 1933. He spent time at the Aiud, Doftana, Târgu Ocna, Văcărești, and Caransebeș prisons. In 1935–1936 he was at Ocnele Mari Prison, together with Gheorghiu-Dej. In 1940, his sentence was reduced to 9 years of hard labor. Later, the War Council of the 1st Army Corps pardoned him, but he was interned in the Târgu Jiu camp. At the internment camp, he was close to Gheorghiu-Dej, who may have wanted Stoica to be his successor as General Secretary.

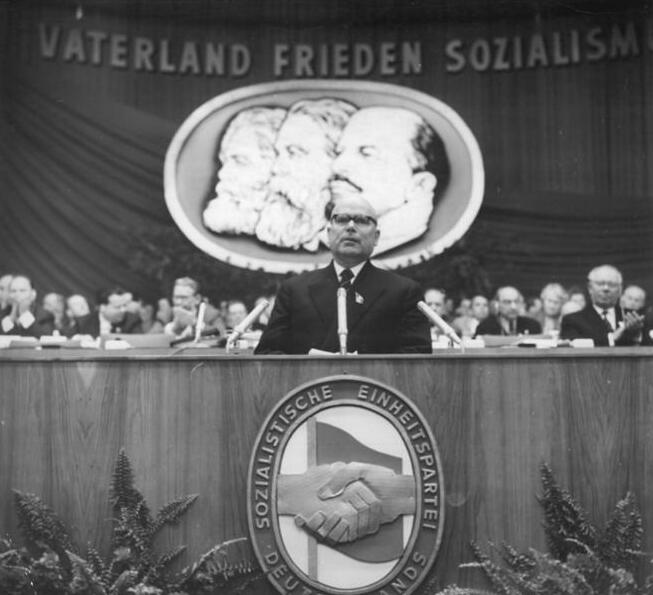
Stoica giving a speech in Berlin, 18 January 1963

He was a member of the Central Committee of the Romanian Workers' Party from 1945 to 1975, and a member of the Politburo. He was Prime Minister of Romania between 1955 and 1961 and President of the State Council of Romania (de facto head of state) from 1965 until 1967.

Stoica was awarded the Order of the Crown of Romania in the rank of Grand Officer (1947), the Order of the Star of the Romanian People's Republic, 1st class (1948, 1958), the Order of Labor, 1st class (1959), the title of Hero of Socialist Labour and the Hammer and Sickle Gold Medal (1958), the August 23 Order, 1st class (1959), the Tudor Vladimirescu Order, 1st class (1966), and the title of Hero of the Socialist Republic of Romania (1973).

== Death ==
He died aged 66 at his residence in the exclusive Primăverii neighborhood of Bucharest. His death, by a Holland & Holland hunting rifle bullet to the head, was ruled a suicide.

== Family ==
Stoica had three wives. With the first one he had a daughter, Cornelia. His second wife was Ecaterina Micu-Chivu (née Klein), a communist activist who worked after 1947 for the Ministry of Foreign Affairs, the Romanian–Soviet Institute, and the Red Cross, and was a professor at Politehnica University until 1955. The couple had a daughter, Ana; they also adopted a son, but later revoked the adoption. His third wife was Maria Chivu (née Manolescu), an engineer and a party and union activist.

Party political offices
Preceded by Gheorghe Gheorghiu-Dej	President of the State Council; 24 March 1965–9 December 1967	Succeeded by Nicolae Ceaușescu
Preceded by Gheorghe Gheorghiu-Dej	Prime Minister of Romania; 21 October 1955– 21 March 1961	Succeeded by Ion Gheorghe Maurer
