= Eforie =

- Town
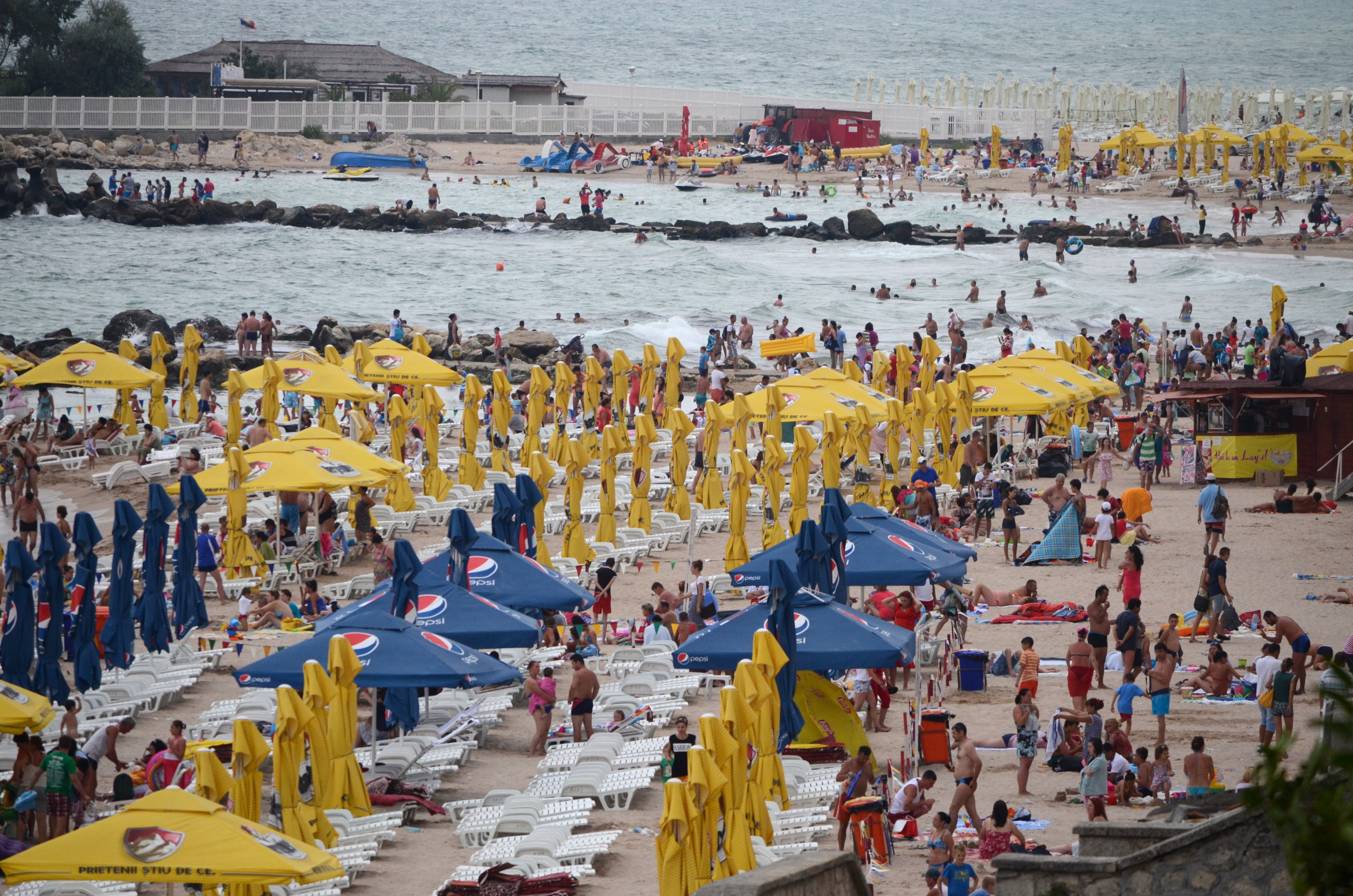

- Coat of arms

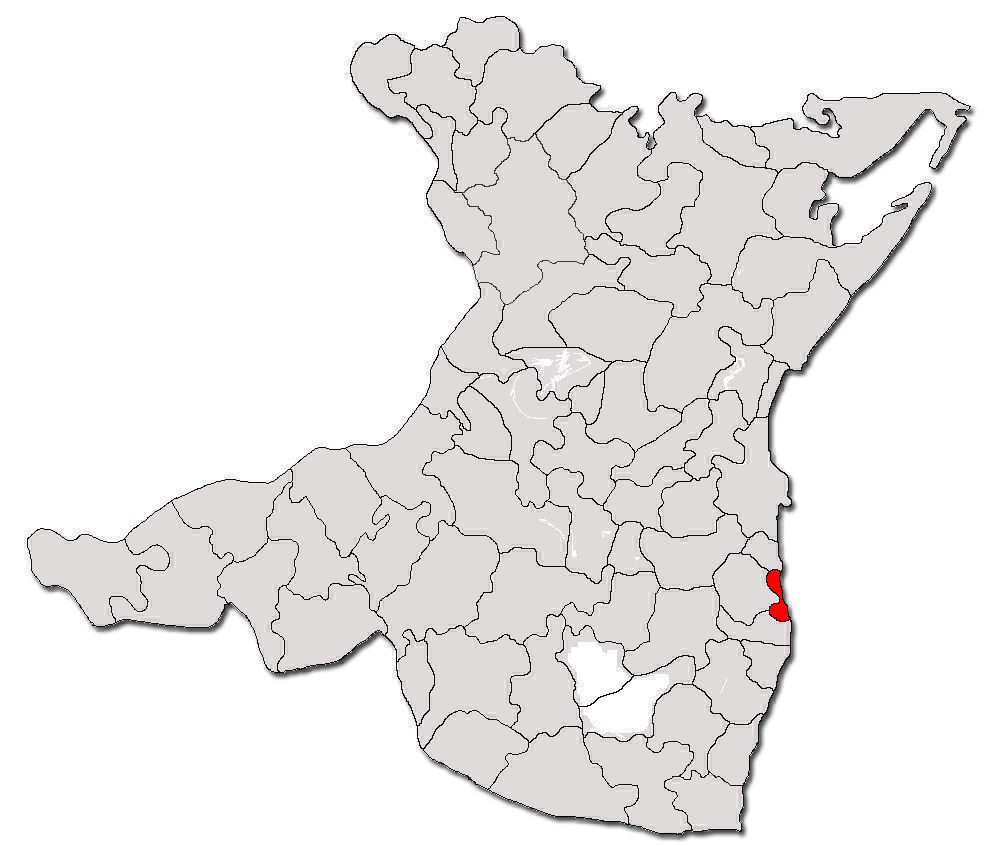
- Location in Constanța County

- Location in Romania
- Coordinates: 44°4′N 28°38′E
- Country: Romania
- County: Constanța

Government
  - Mayor (2024–2028): Robert Șerban (PNL)
- Area: 7.38 km^{2} (2.85 sq mi)
- Elevation: 5 m (16 ft)
- Population (2021-12-01): 8,630
  - Density: 1,170/km^{2} (3,030/sq mi)
- Time zone: UTC+02:00 (EET)
  - Summer (DST): UTC+03:00 (EEST)
- Postal code: 905360
- Area code: (+40) 02 41
- Vehicle reg.: CT
- Website: www.primariaeforie.ro

Eforie (Romanian pronunciation: [efoˈri.e]; historical names (for Eforie Sud): Băile Movilă, Carmen-Sylva, Vasile Roaită) is a town and a holiday resort on the Black Sea shore, in Constanța County, Northern Dobruja, Romania. It is located about 14 km (8.7 mi) south of Constanța. Techirghiol Lake lies nearby.

== History ==
Historical population
Year	Pop.	±%
1930	872	—
1948	1,503	+72.4%
1956	3,286	+118.6%
1966	6,617	+101.4%
1977	9,507	+43.7%
1992	9,316	−2.0%
2002	9,294	−0.2%
2011	8,621	−7.2%
2021	8,630	+0.1%
Source: Census data

Eforie Sud, the southern part of the town, was founded by the aristocrat Ion Movilă in 1899, when he erected a hotel named Băile Movilă (Movilă Spa). In 1928, the spa was renamed Carmen-Sylva, after the pen name of Queen Elisabeth of Romania. In 1950, after the establishment of the Communist regime, the name of the city was changed again to Vasile Roaită to honor a railway worker shot dead during the Grivița strike of 1933. In 1962, the city was renamed yet again to Eforie Sud.

In 1966, the city of Eforie was created by merging Eforie Sud with the northern resort Eforie Nord. Formally, the city is composed of Eforie Sud, the administrative centre, and Eforie Nord, a dependent village. Many other hotels were built here over the years, most of them during the communist regime.

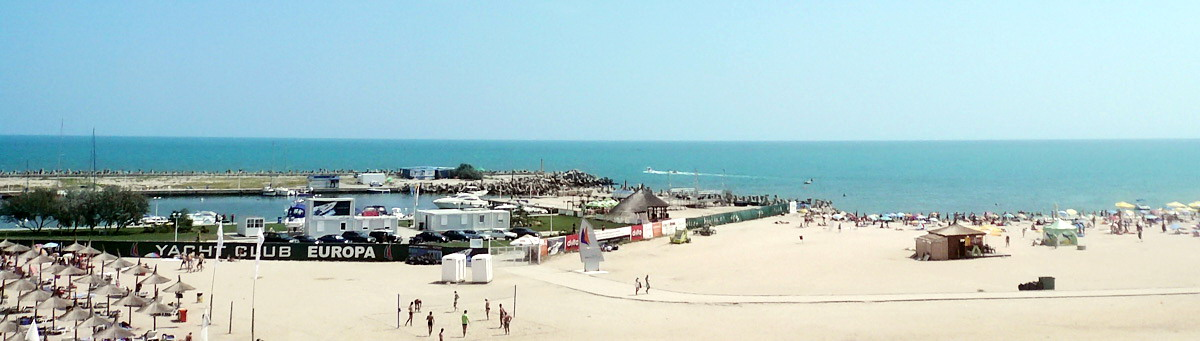
Beach view

== Education ==
"Carmen Sylva" High School is the city's only high school (located in Eforie Sud, which also has a general school, while another general school is located in Eforie Nord).

== Sports ==
Besides many summer sports, as beach football, there is a football club named CS Eforie, playing in Liga III.

== Natives ==
- Andreea Bănică (born 1978), singer and songwriter
