= Petre Gheorghe =

Petre Ion Gheorghe
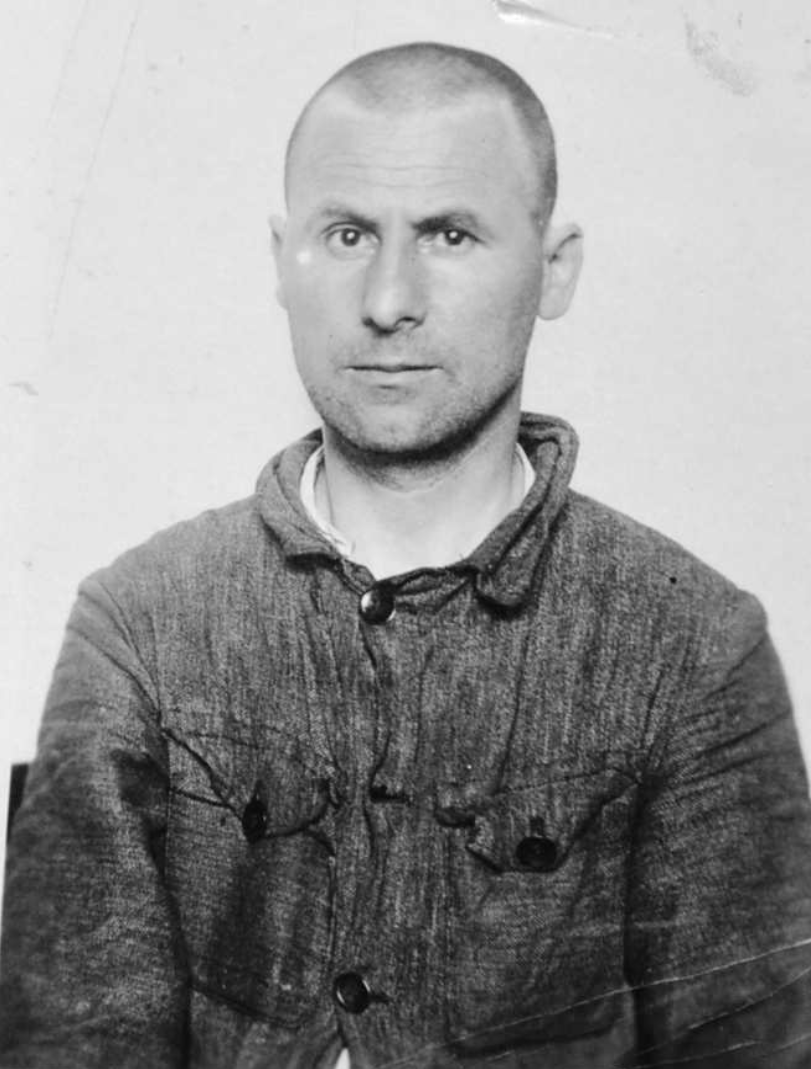
- Born: March 19, 1907; Dobrich, Southern Dobruja, Bulgaria
- Died: February 8, 1943 (aged 35); Romania
- Other names: Petre Ivan Gheorghieff; Petre Gheorghiev

Petre Ion Gheorghe (also known as Petre Ivan Gheorghieff or Gheorghiev; March 19, 1907 – February 8, 1943) was a Bulgarian-born Romanian communist and anti-fascist resistance member, executed by Romania for espionage and treason. Having risen through the ranks of the Union of Communist Youth, he was the leader of the strongest communist resistance group during the first part of World War II in Romania.

Of lowly origins, the largely self-educated Gheorghe spent the 1930s as a political agitator and organizer of social protest movements, for which he served several terms in prison. After 1940, with most of the Romanian Communist Party leadership either jailed or exiled, Gheorghe emerged as a prominent figure in the Bucharest party cell. He took part in the political infighting that split the party, and also involved himself in the anti-fascist resistance before being arrested, tried, and executed.

Following the end of World War II, with the emergence and consolidation of a communist regime, the dominant "prison faction" cited Gheorghe's case as evidence of betrayal by the Bucharest party cell. The deposed General Secretary, Ștefan Foriș, was kidnapped and investigated for his alleged role in this affair.

== Biography ==
=== Early life and political beginnings ===
Petre Ion Gheorghe was born in Dobrich, Southern Dobruja, to a poor family of Bulgarian peasants who practiced Bulgarian Orthodoxy. His father, Ivan Georgiev (later: Gheorghiev), was a blacksmith and his mother, Ivanova Kaluda, was a homemaker. Petre had two other brothers, Sebe Ivanof and Ion, as well as a sister, Ivanka.

Following the 1913 Second Balkan War, Dobrich became part of Romania and renamed to Bazargic. After graduating four primary classes in a private Bulgarian school in his hometown, at the age of 10, Petre started to work as a newspaper hawker. His parents enrolled him in the local high school, however, lacking financial means, Petre had to renounce his studies. He was hired as a carpenter apprentice, but gave up following the death of his father, and began work at a local construction company.

Gheorghe learned about communism by reading, as a teenager, the classics of Marxism. In 1925, at the age of 18, he contacted the youth movement of the then-illegal Communist Party (PCdR), and organized several Marxist circles for "the education of youth". In 1927, he also joined the Dobrujan Revolutionary Organization (DRO), a Bulgarian insurgent group, and two years later he became a member of its Caliacra County committee. A year later, he was enrolled into the Union of Communist Youth.

Conscripted in 1929, Gheorghe served his military stage at the Railroads Regiment in Iași, where he continued his propaganda work, which resulted in his being ordered to the disciplinary barracks on numerous occasions. After his return to Bazargic in 1930, he carried on with his political activity, a member of county committee of the Union of Communist Youth and an editor of the local Dobrujan newspaper Tânărul Bolşevic ("Young Bolshevik").

=== Communist Youth militant ===
On August 1, 1931, prompted by the world economic crisis, Communist Youth activists staged protests across the country. Gheorghe was one of the protest leaders in Bazargic, and found himself detained by police. After four days in custody, he appeared before the Caliacra Tribunal, and was cleared of all charges. Later that year, Gheorghe crossed into the Soviet Union as a delegate to the 5th Congress of the PCdR in Moscow. There, he spoke about Dobruja's oppressed peasantry, also informing the party about the fraud and political repression during the previous elections.

In April 1932, the PCdR cell in Bucharest provided the Dobruja chapter subversive brochures and illegal newspapers, including Scânteia and Tânărul Leninist ("The Young Leninist"), storing them in three suitcases. The whole operation was being followed by Siguranța, the secret police, which proceeded to arrest Petre Gheorghe and his colleague, a Bogdan Vasilef Pavloff. Gheorghe refused to collaborate with the authorities. He was convicted to 15 days in jail for spreading communist propaganda.

After he was released from the penitentiary in Constanța, Gheorghe moved back to Iași, tasked with putting out an illegal printing press and the newspaper Tânărul Muncitor ("Young Worker"). During the Grivița Strike of 1933, Gheorghe coordinated solidarity protests in both Bacău and Buhuși, collecting money and aid for the striking workers. He was again arrested on the night of October 4/5, 1933 in Chișinău, Bessarabia, charged with having spread communist agitprop. He was court-martialed and convicted to 3 months in prison, 5 years loss of civil rights, and a 500-lei fine (later commuted to a 10-day prison sentence). He was freed on April 24, 1935, after having served his time in Caliacra Penitentiary.

He then settled in Bucharest, where he was named Secretary of the Central Committee of the Union of Communist Youth. For the next two years, Gheorghe was able to evade Siguranța and create anti-fascist committees in Grivița's CFR Workshops, as well as in Voina şi Lemaître factories. As the Romanian delegate to the Young Communist International Congress in 1936, he was arrested in the Czechoslovak city of Košice, and expelled from that country following several weeks in prison. Shortly after returning to Romania, the PCdR opted to disband the Communist Youth, with scores of its members having been exposed and arrested. Gheorghe wrote a letter to the leadership of the party, whereby he voiced his displeasure.

Returning to Bazargic, he attempted to mobilize the workers to start striking actions. He was again conscripted and spent the year 1939 in a military unit in Galați, but returned in 1940 to lead the PCdR regional committee in Dobruja.

=== Trial and execution ===
After the cession of Bessarabia to the Soviets, Romania's secret services embarked on a full-scale repression of communists activists and sympathizers. Many of them were arrested and sent to prison camps such as the one in Miercurea Ciuc. This consolidated a "prison faction" of the party, under Gheorghe Gheorghiu-Dej, but cut the party loose from its contacts with Comintern sponsors. Still working underground as a secretary of the Bucharest party bureau, Gheorghe sided with Gheorghiu-Dej and Emil Bodnăraș, maneuvering against the General Secretary, Ștefan Foriș. The two sides of this internecine conflict accused each other of being spies for the Siguranța.

Gheorghe was himself arrested by 1942, after Romania entered World War II as a Nazi ally. As with many other military trials of the period, his took one day, that of August 6, 1942. The trial, reportedly masterminded by the Gestapo, was held at the court-martial of Ploiești, presided upon by Lieutenant-Colonel Cristea Manea. According to a 1957 biography, the trial took only 5 minutes and the accused were denied legal counsel.

Petre Gheorghe and Nicolae Atanasoff were found guilty of "crime against the state's security", being sentenced to capital punishment—as had been requested by the military prosecutor, Major P. Pârvănescu. The accused were then held at the Ploiești Penitentiary. Their appeals for clemency were denied, as was a request for pardon that they sent to King Michael I.

Gheorghe was scheduled to be executed on February 8, 1943. As the minutes of his execution show, he yelled "Down with war", "Long live Free Romania" and obscene words addressed to the Germans. He was then blindfolded and shot by an execution squad. According to an eyewitness, Gheorghe and Atanasoff were laid in coffins prepared beforehand, and buried under headstones which carried the text: "Executed as communists fighting against our fatherland in the interest of Bolshevism".

By summer 1944, with Romania losing the war on the Eastern Front, Gheorghiu-Dej reemerged from prison to assist in the anti-fascist coup. He also staged a party coup, kidnapping Foriș and other members of the 1940 Secretariat. At the party trial that followed this event, Foriș and Remus Koffler were charged with having betrayed Gheorghe.

Gheorghe's remains were moved in 1967 in the mausoleum in Carol Park, together with the remains of other "revolutionary fighters". The necropolis was disbanded in 1991, some months after the Romanian anti-communist revolution. The whereabouts of his remains is unknown.
