= Red Caps (London) =

The Red Caps are a team of street wardens operating in the West End of London, U.K. They patrol Regent Street and Oxford Street and are 11 in number. The Red Caps were launched on 30 July 2002. They are employed through the New West End Company, which looks after the interests of retail outlets in the ORB (Oxford St, Regent St, Bond St) area.

The Red Caps were introduced to combat street crime in partnership with the Westminster Police, though they are a private company. Their duties range from security, reporting environmental issues to the council, to providing help to tourists and shoppers in the West End. In their early inception, in the days before PCSOs (police community support officers), the Red Caps were much more heavily involved in reducing crime, but now deterring crime goes hand in hand with customer service and enhancing the shopping experience for Regent Street and Oxford street.

Red Caps were so named for the colour of their headwear, though in May 2009 a new uniform was introduced which saw Regent Street Red Caps in a magenta shade and Oxford Street in the traditional red.
