= Constantin Doncea =

Romanian communist activist and politician

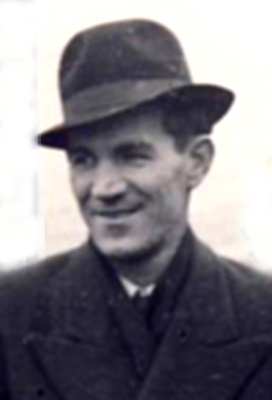
- Born: 26 September 1904; Cocu, Old Kingdom
- Died: 4 November 1973 (aged 69); Bucharest, Socialist Republic of Romania
- Education: Moscow State Pedagogical Institute
- Occupation: Lathe operator
- Era: 20th century
- Known for: Leading Grivița strike
- Political party: PCR
- Criminal penalty: Imprisoned in Jilava
- Criminal status: Escaped
- Awards: Order of Tudor Vladimirescu; Hero of Socialist Labour; Order of the Star of Romania; Order of the Star of the Romanian People's Republic
- Military career
- Allegiance: Third International
- Service: International Brigades; NKVD
- Service years: 1938–1945
- Rank: Major general of the Army of the Romanian People's Republic
- Unit: Dimitrov Battalion
- Battles: Battle of the Ebro; Catalonia Offensive; Eastern Front

Constantin Doncea (26 September 1904 – 4 November 1973) was a Romanian communist activist and politician. A railway worker, he played an important part in the Grivița Strike of 1933. Subsequently, imprisoned, he escaped and ended up in Moscow. He then joined the International Brigades during the Spanish Civil War. After spending much of World War II in the Soviet Union, he returned to Romania, where he helped establish a Communist regime. Doncea held a series of posts under the new order, but in 1958 he was removed from the party after clashing with its leader Gheorghe Gheorghiu-Dej. In his later years, he was rehabilitated by the latter's successor, Nicolae Ceaușescu.

== Biography ==
=== Beginnings, strike action and Spain ===
Doncea was born in Cocu, Argeș County and was a lathe operator by profession. He practiced this work at the Pitești Căile Ferate Române (CFR) state railway deposit and at the Grivița CFR yards in Bucharest. He joined the banned Romanian Communist Party (PCR) in 1931, was a member of the party cell at Grivița and head of the Bucharest rail workers' trade union committee. He belonged to the strike committee during the Grivița Strike of 1933, and in this capacity drew attention for the energy with which he led and instigated the workers. They, his judges and the press all perceived him as the strike leader, while the Comintern created a "Doncea myth" that made him into the most recognizable figure of the Romanian proletariat. Arrested and imprisoned at Jilava and Craiova, he was initially sentenced to hard labor for life by the authorities of the Kingdom of Romania, albeit this was later commuted to twenty years' hard labor.

On January 3, 1935, together with fellow Grivița strikers Dumitru Petrescu and Gheorghe Vasilichi, he made a daring escape from prison that created a press sensation. After spending time in various safe houses, the trio managed to leave Romania through Halmeu, passing into Czechoslovakia before ending up in Moscow. There, they enrolled in classes at the Moscow State V. I. Lenin Pedagogical Institute, but the Romanian-language section was disbanded before they could graduate. Soviet intelligence subjected them to lengthy interrogations, suspecting a possible infiltration by the Siguranța secret police.

In 1938, he went to France, where he soon enrolled as a volunteer in the International Brigades during the Spanish Civil War, functioning both as a soldier and as a political secretary at the company, battalion and brigade level at the Battle of the Ebro and during the Catalonia Offensive. After fleeing Spain in February 1939 as the war neared its conclusion, he was interned in a camp at Saint-Cyprien in the south of France, where he was secretary of the Romanian volunteers' party organization and of the Dimitrov Battalion. Several months later, he left for the Soviet Union, where he remained during World War II until after the Coup of August 1944, when the Soviets parachuted him into Romania.

=== In office and downfall ===
Upon the August 1944 legalization of the PCR (PMR from 1948, shortly after the establishment of a communist regime), he held a number of posts over the next two decades. He was infantry lieutenant colonel in the Romanian Land Forces (from August 1945); member of the Bucharest regional party committee; secretary of the Ilfov County party committee; adviser to the monetary stabilization committee (August–November 1947). As deputy Mayor of Bucharest (November 1947 – February 1948), he supervised the demolition of Bucharest statues anathema to the regime, including those of Pache Protopopescu, Carol I, Ferdinand, Marie and Ion C. Brătianu. He became an alternate member of the PMR's central committee (February 1948 – June 1958), with the following assignments: deputy Constructions Minister (February 1948 – March 1950); major-general of the people's army (1950); head of the air-defense command (March 1950 – May 1952); control committee of the central committee following his retirement from active military service (May 1952); Harvest Minister (March 1956 – February 1957) and president of the state committee for pricing agricultural products (February 1957 – June 1958).

Doncea's downfall occurred at a June 1958 central committee plenary session. That year marked the 25th anniversary of the Grivița strike, and his problems stemmed from a speech he delivered before the Mihai Roller-led party history institute, during sessions the latter organized there in 1955–1956. There, he appeared to minimize the PCR's role during the strike, although he later tried to correct the slip. At the eventual party session, a list of accusations against him was read by Nicolae Ceaușescu, the main charges being that he had not given enough credit to the party and had undervalued the contribution of Gheorghe Gheorghiu-Dej, by then party leader. At the same time, he was criticized for excessive self-promotion, one of his sharpest accusers being his former jail mate Vasilichi, who was seeking to save his own position. Following the session, Doncea was removed from the central committee and from the party itself. This formed part of a broader purge directed at party veterans, including Vasile Bâgu and Grigore Răceanu. In turn, that event formed part of a series of purges—earlier ones had taken place in the summers of 1956 and 1957—which took place as a result of Nikita Khrushchev's Secret Speech, which alerted Gheorghiu-Dej to the possibility of losing his grip on power and led him to treat any challenge as evidence of "factionalism". In the Doncea group's case, he feared they might make inconvenient revelations about his past within the party.

=== Later years ===
After his exclusion from the party, Doncea became head of a Ialomița County collective farm, working from 1958 to March 1964. A retiree from the beginning of 1964, he was again president of the agricultural products pricing committee from February 1966 to April 1968, and an adviser to the prime minister's office, with ministerial rank, from April 1968 until his death. He was rehabilitated after Ceaușescu succeeded Gheorghiu-Dej in 1965.

Doncea was elected to the Assembly of Deputies for Argeș County in 1946 and obtained a Bucharest seat in the Great National Assembly (MAN) in 1948, holding it until 1952. Later, he sat for Vedea in the Pitești Region from 1957 to 1961. He was the MAN's President from May to September 1950. His awards included the Order of the Star of Romania, officer rank (1947); the Order of the Star of the Romanian Socialist Republic, second class (1948); and the 50th anniversary of the PCR medal (1971).
