= Vasile Roaită =

Romanian railway worker

- Born: 1914; Peșteana-Jiu, Old Kingdom
- Died: February 16, 1933 (aged 18–19); Bucharest, Kingdom of Romania
- Cause of death: Murdered by the gendarmerie
- Resting place: Izvorul Nou Cemetery
- Occupation: Railway worker
- Era: Interwar
- Employer: Căile Ferate Române
- Known for: Death during Grivița strike
- Political party: Romanian Communist Party
- Movement: Communism

Vasile Roaită (1914, Peșteana-Jiu, Gorj –16 February 1933, Bucharest) was a Romanian railway worker employed by Căile Ferate Române. He was fatally shot during the Grivița Strike of 1933 and subsequently became a proletarian hero under the communist regime of Gheorghe Gheorghiu-Dej. He is buried at the Izvorul Nou Cemetery in Bucharest.

== Legacy ==
The spa town of Eforie Sud on the Black Sea coast, named Carmen-Sylva after the pen name of Queen Elisabeth of Romania in 1928, was renamed Vasile Roaită in 1950, which it remained until 1962. Likewise, the name of the village of Umbrărești-Deal in Galați County, which had been named after General Eremia Grigorescu in 1933, was renamed Vasile Roaită from 1950 until 1996.
