= Cocu =

Cocu may refer to:

- Cocu, Argeș, a commune in Argeș County, Romania
- Le Cocu magnifique, a Belgian play by Fernand Crommelynck
- Phillip Cocu (born 1970), Dutch football manager and former player
