= Street warden =

Patroller

A street warden is someone who patrols the streets in order to aid the police at a community level. Examples include the Red Caps of London.

Street wardens (sometimes referred to as community wardens) do not have police powers, nor are they the same as police community support officers. Most street wardens have no powers, but instead have priority reports, meaning their calls for assistance are dealt with sooner. They also have specialist reporting forms to log anti-social behaviour, environmental issues, and traffic violations.

However, wardens who have gone through CSAS training are given certain powers under the Police Reform Act of 2002, allowing them to obtain your details if you have committed an offence within their role. If a person refuses and walks away there's nothing they can do other than to give that person's photograph to the police as they have no power of detention.

Some local authorities have empowered street wardens to issue on the spot fines for littering and dog fouling. Some also have the power to confiscate alcohol from youths.
