= Gheorghe Vasilichi =

Romanian Communist politician and statesman (1902–1974)

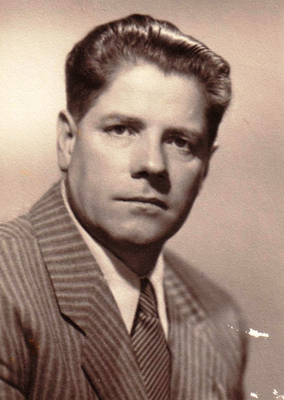

Minister of Education
- In office 14 April 1948 – 23 April 1949
- Prime Minister: Petru Groza
- Preceded by: Lothar Rădăceanu
- Succeeded by: Nicolae Popescu-Doreanu

Minister of Mines and Oil
- In office 23 April 1949 – 5 August 1950
- Preceded by: Miron Constantinescu

Personal details
- Born: 7 September 1902 Cetate, Dolj County, Kingdom of Romania
- Died: 30 October 1974 (aged 72) Piatra Neamț, Socialist Republic of Romania
- Party: Romanian Communist Party

Gheorghe Vasilichi (7 September 1902 – 30 October 1974) was a Romanian Communist politician and statesman.

== Biography ==
=== Early life and career ===
Vasilichi was born in Cetate, Dolj, in to a peasant family. He worked after school as a tinsmith and belonged to the iron and metal workers union (sindicatul fermetal) and from 1926 member of the workers and farmers block. In 1926 he became secretary of the city committee of the Union of Communist Youth (UTCdR) in Bucharest and in 1927 a member of the then Communist Party Of Romania (PCdR) and took part in 1929 as a delegate at the International Trade Union Congress in Moscow. In 1930 he took over the position of secretary of the city party committee of the PCdR in Bucharest.

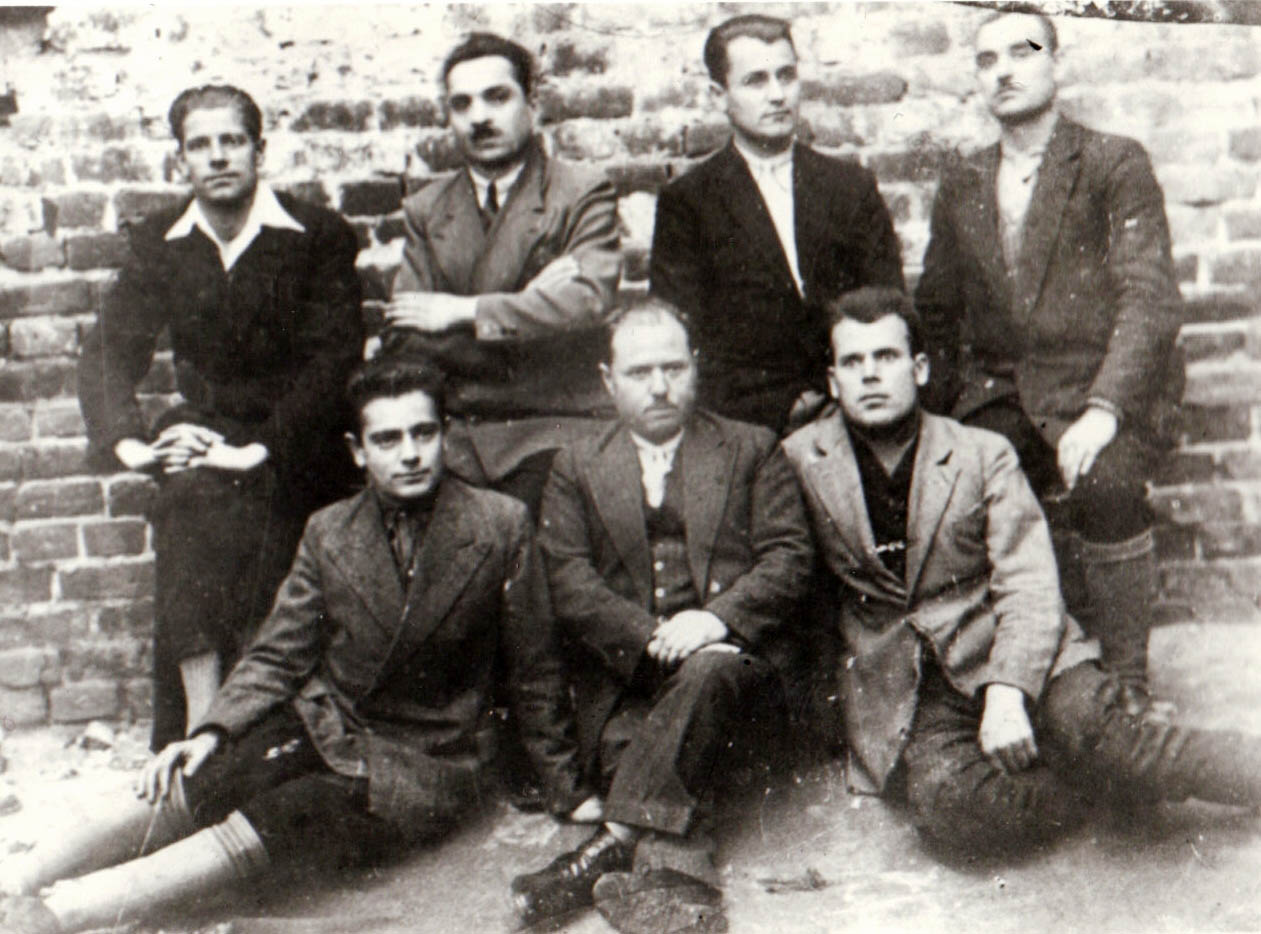
Vasilichi (top row, first from the left) with fellow communist inmates in the Craiova Prison

He was secretary of the PCdR regional party committee in Prahova County during the oil workers' strike in 1933 and arrested during the Căile Ferate Române (CFR) railway works strike in Grivița in February 1933, in which Vasile Roaită was killed. On June 4, 1934, he was sentenced by the First Corps court-martial under the law to combat crimes against public order to twelve years' imprisonment, which he served in prisons in Jilava, Văcărești, and Craiova.

After Vasilichi managed to escape in January 1935 alongside a group of fellow communists, he emigrated to the Soviet Union and took part in the Spanish Civil War as a volunteer in the International Brigades. He later took part in the French Resistance and was interned in the Dachau concentration camp after being arrested again.

=== Statesman and Minister ===
After being liberated, Vasilichi returned to Romania, where he became a member of the Central Committee of the Romanian Workers Party (PMR) at the National Conference and was a member from October 16 to 22, 1945 and was a member of this first until December 28, 1955. In 1946 he became a member of the Chamber of Deputies and represented the constituency of Prahova in this until 1948. Between December 30, 1947, and April 14, 1948, he served as Under-Secretary of State in the Ministry of National Education. In 1948 he became a member of the Great National Assembly and was a member of this until his death. He was a delegate to the Sixth Congress of the PMR from 21 to 23 February 1948, a member of the Politburo of the PMR, and was a member of these bodies until 27 May 1952.

On April 14, 1948, Vasilichi took over the position of Minister for Public Education and held it until he was replaced by Nicolae Popescu-Doreanu on April 23, 1949. He then replaced Miron Constantinescu in a cabinet reshuffle on April 23, 1949, as Minister of Mines and Oil and remained in this post until August 5, 1950. In 1951 he became President of the National Union of Craft Cooperatives (UCECOM) and remained in this post until 1969.

At the Seventh Party Congress of the PMR (23 to 28 December 1955) he became a candidate of the Central Committee of the PMR and held this position until 25 June 1960. At the Eighth Party Congress of the PMR from June 20 to 26, 1960, he was again a member of the Central Committee of the PMR and was a member of this body until his death in Piatra Neamț on October 31, 1974. Vasilichi was also a member of the executive board of the Romanian group at the Interparliamentary Union (IPU) from March 19, 1965, and chairman of the Committee on Health, Labor and Social Security.
