= Great Depression in Romania =

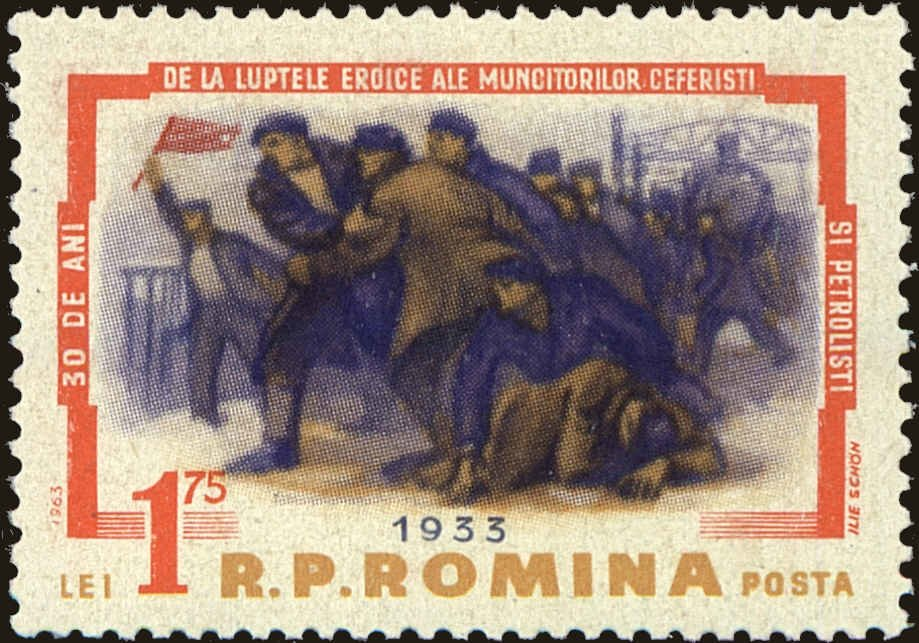
Stamp of the Romanian People's Republic commemorating the Grivița strike of 1933, provoked by poor laboral conditions as a result of the Great Depression in Romania.

The Great Depression (Romanian: Marea Criză Economică or, rarely, Marea Depresie) of 1929–1933, which affected the whole world, had several consequences in the Kingdom of Romania. Romania had been among the winner countries of World War I. It received several new territories (Bessarabia, Bukovina and Transylvania), with many natural resources. However, the war caused heavy human and economic losses to the country. Romania had to fight inflation and the non-convertibility of its currency, the Romanian leu (lei in plural). Romania then had a fundamentally agrarian economy, with agriculture accounting for 63.2% of the national production. The Great Depression affected Romania in several ways. For example, in 1933, the net national income was of 172,614,000,000 lei, only 62% of that of 1929, which was of 275,180,000,000 lei. To fight the economic crisis, the National Bank of Romania carried out various measures and the country took various loans. Help was also called upon from France.

The Great Depression led to a drop of 50% in industrial production and an increase of 300,000 persons in unemployment in Romania. By the early 1930s, the price of a quintal of wheat had fallen below the cost of harvesting it; agricultural goods, unprotected by any customs measures, were left to the discretion of international competition, which contributed to the decrease of their prices by 60–70% compared to those of 1928 and 1929. Landowners went bankrupt and the peasants had little left to eat or pay taxes to the state. By 1932, some 2.5 million farmers had unpaid debts to banks, worth 52 billion lei.

Between October 1929 and July 1931, more than 17 billion lei were withdrawn from Romanian banks. As a result, the banking system collapsed, and several banks, including the Romanian Peasantry Bank and the Bercovici Bank, went bankrupt. The banking crisis, announced as early as 1930, created a panic among depositors, as people began to withdraw their money en masse. The peak of the financial disaster was reached in 1931, when one of the most important banks in Romania, the Marmorosch Blank Bank of Aristide Blank, declared bankruptcy.

On 28 January 1933, the Grivița strike of 1933 was started at the Grivița Workshops in Bucharest by workers of Căile Ferate Române (CFR). The strike was brought about by the increasingly poor working conditions of railway employees in the context of the Great Depression in Romania.

== See also ==
- Economy of Romania
- History of Romania
