= Grivița strike of 1933 =

Labor dispute in Romania

Grivița strike
- Greva de la Atelierele CFR Grivița; Part of the Great Depression
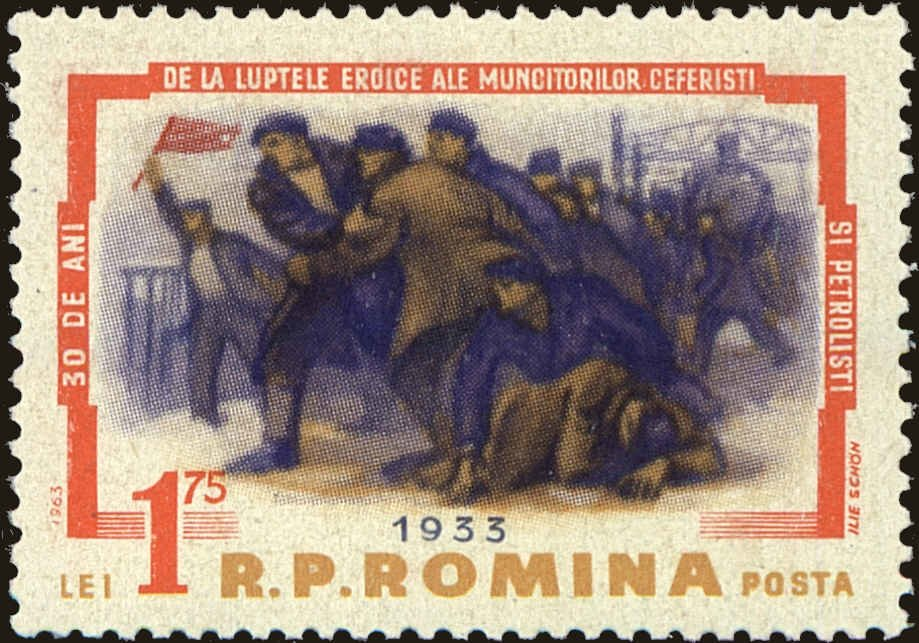
- A Poșta Română commemorative stamp for the 30th anniversary of the strike
- Date: 1933
- Location: Bucharest
- Caused by: Poor working conditions
- Methods: Strike action

Parties
Căile Ferate Române; Romanian Army; Gendarmerie	Romanian Communist Party

Lead figures
	Gheorghe Gheorghiu-Dej; Chivu Stoica; Constantin Doncea; Ilie Pintilie

Casualties
- Deaths: 7
- Injuries: 20

The Grivița strike of 1933 was a railway strike which was started at the Grivița Workshops, Bucharest, the Kingdom of Romania in February 1933 by workers of Căile Ferate Române (Romanian Railways). The strike was brought about by the increasingly poor working conditions of railway employees in the context of the worldwide Great Depression, which affected Romania significantly. As the workers occupied the workshops, the Romanian Army surrounded and sieged them. The fighting resulted in the death of 7 workers, including Vasile Roaită, a 19-year-old worker whose image was used by the early communist regime.

== Causes ==
As the Great Depression affected Romania, in 1932, the government began austerity measures, first reducing the clerks' salaries, then a reduction of blue collar workers' salaries by 25% and the cancellation of rent allowances. On 20 January 1933, the workers were announced that they would get paid only if they brought proof that they had paid all their taxes for the previous three years. The following day, the workers of the train wagon workshop (who worked outdoors) were dismissed until the weather improved.

Toward the end of 1932, the communists were able to create a "red union" (as opposed to the social-democratic unions that existed throughout the company) led by Panait Bogătoiu and Constantin Doncea, while Gheorghe Gheorghiu-Dej (who later became the leader of People's Republic of Romania) was coordinating the connection to the Communist Party. Using couriers, Gheorghiu-Dej and Moscu Cohn kept in touch with other similar unions in the Cluj and Iași railway workshops.

== Strikes ==
=== The 28 January strike ===
On 28 January, the union led by Bogătoiu decided to go on strike. Initially, the strike started at the wagon workshop, where it had the support of 700 workers who had just been temporarily dismissed, submitting the employer a list of demands. As soon as they got the news, over 3000 workers from other workshops joined the strike.

The Minister of Communications, Eduard Mirto, entered in the negotiation process between the workers and the Administration Council of the Romanian Railroads. The minister approved all the economic demands of the workers: a minimum wage of 4000 lei and a re-introduction of the rent allowance. The leaders of the social-democratic union announced that they were content with the results of the negotiations.

=== 2 February strike ===
Despite the negotiations between the government and the unions, the situation was not calm at the Grivița workshops. On 2 February, the communist union members spread manifests in the neighbourhoods, in which they announced that they believed that the government would not respect its promises and they asked for the recognition of "factory committees". Out of the 5000 workers, only 200 began working in the morning; soon after, they were convinced to stop, too. The unions announced the new demands: an "inflation allowance", a 40% increase in salaries and the recognition of the factory committees.

As the workshops were surrounded by the gendarmes and the Army, the social-democratic unions announced that they do not support these new demands and they accused the communists of creating unrest in the workers' movement. The authorities refused to negotiate and the workers stopped their strike.

=== 15 February strike ===
On 12 February, the factory committees were banned by the government because they resembled the Soviets during the October Revolution, banned all communist unions and enacted a state of emergency. The following day, the communist union secretly organized a factory committee at the railroad workshops made out of 250 workers. On the night of 14–15 February, the authorities arrested the main leaders of the union, including Bogătoiu, Doncea and Gheorghiu-Dej.

The following morning, 15 February, the workers refused to start work, demanding the release of the arrested union leaders, the recognition of the unions that were disbanded on 12 February and the removal of the state of emergency. The representative of the employer, engineer Atanasiu, refused to discuss with the workers, arguing he will only discuss with the officially sanctioned social-democratic unions. About 4000 workers barricaded themselves inside the workshops while the Army surrounded them within two hours of the beginning of the strike.

The workshop's siren brought a large crowd of supporters of the strike, among which were the workers of the following shift at the workshop. The crowd began throwing objects toward the police and, according to the government, a gun was used to shoot one street warden. Soon after, a stampede formed and the authorities were able to disperse the crowd.

== Army's siege of the workshops ==
Early in the morning of 16 February, the Army and gendarmes surrounded the workshops, the workers were summoned to surrender, threatening that they would shoot them unless they surrendered. A few workers did flee the workshop, but most remained inside. According to the government's account, the workers began shooting back. The Army sieged the workshop and within 15 minutes, all the workers surrendered.

The death toll was seven workers (three died on the spot, four in hospital) and 20 workers were wounded; two soldiers were killed. According to the account of Chivu Stoica, who participated in the event, one of the soldiers who died was in fact killed by an officer after pleading to fellow soldiers not to shoot the workers, because they "cannot be the killers of their own brothers".

Among the workers killed by the Army was Vasile Roaită, a 19-year-old worker whose image was used by the early communist regime as a martyr. He was alleged to have been the worker who sounded the siren to announce the strike to the neighbourhood. However, in 1997, another worker, Constantin Negrea, said that he was in fact the worker who sounded it and that in 1944, Gheorghiu-Dej and Chivu Stoica asked him to give up his claim in order that Roaită is a hero after his death.

== Sentences ==
Gheorghiu-Dej was sentenced to 12 years' forced labour by the courts of the Kingdom of Romania for his role in organising the Grivița strike. He escaped in 1944, and after the installation of the communist regime in Romania in 1948, became the country's de facto ruler as General Secretary of the Romanian Communist Party.
