= Gheorghe Gheorghiu-Dej =

Leader of Romania from 1947 to 1965

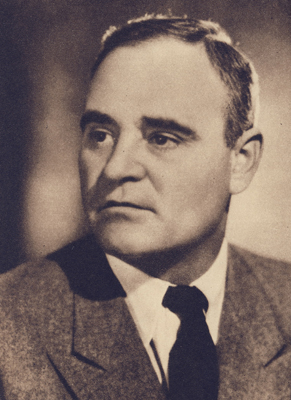
- Official portrait, 1948

General Secretary of the Romanian Communist Party^{[a]}
- In office 30 September 1955 – 19 March 1965
- Preceded by: Gheorghe Apostol
- Succeeded by: Nicolae Ceaușescu
- In office 2 October 1944 – 19 April 1954
- Preceded by: Ștefan Foriș
- Succeeded by: Gheorghe Apostol

President of the State Council
- In office 21 March 1961 – 19 March 1965
- Preceded by: Ion Gheorghe Maurer (as President of the Presidium of Great National Assembly)
- Succeeded by: Chivu Stoica

President of the Council of Ministers
- In office 2 June 1952 – 2 October 1955
- Preceded by: Petru Groza
- Succeeded by: Chivu Stoica

First Vice President of the Council of Ministers
- In office 15 April 1948 – 2 June 1952
- Prime Minister: Petru Groza
- Preceded by: Gheorghe Tătărescu

Minister of Industry and Commerce
- In office 1 December 1946 – 14 April 1948
- Prime Minister: Petru Groza
- Preceded by: Petre Bejan

Minister of Public Works
- In office 6 March 1945 – 30 November 1946
- Prime Minister: Petru Groza
- Preceded by: Virgil Solomon
- Succeeded by: Ion Gh. Vântu

Minister of Communications
- In office 4 November 1944 – 30 November 1946
- Prime Minister: Constantin Sănătescu; Nicolae Rădescu; Petru Groza
- Succeeded by: Nicolae Profiri

Personal details
- Born: Gheorghe Gheorghiu; 8 November 1901 Bârlad, Romania
- Died: 19 March 1965 (aged 63) Bucharest, Romania
- Resting place: Carol Park (until 1991); Bellu Cemetery (after 1991)
- Party: Communist Party of Romania (1930–1965)
- Spouse: Maria Alexe
- Children: 2
- De facto leader of the RPR (in role with Ana Pauker until 1952): ← (First in role); Ceaușescu →
- a. First Secretary of the Romanian Worker's Party (from February 1948)

Gheorghe Gheorghiu-Dej (Note: Romanian pronunciation: [ˈɡe̯orɡe ɡe̯orˈɡi.u ˈdeʒ]) (8 November [O.S. 26 October] 1901 – 19 March 1965) was a Romanian politician. He was the first communist leader of Romania from 1947 to 1965, serving as first secretary of the Romanian Communist Party (ultimately "Romanian Workers' Party", PMR) from 1944 to 1954 and from 1955 to 1965, and as the first communist Prime Minister of Romania from 1952 to 1955.

Born in Bârlad, Gheorghiu-Dej was involved in the communist movement's activities from the early 1930s. Upon the outbreak of World War II in Europe, he was imprisoned by Ion Antonescu's regime in the Târgu Jiu internment camp, and escaped only in August 1944. After the forces of King Michael ousted Antonescu and had him arrested for war crimes, Gheorghiu-Dej together with prime-minister Petru Groza pressured the King into abdicating in December 1947, marking the onset of out-and-out communist rule in Romania.

Under his rule, Romania was considered one of the Soviet Union's most loyal satellite states, though Gheorghiu-Dej was partially unnerved by the rapid de-Stalinization policy initiated by Nikita Khrushchev at the end of the 1950s. Gheorghiu-Dej stepped up measures that greatly increased trade relations between Romania and the Western countries. At the same time his government committed human rights violations within the country.

He died of lung cancer in March 1965. His once protégé Nicolae Ceaușescu succeeded him as General Secretary.

== Early life ==
Gheorghiu-Dej was the son of a poor worker from Bârlad, his father was Tănase Gheorghiu and his mother, Ana. At the age of two he was adopted by his uncle Nicolae Gheorghe Ionescu from Moinești, Bacău County and attended secondary school in the current school no. 1 "Ștefan Luchian". After finishing school, he worked at a sawmill, at a weaving mill, and then worked for carpenters in Piatra Neamț and Moinești. He also had a younger sister named Tinca Gheorghiu.

== Career ==
Poverty made him leave school early on and start working at the age of 11. Due to his age and the lack of professional training, he often changed jobs, eventually settling to be an electrician. Working at a factory in Comănești, he joined the workers' union and participated in the 1920 Romanian general strike, during which all the participants were dismissed.

A year later, he was hired as an electrician at the Galați tramway company, where he was also fired after organizing protests against the 9-hour workday and for higher wages. He was later hired by the Romanian Railways (CFR) workshops in Galați.

As the workers' standard of living was already low, the Great Depression in Romania began eroding it much more so. In 1930, Gheorghiu became more politically active, joining the Communist Party of Romania. He was assigned to organize agitation in the Romanian Railways workshops in Moldavia.

On 15 August 1931, Gheorghiu was accused of "communist agitation" and punitively transferred to Dej, a town in Transylvania, where he continued the union activity. The union presented a petition in February 1932 to the CFR Railways, demanding better working conditions and higher wages. As a response, the CFR Railways closed down the Dej plant and fired all the workers, including Gheorghiu, who was deprived of the opportunity to be hired by any other CFR Railways workshop in the country.

=== Activist ===
During this time, Gheorghiu got the moniker Gheorghiu-Dej (from Dej, Romania where he'd been sent by the party) from the Siguranța (secret police), in order for his name to be differentiated from other union activists called Gheorghiu. After his dismissal from the CFR Railways workshop, Gheorghiu became even more active in organizing the unions and coordinating the workers of Iași, Pașcani, and Galați.

On the night of 14–15 July 1932, he was arrested for placing "subversive posters on the walls and poles of Giulești Road", being held in the Văcărești Prison. Defended by lawyer Iosif Schraier, he was freed because the posters were meant to be related to the elections, during the electoral campaign for the 1932 Romanian general election.

Gheorghiu-Dej was briefly arrested again on 3 October 1932, at the end of a workers' meeting in Iași, after he urged the workers to "unite for the fight against the capitalist class", on alleged charges of having hit a police commissioner. He was freed as the charges were found to be false.

In January 1933, the Romanian Government announced some even more stringent austerity measures that included new wages cuts, which led to the radicalization of the workers. Gheorghiu-Dej, together with union president Constantin Doncea, led the Bucharest workers to the big strike that became known as the CFR Railways Grivița Strike of 1933.

As the negotiations failed, the government feared a general strike, so it declared a state of siege in Bucharest and other cities. Gheorghiu-Dej was arrested during the night of 14–15 February 1933.

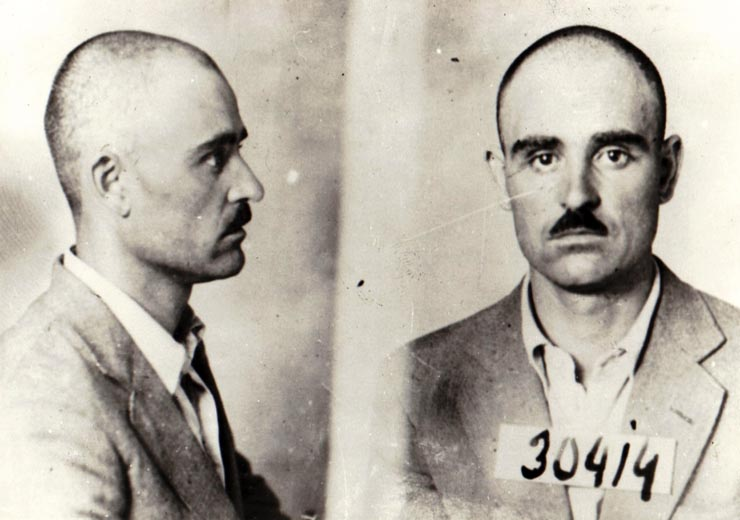
A mugshot of Dej taken after his 1933 arrest

=== In prison ===
Gheorghiu-Dej was sentenced to prison in the same year by a military court, serving time in Doftana and in other facilities. In 1935–1936 he was detained at Ocnele Mari Prison, together with Chivu Stoica. In 1936 he was elected to the party's Central Committee and became leader of the prison faction of the communist party (party members who were incarcerated in Romania, a term distinguishing them from party members living in exile, mainly in the Soviet Union: the Muscovite faction).

As a known activist, he was detained at Târgu Jiu internment camp during all of Ion Antonescu's regime and most of World War II period, and escaped only on 10 August 1944, a few days before the fall of the regime. He became general secretary in 1944 after the Soviet occupation, but did not consolidate his power until 1952, after he purged Ana Pauker and her Muscovite faction comrades from power. Ana Pauker had been the unofficial leader of the Party since the end of the war.

While in prison, Gheorghiu-Dej met Nicolae Ceaușescu. They were imprisoned after a rally organized by the communist party, of which both Ceaușescu and Gheorghiu-Dej were members. Gheorghiu-Dej taught Ceaușescu in prison Marxist-Leninist theories and principles, and kept him close as Gheorghiu-Dej steadily gained power after their release from prison in 1944. During 1946–1947, he was a member of Romania's Gheorghe Tătărescu-led delegation to the Paris Peace Conference.

== Political career ==
=== Under Soviet directives ===
On 30 December 1947, Gheorghiu-Dej and Prime Minister Petru Groza forced King Michael I to abdicate. Years later, Albanian Communist leader Enver Hoxha alleged that Gheorghiu-Dej personally pulled a gun on the King and threatened to kill him unless he gave up the throne. Hours later, Parliament, fully dominated by Communists and their allies after the elections held a year earlier, abolished the monarchy and declared Romania a People's Republic. From this moment onward, Gheorghiu-Dej was the de facto most powerful man in Romania.

Soviet influence in Romania under Joseph Stalin favoured Gheorghiu-Dej, largely seen as a local leader with strong Marxist-Leninist principles. The economic influence of Moscow was protected by the creation of the "Sov-Rom" companies, which directed Romania's commercial exchanges to unprofitable markets (mainly the Soviet Union). Up until Stalin's death and even afterwards, Gheorghiu-Dej did not amend repressive policies, such as the works employing penal labour on the Danube-Black Sea Canal. On orders from Gheorghiu-Dej, Romania implemented also the massive forced collectivization of land in the rural areas.

=== Creation of heavy industry ===
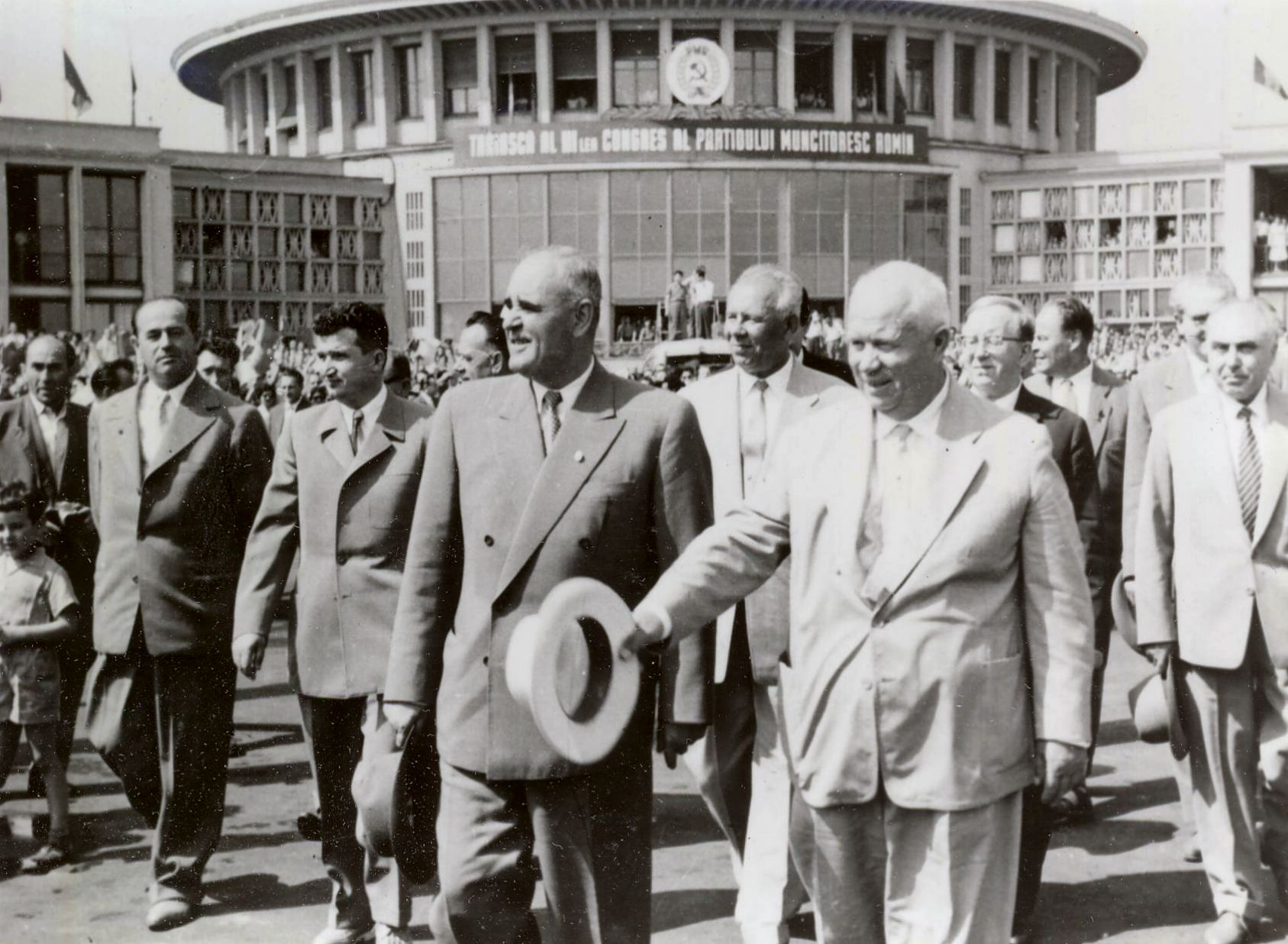
Gheorghiu-Dej with Nikita Khrushchev at Bucharest's Băneasa Airport in June 1960. Ceaușescu can be seen at Gheorghiu-Dej's right hand side

Gheorghiu-Dej became the architect of a new semi-autonomous foreign and economic policy under the Warsaw Pact and CAER at the end of the sixth decade. He decided to create a heavy industry, an initiative that contradicted the Muscovite plans that had reserved for Romania the role of granary of the communist bloc. Thus, the Galați Steel Plant was created, the construction of which was to be made with funds from the IMF. Production was based on iron ore imported from India and Australia. In 1952, construction began of the Borzești Petrochemical Platform with the first combine (Refinery no. 10) and the related city of Onești, mostly with the workforce of political prisoners. Also, in 1953, the Bârlad Bearing Company was put into operation, which later developed reaching a number of approx. 9,000 employees, about 1/9 of the city's population (approx. 80,000 inhabitants in 1989).

Romania became one of the world's leading steel-producing countries, the machine building industry expanded considerably, and the chemical industry was overdeveloped, with an oil refining capacity far in excess of domestic raw material production. Romania began to produce, at high cost prices but of inferior quality, civil and military aircraft, tanks, maritime vessels, helicopters, automobiles and computers.

A large-scale development was achieved by three industrial branches: the steel industry, the petrochemical industry and the machine building industry. Romania, lacking sufficient sources of domestic raw materials, was forced to rely on imports, sometimes obtained at extremely high prices. In addition, the decrease in demand for steel, of machine tools and petrochemical products on the world market, in the last decade of the Gheorghiu-Dej regime, limited the possibilities of exporting Romanian industrial products and, implicitly, massively reduced the foreign exchange funds thus obtained. The lack of competitiveness of Romanian products, mainly due to their poor quality and outdated technologies, forced Romania to sell its industrial goods at prices lower than their production costs, mostly on Third World markets and often within barter or credit exchanges.

=== Personal rule ===
The first five years of the Romanian People's Republic saw a period of collective leadership, with fellow traveler Groza serving as prime minister. Gheorghiu-Dej was named first vice president of the Council of Ministers (first deputy prime minister) in 1948, though as party leader he held most of the real power.

However, in 1952, Groza stepped down from the premiership and became head of state as Chairman of the Presidium of the Great National Assembly. Gheorghiu-Dej succeeded him, becoming the first Communist to hold the post.

Gheorghiu-Dej briefly gave up the first secretaryship of the Communist Party in 1954 to Gheorghe Apostol, retaining the premiership. However, he was still the actual leader of Romania, and he regained the party leadership in 1955, at the same time handing the premiership to Chivu Stoica. In 1961, he became head of state as the president of the newly created State Council.

Gheorghiu-Dej was at first unsettled by Nikita Khrushchev's reforms in the new process of De-Stalinization. He then became the architect of Romania's semi-autonomous foreign and economic policy within the Warsaw Pact and the Comecon, in the late 1950s, notably by initiating the creation of a heavy industry in Romania which went against Soviet directions for the Eastern Bloc as a whole (e.g., the new large-scale steel plant in Galați, which relied on iron resources imported from India and Australia). Ironically, Romania under Gheorghiu-Dej was once considered one of the most loyal among the Soviet satellites, and thus there is a tendency to forget "who first established the pattern of foreign policy openness and 'liberalness' coupled with domestic repression". The ideological steps undertaken were made clear by the ousting of the "Sov-Rom" companies, together with the toning down of Soviet-Romanian common cultural ventures. In 1958 the Red Army withdrew its last troops from Romania (a personal achievement of Gheorghiu-Dej). The official History of Romania made then reference to a Romanian Bessarabia, as well as other topics which tensed relations between the two communist countries. Moreover, the final years of Dej's regime saw the publishing of Karl Marx—newly discovered—texts dealing with Russia's imperial policy in previously Romanian and now Soviet regions.

Yet, the Securitate was still Dej's instrument of choice, and Romania joined the other Warsaw Pact countries' wave of repression after the Hungarian Revolution of 1956 – incidentally, Hungarian leader Imre Nagy was shortly detained on Romanian soil.

In his late years, Gheorghiu-Dej established diplomatic relations with the First World, including the United States. Such steps were highly encouraged by President Lyndon B. Johnson, who had come to see Romania as an almost friendly Communist country in the Cold War context (1963). Also, many political prisoners were released in 1964.

=== Interaction with the West ===
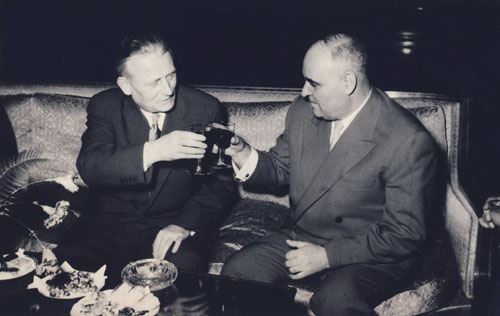
Gheorghiu-Dej sharing a toast with Antonín Novotný, President of Czechoslovakia

In the early years of Gheorghiu-Dej's rule, Romania's relations with the West were tense, marked by accusations of United States espionage and Romanian human rights violations. There were also low levels of trade between Romania and the West, as Romania tied itself to the Soviet Union and the other satellite nations; in 1950, Romania's economic plan involved 89% of trade to be solely with the Soviet Bloc.

Later, however, Romania's willingness to trade with the West became more apparent. For example, 1952 saw the first publication of the journal Romanian Foreign Trade, which offered opportunities to Western traders to buy Romanian goods, such as petroleum and grain. Western publications also recognized the potential for Romania to sell its products on the world market. An article from The Times of 29 August 1953 wrote: "[Romania] could, for instance, it is thought, obtain higher prices on the world market for much of what she is forced to export to Russia, foodstuffs included, in return for machinery and aid", As Gheorghiu-Dej realized, if Romania were able to trade with the West the standard of living would likely rise.

From 1953, the West gradually relaxed their export controls, which had limited the products that the U.S., Great Britain, and France could export to Eastern Europe. Gheorghiu-Dej, eager to establish interaction between Romania and the West, relaxed travel restraints on Western diplomats in Bucharest and allowed Western journalists more access to Romania. In early 1954, Romania also appealed to Great Britain about having talks to resolve Romania's outstanding claims, to which Great Britain agreed in December of that year.

Romania's foreign policy towards the West was closely tied to its policy toward the Soviet Union; Romania could only develop trading with the West if it asserted its independence from the intensely anti-West Soviet Union. Gheorghiu-Dej realized this, and thus emphasized Romania's sovereignty. In the Second Party Congress, which opened on 23 December 1955, Gheorghiu-Dej gave a five-hour speech in which he stressed the idea of national communism and Romania's right to follow its own interests, rather than be forced to follow another's (referring to the Soviet Union). Gheorghiu-Dej also discussed opening up trade with the West. In an attempt to increase the dialogue between Romania and the West, in 1956 Gheorghiu-Dej instructed the new ambassador to the U.S. to meet with both Secretary of State John Foster Dulles and then with President Dwight D. Eisenhower. As a result of these meetings, the U.S. Department of State expressed interest in increasing the interaction between the two nations, including possibly establishing a library in Bucharest.

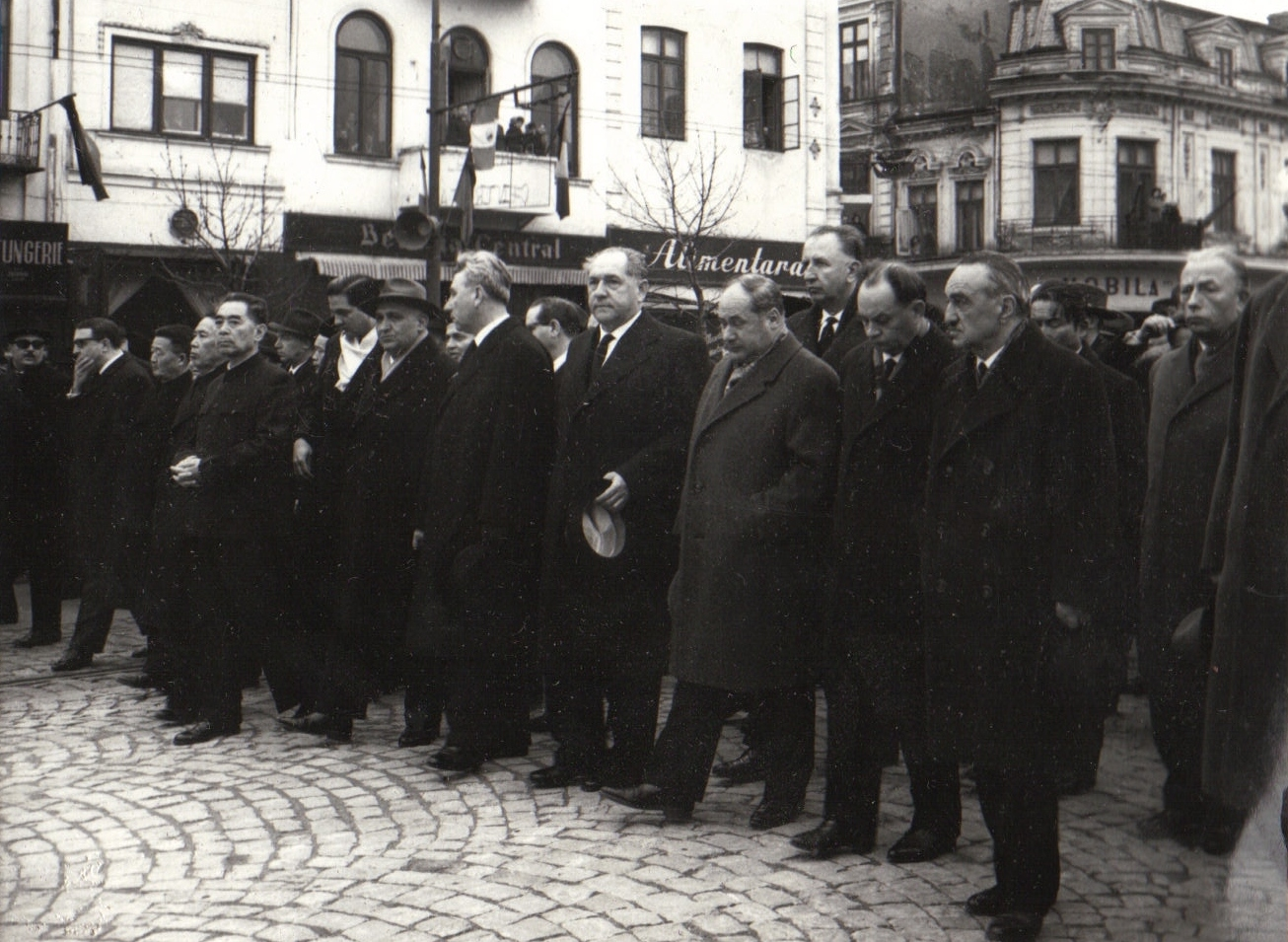
Foreign communist leaders at Gheorghiu-Dej's funeral, including Zhou Enlai at left and Anastas Mikoyan at right

Romania's interaction with the West temporarily decreased, however, with the 1956 Hungarian Revolution and the violent response of the Soviet Union to the uprising. Gheorghiu-Dej continued to strengthen the independence from the Soviet Union. For example, Romanian schools dropped the Russian language requirement. Additionally, Romania endorsed the Moscow Declaration of 1957 which stated that "Socialist countries base their relations on the principles of complete equality, respect for territorial integrity, state independence and sovereignty, and non-interference in one another's affairs… The socialist states also advocate the general expansion of economic and cultural relations with all other countries…" These statements coincided with Gheorghiu-Dej's claims to national sovereignty and independence.

By 1957 Romania had substantially increased its Western trade; in that year trade with the West had increased to 25% of Romania's total trade. By the early 1960s, Romania under Gheorghiu-Dej was more industrialized and productive. After World War II 80% of the population had worked in agriculture, but by 1963, 65% did. Despite the decrease in hands working the land, agricultural productivity had actually increased. Additionally, Gheorghiu-Dej had successfully begun a strong shift in trade towards the West, further separating it from the Soviet Union; Romania imported much of its industrial equipment from West Germany, Great Britain, and France. This trade pattern followed Gheorghiu-Dej's economic plan, which he made clear to Great Britain and France in 1960, when he sent his head of foreign intelligence to Paris and London in order to clarify Romania's desire to interact with the West and disregard Comecon orders.

By 1964 Gheorghiu-Dej had made a trading agreement with the U.S. that allowed Romania to buy industrial products from them. The agreement came as a result of U.S. businesses' complaints that they were losing money to Western Europe. During his presidency, President John F. Kennedy, concerned with these businesses' losses, used his powers to increase trade between the U.S. and Eastern Europe, a policy which President Lyndon Johnson also followed.

Thus, Gheorghiu-Dej greatly increased trade with the West, making Romania the first Soviet Bloc country to independently trade with the West. Through his policy of national sovereignty, Gheorghiu-Dej increased the popularity of Romania in the West. National U.S. publications moved away from reports in the early 1950s of human rights abuses and oppression, towards articles from the mid-1950s to the early 1960s of Romanian de-satellization. In the early 1960s, The Times also reported often on Gheorghiu-Dej's and Romania's increased economic ties with the West. Gheorghiu-Dej's successful efforts to expand Romania's foreign relations, especially those with the West, were evident at his March 1965 funeral, attended by 33 foreign delegations, including a special French envoy sent by General Charles de Gaulle. Gheorghiu-Dej's policies set the stage for his successor, Nicolae Ceaușescu, to carry Romania's new course even further.

== Death and legacy ==
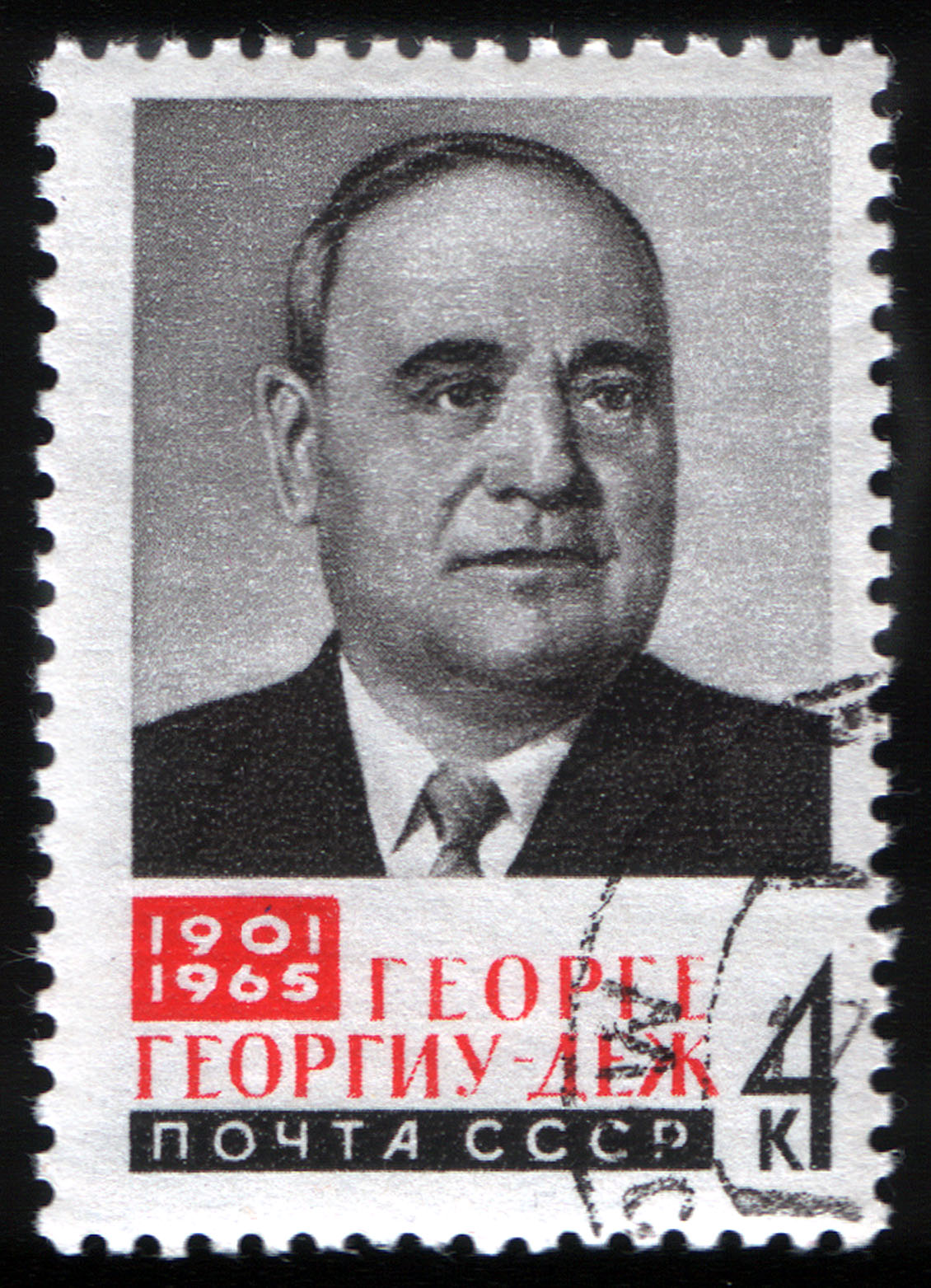
Soviet stamp featuring Gheorghiu-Dej

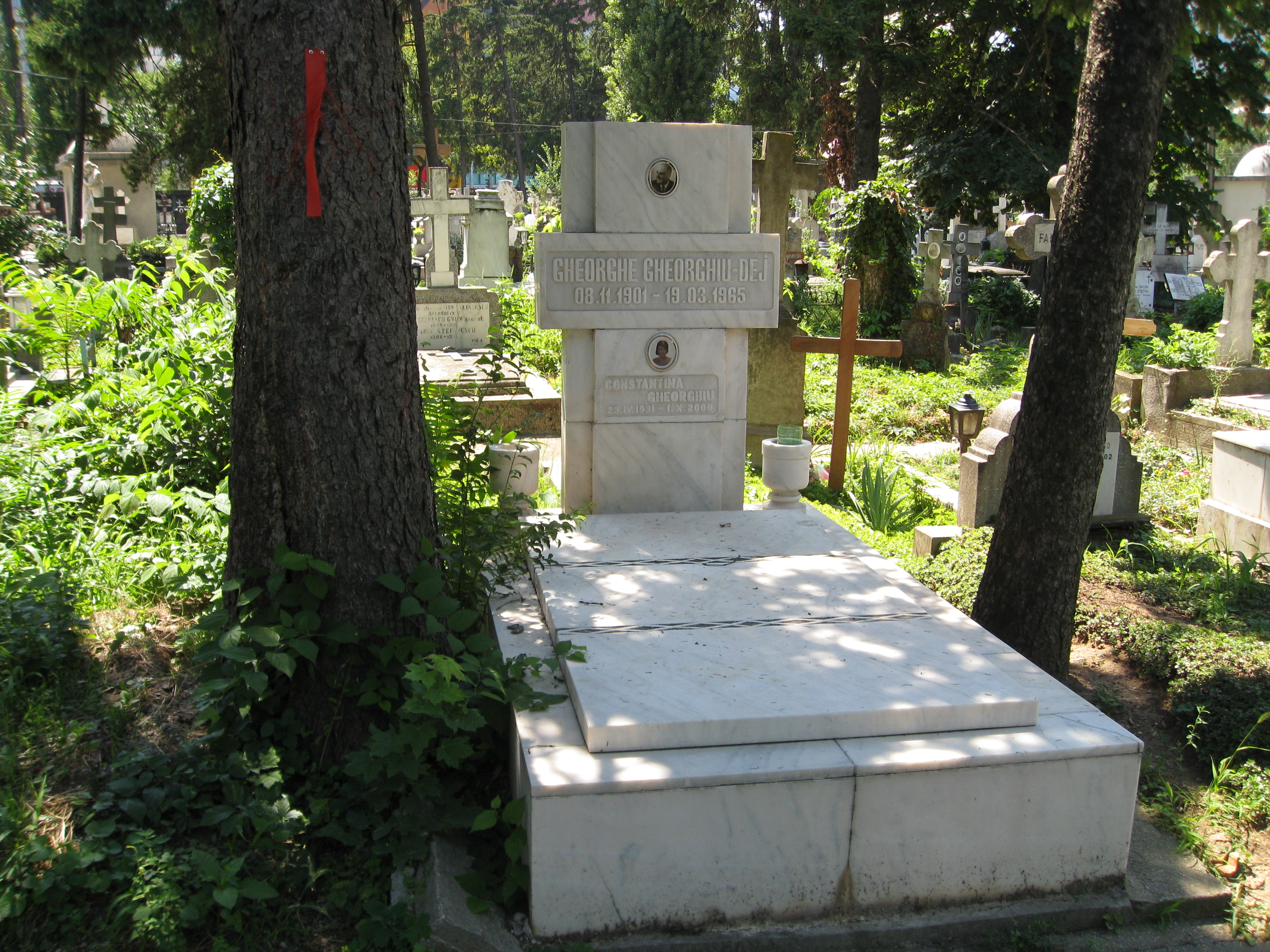
Gheorghiu-Dej's grave at Bellu Cemetery in Bucharest

Gheorghiu-Dej died of lung cancer in Bucharest on 19 March 1965. Gheorghe Apostol has claimed that Gheorghiu-Dej himself designated him party leader in waiting; in any case many perceived him as such in 1965. Prime Minister Ion Gheorghe Maurer, who had developed hostility towards him, made sure that Apostol was prevented from taking power, rallying the Party leadership instead around longtime Gheorghiu-Dej protégé Nicolae Ceaușescu. Securitate general Ion Mihai Pacepa, who defected to the United States in 1978, wrote that Ceaușescu had allegedly told him about "ten international leaders the Kremlin killed or tried to kill"; Gheorghiu-Dej was among them.

Gheorghiu-Dej was buried in a mausoleum in Liberty Park (now Carol Park) in Bucharest. In 1991, after the Romanian Revolution, his body was exhumed and reburied at Bellu Cemetery. The Polytechnic Institute of Bucharest, renamed to Polytechnic Institute "Gheorghe Gheorghiu-Dej" Bucharest in his honour, is now known as the Politehnica University of Bucharest. In the early 1950s, one of the Sectors of Bucharest (roughly, the present-day Sector 6) was named after him. The city of Onești was once named Gheorghe Gheorghiu-Dej. Also, the Russian city of Liski was, from 1965 to 1990, named Georgiu-Dezh in his honour.

Gheorghiu-Dej was married to Maria Alexe and they had two daughters, Vasilica (1928–1987) and Constantina (1931–2000).

== Notes ==
Party political offices
Preceded by Ștefan Foriș	General Secretary of the Romanian Communist Party; 1944–1954	Succeeded by Gheorghe Apostol
Preceded by Gheorghe Apostol	General Secretary of the Romanian Workers' Party; 1955–1965	Succeeded by Nicolae Ceaușescu
