= Văcărești Prison =

Former prison in Bucharest, Romania

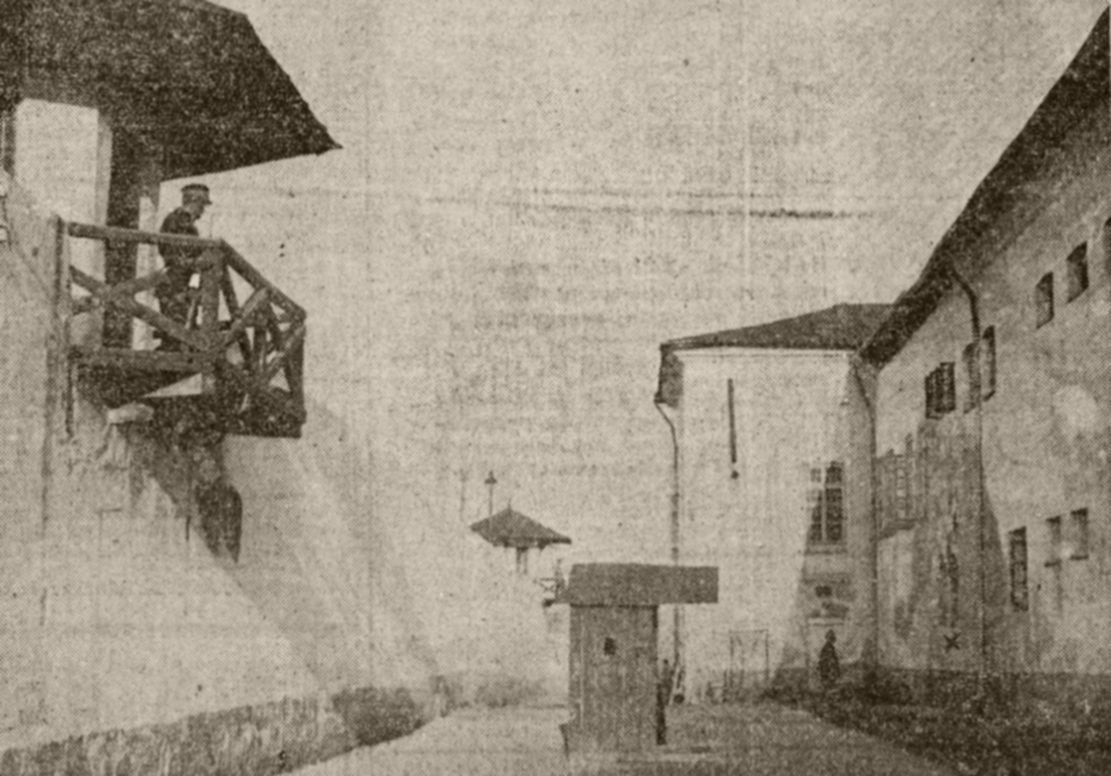
- Inner courtyard in September 1932
- Interactive map of Văcărești Prison
- Location: Văcărești, Bucharest, Romania; 44°23′45″N 26°07′24″E
- Status: Closed
- Security class: Minimum to maximum
- Capacity: 400–4,000
- Opened: 1736 (de facto); 1865 (de jure)
- Closed: 1973
- Managed by: Romanian Ministry of Internal Affairs

Văcărești Prison (Romanian: Închisoarea Văcărești, also Penitenciarul Văcărești; known euphemistically as Mandravela) was a penal facility located in the eponymous quarter of southern Bucharest, Romania, and developed around Văcărești Monastery. It originally extended the latter's functions as a jail in the autonomous realm of Wallachia, emerging as a major processing center for political detainees after the Wallachian Revolution of 1848. In 1864, shortly after the Romanian Principality had been established, the monastery was confiscated by the state; it became a leading state prison in 1865. Though its regime was largely permissive and centered on penal reform for common criminals, Văcărești came to be used in isolating opposition politicians—initially from the liberal camp. These functions were enhanced under the Kingdom of Romania (1881–1948). In quick succession, Văcărești hosted groups associated with the Social Democratic Workers' Party and the peasant rioters of 1907. The institution was traditionally scrutinized by critics for its overcrowding, inadequate plumbing, allegations of mistreatment and corruption, as well as its controversial role in pre-trial detention—which left arrestees in close proximity to hardened criminals. Penal labor was used in various ways, including some that provided material benefits to the inmates; the Obregia psychiatric hospital, located in neighboring Berceni, was largely built by convicts.

During World War I, Văcărești was used by both the Romanian state, for detaining spies and anti-war activists, and the Central Powers (which occupied southern Romania in 1916), for punishing seditious socialists. The restored kingdom incarcerated former collaborators with the enemy, including writers Tudor Arghezi and Ioan Slavici (both of whom left ample records of their Văcărești confinement); they were held alongside instigators of the 1918 labor strike, whose leader I. C. Frimu died in confinement. The state went on to incarcerate in Văcărești the adherents of Bolshevism, from the terrorist Max Goldstein to many inaugural members of the Romanian Communist Party; in 1923, it also used the prison for rounding up far-right revolutionists, including Corneliu Zelea Codreanu (whose Iron Guard traced its origins and political symbolism to prison life in Văcărești). The complex was in the process of being donated to the Romanian Orthodox Church, but the project was shelved. During World War II, it was intensively used by Ion Antonescu's dictatorship for rounding up communists, alleged spies, and people tried for economic sabotage, alongside participants in an Iron Guard-led uprising. The compound was damaged by and earthquake in November 1940, and by Allied carpet-bombing in 1944; allegations of misuse and corruption also resurfaced, with claims that prison inspector Alexandru Petrescu was exploiting female inmates and that Guardists were effectively running the prison from the inside.

Following the anti-fascist coup of August 1944, Văcărești continued to hold Guardist prisoners, but alongside figures of the Antonescu regime, and, in growing numbers, liberal critics of the Communist Party. The latter inaugurated a communist regime in late 1947, upon which a large part of the prison system, managed by the former Văcărești inmates Teohari Georgescu and Alexandru Drăghici, was opened up for anti-communists of various hues. Văcărești was used as a transit prison, with its population reaching over 4,000, from a previous 1,000 and a recommended 400. Conditions worsened, but were generally above the level of other jails and camps; its rudimentary hospital was used to gather up inmates with serious diseases, as well as victims of torture—with many of them dying at Văcărești, into the 1960s.

Communist leader Gheorghe Gheorghiu-Dej kept a watch on Securitate activities and approved of some basic improvements in the prisoners' regimen. His reforms were enhanced and accelerated during his embrace of de-Stalinization, eventually leading to a general amnesty of all political prisoners in 1964. Dej's successor, Nicolae Ceaușescu, initially allowed for Văcărești to be used in detaining common criminals (and, more discreetly, regime critics held under various pretexts), but ordered it evacuated in 1973. The buildings were used by various institutions, or left in a state of disrepair, until being controversially razed, together with the historic church, in the urban systematization of the 1980s. The abandoned grounds became a wildlife area, eventually included in the Văcărești Nature Park.

== Early history ==
=== Foundation ===
The prison dates back to the existence of autonomous Wallachia. The monastery, a central building of the complex, was commissioned by Prince Nicholas Mavrocordatos, on land donated by Constantin Văcărescu, and was completed in 1736. As one of the larger monasteries in Wallachia, it came to serve multiple purposes, one of which was that of a penal facility tied to the princely court. Successive princes allowed the monks to handle the inmates' spiritual education, which included their being forced to attend mass, and their parading around Bucharest alongside beggars and the infirm. This function was largely ignored after several reigns, since the monastic community acquired wealth and was dedicated to Mount Athos, allowing it to function independent of Wallachian customs. Sometimes used as a temporary princely residence, Văcărești first became a field hospital of the Imperial Russian Army during the occupation of 1811. The idea was revisited under the Regulamentul Organic regime by Governor Pavel Kiselyov, who turned Văcărești into a quarantine facility, helping to control the spread of cholera. The first decree mandating that the site be redesigned as a prison came in 1831, but was in practice ignored for over a decade.

The issue became more stringent after the fire of March 1847, which destroyed the city jail at Sfântul Anton Square, prompting the creation of a makeshift facility at Dealul Spirii—itself abandoned after an outbreak of typhus. After the abortive nationalist uprising of 1848, the Wallachian state used the monastery for temporarily holding captured revolutionaries, including Ion Brătianu, Ion Ghica, Ion Heliade Rădulescu, Gheorghe Magheru, and C. A. Rosetti. While these figures were forced into exile, a number of longer-term inmates from the revolutionary rank-and-file continued to populate Văcărești, with some 92 such political prisoners attested there in November 1849. Among them was a troupe of actors, including Costache Mihăileanu, who had staged nationalist plays, but also thespian Costache Halepliu, who had turned in his colleagues. Văcărești's political prisoners included Scarlat Turnavitu and his brother Ștefan. The latter was dispatched to Colțea Hospital after being diagnosed with tuberculosis, while Scarlat was moved between prison-monasteries until being ultimately pardoned in 1851.

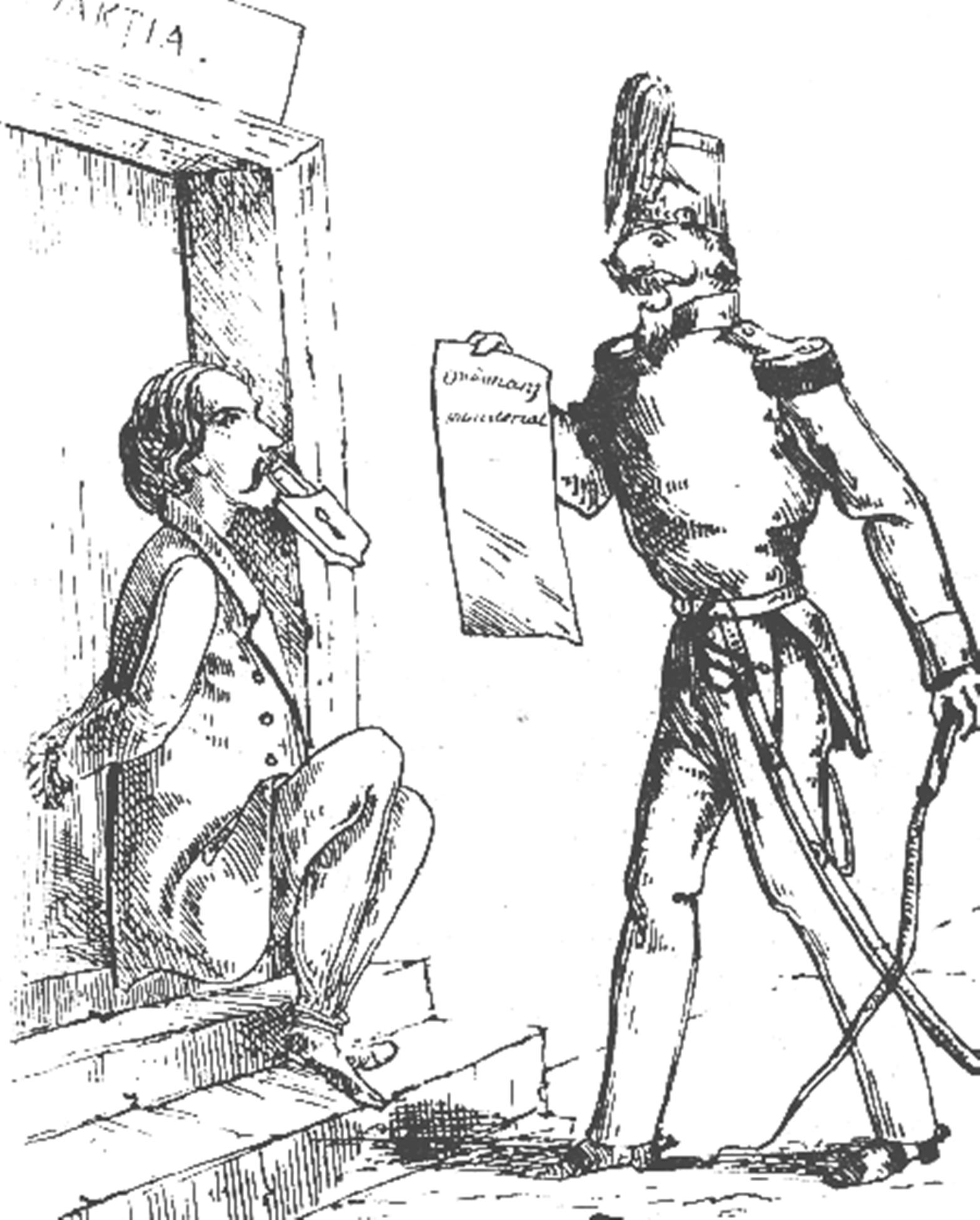
1859 caricature mocking the repression of journalists by Alexandru Ioan Cuza

Despite the change of regimes following the state-creation of 1859, the resulting Principality of Romania continued to employ Văcărești as a center for regular punishment and political repression. Domnitor Alexandru Ioan Cuza made a point of using it uninterruptedly, with one popular legend suggesting that he did so specifically to punish the monks, whom he regarded as equal to the "thieves" who would end up sharing their lodgings. Defendants found guilty of press offenses against Cuza were held at the former monastery beginning in 1861. Examples include Radu Ionescu, N. T. Orășanu, and I. G. Valentineanu, as well as, in 1863, the poet Constantin D. Aricescu.

The prison was only formalized as an institution in 1865, after the secularization of monastic estates. Cuza was however interested in improving conditions, having brought with him from Moldavia the prison reformer Ferdinand Dodun de Perrières, who went on to establish an industrial center at the former monastery. Staffed by the inmates themselves, it originally included a bakery and a large greenhouse, which provided flowers for the Bucharest markets. Workers were taught trades, and could preserve up to a third of the resulting profits. Cuza was ultimately deposed by the "monstrous coalition" in February 1866. His captors treated him with deference, and, before sending into exile, held him under watch in two spacious rooms of the prison complex. His replacement, Carol I, visited the compound in October 1872, personally granting pardons and sentence reductions. Carol did not interfere with the reformist agenda, and Dodun de Perrières kept his post until 1876.

=== Post-1866 growth ===
During the 1870s, Văcărești was officially designated as a detention center for the entire Ilfov County, including the whole of Bucharest. It was also a place of triage, detaining prisoners whose cases were ongoing. Also held there were men sentenced to a maximum of five years and women, who lived in the former abbot's house, with sentences up to three months; those with longer terms were sent to Mislea Prison. Two doctors were hired in 1868, marking the start of medical care at the facility. While the surrounding neighborhood was an independent village throughout the late 19th century, the prison's southern border was also regarded as Bucharest's outer limit, down to at least 1893. By 1900, the area was served by its own highway, called Calea Văcărești and paved to exactly the prison gate. The near-adjacent mound known as Dealul Piscului only came to be settled by homesteaders after that date.

Around then, the political battles between the conservative "Whites" and the "Red" liberals were sometimes played out at Văcărești. In March 1875, liberal journalist Alexandru Macedonski was arrested and held there on charges of sedition, but acquitted by a jury after a three-month trial. He made fun of his captors in a poem titled "My Cell in Văcărești". After a spat of violence during the April 1875 election, Prime Minister Lascăr Catargiu ordered that the "Red" agitator, Nicolae Fleva, be detained for a 30-day period at the Văcărești compound. During subsequent negotiations, Catargiu's associate Ion Bălăceanu prepared to have the "Red" leader, Brătianu, similarly punished, but was told by Domnitor Carol to disengage. This allowed room for the "Reds" to establish a more moderate National Liberal Party, which became a staple of Romanian politics. In June 1876, the National Liberal George D. Vernescu, who had begun serving as minister of the interior, issued a public notification to the Justice Ministry, arguing that Văcărești's function in pre-trial detention was scandalous. Vernescu informed the public that the accused were lodged alongside hardened criminals, and that examining magistrates made little effort to speed up procedures. He reported that one detainee had spent eight months awaiting trial, only to be handed a 15-day sentence. Around 1880, Mihai Eminescu, the conservative poet and opinion-maker, was ridiculing the National Liberal establishment for its close association with the Văcărești detainees, implying that theirs was a solidarity in petty crime.

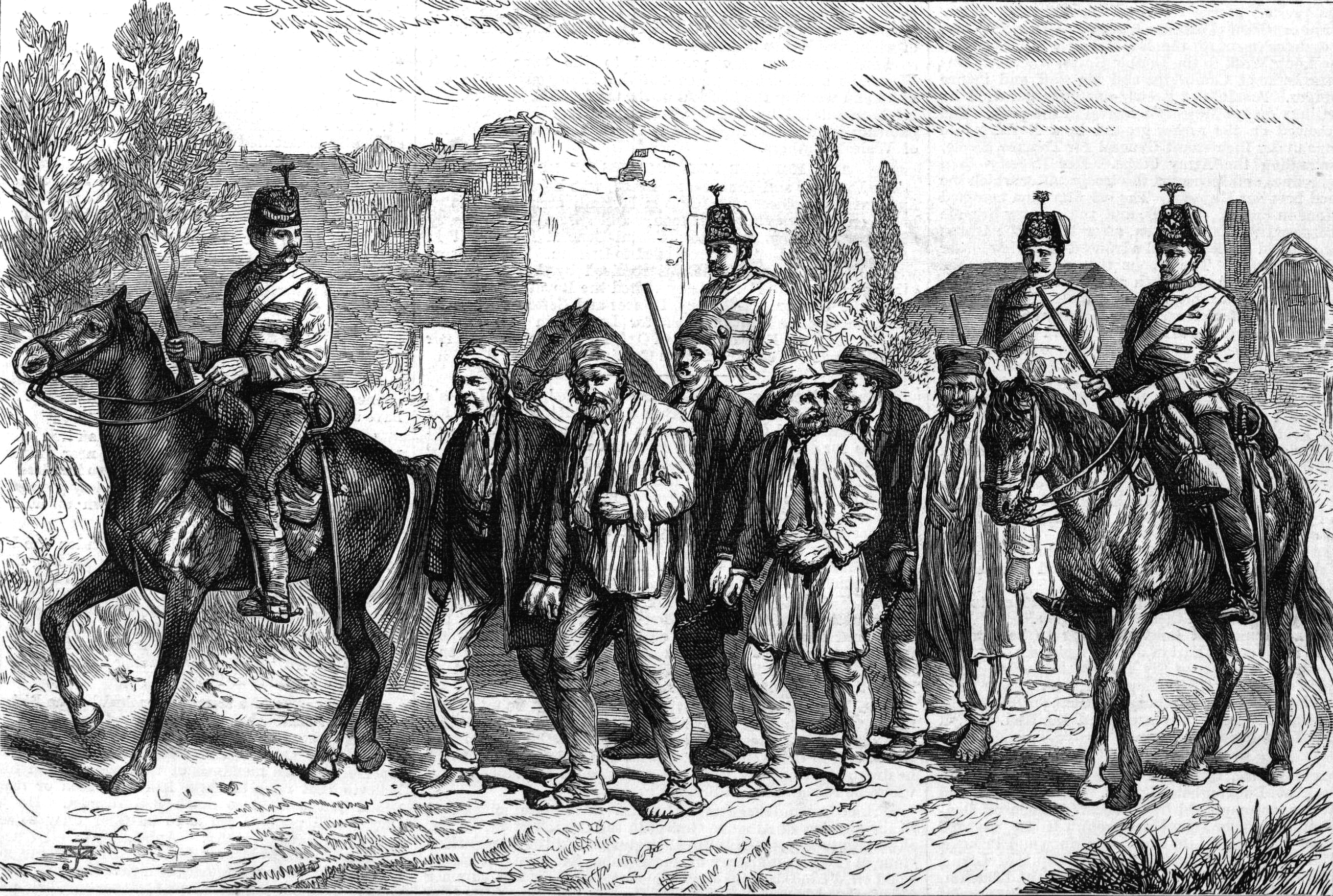
Spies being escorted to Văcărești during the Russo-Turkish War of 1877–1878

Romania won her independence from the Ottoman Empire by parttaking in the Russo-Turkish War of 1877–1878. The Russian Army was briefly stationed in Bucharest and, as a result, "a few camp spies and camp thieves" were apprehended, then sent to Văcărești. The prison was more fully used and modernized by the Kingdom of Romania, proclaimed in 1881. By 1888, it was used for detaining some 50 men tried for their role in that year's peasant uprisings, including Gheorghe Militaru, father of the poet Vasile Militaru. In their letter to Carol (now the King of Romania), these prisoners complained of having been mistreated by the Romanian Land Forces. Several other political figures and journalists were held or triaged in that complex, but for non-political crimes. A founding figure of the local Freemasonry, Constantin Moroiu, was detained at Văcărești in 1889, on suspicion that he was a counterfeiter of stamps. He was acquitted and released, but not before attempting suicide. Moses Schwartzfeld, who put out the Jewish magazine Egalitatea and was increasingly critical of antisemitism, was held at Văcărești in 1897, while awaiting prosecution for calumny.

In early 1898, the peasant leader Constantin Dobrescu-Argeș was detained there after being prosecuted for embezzlement. His arrest drew attention because Dobrescu threatened to kill himself when asked to submit to biometrics, causing the prison staff to allow an exception. He shared the space with the Conservative Party's Nicolae Filipescu, indicted for having killed Emanoil Lahovary in a duel. The two men became best friends, despite the ideological divide separating them. Convicted in 1900, Dobrescu returned to Văcărești for the final months of his sentence in 1903. Văcărești was also used for clamping down on the Social Democratic Workers' Party, with some of its activists, including Marin Bunescu, were held in confinement there for several months in 1898. They were not charged with political crimes, but rather depicted as con artists who had sold propaganda brochures at inflated prices. Around that time, after the death of an imprisoned counterfeiter known as Andronic, left-wing newspapers began circulating allegations that the prison staff was torturing the inmates. Though the claims were not proven in court, the state prosecutor, Stelian Popescu, was forced into resigning.

=== Reform attempts and 1907 roundup ===
The prison administration, meanwhile, showcased its reformist agenda with a number of public gestures. In 1896, Văcărești was the first and only Romanian prison to have a its own permanent government inspector. In October 1899, it hosted an exhibit of handicrafts and art by convicts of various facilities; it was attended by the former inmate Fleva, who was serving as the titular minister of agriculture, and who offered encouragement to the program. In 1898, a section for mentally ill prisoners had been opened, followed by a dental office. According to a 1907 reportage by the pseudonymous "Fulmen", the hospital facilities were being abused by the inmates, many of whom pretended to deranged in hopes of obtaining sympathy. Undercover journalist P. Macri, who spent three days of 1905 observing the prisoners, reported that the women did laundry for their male colleagues, and that new mothers were allowed to nurse their children on the premises. Macri's account also includes ethnographic detail, suggesting that prison folklore spread awe and panic about the existence of a "Văcărești ghost", roaming the corridors at night.

The wardens introduced an education program, and in May 1907 authorized Deacon Gibescu to lecture on morality—the first such event to be hosted at Văcărești. Writer Ioachim Botez, who spent those years working as a guard and educator, later confessed that Văcărești's school was a deception meant to attract funds, with all but one of the enlisted students being made to do menial work for the warden. During Fulmen's visit later in 1907, the bored inmates could be seen playing passe-dix, defying a nominal ban on gambling. By then, male short-term prisoners were being used as builders and brick-makers on the Obregia psychiatric hospital that was being erected south of the prison complex; recidivists were instead employed on various on-site workshops, including a bindery funded by Crown Prince Carol. There was also a wickerwork facility, managed in late 1908 by the Bulgarian counterfeiter Zhivko Traykov.

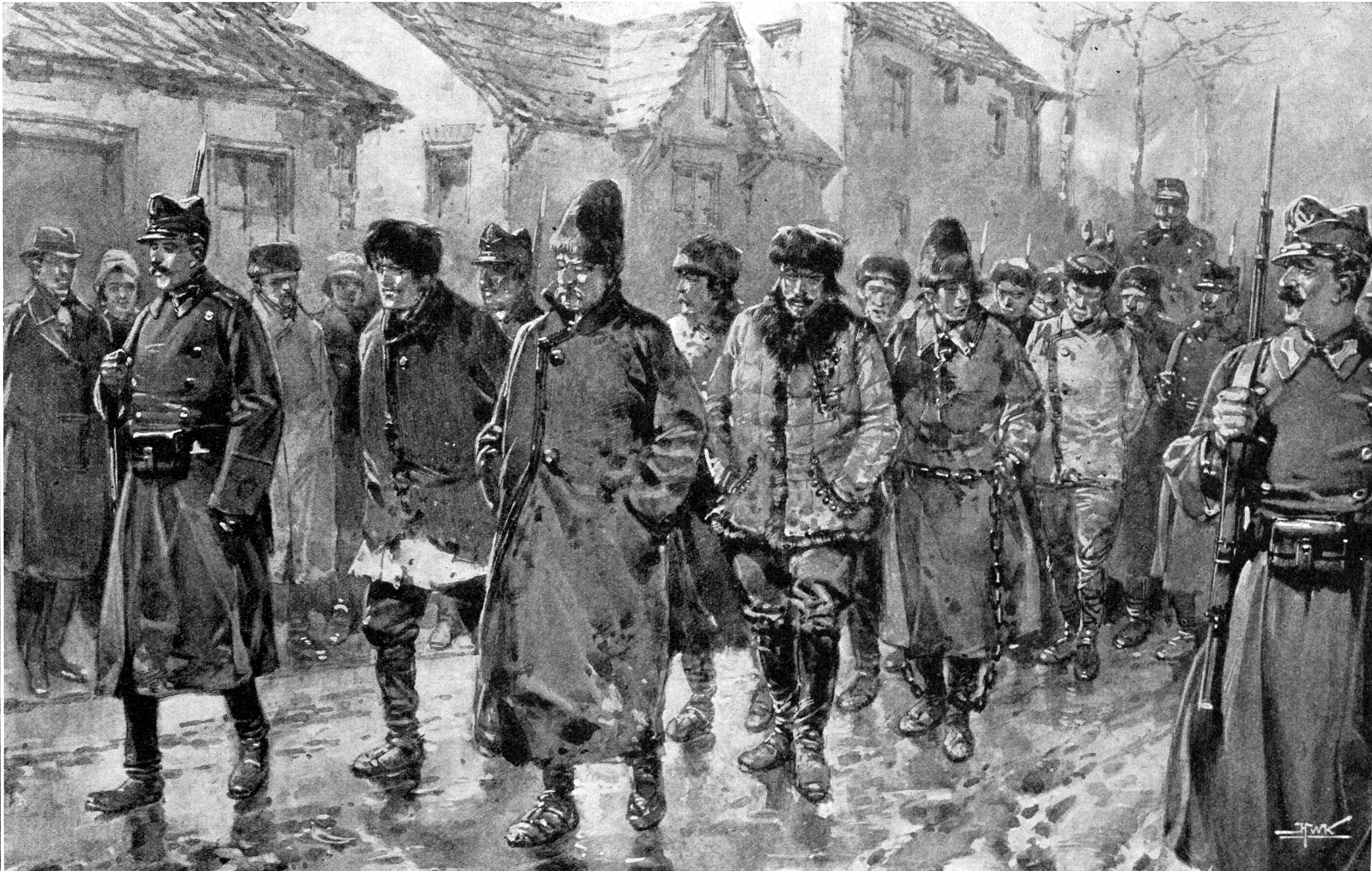
A prisoners' convoy after the Romanian peasants' revolt (drawing by Hermanus Willem Koekkoek, The Illustrated London News, April 1907)

Repression against radicals and socialists was enhanced after the peasants' revolt of March 1907. Fearing a peasants' march on Bucharest, the authorities garrisoned a large military force in the surrounding neighborhood, visible especially around areas of Jewish concentration. The prison itself was reportedly congested by rebels arrested in Western Moldavia. The Ministry of Internal Affairs issued specific orders targeting nomadic Romanies, suspected of having engaged in looting wherever public order had broken down. As a result, 20 Romanies from Ilfov were apprehended and taken to Văcărești. In August, eight rebellious workers carried out their 10-day sentences at Văcărești (which they reportedly left in high spirits, raising doubts about government's ability to intimidate them); their leader, I. C. Frimu, was held for an additional five days. They were fed with packages brought in by Frimu's wife Rozalia, with funds provided by the socialist doyen Constantin Dobrogeanu Gherea.

The Văcărești institution was being criticized by Fulmen as inadequate, especially due to sanitation concerns and the prevailing "thick odor" that came with archaic plumbing. It also continued to be scrutinized for its system of pre-trial detention. In April 1908, former inmate Enry Gherghely recounted that some of those he met there had spent as many as four years without being heard by a judge. The allegation was regarded as misleading by the Ilfov prosecutor's office. In mid-1910, the authorities in charge of Văcărești were dragged into an international controversy centered on the young novelist Liviu Rebreanu. The latter, a Romanian nationalist from Austria-Hungary, had crossed the border illegally into Romania, and was held in the prison before being extradited to Gyula. In his notes of the time, Rebreanu reports being asked by fellow inmates to write their correspondence; he also notes that the food at Văcărești was bad when compared to that distributed in Austro-Hungarian prisons, but also that the portions were much larger.

An attempted riot was reportedly stifled by the guards in August 1911. At around the same time, state officials were humiliated by a string of highway robberies which occurred just outside the prison walls. Eyewitnesses indicated the suspects as nomadic Romanies, leading to the arrest and prosecution of an entire tribe. In October 1911, the authorities were again greatly embarrassed by the escape of two Văcărești detainees, Vasile Slavu and Vasile Sfetescu. The latter, who was on his first offense, managed to elude recapture and apparently lived the rest of his life as an outlaw. Another incident occurred in October 1912, when Stoyan Dimitrov, serving time for his assassination of Ștefan Mihăileanu, escaped from the compound. Dressed as a motorist, he spent several days at large until being apprehended in Frătești, on his way to Bulgaria.

=== World War I and aftermath ===
During the political intrigues that preceded World War I, aviator Rodrig Goliescu was tried and sentenced for high treason; detained for a while at Văcărești, he was dispatched to Ocnele Mari in July 1913. Văcărești was also central to some of the events of the war as experienced in Romania. When Romania entered the war on the side of the Entente Powers in late 1916, there was a roundup of suspected foreign agents. The prison hosted the German clerk Erna Hasselbach, mistaking her for her mother Adela. The latter worked as a maid for General Constantin Prezan, and had been identified as a likely spy and arsonist; in the resulting confusion, she disappeared from the country. Romania also moved to repress various groups of anti-war socialists—while their leader Christian Rakovsky was under house arrest, regular militants were dispatched to Văcărești. A late-1916 invasion by the Central Powers resulted in the fall of Bucharest, upon which such political prisoners were set free by the Imperial German Army. The prison library was reportedly ransacked during the debacle.

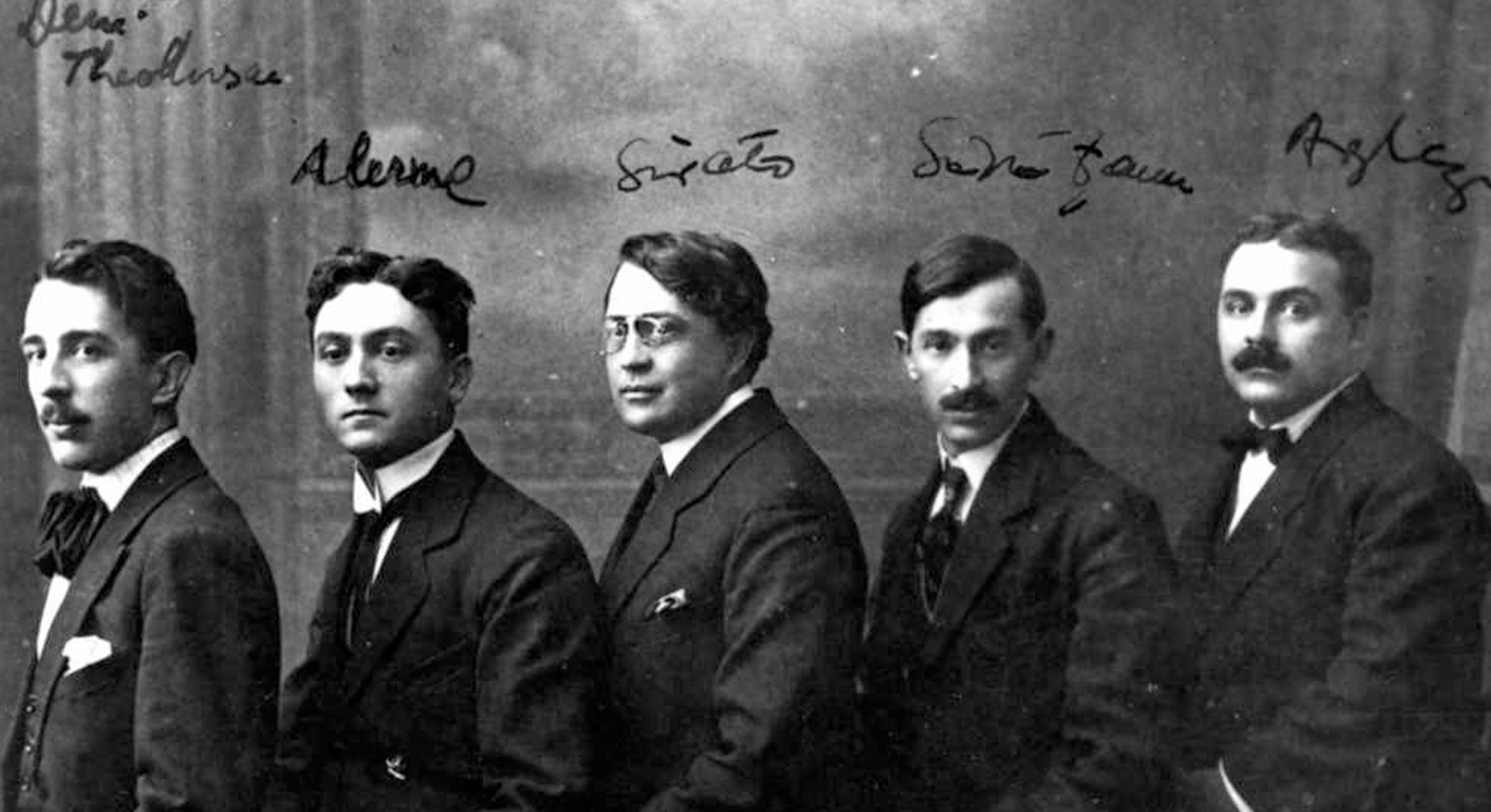
The staff of Cronica magazine in 1916, with future inmates Dem. Theodorescu (first from the left) and Tudor Arghezi (last)

For the following two years, southern Romania was under a German military administration, which had its own stand-off with the radicalized socialists. In May 1918, Romania capitulated and agreed to cede territory to the neighboring Central Powers. The socialists rebelled against this state of affairs with a hectographed manifesto. It was intercepted by the Germans, who punished the authors with a two-months incarceration at Văcărești; they included Ecaterina Arbore, Alecu Constantinescu, Gheorghe Cristescu, Constantin Titel Petrescu, Ilie Moscovici, Constantin Popovici, and six others. By then, the German high command had managed to obtain collaboration from various political and cultural figures, collectively known as the "Germanophiles". In late 1918, Romania could resume war against the Central Powers, and the Ententist establishment took back control of the government. In the aftermath, those "Germanophile" journalists who were singled out as especially treasonous were dispatched for trial at Văcărești—the group included Tudor Arghezi, Saniel Grossmann, A. de Herz, Dumitru Karnabatt, Ioan Slavici, and Dem. Theodorescu. Slavici was transported there exactly on his 71st birthday, and, according to his own recollections, was publicly spat upon by the Ententist Nicolae Iorga.

At Văcărești, the "Germanophiles" crossed paths with members of the Socialist Party, rounded up for their role in the labor strike of December 1918. Slavici, demoralized by the prison conditions (which he viewed as akin to Dante's Inferno), was pleasantly impressed by the socialists he met, including the re-offender Frimu, noting their resilience in front of scarring police brutality. Frimu's subsequent death in custody was observed by Herz, who reported that the deceased had been "mercilessly beaten" by the guards, who thus pushed his typhus into a terminal phase. The "Germanophile" group itself lacked solidarity, with Arghezi leaving notes that, as noted by literary scholar Pompiliu Marcea, appeared to disparage Slavici. The latter was also annoyed by Arghezi's continuous focus on tidiness.

The "Germanophile" society was soon after joined by Alexandru Bogdan-Pitești (though he had shared the group's political agenda, he was serving time for his earlier engagement in blackmail). Herz was acquitted, while the other five co-defendants were sentenced to five years each. They continued to reside in Văcărești, where the conditions improved greatly—largely because of a humanitarian press campaign carried out by Arghezi's friend, Gala Galaction. They were all pardoned by King Ferdinand I in December 1919. For a while, the authorities focused their attention on other "Germanophiles". One of them was Constantin Stere, who surrendered himself in May 1919 and was subsequently transported to Văcărești—an outcome that was widely seen as caused by his enmity toward the Ententist politico Vintilă Brătianu. The arrest resulted in a public furor, and Stere was transferred to a regular hospital after a very short period (according to Arghezi, he "was at Văcărești for one and a half days"). He was reunited there with another nominal Văcărești inmate, Lupu Kostaki, who had served as the German-appointed governor in Bucharest. The two men, alongside all the other "Germanophile" detainees, were spared prosecution and released in June 1919.

This period was enshrined in Romanian literature by both Slavici (who, for a while after his release, could only bring himself to write memoirs of his time there) and Arghezi. The latter opted to live just outside the prison walls at Mărțișor, where he intended to establish a "citadel of writers". The plan largely failed, but he was joined by more commoners, and helped them by introducing electricity and running water to their Dealul Piscului homes. Despite such initiatives, Arghezi viewed the facility itself as a place of perdition. This image was initially outlined in a 1930 quasi-novel, Poarta neagră ("Black Gate"). It is remembered, and often reviled, for its naturalistic scenes of prison life, which include allegations that the guards tortured and quietly killed off proletarian inmates (while the upper-class ones enjoyed a string of privileges) as well as observations on other, anonymized, prisoners, detailing their hygiene and sexual habits. In one such fragment, he observes a Romani youth, who is both physically attractive and an outstanding violinist, and who engages in penetrative sex with other homosexual inmates. Arghezi revisited the prison setting in his critically acclaimed volume of poetry, Flori de mucigai ("Mildew Flowers"), part of which depicts Văcărești as a modern-day version of Goya's Caprichos.

== Interwar and World War II ==
=== 1920s ===
During the interwar period, the prison population was largely split between common criminals and political prisoners: press offenders and national security threats, especially members of the banned Romanian Communist Party. Such political prisoners could receive visitors weekly and were allowed to work on roads, sewers and in the prison workshops. One of the first self-declared communists was Max Goldstein, who had joined Rakovsky as a participant in the October Revolution, and had fought to extend Bolshevik influence in Romania. Sentenced to 10 years in prison by a Romanian tribunal as a threat to national security, he was held at Văcărești alongside Bogdan-Pitești, who informed on him to the authorities. Goldstein managed to break out of prison just shortly after, and in 1920 established an underground communist cell alongside Leon Lichtblau; together, they engaged in the first two acts of terrorism on Romanian soil: a bomb attack on the Simplon Train (stationed outside Chitila), followed by a more successful detonation within the Senate.

The first groups of communist inmates included Cristescu and Moscovici, alongside Alexandru Dobrogeanu-Gherea, Mihail Cruceanu, and Elek Köblös, all of whom had been arrested during the party's founding congress in May 1921. The prison was used as a center for holding other delegates, as well as two communists who had been apprehended while escaping in other circumstances—Pavel Tcacenco and Solomon Scheiu; members of this subgroup reportedly joined in singing The Internationale in Văcărești's courtyard, and did not back down when threatened at gunpoint. Also joining them were Moscu (Gheorghe) Cohn-Stoica, Mihail Macavei, and Gheorghe Niculescu-Mizil; in July 1921, under Cruceanu's supervision, some of them acted in a political revue staged in the prison yard—as possibly the first example of "proletarian theater" in Romanian cultural history.

The remaining defendants, who complained about having been threatened and tortured by their captors, went on hunger strike. They were ultimately transferred to special barracks in January 1922, and indicted in the so-called "Dealul Spirii Trial". The committee to assist these detainees was formed in December 1921 by Ana Pauker, who was herself a Văcărești detainee in December 1923 (and passed through the prison again in mid-1937). Her husband Marcel Pauker had also been detained at Văcărești in January 1924—reportedly, without a warrant for his arrest. He received public attention by initiating another hunger strike, which left him in serious condition. In that context, the regime also clamped down on the trade unions formed by state employees, and, in April 1923, resorted to cordoning off Văcărești to prevent unionized clerks from reaching their imprisoned leaders. In August 1925, the left-wingers at Facla newspaper, who regarded Văcărești as a tool of repression by "Romania's bourgeoisie", suggested that its then-warden, Mihail, was using illegal methods against communist inmates such as Margareta Arvole. The latter, a citizen of Fiume convicted for spying, was allegedly being pressured into becoming Mihail's informant, and, because she refused, was constantly threatened with beatings. Another round-up of far-leftists occurred on King Ferdinand's death in July 1927. Twelve women communists were separated from their male comrades (who were held at Jilava), and released after a week-long confinement in Văcărești. In May 1929, communist activist Boris Stefanov, having gone on hunger strike, was being moved between Văcărești and Brașov.

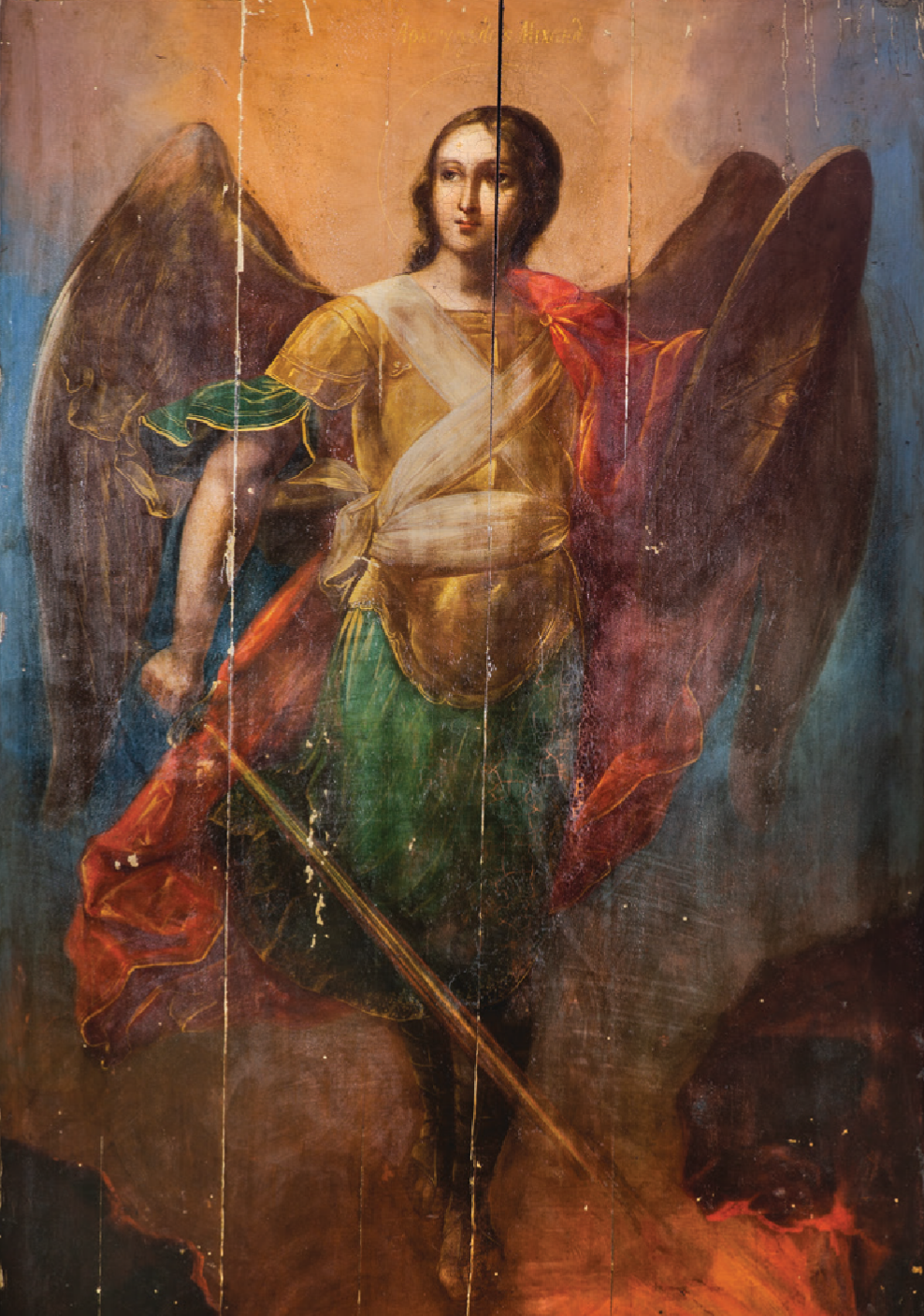
Văcărești icon of the Archangel Michael, revered by the Iron Guard

Another category of political prisoners was made up of revolutionary nationalists such as Corneliu Zelea Codreanu, who would later constitute the fascist Iron Guard. The group also comprised Ilie Gârneață, Radu Mironovici, Leonida Bandac, Traian Breazu, and Tudose Popescu. These men were detained in October 1923, after plotting to assassinate what they described as "treasonous politicians and plutocratic Jews"; Ion Moța also joined the lot for having shot down Aurel Vernichescu, whom Codreanu had denounced as a traitor to the cause. During this affair, Moța's father, Ioan Moța, moved to Bucharest and published there newspaper Libertatea, discarding from a platform of mainstream nationalism for ideas on the far-right fringes, that closely matched those of Codreanu and Moța Jr. While in custody at Văcărești, Codreanu formed the elite group of the future Guard, naming it the "Cross Brotherhoods". Though it ended in acquittal, the Guardists' presence at Văcărești became a topic of commemorative propaganda, and an icon of the Archangel Michael, contemplated by the group during their visits to the monastery, became an important symbol for the movement. The imprisonment only served to cement their cult status among the nationalist youth.

Allegations of corruption and abuse by the prison staff were routinely brought up during the late 1920s. Shoemaker Vasile Dodan, who served a three-year term (1925–1928) for the dissemination of communist manifestos, recounted that, while at Văcărești, he had been beaten up by the guards and made to sleep on the floor, describing the food he received as "some kind of a black soup". In March 1927, a public protest was issued on behalf of the Jewish student Isac Lespezeanu, who had been held at Văcărești, without trial, after having defended himself against far-right assailants. In parallel, the prosecutor's office began looking into white-collar crimes attributed to the wardens and staff. An examining magistrate carried out an investigation in 1926, and announced that he would prosecute warden Coroiu, accused of having pocketed money set aside for fabricating the prisoners' footwear. In November 1927, a former warden, Mihail Stănescu, was arrested on suspicion of fraud. He was unusually detained inside Văcărești, before being moved to Jilava. Shortly after, the authorities began investigating the former registrar, Gheorghe Borca, who had reportedly formed a criminal syndicate, with former inmates as his recruits.

=== Early 1930s ===
Though the facility was considered best suited for no more than 400 inmates, the population regularly exceeded 800, and peaked at 1,003 in 1930—it was only then that the facility was connected to the electric grid and a sewage system was added. The latter was however incomplete, since it fed into a marshland with no additional drainage. The civilian population was left uninformed of this danger, and, in winter, the feces-tainted ice was collected and sold for public consumption. In 1931, the prison had two floors with eighteen cells each. The country's first specialized guards unit began work at Văcărești in 1928. By 1930, there was a full-fledged hospital for infectious diseases, including a tuberculosis ward and two operating rooms. The library had been refitted, and was functioning alongside a school that catered to both underage inmates and illiterate youths, also providing general lectures in social hygiene. From 1919, reform and education efforts were being steered by a council of five academics, presided upon by philosopher Constantin Rădulescu-Motru. In 1927, some prisoners appeared as extras in the film version of Năpasta, directed by Eftimie Vasilescu.

The communists as a whole were again targeted in August 1931, after the authorities learned of connections established between party activist Ștefan Foriș and the Soviet Union. Foriș himself was sent to Văcărești ahead of his trial and, by his own account, used the opportunity to network with other party members, whom he educated politically, and to chair an inmates' "action committee". In 1931–1932, the prison had also held communist militant Belu Zilber. Chained alongside the would-be kidnappers of Soviet turncoat Georges Agabekov (including Alexandre Lecocq) and later alongside the serial killer known as "Mucegai", he left details on his witnessing of homosexual acts and of a former Gendarme, sentenced for having accidentally killed a thief, being psychologically tortured by his new colleagues. Zilber provides the following description:

Just like non-imprisoned Romanians wishing to travel from Timișoara to Iași would need to pass through Gara de Nord, the thieves would pass through Văcărești. In modern Romania, the capital has carried, still does carry, the attraction of a magnet. Almost anyone out in the sticks back in the day had for an ideal that they would reach Bucharest, or Văcărești—some with interventions on their behalf, others with money, others even with just cause. Life out there in the provinces is just not the same as life in Bucharest! Văcărești had its permanent fair, its free supply, a rich stream on information, lawyers well positioned in their business, a hospital, a church, not to mention boys who would turn tricks just outside the church. Văcărești was also a place to settle old scores, a clearing bank, and a research facility for future robberies. [It] was pretty much the Las Vegas of thieves.

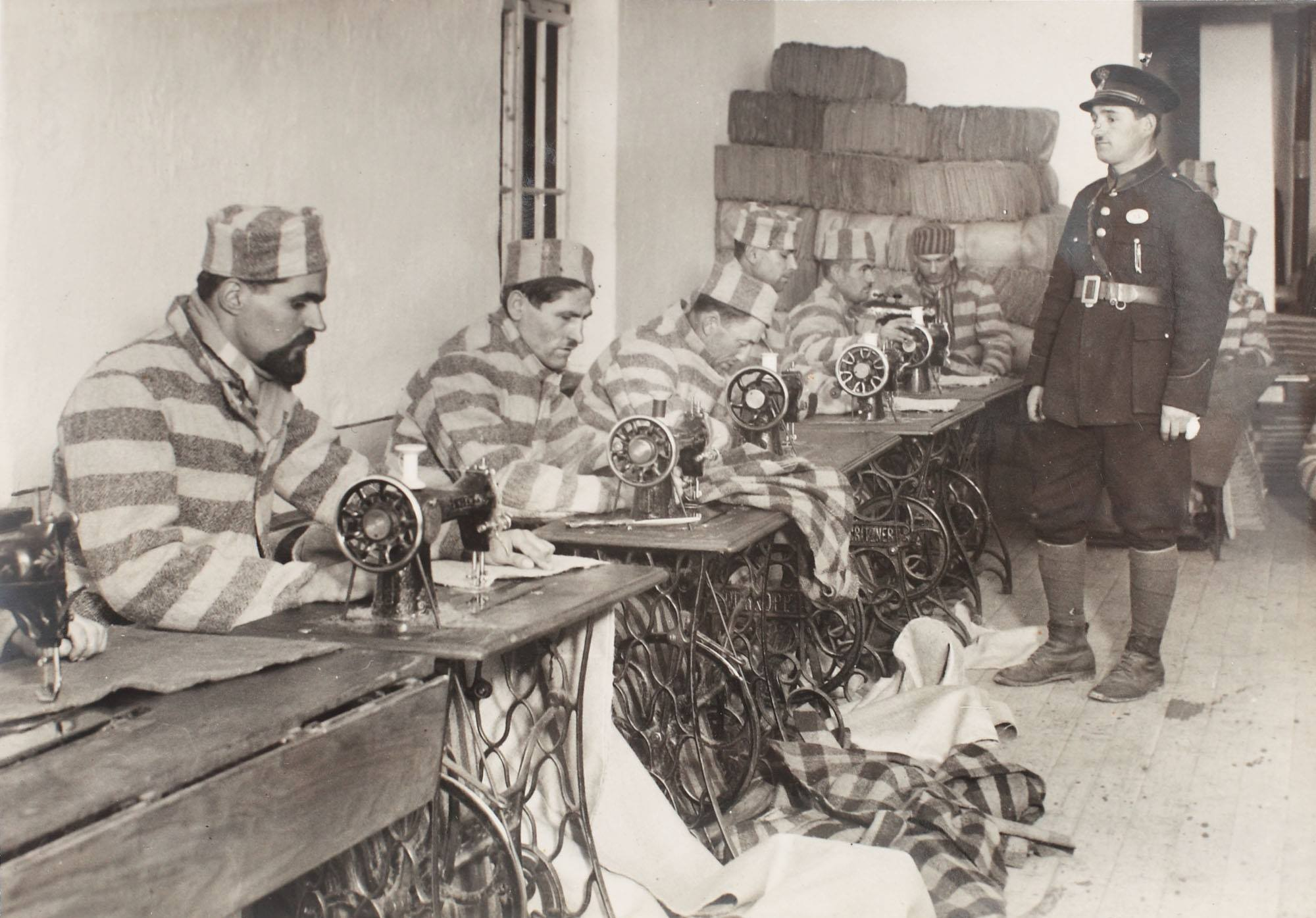
Detainees at Văcărești in the 1930s, working as tailors in one of the prison shops (photograph by Iosif Berman)

Several unobtrusive political categories were detained in the prison, including some who were Jewish. One report from 1932 describes the fate of a Hasidic man who was brought to Văcărești after having refused to pledge his allegiance to the Romanian king. He troubled the other inmates by shouting out his desperation, upon discovering that the prison officials had ignored Jewish dietary law. For ten days in 1930, Văcărești hosted a group of avant-garde authors who had published the magazine Alge (censured by the literary establishment as criminally obscene). The prosecuted youths were Aurel Baranga, Gherasim Luca, Sesto Pals, Paul Păun, and Jules Perahim, alongside their printer Bercovici. Similar charges were brought up against an older novelist, H. Bonciu, who was also briefly held at Văcărești. Indicted after a press-related crime, Mircea Damian described his experience, in naturalistic detail, with the 1932 novel Celula nr. 13 ("No 13 Cell"). Văcărești continued to hold the criminally insane in close proximity to other inmates. In September 1932, six mental patients managed to escape, but five of them were caught as they reached nearby Dudești; the sixth man was a convicted murderer, Vasile Tcaciuc, who remained at large.

The decade saw new arrests among the Communist-Party activists, with several future communist leaders incarcerated at Văcărești, especially after the Grivița strike of 1933. Examples include future communist secretary Béla Breiner and his successor Gheorghe Gheorghiu-Dej, both of whom profited from being held in the same location to inaugurate a new communist network of inmates. Other figures were involved in this effort, among them Alexandru Drăghici, Alexandru Bârlădeanu, and Chivu Stoica. Foriș, who returned to Văcărești from his regular imprisonment at Doftana, reports that he used the occasion to expose another inmate, Richard Wurmbrand, as a spy for the authorities. He returned again, for medical treatment, in December 1934, on condition that he would refrain from spreading communist propaganda. In 1935, the prison was the birthplace of future diplomat Mircea Răceanu, whose mother was the imprisoned communist Ilonka Papp.

=== Attempted closure ===
Journalist Mihai Tican, who visited in 1932, observed that, albeit overcrowded, Văcărești was more hygienic and more humane than other facilities. He reported that, thanks to a program instituted by warden Gorescu, each prisoner had a daily allowance set at 4 lei. This could be used to buy nutritious items, including rye bread; budgetary constraints prevented the administration from providing clean uniforms, but the guards tacitly allowed the inmates to dress in their civilian clothes. In June 1933, Minister of Justice Mihai Popovici promised that he would donate the buildings to the Bucharest City Hall and move its population to a "model prison", which he intended to build at another location beyond city limits. In May 1934, several members of the Bucharest Orthodox Eparchy, assisted by heiress Elena Văcărescu, openly demanded that the monastery be fully returned to the church. Some conservation work was carried out in 1936–1937, delaying decay at the monastery church. A typhus outbreak in 1936 was easily stifled, with only minimal deaths. The prison continued to function even as the Mavrocordatos-era complex was decaying, drawing calls for a restoration of the original artworks. By 1935, Văcărești had a ceramics factory, which allowed both prisoners and guards to explore their artistic skills.

January 1933 witnessed the arrest of a fascist teacher, Grigore Forțu, who was being investigated for the crime of lèse-majesté against the new king, Carol II. The authorities had to deal with manifestations of public support for the detainee, including from those who did not share his agenda, and threats that the prison would be stormed by crowds of protesters. A new batch of Guardist prisoners arrived—including, in January 1934, Codreanu's underage brother, Decebal. Though these new arrivals complained of mistreatment and beatings, they also managed to print ten issues of their own semi-clandestine newspaper, titled Văcărești-Legionar. Having managed to escape imprisonment as a "pornographer" during the Alge scandal, poet Geo Bogza was picked up in 1934, and sentenced to a three-year prison term. He spent these at Văcărești, describing his life there in reportage pieces for Vremea newspaper. Around then, Văcărești accommodated Costică Georgescu-Cantalup, a con artist who had managed to defraud the National Bank of Romania, and who claimed to have state protection.

In June 1936, after a deadly accident at the national-day feast, the prison accommodated several Bucharest City Hall employees, indicted on charges of negligence; they served alongside engineer Liviu Ciulley, accused of having murdered actress Tita Cristescu. In that context, the facility also witnessed Bogza's second prosecution as a "pornographer". He only spent six days in confinement (alongside a serial killer, Berilă), before being pardoned by Carol II. People involved with Codreanu's movement were meanwhile being subjected to mass arrests, and their conflicts with other political movements, including the communists, came to be reflected in prison life. A group of communist sympathizers alleged in early 1937 that Gheorghiu-Dej, who had again passed through Văcărești, was "cruelly maimed" there by Codreanu's supporters, including common criminals. Also then, Văcărești was housing members of the Iron Guard death squad that had assassinated dissident Mihai Stelescu. As reported by the political diarist Constantin Argetoianu, truckloads of Guardists would pay Sunday visits to these men, whom they regarded as heroes, and once tried to storm into the prison to free them; they were only chased out by the Gendarmerie. Also that year, burglars Iancu Broitmann and Ichil Schwartz managed to trick a Văcărești guard and flee from custody. They made their way into Hungary, where Schwartz was captured and extradited back. Broitmann still evaded capture until a chance arrest in 1939, upon which he was reunited with Schwartz in Văcărești.

Văcărești's groups of political prisoners continued to include people on the left, in particular female communists. One of these was Donca Simo, who died in the prison hospital, in June 1937, from a medical condition that had not been treated while she was being held at Dumbrăveni. One case that drew attention was that of Rozalia Kovaci, who went on hunger strike in May 1937 because of what she viewed as unjustified delays in her indictment; afflicted with several diseases, she also claimed that the prison doctors were ignoring her condition and would not allow her to seek specialized treatment. During her time there, Kovaci became disillusioned with communism, believing that fellow inmates Ronea Gheorghe and Suzana Bereș, the self-appointed leaders of the female section, were both using her politically and preventing her from accessing aid packages. Though sentenced to a two-year prison term, she was paroled in March 1939, and received medical attention at civilian hospitals.

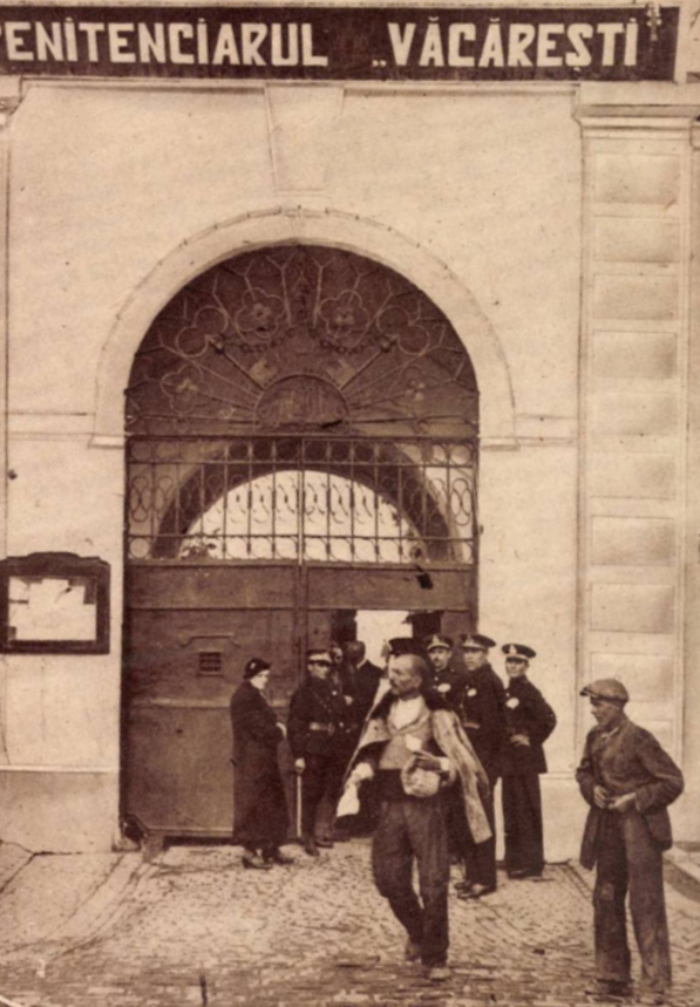
The prison gate c. June 1940

In the late 1930s, the facility became a training ground for other prison guards, including those who formed the garrison at Aiud. In 1938, when Romania was under the authoritarian National Renaissance Front, the focus of improving outcomes in prisons was maintained. Around then, Donar Munteanu, who had emerged as director-general of the prisons, co-opted warden L. Giurelly into launching a public charity for the reformed inmates of Văcărești. In July 1939, a government plan was drafted to demolish the cell blocs and maintain Văcărești church as a historical monument. This project was also shelved, and the building continued to be used and populated with inmates during the early stages of World War II. In late 1939, it held Max Auschnitt, a Jewish former iron magnate who was being tried for white-collar crimes, as well as, initially, for endangering Romania's arms industry.

=== Iron Guard takeover and downfall ===
Shortly after the Auschnitt affair, Văcărești also accommodated a group of "millionaire" street beggars, led by Tănase Burdujanu, whom the authorities regarded as confidence tricksters and malingerers. A scandal followed the escape of a group led by Florică Florescu in early 1940. In the aftermath, Justice Minister Istrate Micescu showed up at Văcărești to personally enforce discipline. Micescu's visit resulted in the selection of career criminals such as Schwartz, Vladimir Brandabura, and Sami Șaraga, who were dispatched to the more isolated Doftana. Around the same time, a young burglar named Marin Sevancea learned to abuse the system that allowed some of the prisoners to walk around the premises, and managed to escape through the prison gate.

From September 1940, the country was led by Ion Antonescu, initially in partnership with the Iron Guard—the "National Legionary State". As one of his first measures, Antonescu went on an unannounced tour of Văcărești, demanding emphasis on rehabilitation programs and expressing indignation that some inmates had been awaiting trial for more than a year. The prison and church were affected by the November 1940 earthquake, when one of the steeples caved in. On 11 December, the prison witnessed a riot attempt: several inmates barricaded themselves in the disused belfry, encouraging others to seize the guards; most prisoners refused to follow their lead, "giving proof of their reasonableness." In the aftermath, the Guardist regime promised a set of reforms, including regular health inspections and the separation of female inmates from the general population, as well as efforts to eliminate "preferential treatment" still afforded to paying prisoners.

The Iron Guard was chased out by Antonescu during a civil war in January 1941, which also doubled as a pogrom in Văcărești and Dudești, where Jewish homes and shops were ransacked by the Guardists. However, the consolidated dictatorship preserved Romania's alliance with the Axis powers, and eventually went to war on the Eastern Front. As early as February, Antonescu informed his subordinates that he intended to refashion Văcărești into an all-Jewish quarter, as a step toward complete racial segregation, followed by mass expulsions. By then, an entire section of the prison had been opened up for those whom the regime labeled as "saboteurs of commerce", beginning with Edgar Löbel. The latter filed a complaint, noting that his sentencing required him to be sent to an internment camp, but the judges reviewing his case ruled that Văcărești had been redesigned to match camp standards. Inmates of that designated area reportedly included a local butcher, who had been stolen lard from the Bucharest Abattoir, intending to use it for domestic soapmaking.

In some cases, the Antonescu regime approved of Jewish demands for justice: in March 1941, it arrested the former Guardist Aurelian Totoescu, who was being investigated for the murder of a Jewish teenager, Lucian Rosen. Dispatched to Văcărești, Totoescu attempted to provide evidence incriminating his subordinates for that crime. Father Vasile Boldeanu, who had been the Guardist commandant of Muntenia while serving as a parish priest, was also indicted for his role in the violence. He escaped Văcărești and managed to reach Germany, where he was detained with other Guardist exiles at Buchenwald. The Văcărești facilities continued to house women prisoners such as Cristina Stanceff, who died there in early 1942—while awaiting extradition and execution in Bulgaria for the murder of her lover. Arrested by the Antonescu regime, Mircea Damian had his second stint at Văcărești, describing his return there in the 1945 book called Rogojina ("The Mattress").

=== Petrescu era ===
A number of inmates were communist typesetters, including Teohari Georgescu. They were represented in court by Petre Pandrea, who also obtained that the prison accommodate its own printing press, where the prisoners could continue working, allowing them to pour some funds into the anti-fascist underground. Here, Pandrea, assisted by Constantin Ion Parhon and V. V. Stanciu, put out an academic journal, Revista Română de Criminologie, as well as various brochures on legal topics. Yves Cohen Franck, a Swiss journalist who had been imprisoned since 1941 as an alleged spy for British intelligence, claims that the attending physician Nicolae Romanescu and the prison cook Gogu Zăhărescu had remade Văcărești into a "citadel of the Iron Guard", stealing food and resources from anti-fascist prisoners. He believes that this state of affairs, coupled with generalized indifference, caused an average of five deaths a day in the winter of 1942–1943—as well as generalized famine and an outbreak of pellagra. Franck also recalled networking with a communist figure, Iosif Chișinevschi, who had been sent there for a medical operation, and who at the time was "an excellent comrade" (but whom he later grew to despise for his dictatorial inclinations). In late July 1943, Văcărești also held the communist militant Nicolae Ceaușescu. Processed while on transit to Târgu Jiu internment camp, he was allegedly held in the same cell as Franck.

Beginning in early 1942, General Alexandru Petrescu was serving as head of the prison's directorate within the Ministry of Justice. Under his watch, the main prisons, including Văcărești, became his personal sources of income and entertainment. Reports presented to Antonescu suggests that Petrescu inaugurated a new hospital at Văcărești to please his son, who studied medicine and experimented on the prisoners. The same facility was allegedly used by Petrescu himself as a "bordello", where he had sex with female inmates or with visitors, and that he used male prisoners as laborers for his home projects. As early as April 1943, Antonescian authorities approached Văcărești's communist detainees with an offer to change their status by having them drafted into the Land Forces and sent to the front. As their supervisor on the outside, Ștefan Foriș had instructed them not to reject this, but they all nonetheless did. By October, the Văcărești group was ignoring Foriș's claim to leadership, and moving closer to the comrades that were held at Caransebeș Prison, including Gheorghiu-Dej—who would topple Foriș in early 1944.

During Allied carpet-bombing in April 1944, Văcărești neighborhood was heavily affected, after high winds diverted the bombs from their intended military targets. An eyewitness to these events, Arghezi recalled that 60 prisoners were killed from a single stray bomb; he also noted that this happened while a Catholic bishop was visiting as a missionary priest, in what Arghezi regarded as proof of the monsignor's commendable courage. His son Baruțu similarly reported seeing "the greatest carnage" inside the prison yard, were the bombs had left "tens of bodies torn apart by shrapnel, waiting for undertakers who were overwhelmed by their fateful job". A more reserved estimate, recorded by diarist Emil Dorian, has 64 fatalities, "virtually all of them women". Within communist circles, the perception was that Petrescu had made a point of not evacuating the prisons, since he intended to have political prisoners other than Guardists exterminated; according to the same reports, Petrescu routinely beat up communist detainees. Some of the surviving inmates were used as bomb squads, helping to dispose of unexploded ordnance at various locations in Bucharest.

In July 1944, Antonescu ordered an inquiry into General Petrescu's management, discovered proof of embezzlement, and had him sent to the front. Antonescu himself was toppled by an an anti-fascist coup on 23 August, opening the country to a Soviet occupation, and allowing communists to emerge from the underground. The newly organized Patriotic Combat Formations reportedly entered Văcărești on 24 August, setting free a number of political detainees. By late October, the prison was taking in Antonescian loyalists, beginning with Radu Lecca. One newspaper reports had it that he was welcomed with a "dressing-down" by the other inmates, and was only rescued from bodily harm by the warden.

The legalized communist press now published reflections on Văcărești as a place of political repression. In December 1944, former inmate R. Teodor described being "provoked and terrorized" there by "the servants of tyranny". In November, the complex had been inspected by minister Nicolae Penescu, who professed his indignation that the cells lacked heating and bedding, ordering the guards themselves to be investigated. According to Arghezi, Penescu only agreed to visit after a protest involving most or all of the 800 inmates. Penescu's colleague at the justice ministry, the communist Lucrețiu Pătrășcanu, also inspected the compound during that same interval, observing its sanitary problems and ordering that two ailing women, in critical condition, be moved to a regular hospital.

== Stalinist era ==
=== Communist takeover ===
By early 1945, areas of Bucharest, including some located outside the prison, were witnessing armed robberies by Red Army personnel, some of whom were deferred to Soviet military authorities. Journalist Henry Burileanu visited the supposedly reformed establishment in September 1945, with former communist inmates as his guides. He noted the continued presence of saboteurs alongside "imbecilic" recidivists such as the Romani thief known as "Buffa"; Burileanu observed that the prison had been emptied of women from the political categories, leaving the other female inmates nostalgic for their educated presence. The same month, a school for the inmates' moral and professional education was established within the compound, later reporting that none of the female prisoners had ever re-offended.

Burileanu also reported seeing new detainees awaiting trial for their role under fascism: the Guardist author Radu Gyr, the military commander Nicolae Ghineraru, as well as a group of alleged perpetrators of The Holocaust in Ukraine. Gyr, who was awaiting trial and transfer to other prisons, was allowed to write poetry by the Văcărești staff, which only verified if the resulting texts matched the pro-democracy agenda of that period. The works were in fact early records of his suffering in confinement, and could be circulated outside the prison walls once Gyr had slipped them to his family during visiting hours. According to Burileanu, the prison was overall liberal:

The freely-moving inhabitants of this citadel go about their business: they wash, they sweep, they dust their mattresses, they sunbathe half-nude, they converse with each other, they listen in as one of the more talented inmates tells them jokes, they quarrel with each other.

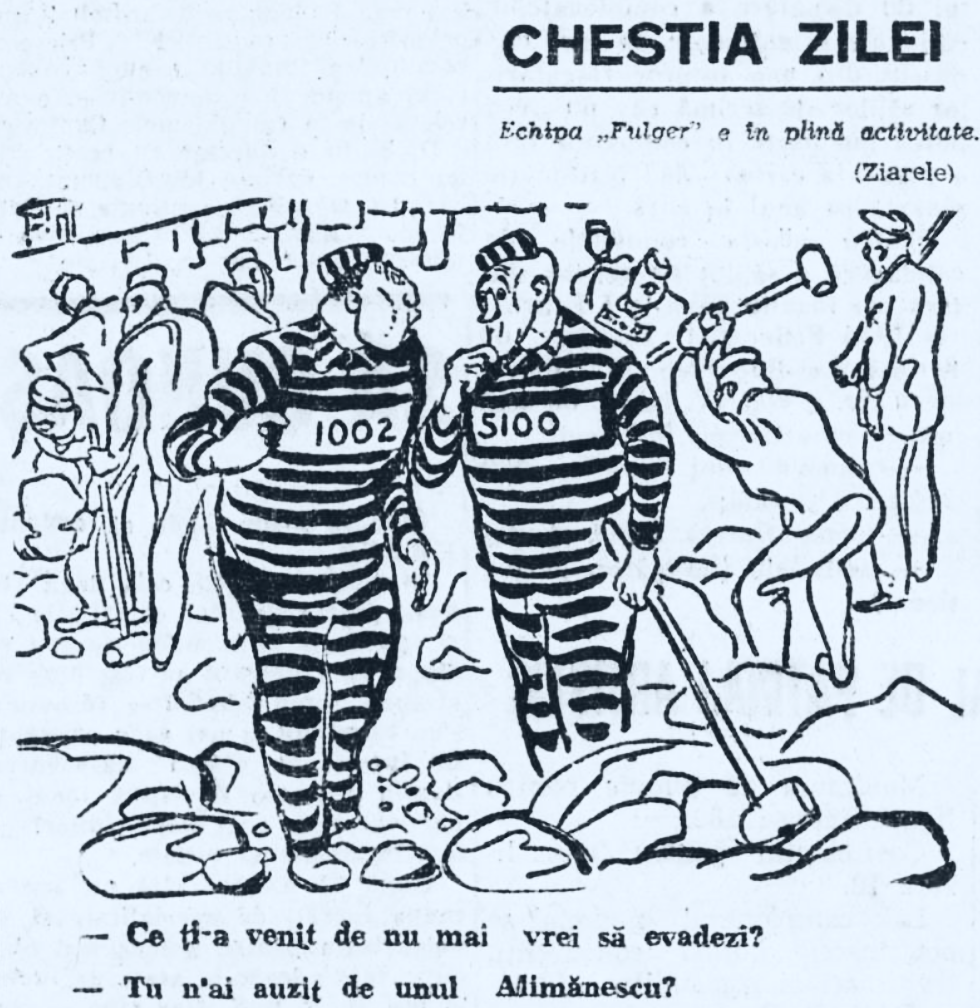
Communist cartoon of January 1946, showing a dialogue between convicts, scared into compliance by rumors of Eugen Alimănescu's swift justice

The Romanian Kingdom's last right-wing Prime Minister, Nicolae Rădescu, had been deposed in March 1945. The creation of a communist-led government brought former Văcărești inmates Gheorghiu-Dej and Georgescu into mainstream political life. Georgescu was minister of internal affairs, in which capacity he surrounded himself with other men he had met in that prison and various other facilities, including some who had been imprisoned for burglary. A wave of retaliatory arrests followed this takeover. Victims included Adriana Georgescu, who had served as Rădescu's secretary, and who was dispatched to Văcărești. During the early phases of political transition, the prison was mentioned in a highly popular diss song, Ecaterino!, which curses the female antagonist to do time în colivie la Văcărești ("in the birdhouse of Văcărești").

Romania pursued war against Nazi Germany as a Soviet ally, with troops led into battle by General Nicolae Șova. The latter had served under Antonescu, and the communists intervened to obtain his demotion and arrest; in February 1946, he was one of detainees at Văcărești. For a while after her return from Soviet captivity in April 1946, Antonescu's widow Maria was also imprisoned there. In tandem, government boasted its capacity of stamping out regular crime, advertising Eugen Alimănescu, a newly promoted commander of the Romanian Police, as a paragon of efficiency. Alimănescu's career was intimately tied to the prison: his first major accomplishment was in late 1945, when he tracked down and killed Gheorghe "Șchiopul", who had broken out of Văcărești by hijacking a tram. A testimony provided by his subordinate Gheorghe Cristescu accuses Alimănescu of having obtained such results through illegal means, including by having offenders taken out of Văcărești and having them killed.

During the "Tămădău Affair", which saw a round-up and mass indictment of the opposition National Peasants' Party, Văcărești was used to host Mihail Țanțu and Romulus Lustig, two airmen who had supposedly assisted the group in contacting the Western Allies, and who appeared as witnesses for the prosecution. At that stage, several non-communists still believed that the justice system had remained independent. In mid-1947, Major Gheorghe Arsenescu, convicted of economic sabotage, surrendered himself directly to the officials at Văcărești. His subsequent humiliation at their hands motivated him to establish a branch of the anti-communist maquis in his native Muscel.

Within the Orthodox Church, some priests expressed hopes that the regime would use Văcărești to punish corruption, especially that surrounding Constantin Burducea, the disgraced minister of religious affairs. As recorded by oral historian Dudu Velicu, this wish was communicated as a euphemism: the priests wanted Burducea to be transferred "to the 'parish' that sits opposite Mandravela [tavern]." Instead, in 1947 the communist authorities stepped in to punish the politically dissident clergy. In early 1947, they deposed Irineu Mihălcescu, the Metropolitan of Moldavia, and rounded up all Moldavian parish priests who had sided with Mihălcescu. Eleven of these were sent to Văcărești. At around that time, the prison was visited by Vasile Aftenie, an auxiliary bishop of the repressed Greek Catholic Church, who openly defied the authorities with this gesture.

=== 1948–1951 stagnation ===
From Teohari Georgescu's ascendancy, through to the establishment of a socialist republic in 1948, and until the prison's closure in 1973, Văcărești was a transit prison for both common criminals and political detainees. The regimen afforded by the prisons worsened steadily during the early stages of communism. Those tried alongside Antonescu spent time at Văcărești, as did Mircea Vulcănescu and a host of other figures, many of them in administrative detention or with expired sentences. The unlawful nature of such acts was discussed by Petre Pandrea, who was himself arrested by the new regime and sent to Văcărești for interrogation in 1948. While held there alongside economist Titus Cristureanu, he noted that the Securitate was building up a prosecution case from their written statements, with no other evidence present in the records. He reported that the regimen bordered on starvation (only mended by common-law prisoners, who recognized and fed their former lawyer), and that the political prisoners, still in their civilian clothes, were held in such close proximity that they urinated on each other. Antonescu's Minister of Propaganda, Nichifor Crainic, surrendered himself to the authorities in May 1947, and was consequently dispatched to Văcărești. Still detained there in September of that year, he wrote a letter to the acting Premier, Petru Groza, noting:

I entertain no illusions, since, as in any political trial, mine will not even review my merits when it comes to Romanian culture—merits that were being recognized just a while ago by the country as a whole—, but rather a few phrases of mine, subject to an arbitrary interpretation.

In early 1949, the prison held a number of people investigated for political offenses or war crimes in the former Bessarabia Governorate, alongside Antonescian officials processed by the Romanian People's Tribunals. A survivor of this group was the priest Vasile Țepordei, who left memoirs of his captivity. He reported that his colleagues included Atta Constantinescu, Iosif Iacobici, and Ion Petrovici, noting that they were being intentionally starved by their captors. Also then, Văcărești shared with Jilava the role of holding large groups of former Iron Guard members, in preparation for their mass trial. As observed by the new Securitate agency, these detainees were self-segregating from the mass of prisoners and encouraged each other to engage in acts of anti-communist defiance, to unprecedented levels—including by maintaining links with Guardist cells in Western Europe, which were preparing for a guerrilla war in Romania. Held separately at Văcărești, the alleged perpetrators of the Iași pogrom reportedly blamed the Jews for the state's unwillingness to have their cases processed; they also collectively recanted their statements, indicating that they had been beaten into confessing, and staged a protest demanding better food and more physical activity. In 1951, the authorities arrested Arsenescu's wife Maria, who was held at Văcărești before being sent on to Târgșor for her 10-years sentence.

For a while, Văcărești was still supervised by the old-regime warden V. Policală, who was briefly deposed and detained on suspicion that he was indoctrinating inmates into the Guardist ideology; the denunciation turned out to be false, and he was reinstated. Later, the institution came under the former upholsterer Marin "Tunsu" Constantinescu, whose brutality was unusually evident after 1953, when he had been promoted to general director of prisons. In some instances, the prisoners were successfully questioning their wardens' competence: in January 1948, a ring of "traders sentenced for sabotage" escaped by forging discharge certificates. The Jewish convert and Lutheran pastor, Richard Wurmbrand, was sent to Văcărești infirmary after three years of solitary confinement. He reports being told that he was sent there to prevent his death, and also that he was discretely assisted on arrival by one Securitate man, who was secretly a devout Protestant. Wurmbrand was also treated alongside the Guard's Radu Mironovici, who was thus returning to the prison. They had disputes about antisemitism and Christ's Jewishness.

The public maintained a belief that Văcărești was a bearable prison. In 1950, the guards at the more infamous Jilava reportedly warned their prisoners that "this is not Văcărești, so don't be expecting smiles and trays of food." Also then, diarist Pericle Martinescu heard women workers at Dacia Spinning Mill complaining that they had been locked into their workplace, which they described as being "worse than Văcărești". As he turned against Teohari Georgescu and consolidated his own control over government structures, Gheorghiu-Dej came across the violent re-education experiment carried out by the Securitate inside Pitești Prison, and decided to end it. Some of those responsible were prosecuted, including the Pitești warden Alexandru Dumitrescu. It is not known what became of him, but some Văcărești inmates swore that saw him incarcerated in one of the cells. They concluded that Dumitrescu was scapegoated, and probably killed off, by his former colleagues. Re-education survivors held at Văcărești included in 1950 Radu Ciuceanu, a former member of the anti-communist resistance. He noted that the atmosphere was generally humane, but also that the guards were sometimes violent and generally callous (with new arrivals being strip-searched in freezing temperatures), and that a spoils system was run by the common criminals (known as "penguins" in the prison cant). He reports being told to guard himself from sadists, including those with life sentences, who were alleged to have raped and occasionally murdered some of the non-violent offenders.

=== "The republic's grandest jail" ===
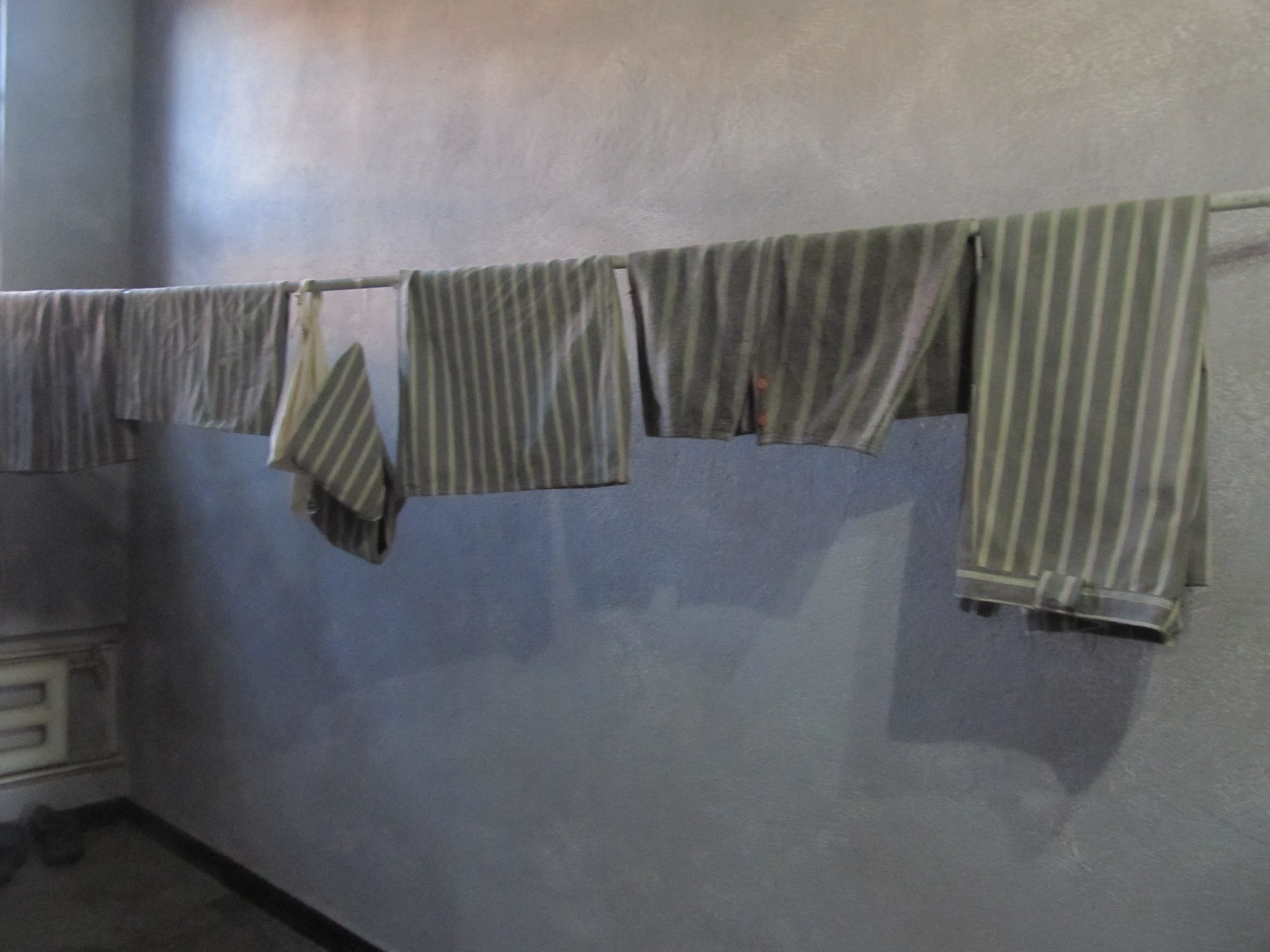
Prison uniforms as worn by political prisoners at the height of communism (Sighet Prison museum)

Over time, positive accounts came to be contrasted by other data, which indicate that the prison population was overall facing dire conditions. With the arrival of full-on communism, prisoners were no longer allowed correspondence, food packages or visits. Allegations surfaced that, by 1951, the regime was sending to Văcărești all groups of civilians who had committed minor or non-prosecutable offenses, including Sima Herșcovici, a Jewish employee in the SovRom system, who had failed to complete his work quotas. Herșcovici and other inmates were pushed by warden Popa into the "black hole"—a windowless cell that was partly flooded. According to this account, at least one prisoner was permanently disabled as a result. In 1951–1952, the prison's regular staff included Grigore Pintea, transferred from Sighet, where he had been recognized as polite and protective toward the detainees. Pandrea returned to the prison compound around that time, his health having been compromised in other, more dangerous, facilities. Recovering at the prison hospital from viral hepatitis and dacryocystitis, he credited his survival to the prison warden, Bodnărescu. The latter had been a Văcărești inmate during the typesetters' roundup, and Pandrea had represented him in court.

Initially, the long stream of prisoners forced the regime to open up Jilava as a secondary transit prison, but the latter reverted to its original role during the first months of 1952. New areas of the former princely church were opened up as dormitories—including Mavrocordatos' former cellar, which, as Ciuceanu recalls, came to be covered in a "thick mud, of the kind that is specific to Văcărești." Degradation was accelerated, with archeologist and inmate Vladimir Dumitrescu recalling that the church seemed beyond repair. By late 1953, the overcrowded Văcărești held between 2,800 and 3,000 people, with 100 to 300 per cell. At this stage, the magistrate and writer Traian Ulea was held there for almost three years (1952–1955), due to a clerical error. The prisoners themselves estimated the total population at 5,000 or even 6,000, with almost 300 sub-officers as guards; the latter reportedly boasted that they ran "the republic's grandest jail". One statistical analysis suggests that the population once peaked at 4,665 detainees.

In 1952–1953, prison food consisted mainly of gruel, made from rough barley, which only the most starved-out prisoners could ingest. Văcărești was just one of three hospitals within the prison system. There were 560 patients in 1956, assisted by fourteen male nurses with minimal training and occasionally visited by doctors who did little more than hand out pills. In many cases, the elderly patients suffered from incurable diseases and were confined to a hospital bed until they died. Wurmbrand recalls being told that some of Văcărești's "official doctors" had been caught "smuggl[ing] in drugs and earned themselves ten years in jail." Ciuceanu additionally argues that "people die[d] in Văcărești as well, when syringes and their content got mixed up". According to his recollections, Vintilă Weiss, a former Securitate officer turned Văcărești prisoner, boasted that he had denounced "doctors whom he saw favoring some of the bandits."

People who died in communist custody at Văcărești include Vasile Aftenie, brought to the prison hospital in May 1950, after beatings and mutilation by Securitate personnel, and Eugen Cristescu, former head of the Siguranța police—whose date of death was officially recorded as 12 June 1950. George Grigorovici, who had led a section of the Romanian Social Democrats into cooperation with the National Renaissance Front, also spent his final days at the penitentiary, in July 1950. He is sometimes listed among Rudolf Brandsch, a former leader of the Transylvanian Saxons, who similarly died at Văcărești in September 1953; both he and Grigorovici had been instrumental in creating the Greater Romanian state during the interwar. Another Social Democrat and 1918 unionist, Iosif Jumanca, was reportedly killed through torture in Gherla Prison, but had his body moved to Văcărești in order to conceal the evidence. Sociologist Anton Golopenția died in Văcărești hospital in September 1951; his jailers admitted in official reports that he had not received treatment for his tuberculosis. Four Land Forces generals also died at Văcărești in that context: Radu Korne (1949), Nicolae Ciupercă and Grigore Cornicioiu (both in 1952), and Vasile Măinescu (1953).

In early 1952, Ruxandra, daughter of Ioana Hudiță-Berindei, was born behind the prison walls. As her father Dan Berindei reports in his memoirs, at least one member of the staff risked his own liberty to make sure that the family was kept informed of this. Another female detainee, Ileana Samoilă, gave birth at Văcărești during the harsh winter of 1953–1954. She notes that she was given supplements and vitamins, that the room she shared with others was heated, and that a sympathetic militiawoman helped deliver, and secretly blessed, her baby. Several others were born at Văcărești in the 1950s. They were held with their mothers for several months, then assigned to their fathers or relatives, or, in some cases, sent to orphanages without the family's consent.

== Final decade ==
=== De-Stalinization ===
In the early 1950s, Văcărești's history became intertwined with the struggles for power, opposing Gheorghiu-Dej and the Caransebeș faction to Georgescu and Ana Pauker. Initially, the former camp, which emerged as victorious, described itself as orthodox Stalinist, depicting Pauker as a right-wing deviationist. As noted by Țepordei, the country regarded Dej as the better option, trusting that he would be more humane, but, in practice, the changes were overall cosmetic. Dej held on to power after Stalin's death, and proceeded to depict his conflict with Pauker as an aspect of de-Stalinization in Romania. As part of this reshuffle, party cadres were encouraged to vent their anger at the Paukerites. One of those assisting Dej was Gheorghe Stoica—who backdated the clashes to 1921, when the communists held at Văcărești felt "indignation and bitterness" upon hearing that Ana and Marcel Pauker were attempting to gain control of the surviving apparatus.

The scale of repression and inner-party struggles had become known to outsiders by 1953, when political jokes began circulating about Văcărești being an obligatory stop on the planned Bucharest Metro, with trains leading directly there from the Central Committee. New arrests of this wave included communist writer Ion Nicola, detained at Văcărești for having collected state funds for a massive historical novel, which was found to be entirely plagiarized from classical authors. Dej's men also arrested the Securitate's Ioan Popa, who had led an infamous labor camp at Salcia. Popa was however only convicted for economic crimes, and as such demanded that he be moved from the "political" Jilava to the "labor penitentiary" at Văcărești. Such prisoners crossed paths with their victims. Also in 1953, anti-communist Sergiu Popescu was injured by an explosion while doing penal labor on the Danube–Black Sea Canal. He was brought to Văcărești hospital for emergency eye surgery, but told that he would only get it if he agreed to inform on his mates for the Securitate; by his own account, Popescu preferred to go permanently blind.

The prison's deputy warden was Nicolae Moromete, or "Maromet", who was widely feared as a habitual torturer; he either preceded or succeeded a man simply known as Tessler, who is alleged to have verified the inmates' capacity for work by personally hitting them with a bat. However, conditions were again allowed to improve. As Wurmbrand argues, by the time when Gheorghiu-Dej had emerged as "our dictator", and had begun expressing some remorse for mass incarcerations, his wife Sabina Wurmbrand was allowed to recover in Văcărești from months of starvation. During February 1954, a single bloc held three eminences of the National Peasants' Party—Corneliu Coposu, Banu Ghica and Ionel Pop. They were detained alongside former Guardists such as the Catholic mystic Horia Cosmovici, with whom they could communicate freely. By then, Văcărești's political prisoners were again receiving bread, and were generally allowed to discuss with each other on various topics, creating a "free university"; they were also allowed to take showers, but only at night (probably because of a wish to separate them from the other categories, with whom they now had only minimal contact).

Around September 1954, a cell bloc was almost entirely cleared of prisoners, who were allowed to return to civilian life. The remaining group comprised V. Dumitrescu, who recalls being placed under an informal leader who was prosecuted as a Guardist (but was in reality a regular offender, who had been caught looting in 1941). In early 1955, after an attack on the Romanian embassy in Bern, which they attributed to the Iron Guard, the authorities decided that the Guardists would again be segregated, and then dispatched to the penal center at Aiud. Dumitrescu notes that a new hospital had been built within the complex, but that it was reserved for "common criminals, the regime's favorites." Patients with political records were crowded in the old annex, which, though better staffed and equipped than before, still witnessed the death of academician Alexandru Marcu. In that context, Dej ordered the Securitate to investigate itself, and was presented with a detailed report on the irregularities observed in various facilities. The prison authorities at Văcărești were found to have pilfered the inmates' food. Maromet was among those who lost their employment, and was later spotted working as a cinema usher.

=== Geneva Summit and general amnesty ===
During this new transition period, Văcărești was housing the entire leadership of the Zionist movement—Mișu Benvenisti, A. L. Zissu, Jean Cohen, Shlomo Sitnovitzer—and groups of other Jewish anti-communists (including Rabbi Bernard Halpert). They were mixed in with Romanian aristocrats such as Pavel Krupensky and Radu Sturdza, with National Peasantists such as Ștefan I. Nenițescu, with dissident socialists such as Adrian Dimitriu and Constantin Motaș, as well as with some of the Iron Guard remnants. In late 1955, General Constantin Constantinescu-Claps also entered Văcărești, followed shortly after by Ernest Bernea, the Guardist intellectual. Ciuceanu, who was assigned to share a cell with Benvenisti, recalls being startled these all remaining groups were clean, well fed, and attended to by a highly professional Doctor Catană—all of which indicated of an unexpected change in prison policy. Returning for treatment, Wurmbrand observed however that he hospital "was more overcrowded than ever", with patients "[having] to share rooms and exchange infections. In one instance in 1956, the entire prison corpus was screened for tuberculosis using a newly acquired X-ray machine, allowing for a rare encounter between scantly-dressed male and female detainees.

By spring 1956, the inmates had caught rumor of the Geneva Summit, which allowed Romania to join the United Nations and, as Ciuceanu believes, also prompted Dej to re-frame his relationship with the Securitate. One of the last wardens at Văcărești was Ștefan Koller, moved there in the late 1950s after having managed Aiud—where he had sparked a riot after murdering one of the inmates. At his new workplace, he was noticeably less brutal, but still used starvation to drive prisoners into compliance. As a sign of his new-found acceptance, Koller allowed Halpert to keep his beard, though he still ignored the rabbi's dietary requirements. Halpert openly prayed, including during an impromptu visit by the interior minister, Alexandru Drăghici. Drăghici winced, but allowed the ritual to continue. Briefly, the ward also housed Vasile Leu, an Orthodox priest that the regime had prosecuted for treason. Also then, the anti-communist prisoners were amused that Ana Pauker's former associate and finance minister, Vasile Luca, had been assigned a bed in Văcărești hospital. As reported by Ciuceanu, they probed him about his policies, to which Luca presented his case as an anti-Soviet, liberal socialist; none of those listening believed him. Luca was held alongside Wurmbrand, who notes that the guards also mocked the former minister. He described Luca as permanently apprehensive and troubled by existential questions, but also as adamantly atheistic.

The post-Geneva state of affairs also came with collective pardons for the Zionists, all of whom had been released and allowed to emigrate by mid-1956. Instead, as Ciuceanu recounts, Văcărești received mainly "the moribund", two of whom died "before we could even catch their names"; he and Sturdza believed that some 300 people had been interned at the ward in 1954–1956, and that eighty of them had died. Ciuceanu observed a young Catholic priest, Francisc Xavier Heider, who was slowly dying in hospital from wounds received at Rahova Prison. He was similarly present for the last days of Petre Popescu-Cetate, who had prosecuted communists in the 1936 Craiova Trial (and was being held there alongside the much younger and healthier Gili Ioanide), and witnessed the physical agony of former diplomat Victor Rădulescu-Pogoneanu. The latter had arrived there after suffering torture and physical impairment at Râmnicu Sărat, but survived in the physicians' care to 1962. Eugen Cristescu's communist successor, Lucian Stupineanu, was likewise imprisoned after claims that he was trying to defect to the west, and also died at Văcărești, in 1953. Those who died in hospital after the onset of de-Stalinization also included five other army generals: Ioan Arbore (1954), Constantin Ilasievici (1955), Ioan D. Mihăescu (1957), Radu R. Rosetti and Gheorghe Rozin (both in 1961). Two of the last political prisoners known to have died in Văcărești (both in 1960) were Ecaterina Bălăcioiu, mother of the anti-communist broadcaster Monica Lovinescu and widow of culture critic Eugen Lovinescu, and writer Ion Al. Vasilescu-Valjean, wrongfully convicted of treason.

According to Ciuceanu, around 1956 Văcărești was being converted into a transit facility for regular criminals, with "political" ones now processed almost exclusively at Jilava. From 1957, it operated a "labor colony" (or camp), located between Dragomirești-Deal and Chiajna. Around then, Dej's government punished men and women indirectly connected to Arsenescu's resistance group, imprisoning several of them, again including Arsenescu's wife, at Văcărești. One of the female inmates caught up in this affair was Elena Stanciu of Câmpulung; although released in 1962, she suffered from severe psychological trauma. Dej's entourage preserved a wholly negative view of the prison staff. In 1964, minister Drăghici angrily observed that his most incompetent and mendacious staffers were only "fit to work at Văcărești". All detainees still held on political charges were ultimately released with a general amnesty during Dej's final years. The moment as experienced by the Văcărești group is depicted in a social novel by Tudor Manta, which was written in 1971 but only published twenty years later. Women who received their amnesty while at Văcărești include a Catholic nun, Sister Clara; Lucreția Jurj, who had been involved with Leon Șușman's resistance group; Aristina Pop, who had led a resistance cell in Țibleș Mountains; and Iuliana Preduț, a supporter of Toma Arnăuțoiu's anti-communist guerrilla.

=== Evacuation and demolition ===
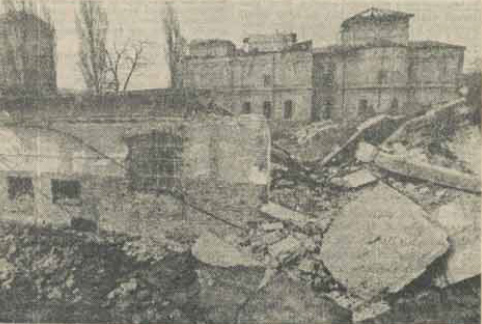
Demolition site in January 1987

In 1965, former 1940s inmate Nicolae Ceaușescu became Romania's communist leader. Văcărești endured as a place for common-law punishments, used for instance in holding Simion Floareș, who had murdered his wife in Brăila. To this last wave of convicts, Văcărești became known as "Mandravela", after the nearby pub. Repression was largely toned down, but took new forms, targeting obstinate critics. National Peasantist Octavian Oloieriu, having already spent time in prison under Dej, returned in 1970, after having sought to inform Western powers about this situation. According to his own testimony, he was arrested alongside some 500 other such dissidents, and sent to Văcărești. Here, they became victims of punitive psychiatry, being diagnosed as insane by the prison doctors, then dispersed to hospitals around the country. Văcărești was still used for a while as a facility for common criminals, but also, more covertly, for political offenses. Historian Felician Velimirovici argues that this was the case for scholar I. D. Suciu, detained there in 1973 and formally sentenced for his homosexuality under "Article 200". According to Velimirovici and to Suciu's own statements, he was in fact punished for having lost faith in Ceaușescu's policies.

Also in 1973, Ceaușescu ordered the prison to be transformed back into a cultural site, with the evacuation complete by 1974. The original designs called for Văcărești to be remade into a "museum of traditional architecture and art", but the powerful earthquake of March 1977 damaged the existing structures; these events convinced Ceaușescu that the monastery would need to be demolished altogether. Around that time, Baruțu T. Arghezi had put together a screenplay based on his father's experiences at Văcărești, and had presented it to the cultural officials, alongside a scale model of the prison, of his own design. The project was shelved after pressures to have the message politicized to match the regime's requirements, something which Arghezi rejected. The largely abandoned complex was being used as a playground by children from the new high-rise neighborhood of Berceni, some of whom also offered impromptu guided tours to other visitors. The former prison offices were briefly assigned to the National Archives of Romania, storing the Bucharest documentary fund, while book collections placed under state censorship, including once previously owned by the Lovinescus, were briefly stored in the disused kitchen. In 1979, one of the cellars was used in filming war scenes for Sergiu Nicolaescu's Ultima noapte de dragoste.

According to theories advanced by architect Gheorghe Leahu, Ceaușescu may have had one of two reasons for destroying the complex. One is that it reminded him of his own imprisonment; another is that he took revenge on the Orthodox Church, who had rejected his offer to concede ownership of its estate on Dealul Mitropoliei. Demolition ultimately took place in 1986–1987, as part of the urban systematization campaign and against protests by leading architects. Among the former inmates, Ciuceanu, who had managed to complete his training in archaeology, led a crew of local Romanies into collecting all movable items from the condemned chapel, which he loaded into carts and transported to a local museum. Only fragments survive from the old monastery, in museum collections, while some of the surrounding area is covered by the Văcărești Nature Park. During September 1996, the area witnessed a manhunt for a murderous deserter, including an incident in which a soldier was mistakenly killed by the Romanian Police. In early 2001, one of the last inmates to have served time at Văcărești was released into the general population. Pseudonymously known as "Gelu M.", he had reportedly been the victim of a judicial error.

== Notable inmates ==
This list includes inmates of Văcărești Prison who are independently notable; the symbol † indicates those who died there.

- Vasile Aftenie †
- Maria Antonescu
- Ecaterina Arbore
- Ioan Arbore †
- Tudor Arghezi
- Constantin D. Aricescu
- Gheorghe Arsenescu
- Max Auschnitt
- Aurel Baranga
- Alexandru Bârlădeanu
- Mișu Benvenisti
- Ernest Bernea
- Alexandru Bogdan-Pitești
- Geo Bogza
- H. Bonciu
- Traian Brăileanu
- Rudolf Brandsch †
- Ion Brătianu
- Béla Breiner
- Ștefan Cârjan
- Nicolae Ceaușescu
- Iosif Chișinevschi
- Radu Ciuceanu
- Nicolae Ciupercă †
- Corneliu Zelea Codreanu
- Constantin S. Constantin †
- Alecu Constantinescu
- Atta Constantinescu
- Constantin Constantinescu-Claps
- Corneliu Coposu
- Grigore Cornicioiu †
- Dumitru Coroamă
- Horia Cosmovici
- Ioan Emil Costinescu †
- Constanța Crăciun
- Nichifor Crainic
- Eugen Cristescu †
- Gheorghe Cristescu
- Vladimir Cristi †
- Mihail Cruceanu
- Alexandru Ioan Cuza
- Mircea Damian
- Adrian Dimitriu
- Constantin Dobrescu-Argeș
- Alexandru Dobrogeanu-Gherea
- Alexandru Drăghici
- Ioan Dumitrache
- Constantin Ticu Dumitrescu
- Vladimir Dumitrescu
- Nicolae Filipescu
- Nicolae Fleva
- Gheorghe Flondor
- Ștefan Foriș
- Grigore Forțu
- I. C. Frimu †
- Ilie Gârneață
- Adriana Georgescu-Cosmovici
- Teohari Georgescu
- Gheorghe Gheorghiu-Dej
- Onisifor Ghibu
- Banu Ghica
- Ion Ghica
- Nicolae Ghineraru
- Max Goldstein
- Rodrig Goliescu
- Anton Golopenția †
- George Grigorovici †
- Saniel Grossmann
- Radu Gyr
- Emil Hațieganu
- Ion Heliade Rădulescu
- A. de Herz
- Iuliu Hirțea
- Ioan Hudiță
- Iosif Iacobici
- Constantin Ilasievici †
- Ion Ioanid
- Radu Ionescu
- Iosif Jumanca
- Leon Kalustian
- Dumitru Karnabatt
- Elek Köblös
- Radu Korne †
- Lupu C. Kostaki
- Radu Lecca
- Vasile Leu
- Gherasim Luca
- Vasile Luca
- Alexandru Macedonski
- Ernest Maftei
- Gheorghe Magheru
- Vasile Măinescu †
- Alexandru Marcu †
- Nicolae Mărgineanu
- Ioan D. Mihăescu †
- Gheorghe Mihail
- Radu Mironovici
- Ilie Moscovici
- Constantin Motaș
- Ștefan I. Nenițescu
- Gheron Netta
- N. T. Orășanu
- Zenovie Pâclișanu
- Nicolae Păiș
- Sesto Pals
- Petre Pandrea
- Iustin Pârvu
- Ana Pauker
- Marcel Pauker
- Paul Păun
- Jules Perahim
- Constantin Titel Petrescu
- Dumitru Petrescu
- Ion Petrovici
- Gheorghe Pintilie
- Aristina Pop
- Ionel Pop
- Petre Popescu-Cetate
- Constantin Popovici
- N. Porsenna
- Victor Rădulescu-Pogoneanu †
- Liviu Rebreanu
- C. A. Rosetti
- Radu R. Rosetti †
- Gheorghe Rozin †
- Ioan Sârca
- Moses Schwartzfeld
- Donca Simo †
- Ioan Slavici
- Nicolae Șova
- Boris Stefanov
- Constantin Stere
- Chivu Stoica
- Gheorghe Stoica
- Lucian Stupineanu †
- Pavel Tcacenco
- Vasile Tcaciuc
- Vasile Țepordei
- Dem. Theodorescu
- Scarlat Turnavitu
- Traian Ulea
- Ion Al. Vasilescu-Valjean †
- Gheorghe Vasilichi
- Ion Vincze
- Gheorghe Vlădescu-Răcoasa
- Mircea Vulcănescu
- Vintilă Weiss
- Richard Wurmbrand
- Sabina Wurmbrand
- Belu Zilber
- A. L. Zissu
