= Magyarvalkó =

Magyarvalkó is the Hungarian name for two places in Romania:

- Văleni village, Călățele Commune, Cluj County
- Valcău de Jos Commune, Sălaj County (until 1899; subsequently called Alsóvalkó)
