= Ernest Bernea =

Romanian sociologist, ethnographer, and writer (1905–1990)

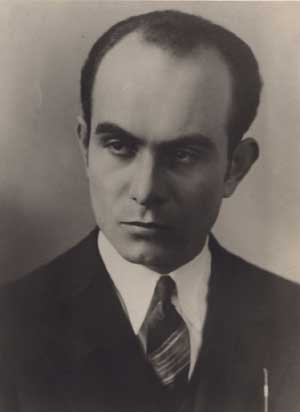
- Born: March 28, 1905; Focșani, Kingdom of Romania
- Died: November 14, 1990 (aged 85); Bucharest, Romania
- Resting place: Cernica Monastery, Ilfov County, Romania
- Education: University of Bucharest

Ernest Bernea (28 March 1905 – 14 November 1990) was a Romanian sociologist, ethnographer, photographer, philosopher, poet, and far-right ideologue.

== Early life and education ==
Ernest Bernea was born on 28 March 1905 in Focșani, Vrancea County, Romania. His father, Marcu, was a Moldavian peasant (originally from the Galați area), and his mother was from a Transylvanian family. He had five brothers.

Bernea grew up in Brăila, where he worked from an early age, due to the fact that his father was seriously ill and his older brother had been killed in World War I. He raised four younger brothers, despite himself being a "copil de trupă" ("child of the troops"), meaning that his upbringing and education was paid for by the military.

Bernea attended school at the Nicolae Bălcescu Lyceum, where he became interested in drawing and literature. He enrolled in the University of Bucharest's Faculty of Letters and Philosophy in 1926, where he studied Romanian and French literature. During this time, he made contacts with historian Nicolae Iorga, ethnographer Dimitrie Gusti, and philosopher Nae Ionescu. He graduated in 1929.

From 1930 to 1933, he studied sociology and history of religion in Paris under Marcel Mauss, and thereafter in Freiburg under Martin Heidegger.

== Career and political activity ==
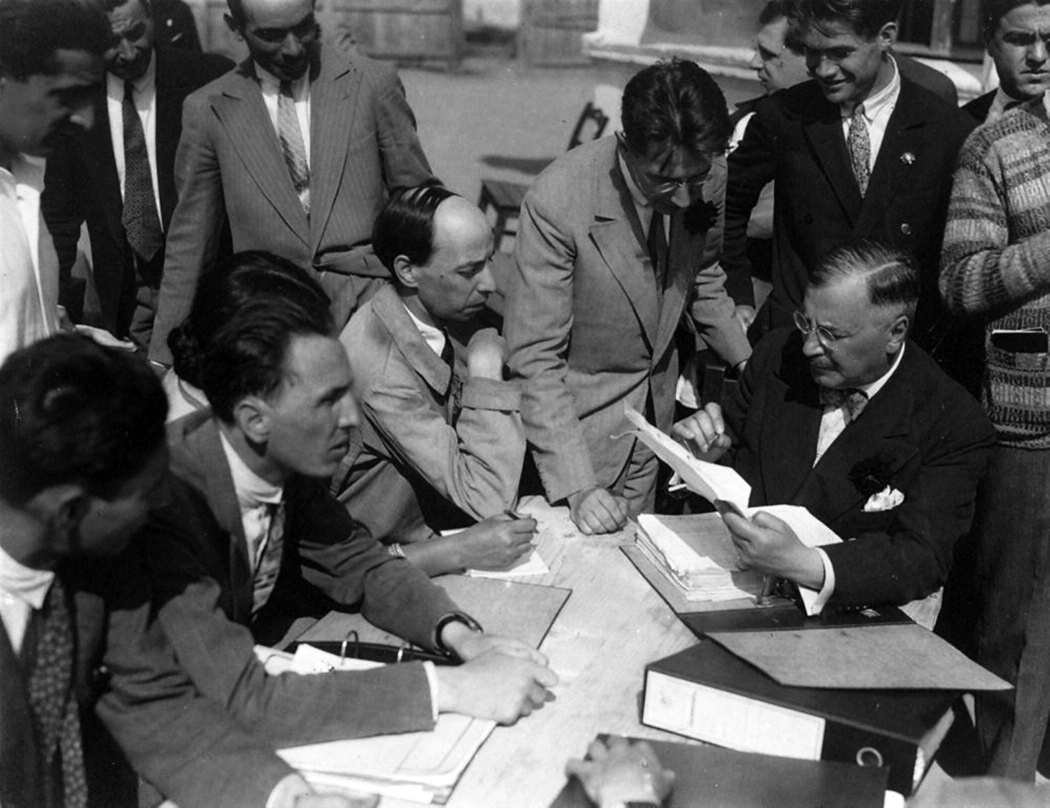
Ernest Bernea (standing, left) with colleagues Dimitrie Gusti, Traian Herseni, Constantin Brăiloiu, Henri H. Stahl working on an ethnographic monograph in Drăguș, 1929.

From 1933 to 1935, Bernea served as Secretary of the Department of Sociological Monographs at Institutul Social Român ("the Romanian Social Institute") and as a member of the Romanian sociological school under the leadership of Dimitrie Gusti.

From 1935 to 1940, he served as conferențiar (an intermediary level between a lecturer and full-time professor) of human geography at the University of Bucharest, under the leadership of Simion Mehedinți. In this period, Bernea also published several volumes of essays and poetry.

In 1935, Bernea became a member of the Legionary Movement (or Iron Guard), a nationalist, antisemitic, and far-right group active in interwar Romania. During this period, he also founded the journal Rânduiala alongside Dumitru C. Amzar, Ion Ionică, and I. Samarineanu. Rânduiala was a quarterly political-cultural journal of nationalist and Legionary leanings, and featured contributions from other far-right and Legionary writers like Radu Gyr, Lucian Blaga, and Haig Acterian. Bernea published several pieces of standalone Legionary propaganda during this period, and helped to promote and increase membership in the movement among sociologists and other academics. He considered leader Corneliu Zelea Codreanu just the newest in a long line of Romanian national leaders, like Horea, Tudor Vladimirescu, or Avram Iancu, and that the Legion was the natural outcome of Romania's history and culture and an effective vehicle for social change.

Under King Carol II, the Legionary Movement was suppressed, and Zelea Codreanu was arrested and tried in 1938, for which Bernea served as a witness. Bernea himself was arrested that year, and was imprisoned in Vaslui until the autumn of 1939. In September 1940, the Legionary Movement came to power, forming the National Legionary State; however, after the dissolution of the government due to the Legionnaire's Rebellion in January 1941, Bernea was again arrested under suspicion of participating in the coup attempt. He was released shortly thereafter.

During the communist era, between 1949 and 1955, Bernea was variously imprisoned in Vaslui, Târgu Jiu, Târgu Ocna, and Brașov, with some short periods spent outside of arrest. He was also held under "compulsory residence" in Bărăgan. In 1955, he was re-tried and sentenced to ten years of hard labour. He was imprisoned variously at Jilava, Văcărești, and Aiud prisons before being released early in 1962.

Under the recommendation of Perpesiccius, Alexandru Philippide, and Miron Nicolescu, Bernea returned to his professional activities in 1965, working for the Institute of Ethnography and Folklore in Bucharest until 1972. He also began publishing ethnographic and sociological texts, albeit in a heavily censored form. Several of his later manuscripts remain unpublished, and in 1984 he was again investigated by the Securitate, with seven of his manuscripts being seized.

According to his daughter, he never renounced his involvement in the Legionary Movement. In the post-war period, his work continued to be published by members of the Legionary Movement living in exile.

== Personal life ==
In 1932, Bernea met Maria Patrichi, a native of Galați and a fellow graduate of the University of Bucharest. They married in 1937 and had three children: Horia (b. 1938), and twins Ana and Tudora (or Teodora). Maria died of cancer around 1962, at the age of 56.

Horia Bernea became a painter and the director of the National Museum of the Romanian Peasant, whose archives hold Ernest Bernea's collection of photographs and ethnographic work. Ana emigrated to the US, and Tudora became a hydro-technical engineer.

Bernea died in Bucharest on 14 November 1990, and was buried at Cernica Monastery in nearby Pantelimon.

== Selected works ==
- Crist și condiția umană (1932, republished as Bucharest: Cartea Româneasca, 1996)
- Gând și cântec. Poesii. (Bucharest: Tip. Bucovina, 1939)
- Moldovă tristă. Poeme în proză (Bucharest: Rânduiala, 1939/1940)
- Preludii (Bucharest: Rânduiala, 1939)
- Pași în singurătate. Poeme în proză. (Bucharest: Rânduiala, 1940)
- Cartea Căpitanilor (Bucharest: Serviciul Propaganda Scrise, 1937/1940)
- Stil legionar (Bucharest: Serviciul Propaganda Legionare, 1937/1940)
- Tineretul și politică (Bucharest, 1940)
- Timpul la țăranul român: contribuție la problema timpului în religie și magie (Bucharest: Tip. “Bucovina” I.E. Torouțiu, 1940)
- Îndemn la simplitate. Mărturisiri pentru un om nou (Bucharest: Cugetarea Georgescu Delafras, 1941)
- Colina lacrâmilor (Bucharest: "Dacia Traiana", 1943)
- Civilizația română sătească. Ipoteze și precizări (Bucharest: Colecția "Țară și neam", 1944)
- Firide literare (Bucharest: Colecția "Luceafărul", 1944)
- Maramureșul. Țară românească (Bucharest: Colecția "Gând și faptă", 1944)
