= Ilie Gârneață =

Romanian lawyer and founding member of the Iron Guard

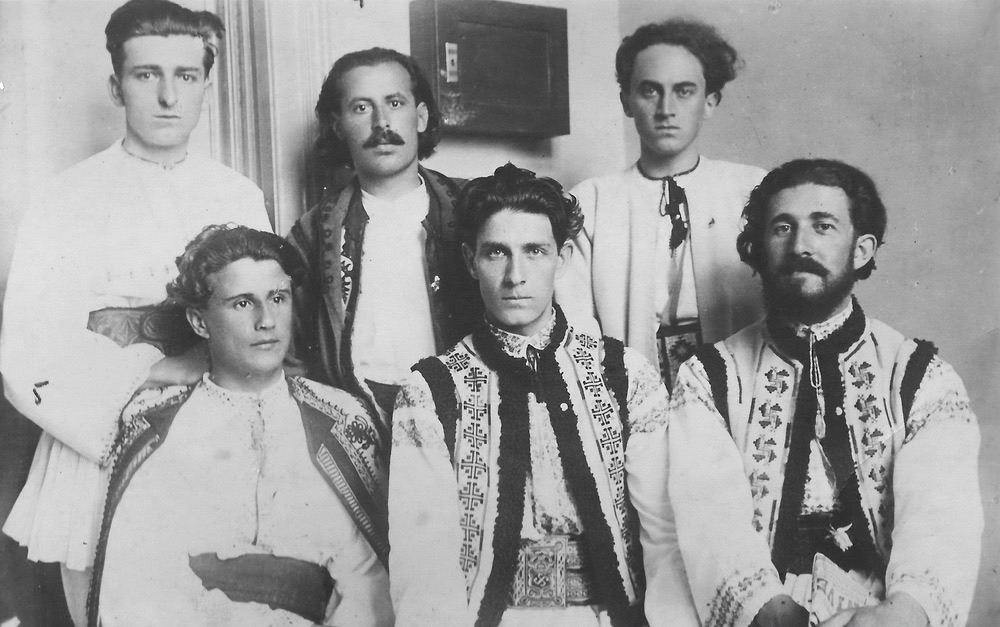
- Ilie Gârneață (bottom right) and the Văcăreșteni
- Born: 1898; Iași, Kingdom of Romania
- Died: 28 May 1971 (aged 72–73); Erding, Bavaria, West Germany
- Occupations: Lawyer, politician

Ilie Gârneață (1898 – 28 May 1971) was a lawyer and founding member of the Legionary Movement, a far-right movement in Romania.

== Biography ==
Gârneață was born in Iași, Kingdom of Romania, in 1898, to a family from Darabani, in Western Moldavia. He served as a volunteer in the World War I, during which he networked with other nationalists. First attending a military school in Botoșani, he later studied law in Iași. In 1922, Corneliu Zelea Codreanu appointed him president of the local chapter of the Association of Christian Students.

In October 1923, Gârneaţă and five others (including Corneliu Zelea Codreanu, Ion Moța, Radu Mironovici, Teodosie Popescu, and Corneliu Georgescu) were arrested in Bucharest under suspicion of attempting to spark a civil war in Romania. The group, who became known as the Văcăreșteni (named after the prison at Văcărești, where they were held), were accused of amassing arms and plotting to kill government ministers and Jewish business figures.

In 1924, he was imprisoned alongside Codreanu and 11 others for the killing of Romanian Police prefect Constantin Manciu.

== Legionary Movement ==
Gârneață was one of the founding members of the Legionary Movement (later known as the Iron Guard), and from 1936 onwards held the title of Comandant al Bunei Vestiri ("Commandant of the Annunciation"), the highest rank in the organization.

Gârneață was a frequent contributor to Pământul strămoșesc, an organ of the Legionary Movement which began publication in 1927. In 1931 he began to co-edit the antisemitic newspaper Cuvântul Iașului alongside Nelu Ionescu and Stelian Teodorescu.

Gârneață was imprisoned during King Carol II's "Royal Dictatorship", during which the Legion was severely repressed. By early 1940, Gârneață (alongside other Legionnaires such as Vasile Noveanu and Corneliu Georgescu) agreed to hold discussions with the King. After the Legionary Movement came to power in September 1940, forming the National Legionary State alongside Ion Antonescu, Gârneață was one of only two "Commandants of the Annunciation" (the other being Radu Mironovici) who did not hold office. However, he proposed and led Ajutorul Legionar ("Legionary Aid"), a mutual aid network throughout Romania aimed at serving refugees from recently ceded territories of Bessarabia, Bukovina, and Transylvania, and one of the higher-profile outlets of Legionary propaganda. Gârneață was one of several leading members opposed to Horia Sima's leadership of the Legion, forming a splinter group to challenge the latter's authority.

== Exile and death ==
Following the Legionnaire's Rebellion in January 1941, Antonescu (with the support of the German authorities in Romania) repressed the Legion. Gârneață briefly benefitted from protection by the Sicherheitsdienst outpost in Bucharest, being that the Germans considered him a "moderate" Legionnaire and willing to cooperate with the Axis. Soon thereafter, he and other leading Legionnaires fled to Germany. There he was put under surveillance alongside Horia Sima and other high-profile Legionnaires in a villa in Berkenbrück, near Berlin, and was later imprisoned in Dachau.

Following the Second World War, Legionnaires in Austria, Spain, and Italy received covert assistance from Vatican officials. Gârneață, displaced in Italy between 1945 and 1947, and living under the pseudonym "Antonio Gini" (or "Gjini"), converted to Catholicism in an attempt to gain the support of Cardinal Eugène Tisserant, who was involved in assisting Romanian refugees. However, the latter showed little interest in backing Gârneață's ambitions.

He died in Erding, West Germany on 28 May 1971 at the age of 73.
