= Ioan Sârca =

Romanian serial killer and rapist

- Born: 9 March 1911; Alsóvalkó, Austria-Hungary (present-day Valcău de Jos, Romania)
- Died: 1991 (aged 79–80); Mioveni, Romania
- Other names: "The Monster from Valcău"; Ioan Rosanu
- Conviction: Murder x20
- Penalty: Life imprisonment x2 (reduced to 15 and 25 years imprisonment, respectively)

Details
- Victims: 20+
- Span of crimes: 1943–1945
- Country: Romania
- States: Bucharest, Bihor
- Date apprehended: 1945

Ioan Sârca (9 March 1911 – 1991), known as The Monster from Valcău, was a Romanian serial killer and rapist who killed at least 20 young boys and adolescents between 1943 and 1945. Considered one of the worst killers in the country's modern history, he was sentenced to life imprisonment and died behind bars in 1991, having never expressed remorse for his crimes.

== Early life ==
Sârca was born on 9 March 1911, in Valcău de Sus, the only child in an illiterate peasant family. He lived in his native village until he was 17, when he moved to Bucharest and began working at a MALAXA manufacturing plant. In 1933, he was drafted into the army, where he served in the 2nd Gherla Mountain Howitzer Regiment and the Central Ammunition Depot until he was discharged the next year. Sârca then returned to Bucharest, where he married, had a child and began working as a locksmith. In 1935, he was jailed for 3 months for stealing tools and materials from the factory he worked at, with this conviction resulting in him being fired and his wife leaving him. After his release, Sârca was arrested for another theft from the Gas and Electricity Plant, for which he was ordered to serve another six months.

Following his release, unable to find a job, Sârca began to earn money by offering sexual services to men, while maintaining relationships exclusively with women. He continued to do this until the early 1940s, when he began to feel sexual desire towards younger men.

== Initial murders ==
In August 1943, Sârca approached a young man Gheorghe Boroș in a commune near Bucharest, claiming that he had a job offer for him. After convincing Boroș to accompany him, he lured him to a nearby cornfield where he hit him and attempted to tie his hands. Boroș resisted fiercely and managed to escape without harm, immediately reporting the incident to the gendarmerie, who were unable to catch the perpetrator.

An indeterminate amount of time later, he met a teenager named Vasile Kis, whom he also lured to the cornfield with promises that he could work on a farm. The pair ate and drank until Kis fell asleep, whereupon Sârca tied up his hands behind his back and started raping him, eventually strangling Kis. Afterwards, he gathered his valuables and later sold them at a flea market.

Over the next two years, Sârca claimed between nine and eleven further victims, utilizing the same modus operandi each time. He was recognized by several witnesses who had seen him leaving with some of the victims and eventually arrested. While awaiting trial for the murders and facing a certain sentence of life imprisonment, he was imprisoned at the Văcărești Prison.

== Escape and new murders ==
Around this time, utilizing the fact that the country was under Soviet occupation, Sârca enlisted the help of a fellow detainee to make a fake birth certificate, claiming that he was a Soviet citizen named Gheorghe Andreescu, born in 1917 in Boianu Mare, and demanded that he be repatriated. Unaware of his criminal past, the Soviet authorities allowed him to leave, with Sârca moving to Transylvania.

There, he committed a new murder in Brașov, luring 18-year-old Vasile Sorim to the peak of the Tâmpa Mountain with the promise of a job. There, he knocked Sorim to the ground, undressed and then proceeded to rape him, strangling him during intercourse after some time. He then wrapped a wire around his neck and hanged him from a nearby tree. He repeated this act with one other victim, about whom no public information is available.

By September 1945, Sârca moved to Oradea, settling in an abandoned house in Rhedaly Park. Left without any identification, he befriended a young soldier by the name of Vasile Pârvu, who, in exchange for hearty meals at the "Pisica Albastra" restaurant bought at Sârca's expenses, provided him with the proper papers under the name "Ioan Rosanu". Like his previous victims, Sârca attempted to lure Pârvu out of town, but refrained from doing so when the latter turned down his offer.

Over the next few months, Sârca would pick up victims in front of the train station, the hospital or the flea market, luring them to the Apateului forest or cornfields with promises of jobs. Once at the desired destination, he would tie them up, undress them, rape and strangle them, covering the bodies with branches and leaves. Once he was finished, he would gather their clothes and sell them at the flea market.

These victims were:

1. Mihai Juhas (16), furrier's apprentice lured to the Apateului forest after being offered animal skins from Russia
2. Florian Moric (16), lured next to the Municipal Cemetery under the pretext of being offered a job as a telegraph operator
3. Ioan Bordac (16), lured under the same pretence as Moric, but killed in a cornfield in Nojorid
4. Gheorghe Vașca (15), raped and strangled in a cornfield near the airport
5. Lazăr Momenciu (18), raped and strangled in a cornfield outside Sântandrei
6. Iosif Varga (16), raped and strangled in a cornfield near the airport
7. Dumitru Durgheu (15), male gigolo Sârca had met at the Pisica Albastra and had lived with for a few days. Durgheu was lured to the Apateului forest under the pretence that he and his companion were out to buy flour.

== Arrest, trial and imprisonment ==
By the time he had killed Durgheu, Sârca was already sought after by authorities with the help of Pârvu, who had seen him in the company of the missing boy. He fled to Zalău, where he was initially arrested for theft, but quickly identified as a wanted fugitive by the Oradea police. He was quickly returned to Oradea, where he concocted a story that he had been paid to bring young children to the residence of a Jewish doctor, Gheorghe David, who allegedly then drew blood from the victims to be used for revitalizing Holocaust survivors returning home from their internment at the concentration camps. After it was confirmed by authorities that David, who worked for the local police department as part of the medical personnel, had nothing to do with the case, Sârca recanted the story and admitted to raping and killing at least a dozen boys over the last two years.

Following a quick trial, Ioan Sârca was found guilty of all the murders and sentenced to two life imprisonment terms. While in prison, he underwent several psychiatric evaluations, the most notable of which occurred in 1948, conducted at the Hospital for Nervous Diseases by Dr. Vasile Ilea. In his report, Ilea concluded that his patient suffered from no mental abnormalities or diseases. This conclusion would later be disputed by another psychiatrist, who stated that Sârca was "an active homosexual, sadistic assassin, having preserved the memory both at the time of committing the crimes and in their preparation". Eventually, his two life sentences were reduced to 15 and 25 years, respectively, with Sârca demanding that they be merged in the hope that he could be released. This request was denied by the courts after it was concluded that he still posed a threat to the general population after he attempted to rape and kill another prisoner. During his prison time, Sârca allegedly met another serial killer, Gheorghe Toma, to whom he claimed to be the king's driver.

== Death ==
Despite repeated petitions for his release, Sârca remained imprisoned until his death in 1991, aged 80. He reportedly never showed guilt for any of his crimes. According to several inmates at the penitentiary he was last housed in, Sârca may have been forcefully euthanized by a pair of doctors who had arrived on the date of his death, claiming that they wanted to treat him for several diseases. According to this theory, the reason for this was to have Sârca's brain sent for analysis in Bucharest, but these claims have never been confirmed.

== See also ==
- List of serial killers by country
