= Ioan Arbore =

Romanian major-general

- Born: 23 February 1892; Cucuteni, Iași County, Kingdom of Romania
- Died: 25 December 1954 (aged 62); Văcărești Prison, Romanian People's Republic
- Burial place: Sfânta Vineri Cemetery, Bucharest
- Military career
- Allegiance: Kingdom of Romania
- Branch: Army
- Service years: 1909–1945
- Rank: 2nd Lieutenant (1911); 1st Lieutenant (1914); Captain (1917); Major (1920); Lieutenant Colonel (1929); Colonel (1935); Brigadier General (1941); Major General (1944)
- Commands: 2nd Fortress Brigade; 3rd Mixed Fortress Brigade
- Conflicts: World War I World War II
- Awards: Order of the Crown (Romania)

Ioan Arbore (February 23, 1892 – December 25, 1954) was a Romanian major-general during World War II.

Arbore was born in Cucuteni, Iași County, a distant descendant of hetman Luca Arbore. He spent his childhood in Sarinasuf, Tulcea County, where his father was a priest. He studied at the Military School (1909–1911), graduating with the rank of second lieutenant, and was promoted to lieutenant în 1914. He fought in World War I, was promoted to captain in 1917, and commanded an artillery battery. He completed his military education at the Higher War School (1919–1920) and at the Military Academy in Paris (1919–1921). Arbore was promoted to major in 1920, lieutenant colonel in 1929, and colonel in 1935. In 1939 he became prefect of Putna County. He was awarded in 1940 the Order of the Crown, Commander rank.

Arbore began his World War II career as the commanding officer of the 2nd Fortress Brigade in 1941, and as the commanding officer of the 3rd Mixed Fortress Brigade later that year. In 1942, he was the chief of staff, Third Army. From 14 July 1943 to 23 August 1944 he served in the Third Antonescu cabinet as Under-Secretary of State for Army and Civilian Supply. He went into reserve after the 23 August coup d'état and retired in March 1945, but was arrested the following year and condemned to ten years of imprisonment as a traitor in February 1948.

Arbore was incarcerated at Aiud Prison, and died at Văcărești Prison. He was buried at Sfânta Vineri Cemetery in Bucharest.
