= Radu Mironovici =

Romanian fascist politician

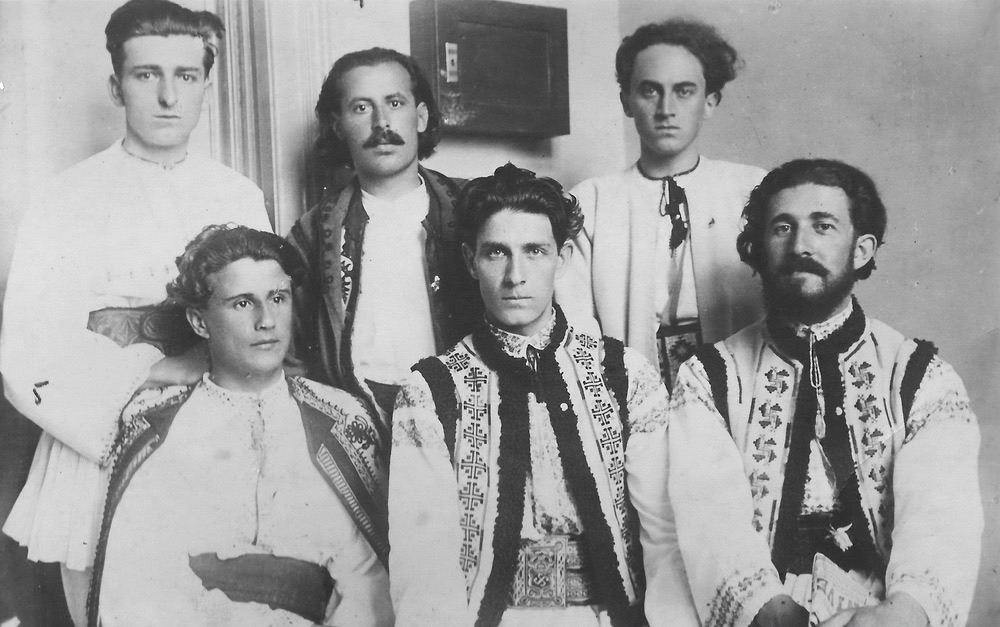
- Radu Mironovici (bottom left) and the Văcăreșteni
- Born: July 30, 1899; Arbore, Duchy of Bukovina, Austria-Hungary
- Died: July 29, 1979 (aged 79); Țigănești, Ciolpani, Socialist Republic of Romania

Radu Mironovici (30 July 1899 – 29 July 1979) was a founding member of the Legionary Movement, a far-right movement in Romania.

== Early life and education ==
Radu Mironovici was born on 30 July 1899 in Arbore, a commune then located within the Duchy of Bukovina, at the time under Habsburg rule within the Austro-Hungarian Empire (today located in Suceava County, Romania).

During World War I, he fled to Iași in the historical region of Moldavia (and from 1916–1918, the capital of Romania). There he enrolled as a student of electrical engineering at the University of Iași. During his studies he met and became close with Corneliu Zelea Codreanu, a young member of A. C. Cuza's National-Christian Defense League ("LANC"); he was also close with several other antisemitic student activists. He served as general secretary of the "'Avram Iancu' Academic Society" and was a reserve officer.

== Political activism ==
During his time as a student in Iași, Mironovici became involved in nationalist student politics. Mironovici, alongside students like Corneliu Zelea Codreanu and Ion Moța, began to organize around the concept of a numerus clausus or quota on Jewish students in Romanian schools. Due to his political involvement, he was disowned by his family.

During the 1922–1923 academic year, Mironovici was involved in organizing a student strike in support of a numerus clausus, which succeeded in preventing the start of lectures in June 1923.

Following a nationalist student conference in August 1923, Moța and Codreanu proposed that nationalist students should assassinate several Jewish public figures and Liberal politicians; the conspiracy was uncovered and several students were arrested, including Mironovici. After an initial hearing, Codreanu, Moța, Mironovici, Corneliu Georgescu, Ilie Gârneață, and Tudose Popescu remained in custody. The students were held in pre-trial detention at Văcărești Prison, on the outskirts of Bucharest, and were nicknamed the Văcăreșteni. The Văcăreșteni were eventually acquitted on a technicality, with the group's defence lawyers arguing that, since none of the students were public officials, they could not be charged with treason or "inciting revolution".

During their imprisonment, the group — most of whom were involved in the National-Christian Defense League ("LANC") — decided to form a new ultranationalist youth organization, inspired by an icon of the Archangel Michael located in the prison. After their release, Codreanu and several others decided to create a new structure within the LANC called the "Brotherhood of the Cross" ("Frăția de Cruce"); the group's first meeting was violently broken up by the police on the orders of police prefect Constantin Manciu. During a later altercation, Codreanu shot and killed Manciu. Codreanu was arrested and, as collateral, Mironovici, Moța, Gârneață, and Popescu were detained for two months at Galata prison, during which they undertook a hunger strike. They were released 11 days after beginning their strike.

In November 1927, Mironovici, alongside Codreanu, Moța, Gârneață, Gheorghe Clime, and Corneliu Georgescu, among others, took an oath as a founding member of the Legion of the Archangel Michael, which would later be known as the Legionary Movement or the Iron Guard. Upon the Legion's foundation, Mironovici was conferred with the rank "Guard of the Icon" ("Gărzii de la Icoană") by Codreanu. Mironovici took part in founding a Legionary cultural centre in Iași, fundraising by chauffeuring passengers from the city to nearby monasteries and other cities. He was also named leader of the new "Brotherhood of the Cross", the name being reused for the Legion's school-aged division.

In December 1936, establishing the highest grade in the Legionary hierarchy, Codreanu named Mironovici (as well as Moța, Georgescu, and Gârneață) to the rank of "Commandant of the Annunciation" ("Comandant al Bunei Vestiri").

As the Legionary Movement gained in membership and popularity, the Romanian government imposed a series of crackdowns. In February 1938, King Carol II seized emergency powers, suspending the constitution and creating a royal dictatorship, enforcing a ban on the Legionary Movement. In 1938, leader Codreanu was arrested alongside a number of other leading Legionnaires. In April 1938, Mironovici became part of an interim leadership group that would temporarily take charge of the Legion; however, this group was fraught with tensions, and he and most other interim leaders were eventually arrested, leaving Horia Sima the only interim leader remaining. Until 1940, Mironovici was held in Vaslui Prison.

== National Legionary State ==
The Legionary Movement came to power alongside Ion Antonescu in September 1940, forming the National Legionary State. Initially, Mironovici did not hold any official positions, possibly due to existing tensions that arose during interim leadership, wherein Mironovici formed a group opposed to Horia Sima, who was now serving as Vice President of the Council of Ministers and de facto co-leader of the state. Following the massacre of political prisoners at Jilava Prison by Legionnaires on 26 November 1940, Mironovici was appointed successor to Bucharest Police Prefect Ștefan Zăvoianu. He held this office from 28 November 1940 to 24 January 1941. He was also appointed General Secretary of Romania's Civil Aviation Administration.

Following the Legionnaire's Rebellion in January 1941, the majority of high-ranking Legionnaires fled Romania; Mironovici was one of the few to remain in the country. He formed a group opposed to potential collaboration with the communists (alongside Gheorghe Remontu, Corneliu Vicu Octavian, and Toma Simion).

== Later life and death ==
By 1944, with the Legionary Movement splintered both ideologically and geographically, Mironovici went underground and ceased political actions, instead asking the remaining Legionary leadership for money to support himself.

Following the end of World War II and Romania's transition to communism, Mironovici was arrested and sentenced to hard labour for life. He served part of his detention at Aiud Prison, where he became strongly religious. Between 1962 and 1964 he collaborated with a "re-education committee" at the prison, and was eventually released in 1964 after the introduction of Article 411, which pardoned political prisoners.

Mironovici retired to the Țigănești Monastery in Ciolpani (now in Ilfov County), around 40 kilometres (25 miles) north of Bucharest. He died of liver failure on 29 July 1979, at age 79.

He is buried at Țigănești alongside his wife, Elena, in front of a wooden cross co-dedicated to Mironovici and Legion co-founder Corneliu Georgescu.
