= Vasile Tcaciuc =

Romanian serial killer

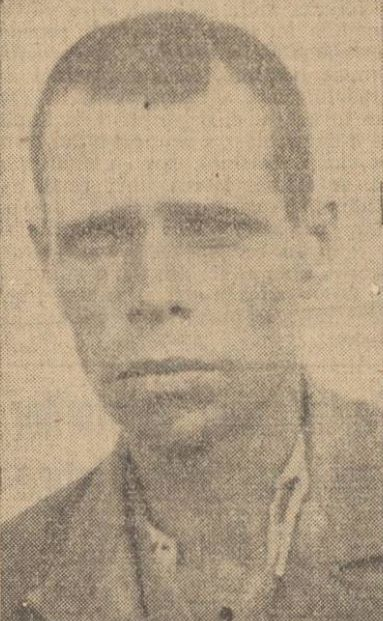
- Born: c. 1900; Bessarabia Governorate, Russian Empire or Kitsman, Duchy of Bukovina, Austria-Hungary
- Died: 17 October 1935 (aged 34–35); Iași, Kingdom of Romania
- Cause of death: Shot by police
- Other name: The Butcher of Iași
- Motive: Robbery
- Criminal charges: Murder

Details
- Victims: 21–26+
- Span of crimes: 1917–1935
- Country: Romania

Vasile Tcaciuc (c. 1900 – 17 October 1935) was a Romanian serial killer who lured victims and then murdered them with an axe that he specially constructed. He killed between 21 and 26 people from 1930 to 1935 and the primary motive was robbery.

Originally from Bessarabia (or, according to other sources, from Kitsman, Bukovina), Tcaciuc was known to the Iași police since around 1930, and had been arrested and sent to prison on robbery and burglary charges. On 7 September 1935, a dog found six bodies under his house in Iași. He confessed to having committed at least 21 murders at the behest of a 17-year-old girl, who then helped him bury the victims under the floors of several isolated houses and in a forest. He was shot dead by a policeman while trying to escape during a reconstruction of one of his crimes.

== See also ==
- List of serial killers by country
- List of serial killers by number of victims
