= Valcău de Jos =

- Commune
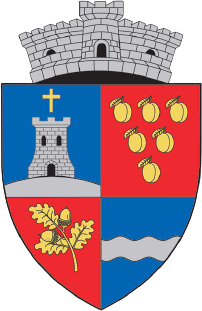
- Coat of arms

- Location in Sălaj County

- Location in Romania
- Coordinates: 47°07′40″N 22°44′20″E
- Country: Romania
- County: Sălaj

Government
  - Mayor (2020–2024): Ioan Roșan (PNL)
- Area: 63.23 km^{2} (24.41 sq mi)
- Elevation: 242 m (794 ft)
- Population (2021-12-01): 3,009
  - Density: 48/km^{2} (120/sq mi)
- Time zone: EET/EEST (UTC+2/+3)
- Postal code: 457345
- Area code: +(40) 260
- Vehicle reg.: SJ
- Website: www.primariavalcaudejos.ro

Valcău de Jos (Hungarian: Alsóvalkó) is a commune in Sălaj County, Crișana, Romania. It is composed of six villages: Lazuri (Újvágás), Preoteasa (Füzespaptelek), Ratovei (Rátonbükk), Sub Cetate (Valkóváralja), Valcău de Jos, and Valcău de Sus (Felsővalkó). It is 14 km (8.7 mi) southwest of Șimleu Silvaniei.

== History ==
Its name comes from the Slavic word vlk ("wolf"). Its Hungarian name Alsóvalkó means "Lower Valkó"; before 1899 it was called Magyarvalkó. Felsővalkó ("Upper Valkó") is now Valcău de Sus. Its castle was built in the late 13th century, and was unlawfully occupied by Dezső Elefánti in 1312. King Sigismund of Luxemburg laid siege to it in 1404. In 1665 the Ottoman army destroyed it and it was not rebuilt again.

== Population ==
In 1910 the village had 900 residents, with a Romanian majority and a significant Hungarian minority.

In 2002 the commune 3,302 inhabitants: 2,909 Romanians, 287 Roma, 105 Hungarians, and one Slovak. At the 2011 census, there were 2,851 inhabitants; of those, 80% were Romanians, 14.7% Roma, and 2.9% Hungarians. At the 2021 census, Valcău de Jos had a population of 3,009, of which 75.74% were Romanians, 17.88% Roma, and 1.6% Hungarians.

== Natives ==
- Lucian Bode (born 1974) politician
- Ioan Sârca (1911 – 1991), serial killer and rapist

== Sights ==
- Reformed Church in Valcău de Jos, built in the 19th century (1896), historic monument
- Valcău Citadel, medieval fortress built in the 13th century, historic monument
