= Adriana Georgescu-Cosmovici =

Political prisoner and memoirist from Romania

Adriana Georgescu-Cosmovici (23 July 1920 – 29 October 2005) was a political prisoner and memoirist from Romania, who emigrated to Western Europe in 1948.

== Biography ==
Born in Bucharest, Adriana Georgescu completed her secondary studies in 1939 at the Ion Heliade Rădulescu High School. After graduating in 1944 from the Faculty of Law of the University of Bucharest, she became the private secretary of General Nicolae Rădescu. After the fall of the Rădescu government on 28 February 1945, she was arrested on 29 July that year; held at Malmaison Prison in Bucharest, she was subjected to rape and torture. In her memoirs, she recounted the manner in which she had been tortured by a team of which Alexandru Nicolschi was a member, and indicated that the latter had been one of the three to have threatened her with guns. She also detailed various torture methods (including vicious beatings of detainees) Nicolschi personally engaged in during interrogations at Malmaison Prison. After a trial (where she detailed the torture and rape she endured during interrogation), she was sentenced in September 1945 to 4 years of prison for "plotting against the social order". She was pardoned by King Michael I in April 1947. Rearrested in August of that year, she was released after a few weeks of investigation.

On 2 August 1948 she managed to leave Romania clandestinely, together with her future husband, Ștefan Cosmovici, taking refuge in Vienna, then in Paris. Later, she became a correspondent for Radio Free Europe (1952–1957 and 1965–1967) and BBC Radio's Romanian section. After marrying the English officer and author Frank Lorimer Westwater, she became a citizen of the Great Britain in 1961. She died in London at age 85.

== Works ==
Cover art of La început a fost sfârșitul, published in Romania by Humanitas, 1992

- Au commencement était la fin: la dictature rouge à Bucarest, (Paris: Hachette, 1951)
- 1951: La început a fost sfârșitul, published in Romania by Humanitas Publishing House, 1992, and Cultural Foundation Memoria, 1999. ISBN 973-99523-0-5. Translated into Spanish as Al principio fue el fin, Xorki Publishing, Madrid, 2018. Translator: Joaquín Garrigós.

== Honours ==
In 2000, she was awarded the National Order of Faithful Service, in the rank of Commander.

== Bibliography ==
- Marcu, George (2017). Notable Women from Romania. From Yesterday and Today. Bucharest: Meronia Publishing House.
