= Brașov Prison =

Romanian prison

Brașov Prison was a prison located in Brașov, Romania.

The building, like the nearby Appeals Court, dates to 1902, during the period of Austro-Hungarian rule. It is on three levels, with one wing containing the cells and the other, perpendicular and asymmetrical, originally housing the prison hospital. Prior to 1945, members of the banned Romanian Communist Party were detained there, including Nicolae Ceaușescu. Beginning that year, after the establishment of a communist-led government, a number of buildings in the city were used as centers for interrogation and torture, including one operated by the NKVD. The prison housed overflow detainees under investigation by the secret police, which became the Securitate following the establishment of a communist regime at the end of 1947. The principal targets were the political and cultural elite of the Burzenland and adjacent areas, mainly sent to the Danube–Black Sea Canal once their cases were resolved.

Conditions were harsh, routinely featuring insults and beatings. Food consisted of three weak soups per day, plus a piece of mămăligă at lunch. One 4x6-meter cell alone held 50-55 prisoners, while high school students under arrest were held in the same cell. A new student arrived every few days, quickly leading to overcrowding. The cells had a single chamber pot, while the windows were kept wide open at all times and seasons. The cold and hunger weakened detainees’ resistance. In autumn 1950, two veterans of Pitești Prison arrived at Brașov. Armed with orders to repeat the experiment of “re-education” through torture, they managed to mistreat several prisoners, but were sent to the Canal several months later. Brașov Prison closed in 1953, when 286 detainees were sent to the new unit in nearby Codlea.
