= Romanian resistance movement during World War II =

Romanian resistance movement during World War II (1940-1945)

The Romanian resistance movement during World War II (Romanian: Mișcarea de rezistență din România) was a part of the anti-Axis resistance during World War II. This movement included both armed and unarmed actions by various resistance groups determined to overthrow the dictatorship of Ion Antonescu, which was allied with Nazi Germany, and to expel the Wehrmacht troops from the Kingdom of Romania. In Northern Transylvania, which was controlled by Nazi-aligned Hungary from 1940 to 1944, the resistance movement also sought the region's reintegration into Romania.

The movement comprised several factions, including a predominantly political faction led by the National Peasants' Party (PNȚ), more militant groups influenced by the Romanian Communist Party (PCR), and various militaries and civilians without specific party affiliations. The PNȚ faction, which also received support from the National Liberal Party leadership, avoided direct confrontation with Antonescu and Germany, aiming instead to peacefully influence the dictator to relinquish his powers and withdraw from Germany's war effort. Throughout the conflict, this group maintained contact with Britain's Special Operations Executive, yet it resisted calls for acts of sabotage or violent uprisings. Conversely, the PCR faction, already banned prior to the war, achieved only limited success in sabotage operations. However, by 1944, it had established a few partisan groups and a significant paramilitary force. Unlike the PNȚ, the propaganda of the PCR and its affiliated organizations openly advocated for the regime's overthrow and active combat against German forces. Despite its support for the Soviet Union, the PCR struggled to establish consistent contact with the Soviets for most of the war. Romanian communists exiled in the Soviet Union before the war however helped the Soviet authorities establish two divisions made up of Romanian prisoners of war. Created in 1943, the two divisions ("Tudor Vladimirescu" and "Horea, Cloșca și Crișan") would eventually fight on the side of the Allies, initially under Soviet command, and later integrated into the Romanian Army.

Following the Axis defeat at the Battle of Stalingrad, a number of high-ranking officers loyal to King Michael I, who resented his reduction to figurehead status by Antonescu, joined the resistance. As the Soviet counter-offensive breached Romanian borders in the spring of 1944, these various resistance factions united to form the National Democratic Bloc in June. This coalition played a pivotal role in the overthrow of Antonescu by King Michael on August 23, subsequently supporting the Romanian Army in the liberation of the country from German occupation.

== Background ==
Against the backdrop of Nazi successes on the Western Front, the Romanian government under King Carol II was compelled in the summer of 1940 to cede Bessarabia and Northern Bukovina to the Soviet Union and to relinquish Northern Transylvania to Hungary as mandated by the Second Vienna Award. (Note: In Northern Transylvania the Romanian population was targeted for reprisal actions by Hungarian nationalist. This included military abuses, illegal arrests, torture, lynchings and summary executions (see massacres in Ip, Nușfalău, Treznea).) The king was subsequently overthrown in a coup in September 1940, resulting in the establishment of a "National Legionary State" led by the fascist Iron Guard and General Ion Antonescu. In October 1940, the Wehrmacht was "invited" to occupy the remaining parts of Romania, and Germany gradually assumed control of the Romanian economy. Following an abortive rebellion, the Iron Guard was suppressed, solidifying Antonescu's position as the sole totalitarian ruler of Romania. The country maintained its pro-Nazi trajectory, and in June 1941, it joined Germany in the invasion of the Soviet Union.

== Resistance movements ==
=== Armed resistance ===
Anti-German sentiment remained very strong in Romania, both among civilians and soldiers, following the harsh Central Power occupation during World War I, and the fact that, since its arrival in Romania in October 1940, the Wehrmacht behaved like a conqueror, multiplying military requisitions, although the Antonescu regime was Nazi Germany's ally. The partisans were actually peasants starved due to military requisitions and who were fleeing from conscription, anti-fascist townspeople, Jews fleeing the pogroms of the Iron Guard, forced labor and deportation to Transnistria, as well as deserters. Anti-fascist soldiers secretly procured them weapons; between June 1941 and August 1944, 8,600 court-martial sentences were handed down for such actions. As happened in France, the attack on the USSR in June 1941 brought to light the Communist Party and made it join the opponents of fascism.

=== Romanian allied divisions ===
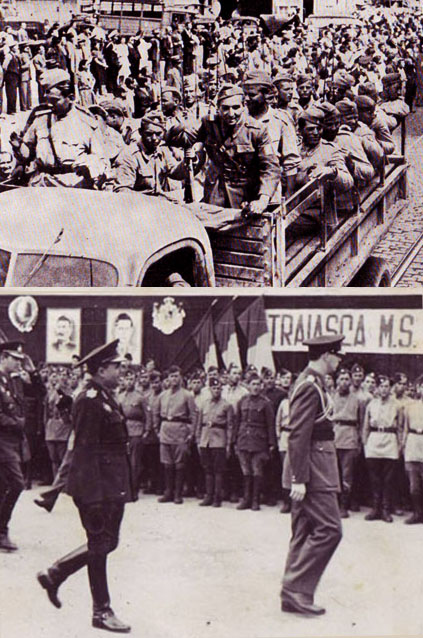
Above: The Tudor Vladimirescu Division entering Bucharest, end of August 1944. Bottom: King Michael I reviewing of the troops, beginning of September 1944

The "Tudor Vladimirescu" and "Horea, Cloșca și Crișan" divisions fought in the Soviet Union against the Germans. Their numbers increased during the campaign against the USSR (June 1941 - August 1944), due to the large number of deserters and Romanian prisoners captured by the Red Army. The "Tudor Vladimirescu" Division was commanded by generals Nicolae Cambrea and Iacob Teclu. The "Horea, Cloșca și Crișan" Division was commanded by general Mihail Lascăr, who had surrendered and joined the Soviets at the Battle of Stalingrad. The two divisions advanced westward, by the end of the war reaching Bratislava in Slovakia on April 4, 1945 Humpolec, in Bohemia, on May 7, 1945. The "Tudor Vladimirescu" Division (6,000 men at formation, 19,000 at the end of the war, mostly peasants) was placed in front of the German or Hungarian divisions and used in direct combat. As for the Romanian prisoners captured by the Soviets, the choice between captivity in Siberia and enlistment in the "Tudor Vladimirescu" or "Horea, Cloșca și Crișan" Divisions led many of them to choose the second option, even if they had no clear political beliefs. By joining these divisions, they received a left-wing political education under the supervision of political commissars, members of the Romanian Communist Party: Colonel Mircea Haupt (brother of the Communist historian turned French citizen Georges Haupt) for the "Tudor Vladimirescu" Division and Colonel Valter Roman (former member of the International Brigades in the Spanish Civil War and father of the former prime minister of Romania, Petre Roman) for the "Horea, Cloșca and Crișan" Division. After the war, on February 9, 1946, 58 officers from these two divisions were awarded the Order of Victory.

The turning of the Romanian Front in August 1944

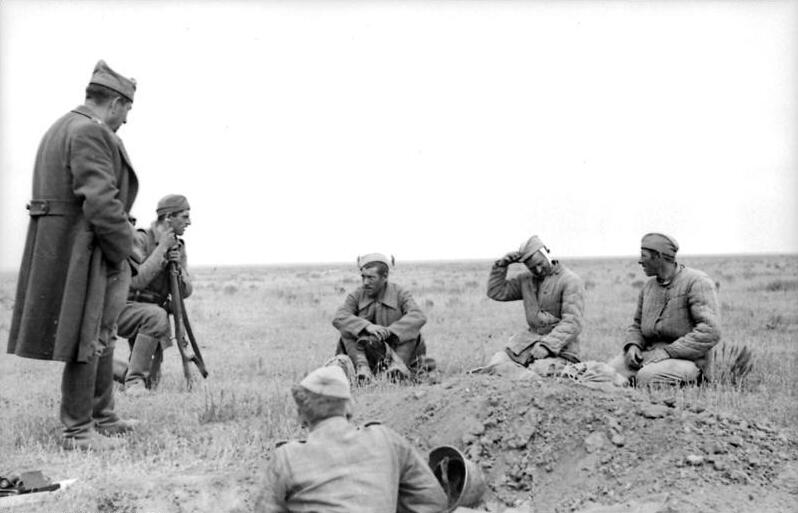
Romanian and Soviet soldiers talking near Stalingrad, late 1942. The latter were theoretically prisoners of the former, but not for long

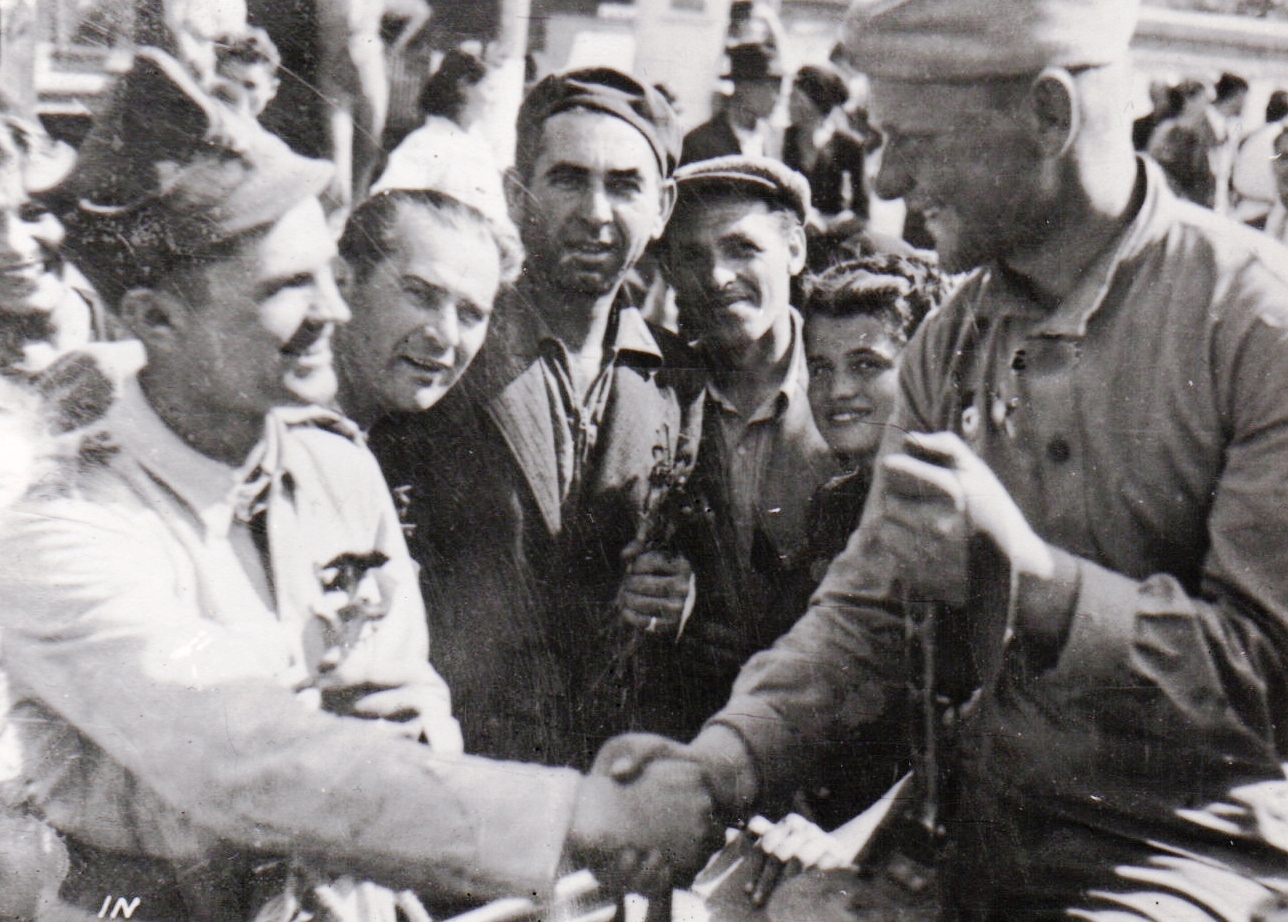
Soviet Forces welcomed as allies by Romanian soldiers in 1944

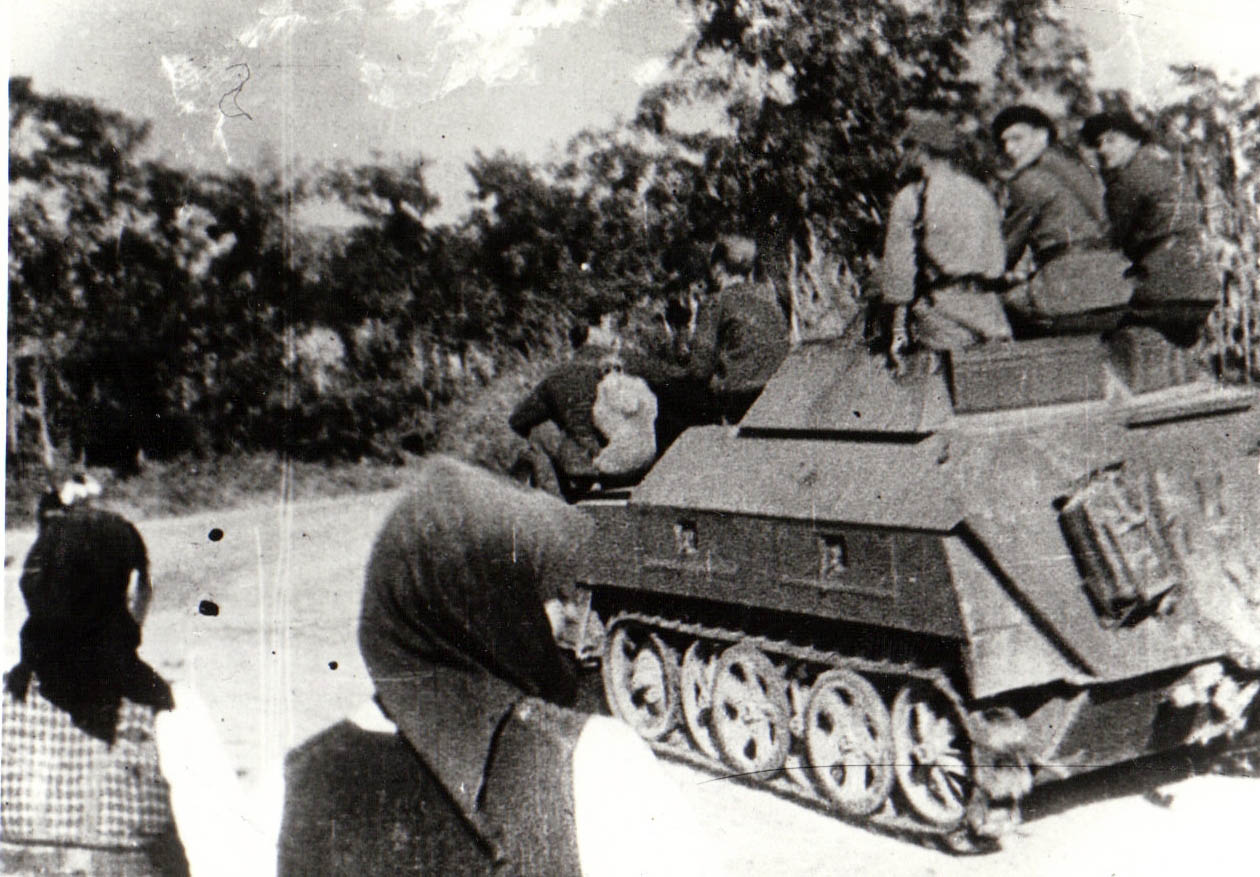
Romanian mountain troops in Transylvania, at war with the Axis troops, in 1944

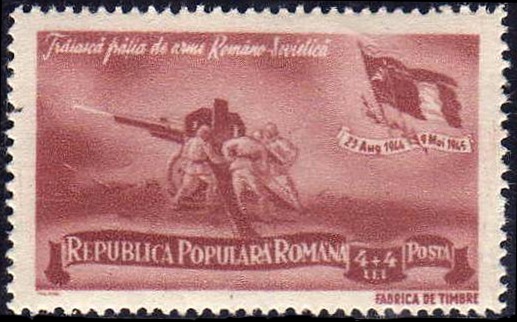
"Long live the Romanian-Soviet brotherhood of arms!", Romanian stamp from 1948

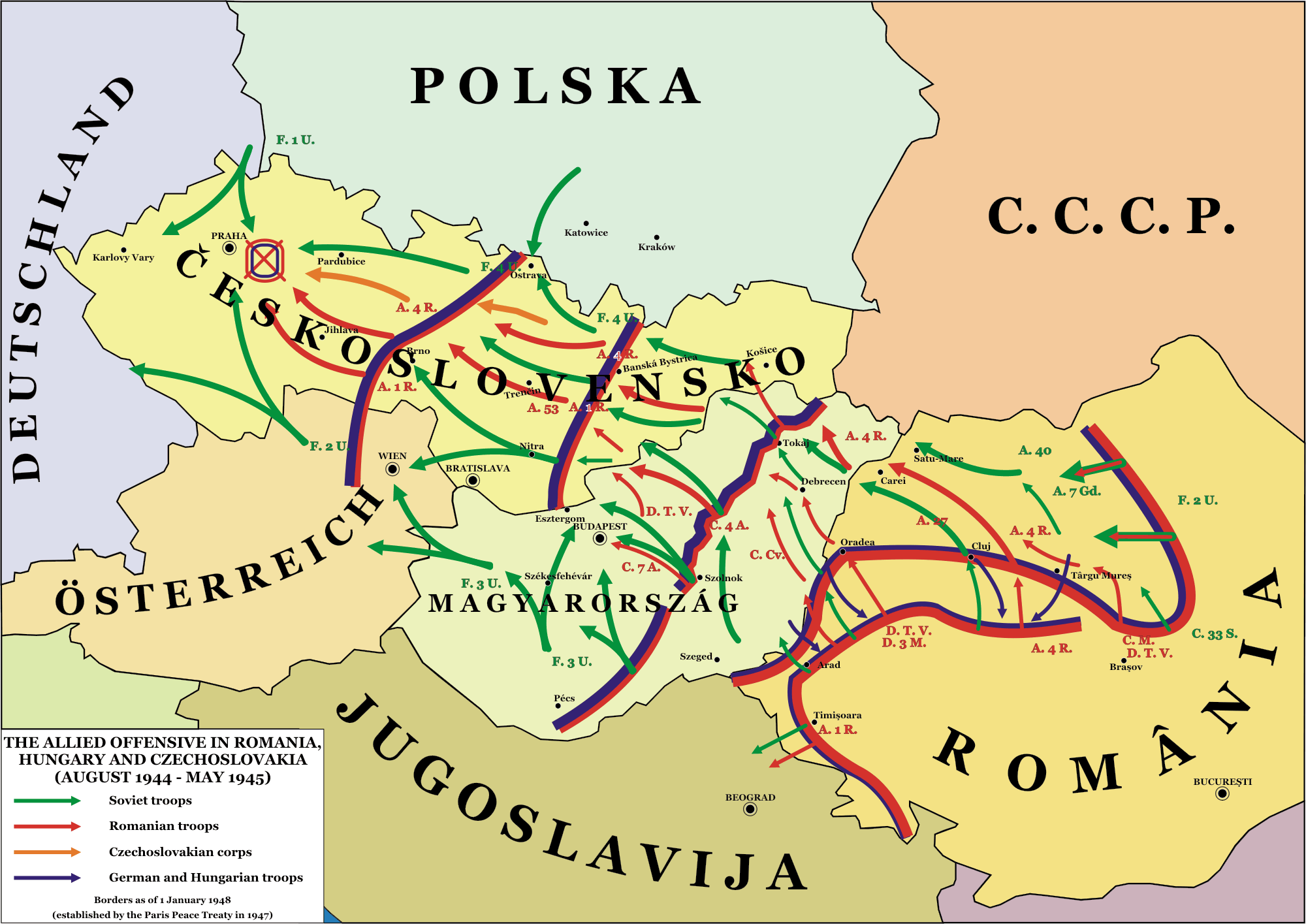
Romania's operations against the Axis on the Allied side (in red), between August 24, 1944, and May 7, 1945

=== Civil resistance ===
As Antonescu's Romania engaged in the Holocaust, humanitarian organizations, among which the Romanian Red Cross played the main role, created aid channels (essentially food and medical supplies) for the persecuted people (especially those deported to the Transnistria Governorate) in order to ensure passage through Bulgaria (a member of the Axis but which did not participate in fighting against the Allies) and Turkey (a neutral state) to Palestine. Another organization was the Romanian Maritime Service, (Note: The Romanian Maritime Service, whose headquarters were in Bucharest, but whose ships were based in Constanța, was a state shipping company established in 1895, which served the sea routes connecting Constanța, Istanbul, İzmir, Piraeus, Alexandria, Haifa, and Beirut, using passenger ships traditionally painted white, and for this reason nicknamed "the white swans of the Black Sea".) who operated throughout the war the passenger ships Transilvania, Medeea, Emperor Trajan and Dacia, together with a dozen other smaller ships, between Constanța and Istanbul, in the service of the organization "Aliya" led by Samuel Leibovici and Eugen Maissner, saving over 60,000 people.

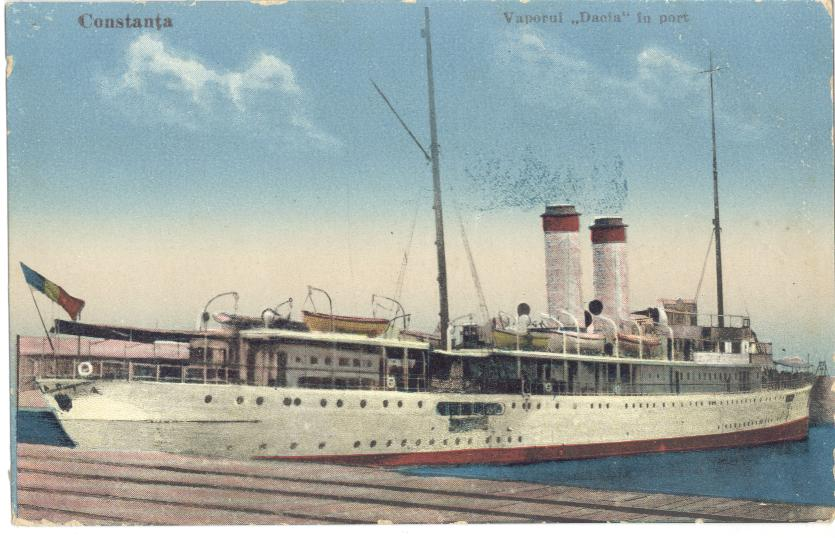
The passenger ship Dacia built in 1908 at Saint-Nazaire, France

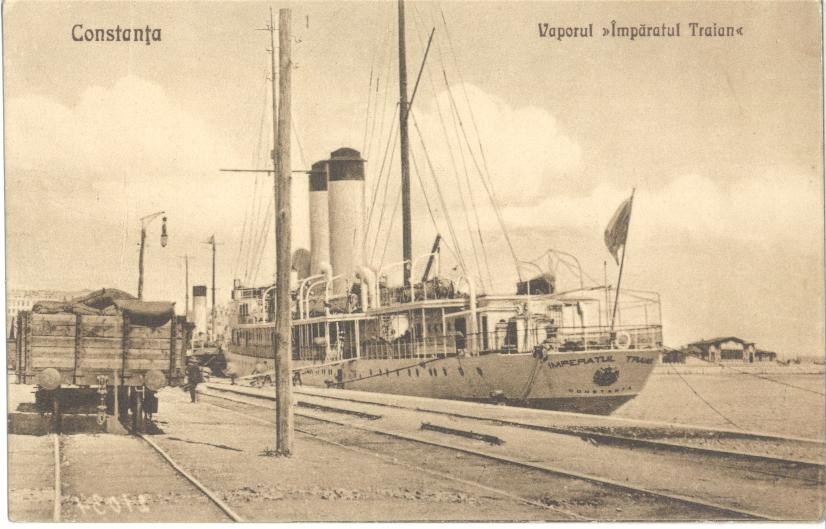
The passenger ship Emperor Trajan built in 1906 at Saint-Nazaire

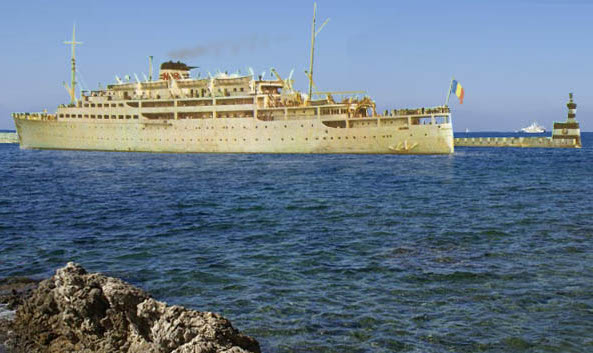
The passenger ship Transilvania in Constanța in 1967, built in 1938 at the shipyard Burnmeister-Wain in Copenhagen, Denmark

More than 1,000 people perished due to the torpedoing of their ships by Soviet submarines or the refusal of the Turkish authorities to allow them to disembark (the tragedies of the ships Struma and Mefküre). "Aliya" also rented trains that, passing through Bulgaria (which was in the Axis, but did not participate in the fighting with the Allies), transported tens of thousands of Romanian Jews to Turkey (a neutral country).

For their merits, 69 Romanians were awarded the title granted by the Israeli state through the Yad Vashem institute, of "Righteous Among the Nations". Among them were Viorica Agarici, chairwoman of a local office of the Romanian Red Cross, the pharmacist Dr. Dumitru Beceanu from Iași, and Traian Popovici, the mayor of Cernăuți. The Red Cross sent food and medicine to deportees in Transnistria and persuaded officers not to carry out orders, allowing families like Wilhelm Filderman's or Norman Manea's to survive. The leading World War II fighter ace in Romania, Constantin Cantacuzino, (Note: During World War II, the Romanian fighter ace Constantin Cantacuzino was credited with 43 aerial victories (one shared) and 11 unconfirmed. According to the counting system used through much of the war, his kill total was 69, the highest in the Romanian Air Force.) organized a network of taking over the downed American airmen in Romania and clandestinely transporting them to Turkey. He was secretly protected by King Michael I and the commander of the Bucharest garrison, General Constantin Sănătescu, who provided him with communication resources and connected him with the clandestine inter-allied mission Operation Autonomous of the SOE.

=== Political resistance ===
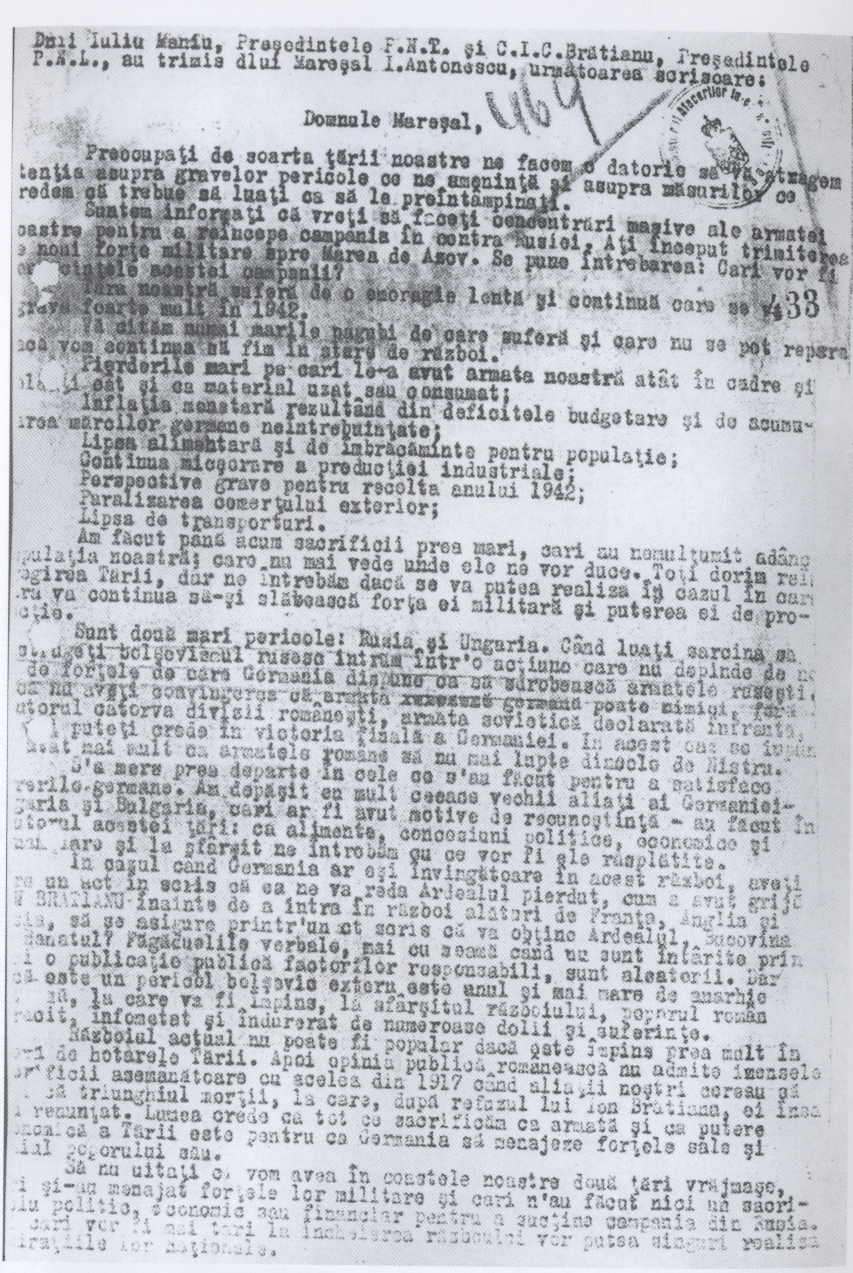
The memorandum of the leaders of the democratic opposition, Iuliu Maniu and Ion C. Brătianu, sent to Ion Antonescu (1942), against the engagement of the Romanian Army in the offensive on Soviet territory

Political personalities formed, without Antonescu reacting otherwise than by ordering house arrest measures, opposition groups that publicly protested against the regime's policy. Exasperated by the "passive betrayal" of the Romanian dictator, who "has assured the Führer of his loyalty, but tolerates anti-German actions", Joseph Goebbels noted, on February 19, 1941, in his diary: "Antonescu maintains his government with the support of Freemasonry and Germany's enemies. Our local minority is having a hard time. The Reich made such an effort in vain".

In the summer of 1944, all these political groups, including the Communists, united in a "National Democratic Bloc", secretly led by the young King Michael I and the leaders of the traditional democratic parties. This council attempted to negotiate in Sweden (through ambassador Frederic Nanu and his agent Neagu Djuvara) and in Turkey (through Prince Barbu Știrbey, descendant of the former Wallachian ruler Barbu Dimitrie Știrbei) about a change of alliance in favor of the Western Allies, requesting instead an Anglo-American landing in the Balkans and an occupation of Romania by the armies of the western countries and not by the Red Army.

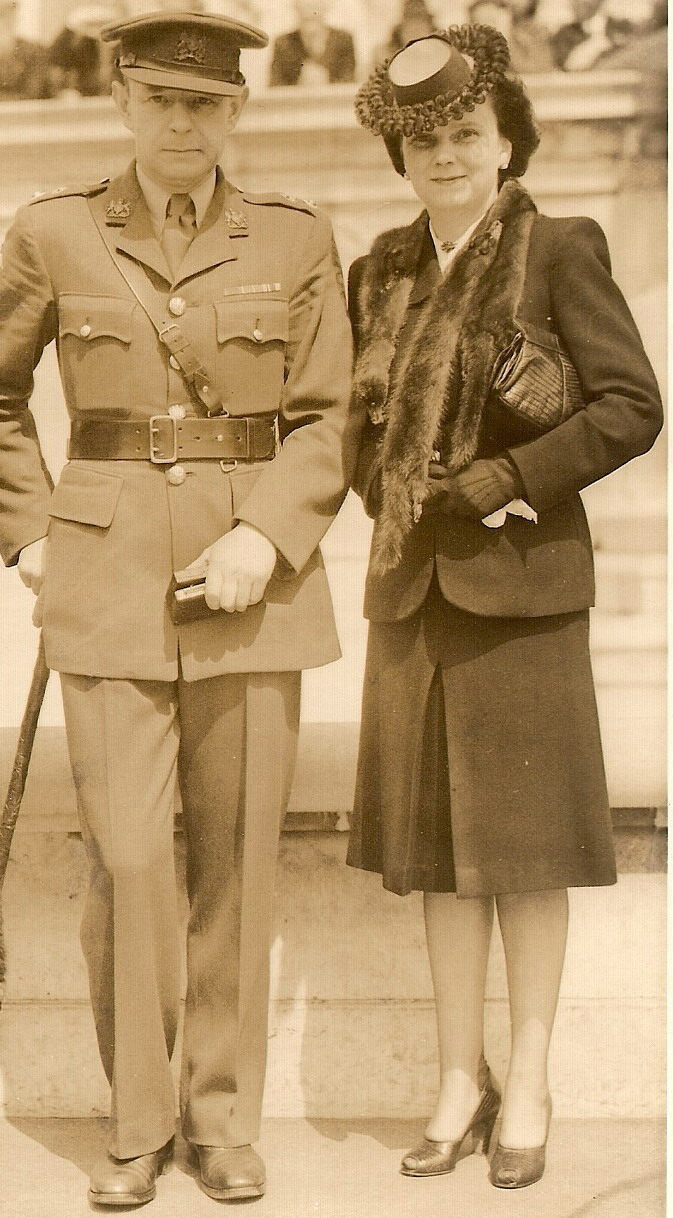
Lieutenant-Colonel Alfred de Chastelain, commander of Operation Autonomous, with his wife, in 1945

In order to discuss directly with the Romanian government the possibility of a Romanian defection from the Axis to the Allied camp, a clandestine inter-allied mission of Special Operations Executive (SOE) was parachuted near Bucharest, (Operation Autonomous). The three agents parachuted into Romania were Lieutenant Colonel Alfred Gardyne de Chastelain, experienced SOE officer, as the leader, Captain Ivor Porter, and Captain Silviu Mețianu, a Romanian who had emigrated to the UK. They were captured by Romanian gendarmerie almost immediately in the area of Plosca. They were held as well-treated prisoners of war at the gendarmerie headquarters in Bucharest. On 23 August 1944 the young King Michael I carried out his well prepared coup d’état which took Adolf Hitler completely by surprise, and Romania then changed sides. The British prisoners were released and that evening the king arranged for de Chastelain to fly to Istanbul, whence he could travel to Cairo and then London to report. Mețianu stayed on for a time and then returned to England. Porter remained to maintain a radio link with SOE headquarters until the British mission arrived in the country.

=== Results ===
The two divisions, Tudor Vladimirescu and Horea, Cloșca și Crișan, were joined by the Romanian army, since on August 23, 1944, the dictator Ion Antonescu was deposed and arrested by King Michael I. Without waiting for the Soviet response to its request for an armistice, Romania declared war on the Axis powers and committed its 550,000 soldiers to the fight against Nazi Germany. As a result, the front moved 700 km west and south in less than a week, and according to Winston Churchill's estimates, Romania's entry into the war alongside the Allies would avoided the deaths of hundreds of thousands of Russian soldiers and hastened the end of World War II by six months. Once war against the Axis was declared, the Romanian forces, reinforced with partisan recruits and placed under Soviet command, launched their offensive against Hungary, advancing as far as Slovakia.

From August 24, 1944 to May 9, 1945, Romania was an allied country, which allowed it to participate at the Paris Peace Conference of 1947 to recover Northern Transylvania, which had been assigned to Hungary in 1940 as a result of the Second Vienna Award. The military operations of the Romanian Army against the Axis took place between August 24, 1944 (starting from Romania's own territory) and May 7, 1945 (Chotěboř–Humpolec area, 90 km (56 mi) east of Prague). For his contribution to the side of the Allies, King Michael I received the Order of Victory, by order of Joseph Stalin himself.

== See also ==
- Resistance during World War II
- Romania in World War II
- Operation Autonomous
- Battle of Romania

== Bibliography ==
- Frießner, Johannes (1956). Verratene Schlachten: die Tragödie der deutschen Wehrmacht in Rumänien und Ungarn [Betrayed Battles: The Tragedy of the German Wehrmacht in Romania and Hungary] (in German). Hamburg: Holsten-Verlag. OCLC 1277245306.
- Matthieu Boisdron. "La Roumanie succombe à l'Axe: un royaume en crise" [Romania succumbs to the Axis: a kingdom in crisis]. Histoire(s) de la Dernière Guerre no. 9, January 2011 (in French) (Ch. "Le paysage ethnique de la Roumanie: entre-deux-guerres", "Le démembrement de la Grande Roumanie: 1940"): 42–47.
- Deletant, Dennis (2006). Hitler's Forgotten Ally: Ion Antonescu and his Regime, Romania, 1940-1944. Basingstoke: Palgrave Macmillan. ISBN 9781403993410. OCLC 69021642.
- Lache, Gheorghe Tututi, Stefan (1978). România si Conferinta de pace de la Paris din 1946 [Romania and the Paris Peace Conference of 1946]. Cluj-Napoca: Editura Dacia. OCLC 432410676.
