= Eugen Dobrogeanu =

Romanian colonel and bibliographer

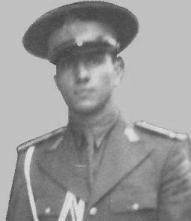
- Eugen Dobrogeanu, 1942.
- Born: October 17, 1913
- Died: February 18, 1992 (aged 78)
- Military career
- Allegiance: Romania
- Conflicts: World War II; Operation Autonomous

Eugen Dobrogeanu (17 October 1913 – 18 February 1992) was a Romanian officer (colonel retd.), the first bibliographer of the Romanian criminology and active participant in Operation Autonomous.

== School and professional career ==
After finishing elementary school in 1925, Eugen Dobrogeanu attended the high school Gheorghe Sincai in Bucharest and acquired bachelor's degree in 1932. In the same year he was admitted to the gendarmerie officer school, which he graduated from in 1935. Subsequently, he acted as an instructor at the non-commissioned gendarmerie officer school in Focşani, where he lectured on criminology and forensic science until 1940.

As a graduate of law high school – faculty of jurisprudence – and holder of the antedoctorate oral examination in economy policy, Eugen Dobrogeanu published numerous studies about scientific police, criminology and applied criminology. In his work "The forensic science in the Romanian bibliography" ("The modern police", Focsani 1940) he emphasised, among other things, the merits of professors Drs. Nicolae Minovici and Mina Minovici, whose activity, within the scope of the forensic medicine research in Bucharest, put the basis of the Romanian forensic jurisprudence.

At the beginning of 1941 Eugen Dobrogeanu was transferred to the supervisory office of the gendarmerie in Bucharest where he was appointed chief of the department for the pursuit of the Legionary Movement. In this function he conducted centralisation and systematisation of everyday information bulletins.

== Participation in Operation Autonomous ==
Between 1943 and 1944 major Eugen Dobrogeanu was directly involved in the Operation Autonomous by order of general Constantin Tobescu, as a member of the military guard in charge with the custody of three English officers: Alfred Gardyne de Chastelain, Ivor Porter and Silviu Meţianu, parachutists taken and held captive in Romania.

In spite of all dangers Eugen Dobrogeanu maintained amicable relations with the prisoners while he helped them and delivered to them information about everyday events. Finally, he helped the English officers even in the procurement of the information which was to help them escape. Unfortunately, the plan could not be brought to execution as Eugen Dobrogeanu was suddenly transferred to the East front to Odessa.

== Postwar and later years ==
Between April, 1946 and March, 1948 Eugen Dobrogeanu worked as assistant chief commander of the gendarmerie officer school where he lectured on forensic science as well as methods of scientific police and fight against criminal economic activities. Afterwards he was recalled in the security of the capital city where he performed extensive work, not only by disclosure of the legionary organizations but also in the fight against the criminal economic activities.

From September, 1948 to January, 1949 – after the dissolution of the gendarmerie – Eugen Dobrogeanu acted as a member of the Organizing committee of the Romanian militia. Then he was appointed as manager to the department of public security and maintenance of order, as well as head of the committee's office, and advanced to the rank of lieutenant-colonel.

On 31 March 1951 Eugen Dobrogeanu was arrested under the accusation of "crime and intensive activity against the working class and revolutionary movement". After nearly 5 years of investigation he was acquitted according to the court decision No. 114/1956, found not guilty and declared innocent, under abolition of all imposed punishments and actions.

Released from prison in 1956, Eugen Dobrogeanu worked first as a helper in a service transport company, then as an economist with the international trading agency "Romtrans" in Bucharest, from which post he went into retirement.

After the Romanian Revolution of 1989 lieutenant-colonel Eugen Dobrogeanu was rehabilitated and was promoted to the rank of colonel retd. He died on 18 January 1992.

== Works (selection) ==
- Terrorism under mask of nationalism (Terorismul sub masca naţionalismului) in "Gendarmerie-Magazine" No. 3–4, March–April, 1938 pp. 81–83.
- Photography in penal investigation (Fotografia în cercetările penale) in "Gendarmerie-Magazine", 1938.
- Microphotography in penal investigation (Microfotografia în cercetările penale) in "Modern Police", 1938.
- Roentgenography in penal investigation (Radiografia în cercetările penale) in "Gendarmerie-Magazine", October, 1938.
- Metric photography (Fotografia metrică) in "Gendarmerie-Magazine", July 1939
- Film technology in penal investigation (Cinematografia în cercetările penale), Focșani 1939.
- Application of penal photography (Applicarea fotografiei penale), in "Gendarmerie-Magazine", October 1940.
- Forensic science in the Roumanian bibliography (Poliția științifică în bibliografia română), Focșani 1940.
- Photography in infrared and ultraviolet lighting in penal investigation (Fotografia la razele infraroșii și ultraviolete în poliția științifică), November 1940.
- Firearm study (Studiul armelor de foc), in "Gendarmerie-Magazine", 1940.
- Identification according to foot prints (Identificarea cu ajutorul urmelor de pași), in "Gendarmerie-Magazine, 1942.
- Design in penal investigation (Desenul în tehnica cercetării infracțiunilor), in "Gendarmerie-Magazine", 1943.
- Criminal record (Cazierul judiciar), in der Gendarmerie-Zeitschrift, 1943.
- Basic principles of forensic science. The speaking portrait and the descriptive distinguishing mark (Noțiuni de poliție tehnică. Portretul vorbit sau semnalmentul descriptiv), in "Gendarmerie-Magazine, Jahr XXIII, No. 3-4-5-6, March–June, 1945, pp. 69–80.
- Money counterfeiting (Falsificarea de bani), in "Gendarmerie-Magazine" No. 1-3, January–March, 1947, pp. 23–27.

== Distinctions ==
- Order of the Crown of Romania
- Medal "liberation from Fascismus"
- Medal "For Victory over Germany in the Great Patriotic War"
- Honorary Member of the Italian Scout Federation "Federscout"
