= Romanian resistance movement =

Romanian resistance movement can refer to

- Romanian resistance movement during World War II
- Romanian anti-communist resistance movement
