= Eugen Cristescu =

Romanian intelligence chief (1895–1950)

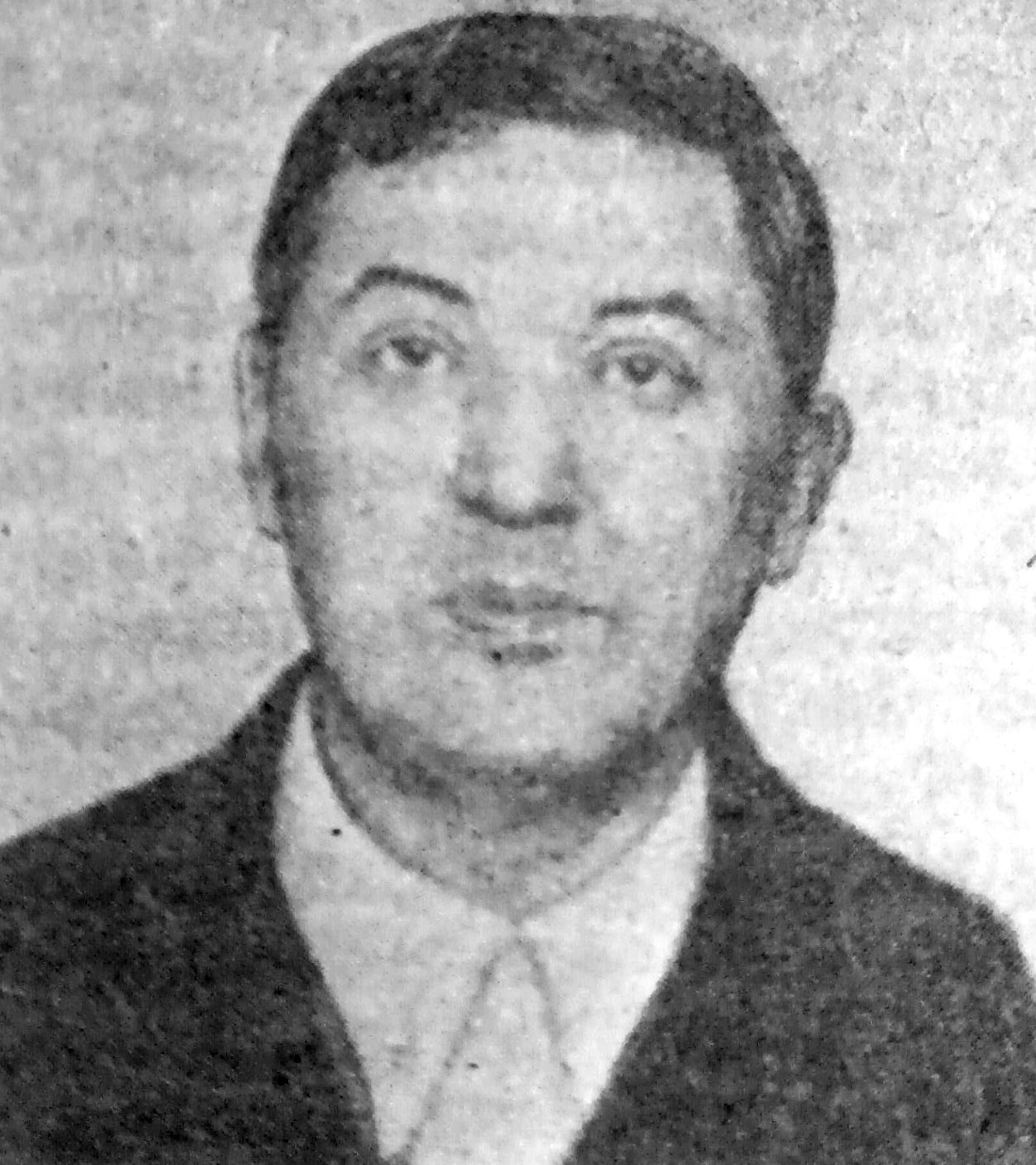
Cristescu's mug shot, taken shortly before his death in 1950

Eugen Cristescu (3 April 1895 – 12 June 1950) was the second head of the Kingdom of Romania's domestic espionage agency, the Secret Intelligence Service (SSI), forerunner of today's SRI, convicted in 1946 as a war criminal. He previously served as head of Siguranța Statului, the secret police.

== Biography ==
=== Early life ===
Cristescu was born in Oituz, Bacău County into a large, poor family. His father Ioan was a schoolteacher there, while his mother's main occupation was raising her six sons and three daughters. His brothers were Ioan, chief of staff at the Ilfov County prefecture; Vasile, lieutenant colonel in the personal guard of Marshal Ion Antonescu; Mihai, commissioner at the Bucharest Prefecture; Mircea, employee of the Foreign Ministry's Protocol Service; and Gheorghe, head of the photo identification service and then a director in the Secret Intelligence Service of the Romanian Army, which on 13 November 1940, a day after Eugen became its head, was renamed the Special Intelligence Service.

After finishing primary school in Târgu Ocna, Cristescu attended the Veniamin Theological Seminary in Iași, graduating in 1916. That year he enrolled at the Law Faculty of the University of Iași, but interrupted his studies due to World War I. He took part in the autumn 1916 campaign with the rank of sergent TR (reduced term sergeant) in the sanitary service. He continued his university studies after the war ended, and received the title of doctor in legal sciences six years after graduating.

=== Career ===
After finishing university, he worked for fourteen years at Siguranța Statului, followed by six years in leadership posts at the Interior Ministry. He steadily climbed the professional ladder, from bureau undersecretary to general director. In November 1940, two months after his predecessor Mihail Moruzov was arrested, he became chief of the Special Intelligence Service. During his whole career, six orders and two medals were conferred upon him. He was sanctioned but once, on 9 November 1932, by the Interior Minister, “fined through loss of salary for one day for insubordination”, without details being offered.

Cristescu, who unlike Moruzov was totally obedient to Antonescu, assumed leadership of the SSI at a time when Romania was a satellite of Nazi Germany, formally not yet in World War II but rapidly preparing for it. His political mission included internal espionage against political figures and especially Jews, of whom exact lists with their names were being drawn up, particularly in Moldavia. It was Cristescu who gave the order for a special unit, later known as Operational Echelon I, to enter Moldavia, which it did on 18 June 1941 (four days before Romania joined combat), equipped with information on local Jews’ situation, location and living conditions, and large quantities of posters depicting distorted faces of Jews or which called them spies or saboteurs. Nine days later, the Iași pogrom was carried out. According to postwar testimony offered by Traian Borcescu, head of the SSI's counter-intelligence section between 1941 and 1944, “as to the preparation and staging of the Iași massacres, I suspect that they were the handiwork of the First Operative Echelon, since Eugen Cristescu told me when he returned to Bucharest: ‘The great deeds I accomplished in Moldavia, I accomplished in collaboration with Supreme Headquarters, Section II’”. In his own written postwar deposition, Cristescu denied SSI involvement at Iași, claiming it had been organised by the Gestapo and the SD. It is certain that the SSI armed members of the banned Iron Guard instigated and took part in the pogrom; it is unlikely that Cristescu acted on his own initiative, and later testimony from SSI officers indicates that he kept both Foreign Minister Mihai Antonescu and Ion Antonescu informed about the massacres’ progress.

Cristescu closely monitored the significant spy networks operating on Romanian soil during the war—Allied as well as German. Relations with Germany were fairly steady until November 1942, when crushing losses on the Eastern Front led the SSI, at Cristescu's order, to cultivate links with the Allies’ intelligence services. Of particular note was Operation Autonomous, in which three British agents were parachuted into Romania on 23 December 1943, captured, and interrogated directly by Cristescu (with Antonescu's approval), who refused to hand them over for questioning in Berlin. Using the three, over the following months Cristescu bargained with the SOE, holding out the prospect of an armistice whereby Romania would switch sides in the war. He was aware of the secret armistice negotiations being undertaken by the leaders of the political opposition with the British and the Americans. Germany pressed for their arrest, but Cristescu (again so directed by Antonescu) assured them their protection, and even took part in the discussions.

=== Downfall ===
On 23 August 1944, the King Michael's Coup took place and brought Romania over to the Allies, but the event took Cristescu by surprise. He was arrested on 24 September, initially interrogated by the Romanian authorities. On 14 October, the Allied Soviet High Command took him into custody; together with generals Constantin Z. Vasiliu, Constantin Pantazi, and Constantin Tobescu, Marshal Ion Antonescu and his wife Maria, and professors Mihai Antonescu, Gheorghe Alexianu, and Radu Lecca, he was taken to Moscow, where the group remained until spring 1946.

On 17 May 1946, accused before the Bucharest People's Tribunal, he was sentenced to death for "war crimes and the national disaster". High Royal Decree nr. 1746 commuted his sentence to hard labour for life, along with those of Lecca (former commissioner general for the Jewish question) and General Pantazi. This decree was initiated by Lucrețiu Pătrășcanu, Justice Minister in the Communist-dominated Petru Groza government. In May 1946, Cristescu was incarcerated at Jilava Prison. He died four years later in Văcărești Prison; the official autopsy record indicated his death was due to coronary artery disease.
