= Dobrogeanu =

Dobrogeanu is a Romanian-language surname literally meaning someone from Dobruja (Romanian: Dobrogea). Notable people with the surname include:

- Alexandru Dobrogeanu-Gherea, Romanian communist militant, son of Constantin
- Constantin Dobrogeanu-Gherea, Romanian Marxist theorist
- Eugen Dobrogeanu, Romanian officer
- Ioan Dobrogeanu-Gherea, Romanian philosopher, essayist, and concert pianist
