= Operation Autonomous =

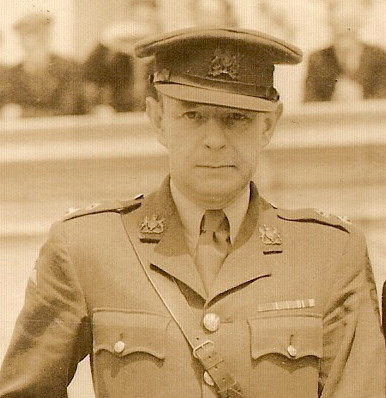
Lt. Col. Alfred Gardyne de Chastelain in 1945

Operation Autonomous was a clandestine operation carried out on the territory of Romania by the Special Operations Executive (SOE) set up by Winston Churchill for the duration of World War II to assist local Resistance movements. Although captured by the Romanian Gendarmerie soon after being dropped into the country, the mission proved vital in maintaining contact between the Western Allies and both the Antonescu government and the opposition led by Iuliu Maniu.

== Background ==
After the establishment of the SOE in July 1940, a Romania section was also formed. The role of this section was to sabotage oil shipments from Romania to Germany and to attempt to form a resistance movement by maintaining contacts with pro-British political actors such as Iuliu Maniu. The SOE representative until February 1941, when Romania severed its diplomatic relations with Britain, was Alfred Gardyne de Chastelain an engineer who previously worked for the Unirea Oil Company. After he left the country in the autumn of 1940, de Chastelain was assigned as head of SOE in Istanbul.

In February 1941, de Chastelain recruited Valeriu "Rică" Georgescu to organize intelligence-gathering activities in the country. The network set up by Georgescu, under the code name "Jockey", was also to function as a means through which Maniu was kept in contact with the Allies. Georgescu's network proved to be an invaluable asset, by managing to supply the British with the German plans to invade the USSR gathered from the German High Command in Bucharest in April 1941. In the summer of 1941, the network was discovered by the German Abwehr and its members were arrested. Although imprisoned at Malmaison, Georgescu was allowed to secretly maintain his contacts with the SOE by Eugen Cristescu, the head of the Romanian Secret Intelligence Service (SSI), who obtained permission from Marshal Ion Antonescu.

=== The "Ranji" mission ===
To ensure better collaboration between Maniu and the Foreign Office, an SOE mission was dispatched to Romania in 1943 after approval was given by the Soviet Union. The team consisting of Captain Thomas Charles David Russell of the Scots Guards and radioman Nicolae Țurcanu was dropped into Yugoslavia on the night of 15/16 June and made its way to Romania with the help of the Serb Chetniks. Once they reached Romania, the two continued only with one Serbian-Romanian Chetnik and settled in a hut in the woods near Vârciorova.

Under the code name "Reginald", Țurcanu operated the radio set from the house of Ion Pitulescu, a member of the National Peasants' Party in Vârciorova, while the latter went to Bucharest to make contact with Maniu. While Țurcanu was trying to establish radio transmission from Pitulescu's house, Russell was murdered under mysterious circumstances on the night of 4 September. The news of his death was relayed to the SOE by Țurcanu on 20 September. Eventually, "Reginald" reached Bucharest where the radio set was used from the house of a former SOE collaborator to maintain regular contact between Maniu and the British until 14 July 1944, when it was discovered by German radio geometry and Țurcanu was arrested. After this event, the "Reginald" radio was used one more time on 26 August, when a request for an Allied air raid against the Germans in Otopeni and Băneasa was sent to Cairo by Georgescu and Țurcanu.

== The "Autonomous" mission ==
Although "Ranji" succeeded in delivering the radio equipment and operator through which contact was kept with Maniu and Georgescu, a second SOE mission to Romania was also in the works since the spring of 1943. Since direct British contact failed to be achieved in the previous attempt, the new mission, code-named "Autonomous", was put into motion. Led directly by Lieutenant Colonel de Chastelain, together with Ivor Porter, a former English lecturer at the University of Bucharest, and Captain Silviu Mețianu, a Romanian sabotage expert recruited by the SOE in London, preparations began in November 1943.

=== Operation aims and outcome ===
The aim of the operation was primarily political:

- To persuade Romanian politicians, especially Iuliu Maniu, the leader of the National Peasants' Party, to negotiate an armistice with the Allied Powers and to oversee the operational details of an eventual coup to overthrow Antonescu's regime.
- In case they were captured by authorities loyal to the Antonescu government, to convince the Romanian authorities during their interrogation, that the allies were preparing to land in the Balkans, hoping that this would induce a concentration of German troops to the east, reducing their firepower in Normandy.

On 22 November 1943, de Chastelain made his first attempt to jump into Romania alone. Flying in a Liberator bomber of an RAF squadron from Tocra in Libya, no signals were spotted in the drop zone so the aircraft had to turn back, managing to reach Brindisi in Italy due to fuel shortage. A second attempt with both de Chastelain and Porter happened on 5 December, resulting in a similar outcome.

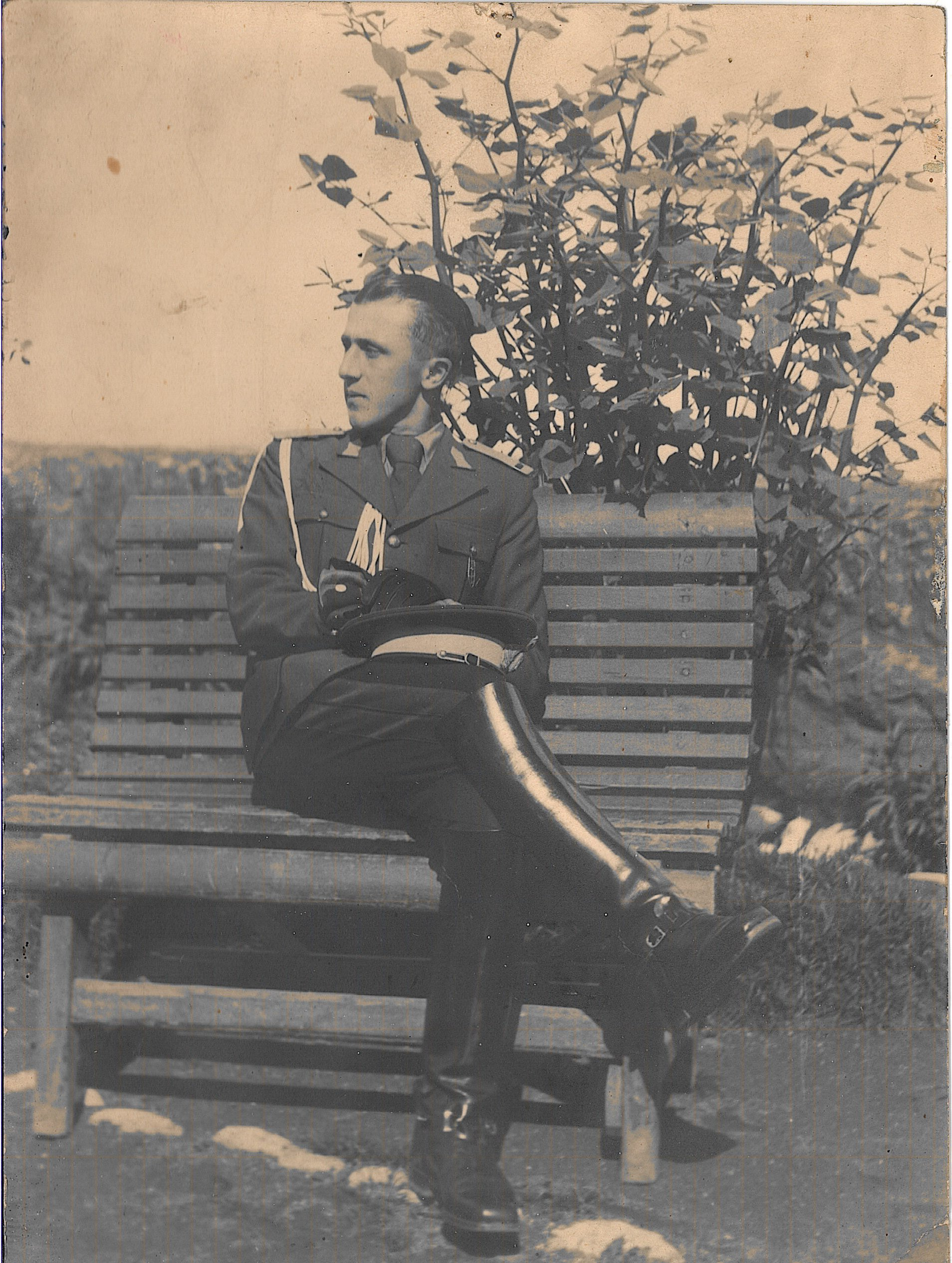
Young lieutenant Constantin C. Roșescu (later a lieutenant-colonel), one of the Romanian officers that took care of the British prisoners. (Note: His portrait, including his habit of smoking using a cigarette holder, is described in Porter's book (the name is misspelled "Rocescu"))

The third attempt happened in the night of 22 December 1943, and all three agents parachuted into thick fog and some distance away from the target. They hid in the woods near their landing location until daybreak when they set out to find the car that would take them to Bucharest. They were however captured by Romanian gendarmerie near the locality of Plosca, Teleorman County as their aircraft was discovered by radar on the night of the drop. Two German soldiers had previously tried to reach the party but were turned away by the local officials. They were held as well-treated prisoners of war at the Gendarmerie headquarters in Bucharest under the care of General Constantin Tobescu, Major Constantin C. Roșescu and of Major Eugen Dobrogeanu. Churchill promptly sent a message to Marshal Ion Antonescu warning him that should the British prisoners fall into German hands he would be held personally responsible. The Romanian leader had been told that de Chastelain had information which in German hands could change the outcome of the war.

After reaching Bucharest, de Chastelain and Porter informed Antonescu of the British attitude towards Romania and also advised him through generals Tobescu and Vasiliu that he should send authorized envoys to negotiate armistice terms with the three Allies. The Conducător eventually sent Prince Barbu Știrbey to Cairo for this purpose. During their internment, the three SOE agents were interrogated several times by Romanian officials. The Germans also requested to interrogate the SOE mission, though they were only allowed to do so twice.

While kept in custody in Bucharest, the Autonomous mission facilitated the contact between the British and both Antonescu and Maniu. On 19 March 1944, while Marshal Antonescu was called to Berlin following the German invasion of Hungary, Deputy Prime Minister Mihai Antonescu sent a message to the British asking what help the Allies could offer Romania. He soon received a response on 25 March from General Henry Maitland Wilson, the Supreme Allied Commander in the Mediterranean Theatre, that Romania must cease all resistance to the Red Army, and Antonescu could rely on Allied air support. Likewise, Maniu sent a similar message on 20 March and received a similar reply from Maitland Wilson.

Upon returning to Romania, Marshal Antonescu responded to Wilson's message that Romania could not surrender "without some serious guarantee of her future". Despite advising the Marshal to rephrase his message in a more practical tone, de Chastelain was requested to send the message as it was on the Autonomous radio set. The radio transmission was however delayed to a later date by the arrival of a German interrogation mission and by the time the radio set could be used again, it was discovered that the required crystals for the Cairo wavelength were missing from the Gendarmerie headquarters.

On 13 April 1944, the armistice terms for Romania were received by de Chastelain via the "Reginald" radio set. These were forwarded to Antonescu but were strongly rejected. On the opposition side, Maniu instead sent Constantin Vișoianu together with Alexandru Racotta, Radu Hurmuzescu, and Max Auschnitt to Cairo on a mission to continue the peace negotiations. On 22 August, de Chastelain was informed of the successful Soviet offensive and that Mihai Antonescu had decided to act independently of the Marshal, requesting to urgently fly together with de Chastelain to Cairo to negotiate the terms with the Allies. De Chastelain agreed, but not before he drafted several conditions: that he must contact Maniu first, re-establish radio contact with Cairo, and that an officer who could provide details on the German battle orders needed to accompany them. Before the British officer could hand over the conditions to Minister Antonescu on 23 August, the coup against the Antonescu government had started.

On 23 August 1944, the young King Michael of Romania, at considerable personal risk, carried out his well-prepared coup d'état which took Hitler completely by surprise and so Romania entered the war against the Axis. The British prisoners were released and that evening the King arranged for de Chastelain to fly to Istanbul from where he could go to Cairo and London to report. Mețianu stayed on for a time and then returned to England. Porter remained to maintain a radio link with SOE Headquarters until the British mission arrived. He later worked at the Legation and in 1948 returned to London to the Foreign Office.

== Aftermath ==
After the start of the Cold War, Soviet authorities alleged that de Chastelain was keeping contact with Maniu, the leader of the National Peasants' Party; the latter had opposed both Antonescu's regime and the Soviet occupation of Romania. During Maniu's trial for treason in 1947, the Minister of the Interior, Teohari Georgescu, was handed a report which indicated Maniu's alleged contacts with de Chastelain as proof that the politician was a British spy.

Reportedly, Cpt. Meţianu visited Romania at least once during the Cold War and visited major Roșescu at home.

In 1989, Porter's book Operation Autonomous: With SOE In Wartime Romania was published by Chatto and Windus. The translation of this book in Romanian was published by Humanitas in 1991.

In 2011, Porter attended the festivities of the Royal Jubilee, held in Bucharest, on the occasion of King Michael's 90th anniversary.

== See also ==
- Romanian resistance movement during World War II
- Western Allied campaign in Romania

== Bibliography ==
- Deletant, Dennis (2016). British Clandestine Activities in Romania during the Second World War. London: Palgrave Macmillan. ISBN 9781349555093.
- Duțu, Alesandru; Dobre, Florica; Șiperco, Andrei (March 1997). "Pagini dintr-o istorie nescrisă: 1941–1945. Prizonieri de război în România"". Magazin Istoric (in Romanian). Archived from the original on 11 February 2006.
- Pippidi, Aurel (2006). "Regele și țara". Revista 22 (in Romanian). Archived from the original on 8 October 2007.
- Porter, Ivor (1989). Operation Autonomous: With SOE In Wartime Romania. Chatto and Windus.
- Racovitză, Alexandru (2007). "Mărturii despre Operațiunea Autonomous". Clopotul Bucovinei (in Romanian). Vol. 16, no. 42.
