= Florică Ică Calotă =

Romanian politician (born 1964)

Member of the Chamber of Deputies
- Incumbent
- Assumed office 19 December 2012
- Constituency: Teleorman

Personal details
- Born: 25 April 1964 (age 62) Plosca, Romanian People's Republic
- Party: DREPT (since 2024)
- Other political affiliations: PNL (1991–2014, 2019–2023); ALDE (2014–2019); PRO (2019); AUR (2023–2024)
- Education: University of Galați

Florică Ică Calotă (born 25 April 1964) is a Romanian politician of the Justice and Respect in Europe for All Party. Since 2012, he has been a member of the Chamber of Deputies. From 2008 to 2012, he served as deputy mayor of Alexandria.

He was born in Plosca, Teleorman County, and graduated from the Faculty of Food Science and Engineering of University of Galați.

Calotă joined the National Liberal Party in 1991, and served as vice president of its Teleorman County branch. He was a member of the Alliance of Liberals and Democrats from 2014 to 2019, and a member of PRO Romania for one month in 2019. He returned to the National Liberal Party in 2019, and switched to the Alliance for the Union of Romanians in 2023. Since 2024, he has been a member of the Justice and Respect in Europe for All Party.
