= Marion Elizabeth (Walsh) de Chastelain =

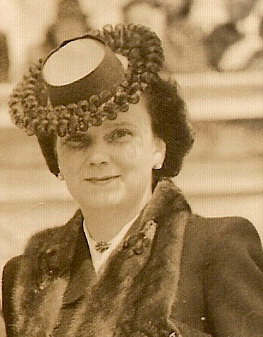
Marion de Chastelain in 1945

Marion Elizabeth (Walsh) de Chastelain was an American-born Canadian who worked as an agent for the British Secret Intelligence Service during World War II, passing on information from German-controlled Vichy French embassy to the Allies.

De Chatelain was born in Freehold, New Jersey, USA, on 24 May 1910. The daughter of a businessman working for Standard Oil of New Jersey in Romania, she was educated in Switzerland and at the Sorbonne, from where she graduated with a degree in international law at the age of 21.

A linguist, she married Alfred George Gardyne de Chastelain in Bucharest in the early 1930s and they had two children, Jacqueline, born in 1936 and John, born in 1937, who would become a well-known general in the Canadian Forces. Marion knew how to speak 7 languages, which helped her job as a spy become easier.

At the outbreak of war between Great Britain and Germany in 1939, she took her children to stay with relatives in England and returned to Romania. In 1940 she returned to England and took the children by sea to live with her parents in New York, USA. There she was recruited to work for Canadian Sir William Stephenson (to whom Winston Churchill had given the codename "INTREPID"), travelling regularly to Washington, D.C. to debrief agents working on behalf of the allies for Stephenson. Working with Amy Elizabeth Thorpe, De Chastelain was able to establish covert relationships between British and American intelligence agencies.

In 1943, two years after the entry of the USA into the war following Pearl Harbor, and the consequent closure of Axis embassies in Washington, her work for Stephenson was rendered less important and arrangements were made for her to take up a position with the Secret Intelligence Service (SIS — later MI6) in England. Accordingly, she sailed from Halifax, Nova Scotia with her children to Liverpool, and then by rail to London, where she learnt that her husband had been captured in Romania.

Sending her children to boarding school in the north of England to avoid the bombing, she remained in London working with SIS until the war's end and her husband's return. After the war she moved to Canada with her family and eventually to Australia, with her husband. When he died shortly after their return to Canada from Australia, she worked for Westburne International Industries Oil Division in Edmonton, Alberta, as the Executive Assistant to the President, until her retirement in her seventies.

She then lived with her daughter Jacqueline in Canmore, Alberta, until her death on 17 January 2000, shortly before her 90th birthday, her fifth great-grandchild's birth and daughters birthday.

The story of her wartime activities was included in the book series "The Canadians: Biography of a Nation", edited by Patrick Watson. It was also made into a documentary program by History Television, entitled "Family Secrets: Marion de Chastelain".
