= Alfred Gardyne de Chastelain =

British soldier and businessman

Alfred George Gardyne de Chastelain, DSO, OBE
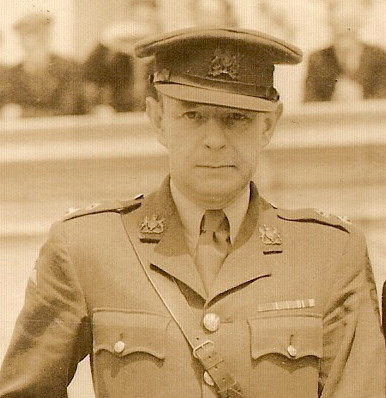
- Alfred Gardyne de Chastelain in 1945
- Born: February 1906; London, England
- Died: 1974; Calgary, Alberta, Canada
- Military career
- Allegiance: United Kingdom
- Branch: British Army
- Service years: World War II
- Rank: Lieutenant-Colonel
- Units: Artists' Rifles, Special Operations Executive
- Awards: DSO, OBE

Alfred George Gardyne de Chastelain, DSO, OBE (1906–1974) was a British-Canadian businessman, soldier, and secret agent, noted for his actions during World War II. He was the father of Canadian General John de Chastelain.

== Early life and stay in Romania ==
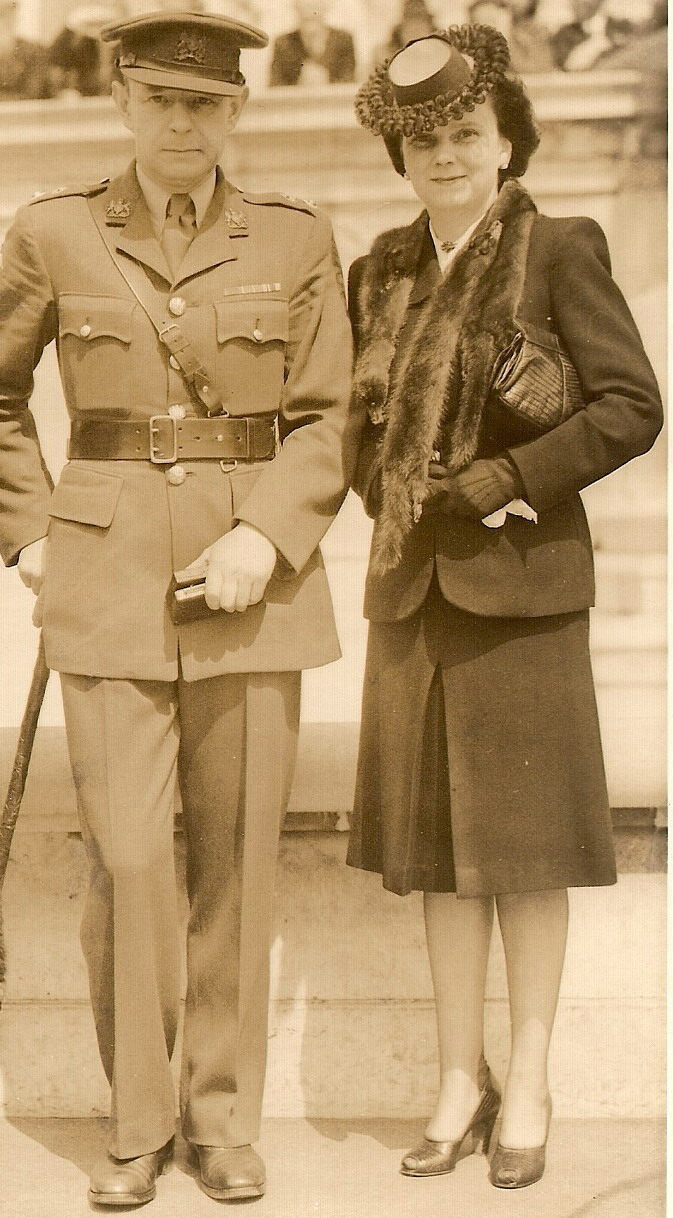
Mr and Mrs de Chastelain in 1945

Born in London in February 1906, of Anglo-Scottish parents and of Huguenot background, he was educated in Scotland and the University of London, from which he received a First class degree in Engineering. On graduation, he moved to the Kingdom of Romania and worked for Unirea (a British Petroleum branch) in Bucharest, rising to a managerial position towards the end of the 1930s. While in Bucharest, he married Marion Elizabeth Walsh, the daughter of Jack Walsh, an American accountant with Standard Oil of New Jersey in Romania.

== Wartime activities with the SOE ==
On the outbreak of war with Nazi Germany, de Chastelain was commissioned into the Artists' Rifles and became a member of Special Operations Executive (SOE), with which organisation he conducted sabotage operations in the Balkans and served in the North African campaign.

In late 1943, with the rank of lieutenant-colonel, he led a team of two other SOE members (Ivor Porter and Silviu Meţianu) by parachute into Romania (Operation Autonomous), to test the possibility of the country's surrender to the Allies as the Axis was losing battles on the Eastern Front (see Romania during World War II). Captured by the Romanian Gendarmerie soon after their landing near Plosca, Teleorman County, he and his team were taken into custody as prisoners of war and held in a Bucharest apartment.

They were all released in August 1944, when Conducător Ion Antonescu was overthrown and King Michael I assumed full powers (see King Michael's Coup). Decorated, de Chastelain was demobilised after the war, joining a unit of the Special Air Service in the Territorial Army.

== Life in the post-war era ==
After the start of the Cold War, Soviet authorities alleged that he was keeping contacts with Iuliu Maniu, the leader of the National Peasants' Party; the latter had opposed both Antonescu's regime and the Soviet occupation of Romania. During Maniu's trial for treason (1947), the Minister of the Interior, Teohari Georgescu, was handed a report which indicated Maniu's alleged contacts with de Chastelain as proof that the politician was a British spy.

Alongside a group of partners, de Chastelain started "Griffin Enterprises" (1945), a business centered in London and Kent, dealing in film processing, import and exports and other activities. In 1954, he left that business to accept a post as Vice-President of the Canadian branch of an American oilwell drilling and services company, H. J. Eastman, in Calgary, Alberta.

Living for several years in Canada and then in Australia, he returned to Canada in the early 1970s and died in Calgary at the age of 68.

A book giving an account of the SOE Operation in Romania was written by one member of the team, Ivor Porter, later a British Ambassador (Operation Autonomous: With SOE in Wartime Rumania, Chatto and Windus, 1989).

He was a founding member of the Special Forces Club in Knightsbridge, and of the "Food and Wine Society" in Calgary.
