= Tămădău affair =

1947 Romanian political scandal

The Tămădău affair (Romanian: Afacerea Tămădău, Înscenarea de la Tămădău – "the Tămădău frameup" – or Fuga de la Tămădău – "the Tămădău flight") was an incident that took place in Romania in July 1947. It was the source of a political scandal and show trial.

It was provoked when an important number of National Peasants' Party (PNȚ) leaders, including Party Vice-President Ion Mihalache, had been offered a chance to flee Romania, where the Communist Party (PCR), the main force in the Petru Groza government, already had a tight grip on power with backing from the Soviet Union (see Soviet occupation of Romania). The affair signalled some of the first official measures taken against opposition parties as a step leading to the proclamation of a people's republic at the end of that year (see Socialist Republic of Romania).

== Background ==
The PCR victory in the 1946 general election was achieved mostly through the implementation of widespread electoral fraud and was followed by the first attempts at anti-communist resistance, including the creation of a "military circle", led by Mihalache.

As the main adversary of Stalinism and a committed supporter of the Western Allies, the PNȚ was the principal target for PCR hostility. According to the journalist Victor Frunză, the PNȚ and the National Liberal Party were already targeted for having backed attempts during World War II by Conducător Marshal Ion Antonescu to sign a separate peace with the Allies (see Romania during World War II). In late October 1946, the PNȚ entered into open conflict with the authorities. The first volley was to send a secret report to the Secretary-General of the United Nations that was heavily critical of governmental policies.

The Communist press alleged that the National Peasants' Party had been organising a wide network of armed resistance (groups cited in that context may have indeed existed as early as 1947 and were probably merged into the resistance movement in the 1950s). Meanwhile, the Communists press applauded the dissidence of various PNȚ leaders such as Anton Alexandrescu, Nicolae L. Lupu, and Victor Eftimiu.

== Events ==
Several details on the affair are still unclear. The offer to flee Romania was quickly discovered, as the government declared, or, as claimed by the journalist Victor Frunză, had already been investigated and, in the hope of discrediting the opposition party, partly facilitated by agents of Interior Minister Teohari Georgescu. In October 1947, PNȚ President Iuliu Maniu declared:

The idea for Mr. Mihalache and a few friends to go abroad was an older one and I had decided at some point to leave myself, in case Mr. Mihalache would not allow himself to leave. This discussion between us lasted for a while, and we were thinking how we could find a means of locomotion. When the question was being debated between the two of us with no one else aware of it, Dr. Emil Hațieganu came to see me. [...] He said: I have two aviators who have a plane at their disposal and have let me know that they have secured 3–4 seats, as they are to leave on an official military mission to Istanbul. I said that I was satisfied by the offer and that I would designate 3–4 persons to leave.

Early on the morning of July 14, 1947, at the Tămădău airfield (located 46 km (29 mi) from Bucharest), Siguranța Statului and armed soldiers arrested a number of prominent PNȚ politicians, including Mihalache, Nicolae Penescu, Ilie Lazăr, Nicolae Carandino, Dumitru, and Eugen Borcea, all of whom were waiting for airplanes to transport them out of the country. A photoreporter was also present to provide maximum exposure to the flight attempt.

The scandal was centred on the charge of treason ("of the people's interests"), which was provoked by the allegation that those arrested had attempted to establish a government in exile. Victor Frunză argued that "in democratic states" citizens should have an "unconditional right to a passport" to leave the country whenever they want and therefore the accusations of illegal border crossing, flight, and treason should not have been brought. Calls for a trial of the entire party were voiced by the Communist press (notably by Silviu Brucan), and Maniu himself, although not present at Tămădău, was argued to have planned the escape. Arrested while under treatment in a sanatorium, Maniu later admitted to the fact and indicated that he was prepared to assume complete responsibility:

[After Hațieganu's offer] I spoke to Mr. Mihalache, I specifically asked him to make use of this opportunity and he accepted. Indeed, the moral and political responsibility for the departure of Mr. Mihalache and our friends is mine.

He denied, however, any subversive goal:

The purpose as designed by me was that, through going abroad, they were to inform foreign countries of the situation in Romania.

== Outcome ==
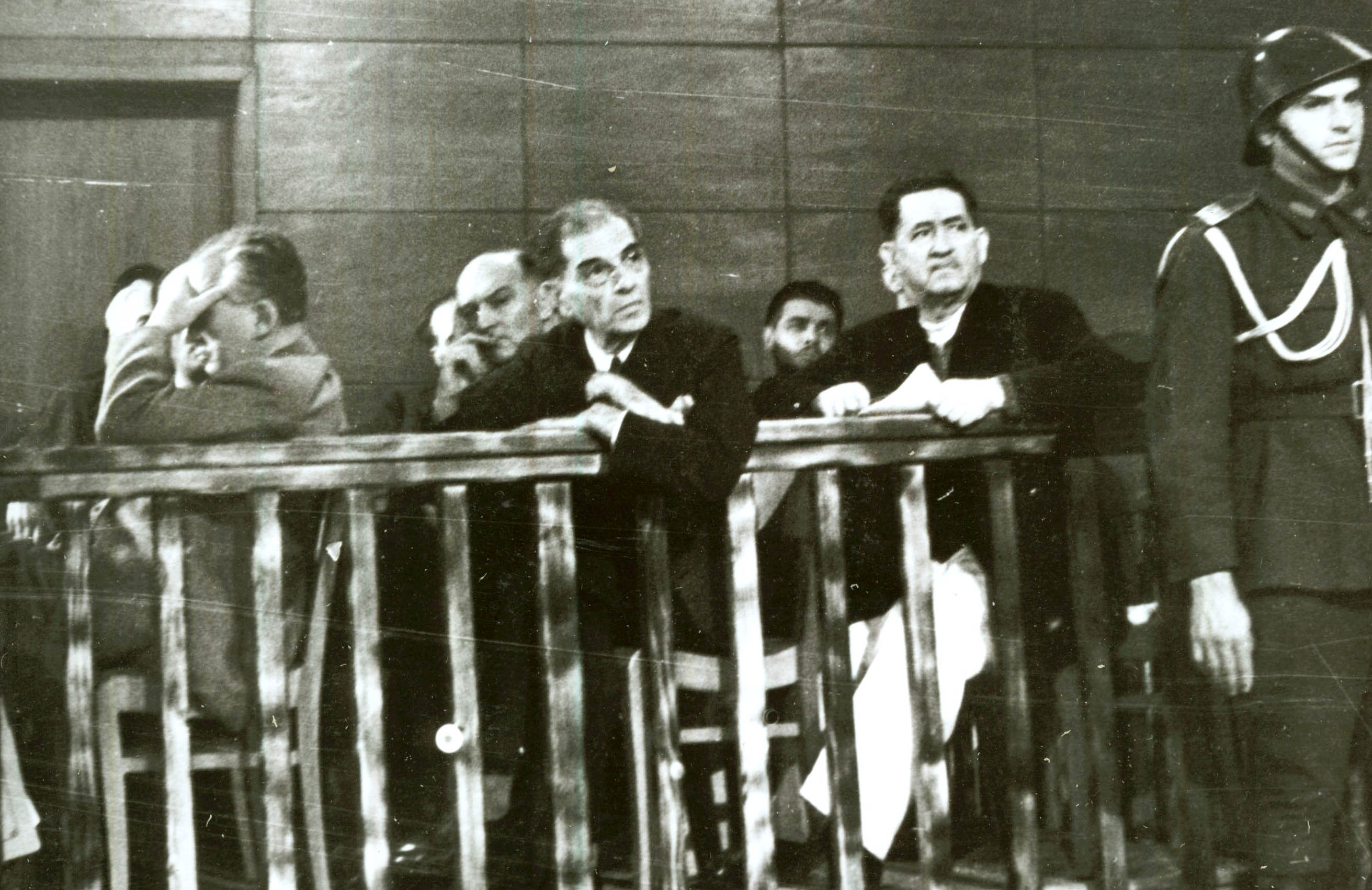
Nicolae Penescu, Ștefan Stoika, and Ion Mihalache at the 1947 trial of the PNȚ leadership

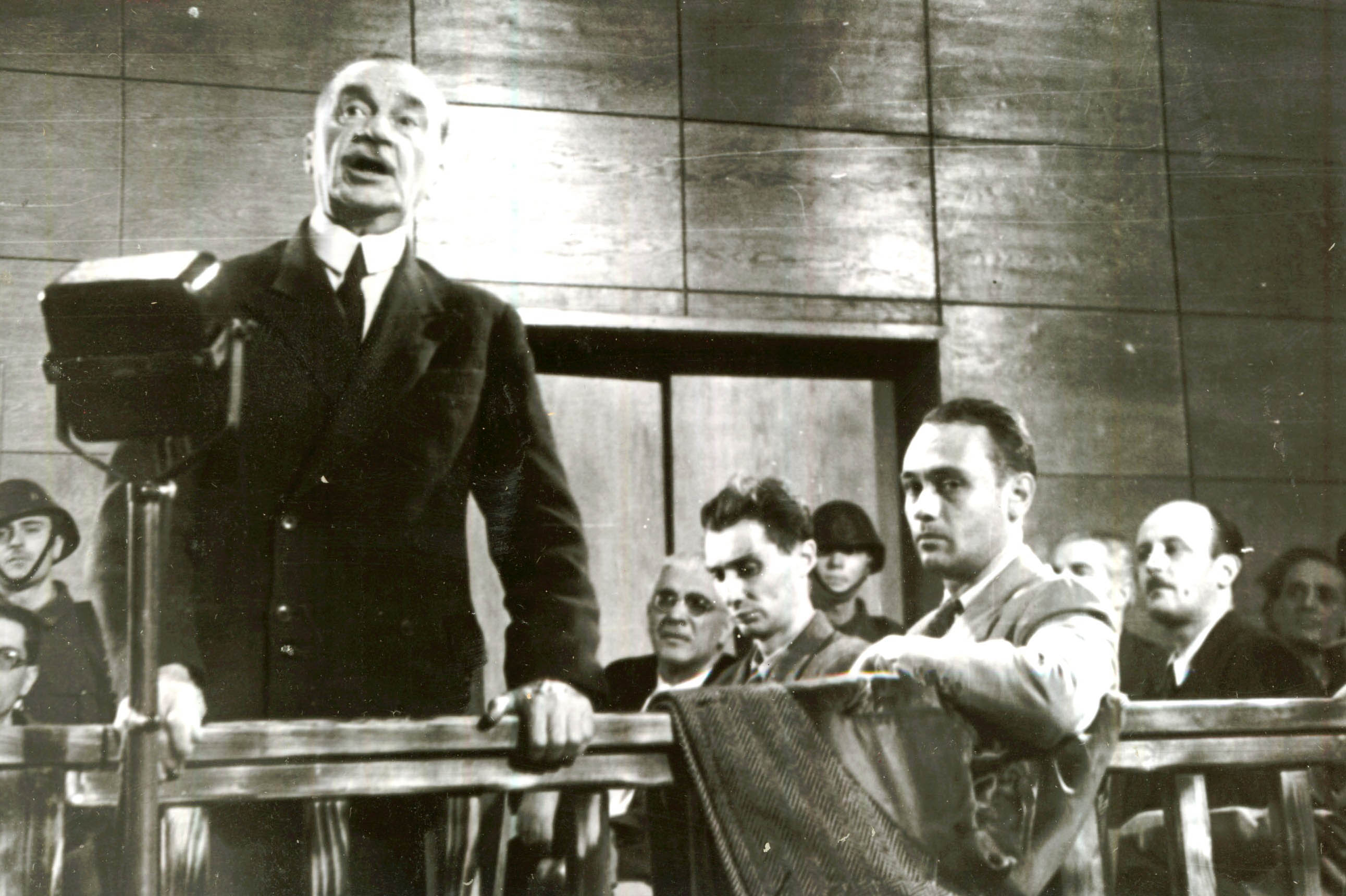
Iuliu Maniu's last appeal at the trial, November 11, 1947

Later the same day (July 14, 1947), authorities stormed into the PNȚ headquarters and confiscated all documents held in the archive, a move followed by other searches for documents in various locations. On July 19, the Assembly of Deputies of Romania voted to outlaw the party press (including Dreptatea), and to lift the parliamentary immunity of PNȚ deputies. The entire party leadership was arrested on the same day, and the party was banned on July 30 on the basis of a report filed by Teohari Georgescu. In parallel, Soviet authorities handed Georgescu the handwritten testimony of a former Abwehr agent, Alfred Petermann, who alleged that Maniu had worked as an agent for the British Secret Intelligence Service during the war and kept contact with Alfred Gardyne de Chastelain.

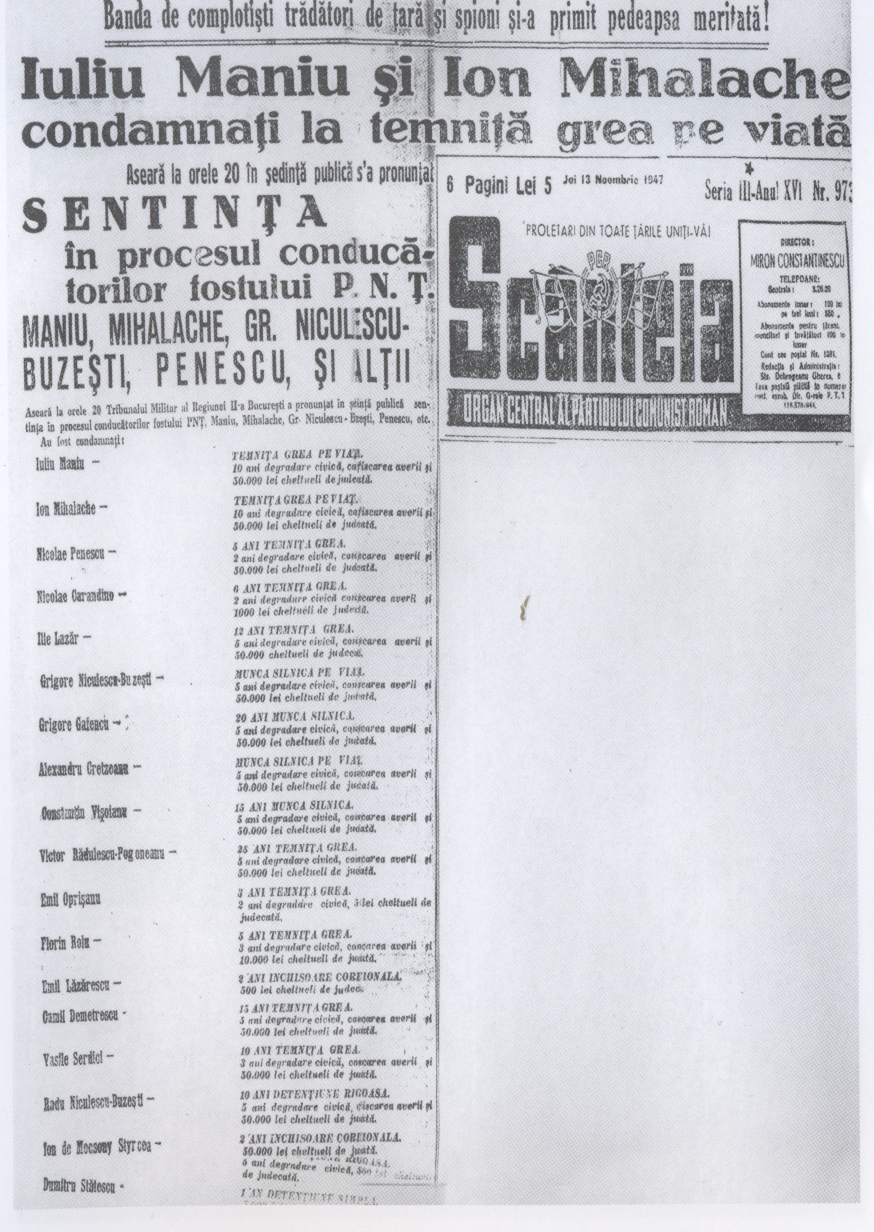
The sentence at the trial of the PNȚ leaders, published in Scânteia on November 13, 1947

The regular sentence for illegally attempting to leave the country was three to six months, but all those involved and those judged to have been involved were sentenced to harsh penal labour sentences. In particular, Maniu and Mihalache were sentenced to life imprisonment for high treason. Maniu died in Sighet Prison in 1953 and Mihalache in Râmnicu Sărat Prison ten years later. Most other important party activists were sentenced in the following years. Corneliu Coposu, who was to lead the re-established party after the Romanian Revolution of 1989, was also arrested and imprisoned in connection with the Tămădău Affair.

Constantin Titel Petrescu, the leader of a splinter group of the Social Democratic Party, which had refused cooperation with the Communists, also came up during the trial and was later tried and convicted. The diplomat Neagu Djuvara, who was present at the Romanian Legation in Sweden, was mentioned in one of the testimonies at the trial and opted not to return to his country.

The episode was soon after used against Romanian Foreign Minister Gheorghe Tătărescu, the leader of the National Liberal Party-Tătărescu (which was aligned with the Communists but had criticised several of their policies). He was attacked by the PCR newspaper Scînteia for having allegedly failed to act against a pro-Maniu conspiracy inside his ministry, was unceremoniously demoted and was replaced by the Communist activist Ana Pauker.

== Sources ==
- Adrian Cioroianu, Pe umerii lui Marx. O introducere în istoria comunismului românesc ("On the Shoulders of Marx. An Incursion into the History of Romanian Communism"), Editura Curtea Veche, Bucharest, 2005. ISBN 9736691756
- Victor Frunză, Istoria stalinismului în România ("The History of Stalinism in Romania"), Humanitas, Bucharest, 1990
- (in Romanian) Ioan Lăcustă, "În București, acum 50 ani" ("In Bucharest, 50 Years Ago"), in Magazin Istoric, October 1997
- Tatiana Pokivailova, Ioan Chiper, "Procesul Maniu în arhivele de la Moscova" ("The Maniu Trial in the Moscow Archives"), in Magazin Istoric, April 2002
- (in Romanian) Toma Roman Jr., "«Politicește, Ion Antonescu habar n-avea ce face»" ("«Politically, Ion Antonescu Had No Idea of What He Was Doing»"), interview with Neagu Djuvara, in Plai cu Boi, No.11
- (in Romanian) Cristina Vohn, "Lovitura de teatru – Înscenarea de la Tămădău" ("Theater Coup – The Tămădău Frameup"), in Jurnalul Național, August 16, 2006
