= Constantin Tobescu =

Romanian general

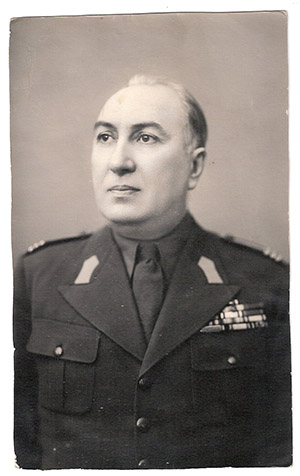
Constantin Tobescu

Constantin Tobescu (January 28, 1893 – December 2, 1951) was a Romanian general of the Romanian Gendarmerie (Jandarmeria) during World War II, deserter during the King Michael's Coup of August 23, 1944, one of the principal executors of Ion Antonescu's racial purity policies.

== Youth and studies ==
Constantin Tobescu was born in 1893 in the village of Comani, Olt County, Kingdom of Romania. In 1911, after completing 7 years of high school, Tobescu enrolled in the Military School for Infantry, which he completed in 1913, being promoted 2nd lieutenant. He immediately took part in the operations of the Second Balkan War.

== The First World War ==
In 1916, a short time after he had been promoted to the rank of lieutenant, Romania entered World War I on the side of the Allies. He was in command of a Company when he was wounded on September 4, 1916, but returned to the front line in December of the same year. In 1917 he was promoted captain and was awarded the Order of the Crown with swords.

== Career in the Romanian Gendarmerie ==
At the end of the war, on December 19, 1918, Constantin Tobescu was transferred to the Gendarmerie and appointed commander of the company of Romanați County. In 1920 he received special training in gendarmerie procedures, following which he was permanently transferred to the Gendarmes' Corps and promoted major.

In 1929, the Romanian Gendarmerie was reorganized and Tobescu moved to the Gendarmerie Inspectorate in Bucharest. During the 1930s he held various responsibilities, being also in charge of international contacts with the Gendarmerie corps of friendly nations. He was promoted lieutenant-colonel in 1932 and colonel in 1938.

On September 4, 1940, when general Ion Antonescu took power, Tobescu was appointed to the General Inspectorate of the Gendarmerie. However, because of his conflict with the legionnaires of the right-wing Iron Guard, he resigned on December 31, 1940 and took refuge in Yugoslavia, returning to Romania on January 24, 1941, after the quelling of the Legionnaires' rebellion.

== World War II ==
On June 22, 1941, when Romania entered World War II on the side of the Axis, Tobescu was recalled to active duty. His responsibilities were focused on the execution — as one of the principal executors — of Antonescu's racial purity policies: deportation to Transnistria of 25,000 of Romanian Romani people (11,000 deaths, most of them children), massacres (1941 Odessa massacre), concentration camps for members of the Romanian Jewish community, etc. For example, in October 1941, the Romanian authorities established a detention camp in Vapniarka. One thousand Jews were brought to the site that month, mostly from the city of Odessa. Some two hundred died in a typhus epidemic; the others were taken out of the camp in two batches, guarded by soldiers of the Romanian Gendarmerie, and shot to death.

While his initiatives to prevent sabotage were mostly successful, he is also remembered for the special treatment he gave American and British paratroopers that were captured in Romania. He organized special camps where they were treated as prisoners of war, refusing to hand them over to the Germans, or even to allow them to be interrogated by the German authorities.

He was involved in Operation Autonomous when a special group of 3 British secret agents were parachuted in Romania in 1943. In order to protect them, he made arrangements to have them kept in an apartment in the building of the Romanian Gendarmerie, under his own special protection, putting his subordinate, lieutenant-colonel Constantin C. Roșescu (then a Major) in charge as special liaison agent. The two officers conveyed the information which the agents had brought to their destination and concealed their presence from the Germans. The agents were released immediately after August 23, 1944, when Romania switched sides (see 1944 Romanian coup d'état).

== The trial ==
Tobescu was judged by the Bucharest Military Tribunal on January 19, 1949, for war crimes and desertion in time of war and found guilty of the charges, convicted to 5 years detention and stripped of all military ranks and honours for 5 years. After the appeal, the conviction was increased to 10 years. He died in the Târgu Ocna Prison in 1951.

== Decorations and awards ==
- Order of the Crown (Romania)
  - Knight rank with swords, 3 July 1918
  - Officer rank, 23 January 1933
  - Commander rank, 1942
- Order of the Star of Romania
  - Knight rank, 13 January 1927
  - Officer rank, 1940
- Commemorative Cross of the War 1916-1919
- World War I Victory Medal
- Medal for 25 Years of Service
- Medical Merit Cross
- Commander of the Order of Military Merit (Bulgaria)
- King Carol I Centennial Medal
- Order of Agricultural Merit
