= Plosca =

- Commune
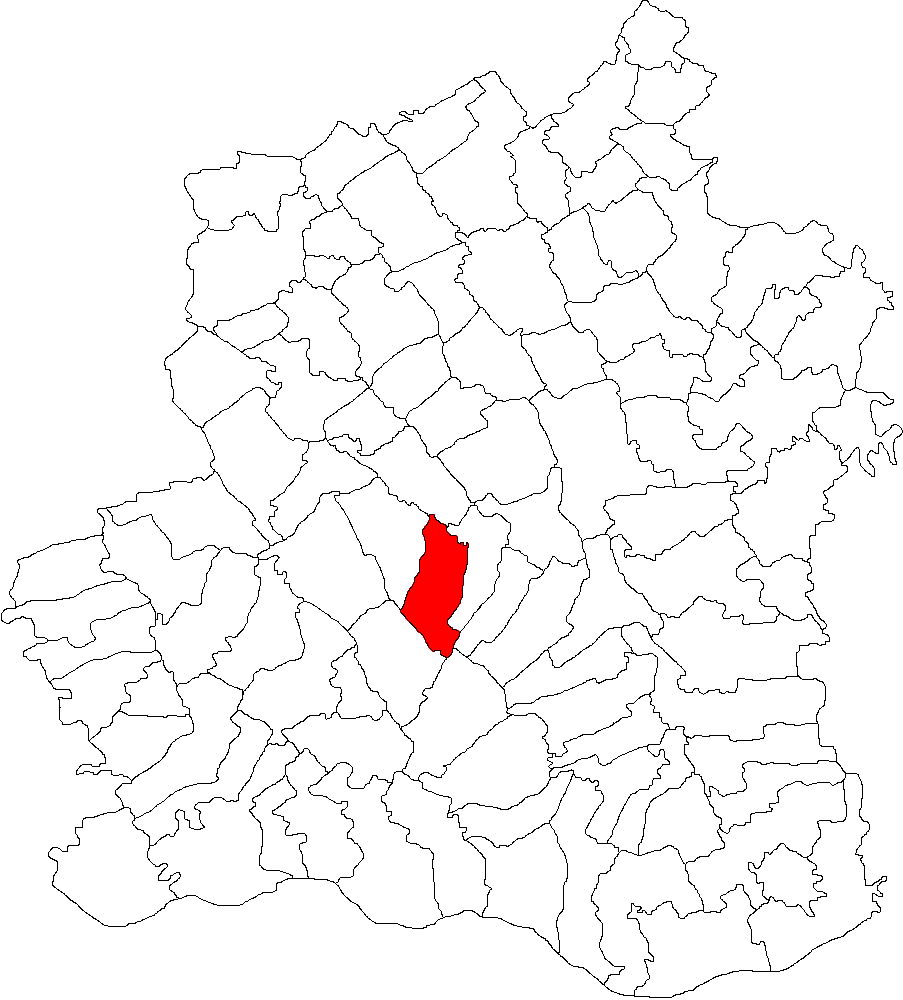
- Location in Teleorman County

- Location in Romania
- Coordinates: 44°02′N 25°07′E
- Country: Romania
- County: Teleorman

Government
  - Mayor (2020–2024): Marius-Cosmin Șerban (PSD)
- Area: 50.48 km^{2} (19.49 sq mi)
- Elevation: 66 m (217 ft)
- Population (2021-12-01): 5,015
  - Density: 99.35/km^{2} (257.3/sq mi)
- Time zone: UTC+02:00 (EET)
  - Summer (DST): UTC+03:00 (EEST)
- Postal code: 147265
- Area code: +(40) 247
- Vehicle reg.: TR
- Website: comunaplosca.ro

Plosca is a commune in Teleorman County, Muntenia, Romania. It is composed of a single village, Plosca.

== Name ==
The name is probably derived from a container used for water and beverages (ploscă is the Romanian word for canteen or bota bag).

== History ==
In 1943, the three British SOE members of Operation Autonomous were arrested near Plosca by the Romanian Gendarmerie.

== Natives ==
- Florică Ică Calotă (born 1964), politician
- Liviu Vasilică (1950–2004), folk music singer
