= Ivor Porter =

British ambassador and author

Ivor Forsyth Porter CMG, OBE (12 November 1913 – 29 May 2012) was a British ambassador and author.

== Education ==
Porter was brought up in the Lake District and educated at Barrow-in-Furness Grammar School and Leeds University where he studied English.

== Special Operations Executive ==
In 1939, Porter was sent to Bucharest, Romania on an academic post with the British Council to teach English at the University of Bucharest. In 1940 he was transferred to the Legation, and remained there until it was withdrawn from Romania on 12 February 1941.

On 1 March 1941, Porter was recruited by SOE, and was one of a covert three-man mission that was parachuted into Romania in December 1943 to instigate resistance against the Nazis at "any cost" (Operation Autonomous). The SOE agents were captured and held as prisoners-of-war until, on 23 August 1944, King Michael of Romania carried out his anti-German coup d'état. Porter met King Michael that night and remained in the country during the King's desperate efforts to prevent Soviet domination. In June 2008 he was awarded the Cross of the Royal House of Romania.

== Foreign Office ==
He joined the Foreign Office in May 1946 and served in London, Washington, D.C., the U.K. delegation to NATO, Cyprus, as U.K. representative to the Council of Europe, and India. He was ambassador in Senegal (with concurrent accreditation in Guinea, Mali, and Mauritania) and to the Arms Control Committee in Geneva.

== Author ==
Porter wrote two books after retirement: Operation Autonomous: With SOE in Wartime Romania (ISBN 9780701131708) and Michael of Romania: The King and the Country (ISBN 9780750938471). Operation Autonomous was short listed for the Time-Life/Pen Award for non-fiction. In 2005 he was made Commander of the Romanian order of "Meritul Cultural".

== Honours ==
=== National honours ===
- United Kingdom: Companion of the Order of St Michael and St George
- United Kingdom: Knight Officer of the Order of the British Empire

=== Foreign honours ===
- (Romania) Romanian Royal Family: 35th Knight of the Royal Decoration of the Cross of the Romanian Royal House

Diplomatic posts
Preceded by John Tahourdin	British Ambassador to Senegal; 1971–1973	Succeeded by Denzil Dunnett
