= List of communists imprisoned by the Kingdom of Romania =

This is a list of communists imprisoned by the Kingdom of Romania for their political activity during the era of repression of communists, when the Communist Party and communist ideology were banned. Many of these communists belonged to the "prison wing" of the Romanian Communist Party, as opposed to the "Muscovite wing", which resided in exile in Moscow.

Name	Period imprisoned	Notes
Gheorghe Apostol	1937–1944	
Olga Bancic	1930s	
Emil Bodnăraș	1935–1942	
Mihail Gheorghiu Bujor		
Scarlat Callimachi		
Nicolae Ceaușescu	1934	
Nicolae Ceaușescu	1936–December 1938	
Nicolae Ceaușescu	June 1940–1944	
Alecu Constantinescu	June 1921–1922	Dealul Spirii Trial
Miron Constantinescu		
Gheorghe Cristescu	June 1921–1922	Dealul Spirii Trial
Alexandru Dobrogeanu-Gherea	May 1922–June 1922	
Alexandru Drăghici	1936–1944	
Leonte Filipescu	June 1921–1922	Dealul Spirii Trial
Leonte Filipescu	June 1921–1922	assassinated in detention
Ștefan Foriș		
Gheorghe Gheorghiu-Dej	1933–1944	
Max Goldstein	December 1920–1924	died in prison
Vitali Holostenco	June 1921–1922	Dealul Spirii Trial
Aladar Imre	1924	
Aladar Imre	1926	
Aladar Imre	1927	
Aladar Imre	1928	
Elek Köblös	June 1921–1922	Dealul Spirii Trial
David Korner	June 1921–1922	Dealul Spirii Trial
Leon Lichtblau	June 1921–1922	Dealul Spirii Trial
Haia Lifșiț	1924	died in prison
Haia Lifșiț	1925	died in prison
Haia Lifșiț	1926	died in prison
Haia Lifșiț	1928–1929	died in prison
Ion Gheorghe Maurer		
Lucrețiu Pătrășcanu	June 1921–1922	Dealul Spirii Trial
Lucrețiu Pătrășcanu	1924	Dealul Spirii Trial
Marcel Pauker	June 1921–1922	Dealul Spirii Trial
Marcel Pauker	1923–1925	Dealul Spirii Trial
Marcel Pauker	1929	Dealul Spirii Trial
Ilie Pintilie	1936–1940	died in prison
Grigore Preoteasa		
Leonte Răutu	1931–1932	
Leonte Răutu	1932–1934	
Mihail Roller	1933	
Mihail Roller	1934	
Mihail Roller	1938	
Eugen Rozvan	June 1921–1922	Dealul Spirii Trial
Boris Stefanov	June 1921–1922	Dealul Spirii Trial
Chivu Stoica	1933–1943	
Pavel Tcacenco	June 1921–1922	Dealul Spirii Trial
Pavel Tcacenco	June 1921–1922	Killed in detention or while attempting to escape
Ion Vincze	1935	
Ion Vincze	1940–1944	
