= 1936 Craiova Trial =

Political trial in Romania

The 1936 Craiova Trial (Romanian: Procesul de la Craiova) was a political trial of some members of the Romanian Communist Party, part of the repression of communists in the Kingdom of Romania, judged by a military tribunal in Craiova.

== Arrests ==
During the night of July 12, 1935, police arrested Ana Pauker, a leader of the Romanian Communist Party, together with Șmil Marcovici and Dimitrie Ganev, members of the Communist Party, as well as the Kaufmans, who rented the house where the Communists' meetings took place. During the arrest, Pauker was shot in both legs. Further 14 communists were arrested in July 1935, during a meeting of the Union of Communist Youth. These included Andor Bernat, Vilma Kajeso, Donca Simo, Ady Ladislau, Samuel Krug, János Herbák, Ernest Schoen, Ștefan Csazsar, Ana Csazsar, Ștefan Naghi, Leizer Grünberg, Alexandru Drăghici, Liuba Chișinevschi, Alexandru Moghioroș, and Estera Radoșovețki.

== Charges ==
The main charges set by military prosecutor Colonel Petre Popescu-Cetate against the defendants were "activity against the Romanian state" and disturbing the peace.

== Trial ==
The trial was supposed to start in Bucharest on June 5, 1936. Large pro-communist rallies were organized in front of the War Council in Bucharest and, in some cases, the soldiers fired warning shot to calm the crowd. Due to this, the authorities decided to hold the trial inside a military engineering barracks 7 km (4.3 mi) away from Craiova, a city with little antifascist movement and the same place where the unionists involved in the Grivița Strike of 1933 were convicted in the 1934 Craiova Trial.

The train which took the accused to Craiova was defended by a hundred gendarmes. The barracks were surrounded by all the gendarmes in the Dolj County, while the barracks gate was defended by machine guns. The access to the hall was allowed only to officers and Siguranță agents, while the journalists were allowed only if they described the debates "in a reasonable way".

The defendants had a team of 20 lawyers from Bucharest led by Lucrețiu Pătrășcanu and Ion Gheorghe Maurer. Pătrășcanu was however required to leave the tribunal, as he had been in the meantime suspended by the Bucharest Bar due to his involvement in the Grivița Strike. Seven foreign lawyers advised the team of lawyers and they also helped to publicize the trial at a European level.

The Romania media and society followed the trial, with clashes between the communists, who organized rallies for the freeing of Ana Pauker and legionnaire students, who burned the Adevărul and Dimineața newspapers, which they saw as "communist rags".

The defense team tried to argue that the defendants were not against the Romanian state, but only that only against the way of organization of the country. They also argued that ideas should be fought with words, not through the justice system.

== Verdict ==
The three leaders of the Communist Party, including Ana Pauker, were found guilty and received the maximum penalty: 20 years in prison and a fine of 100,000 lei. The other communists received between 5 and 9 years in prison. The penalties totaled at 155 years in prison, 190 years of correctional interdictions and 5 million lei in fines. Pauker's authority within the Communist Party was enhanced by her behavior during the Craiova Trial; while being detained at Mislea and Dumbrăveni prisons until 1940, she became one of the leaders of the prison faction of the party.
