= Repression of communists in the Kingdom of Romania =

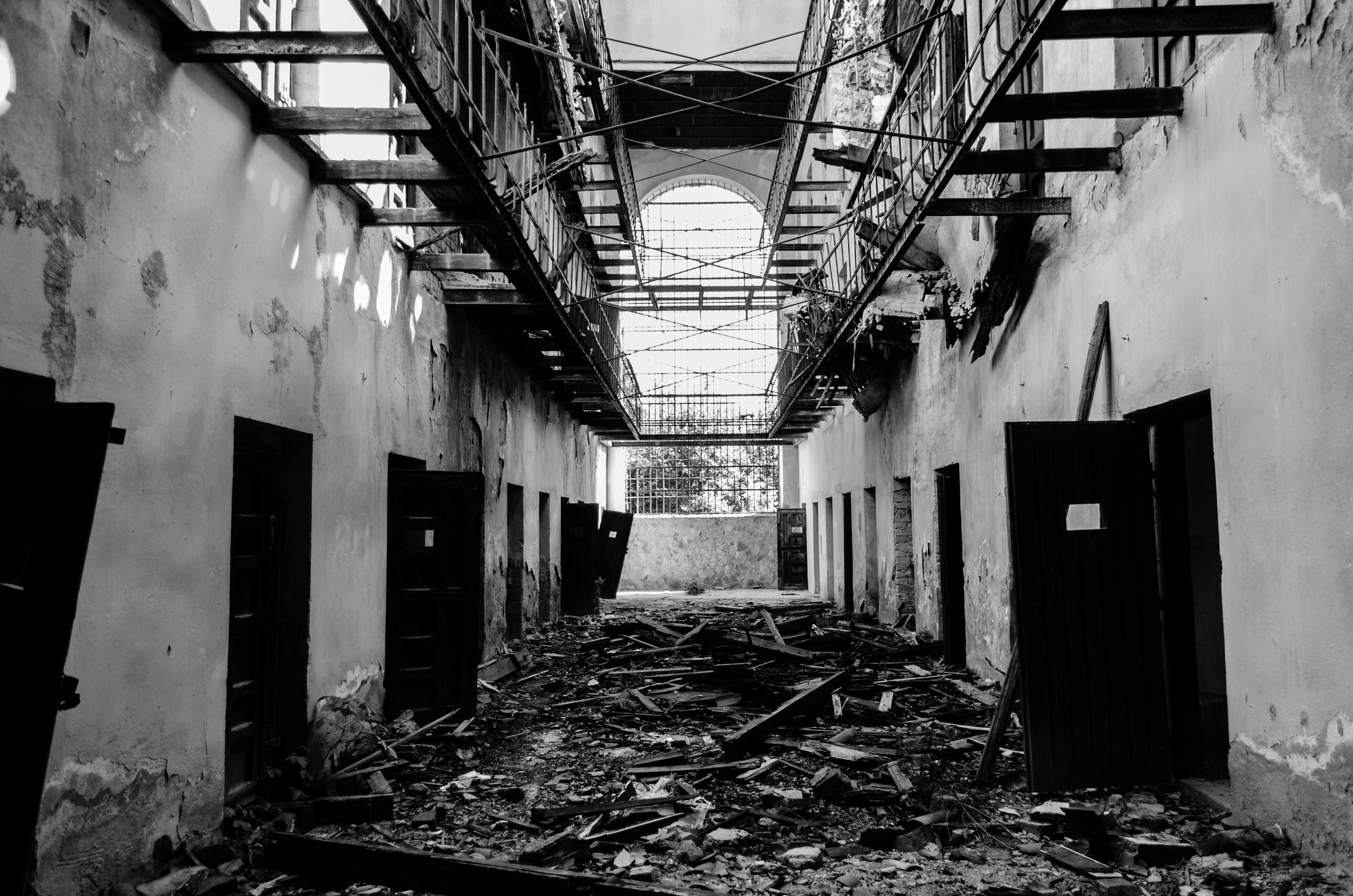
Doftana Prison (now derelict) was the site where many communists were imprisoned

The Repression of communists in the Kingdom of Romania was political repression against people who held communist views in the Kingdom of Romania between 1921 and 1944. In 1921, a number of 271 members of the Socialist-Communist Party who voted for the affiliation of the party into the Third International were arrested and the following year they were tried and convicted by a military court to various terms of forced labour.

The 1924 Mârzescu Law banned the Romanian Communist Party and provided the death penalty for communist agitators, forcing the party to go underground for the following decades. Members of the Communist Party were routinely arrested by the police and Siguranța, the secret police. During this period, most leaders of the Communist Party were either in exile in the Soviet Union (the Moscow wing) or in prison (known as the prison wing).

== Dealul Spirii Trial ==
In May 1921, as the members of the Socialist-Communist Party voted on the inclusion of the party into the Third International, the authorities stormed the assembly hall and arrested 271 members of the party. They were held for eight months, during which they were held in very tough conditions, some of them being tortured. In 1922, they were joined with anarchist Max Goldstein in a trial by military court in which they faced the charges of crimes against the state security, terrorism, collaboration with the enemy and instigation to riot. A number of politicians and intellectuals, including historian Nicolae Iorga, Dem I. Dobrescu and Iuliu Maniu voiced their discontent over the lack of constitutional basis for the trial.

All but 37 of the prisoners were found guilty and sentenced between one month in prison and 10 months of forced labour. Goldstein was sentenced to forced labour for life. With the exception of Goldstein, the communists were pardoned June 1922 by King Ferdinand I.

== Ban of the communist ideology ==
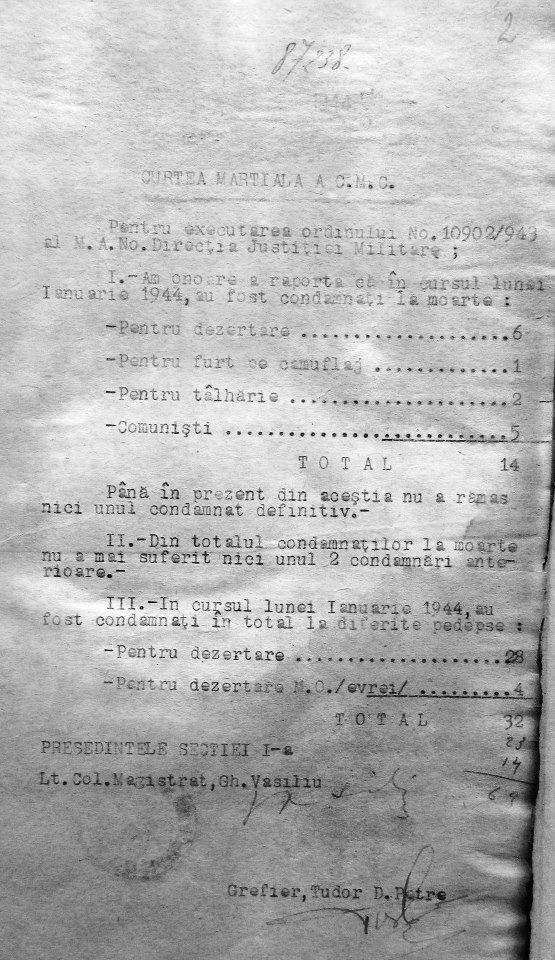
January 1944 report of the Romanian Court-martial showing 5 communists sentenced to death during the month

The 1924 Mârzescu Law banned the Romanian Communist Party and made communist agitation punishable by death, despite the fact that the 1923 Constitution of Romania banned capital punishment in peacetime. The official reason given for the banning of the party was disloyalty to the state and lack of patriotism, as it supported the territorial claims of the Soviet Union.

The ban was followed with a wave of arrests: approximately 600 communists being arrested, including many of its leaders. They were held in the Doftana prison, which was notoriously one of the harshest prisons in Europe, according to contemporary human rights and civic rights organizations. Only after mid-1930s, when the prisoners gained the status of "political prisoner", the conditions improved and the inmates were allowed to have access to books.

The ban and repression took their toll on the Communist Party and by 1944, after two decades of underground activity, the party had only about 1000 members. Historian Lucian Boia argues that if the party were legal, the number of "visible" communists would have been certainly greater, as there was a significant number of intellectuals with left-wing views.

== 1936 Craiova Trial ==
In July 1935, 19 communists were arrested, including leaders such as Ana Pauker and accused of "activity against the Romanian state" and disturbing the peace. Their trial was originally supposed to be held in Bucharest, but following large pro-communist rallies in the city, the authorities decided to hold it in some heavily guarded barracks 7 km outside the city of Craiova. The widely publicized trial ended with the conviction of Ana Pauker and other communist leaders to 20 years in prison, while the rest of the defendants to between 4 and 9 years in prison.

== See also ==
- List of communists imprisoned by the Kingdom of Romania

== Sources ==
- Vladimir Tismăneanu (2003). Stalinism for All Seasons: A Political History of Romanian Communism. University of California Press. ISBN 9780520237476.
- Lucian Boia (2012). De ce este România altfel?. Humanitas. ISBN 9789735038380.
