= Șmil Marcovici =

Șmil Marcovici (1893 – November 10, 1940) was a Romanian communist activist.

He was born in Iași. A member of the local Jewish community, he fought in the Romanian Army in World War I until 1917, when he deserted. He fled to Odessa, where, together with Christian Rakovsky and Mihail Gheorghiu Bujor, he took part in a revolutionary battalion for Romanian troops. Later, as a courier employed by Soviet Russia, Marcovici entered Romania a number of times, bringing in printing presses and important sums of money in order to finance the communist factions within the Socialist Party of Romania, as well as Bolshevik-inspired terrorist groups. Arrested as a spy in May 1920, he was sentenced to twenty years' hard labor. He escaped from Jilava Prison and took refuge in Russia. There, he graduated from the cadres school of the Comintern in Moscow, becoming an instructor at that institution. The Romanian authorities amnestied him in 1929, and, upon orders from the Comintern and the GRU, he returned to his native country.

Becoming involved with the banned Romanian Communist Party (PCdR), Marcovici joined its secretariat and was chief of the central committee's technical operations, organizing networks and clandestine links. He also took care of the printing presses and distribution of materials. He headed the central committee's internal police, verifying arrests, monitoring those suspected of being informers for the Siguranța secret police, disbursed funds and checked on the clandestine operations of paid activists. He played a similar role within the International Red Aid, supervising assistance in the form of money, food, clothing and newspapers sent to prisons. He also managed ties with various anti-fascist front organizations financed by the PCdR. He was one of nineteen communists arrested in July 1935, tried the following June in Craiova, and sent to prison. While at Doftana Prison, he befriended Nicolae Ceaușescu, a fellow inmate at the time. Marcovici died at Doftana Prison in 1940, when an earthquake caused the structure to collapse.
