= Leonte Răutu =

Romanian communist activist and propagandist (1910–1993)

Leonte Răutu Lev Nikolayevich Oigenstein
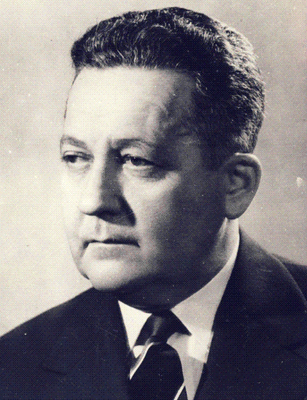
- Răutu's official photograph, taken April 15, 1967

Deputy Prime Minister of Romania
- In office March 13, 1969 – April 24, 1972

Head of the Romanian Communist Party Agitprop section
- In office 1948 – April 1, 1965
- Preceded by: Mihail Florescu
- Succeeded by: Ion Iliescu

Member of the Great National Assembly
- In office March 1948 – November 1952
- Constituency: Buzău
- In office November 1952 – March 1961
- Constituency: Turda
- In office March 1961 – March 1975
- Constituency: Bacău (south)
- In office March 1975 – March 1980
- Constituency: Bacău (north)
- In office March 1980 – March 1985
- Constituency: Aiud

Personal details
- Born: February 28, 1910 Bălți (Byeltsi), Bessarabia Governorate, Russian Empire
- Died: September 1993 (aged 83) Bucharest, Romania
- Other political affiliations: Union of Communist Youth; Bessarabian Communist Party; People's Democratic Front
- Spouse(s): Tatiana Leapis (div.); Natalia Redel
- Children: Anca Oroveanu; Lena Coler

Leonte Răutu (until 1945 Lev Nikolayevich (Nicolaievici) Oigenstein; February 28, 1910 – September 1993) was a Bessarabian-born Romanian communist activist and propagandist, who served as deputy prime minister in 1969–1972. He was chief ideologist of the Romanian Communist Party ("Workers' Party") during the rule of Gheorghe Gheorghiu-Dej, and one of his country's few high-ranking communists to have studied Marxism from the source. Răutu was of Jewish origin, though he embraced atheism and anti-Zionism. His adventurous youth, with two prison terms served for illegal political activity, culminated in his self-exile to the Soviet Union, where he spent the larger part of World War II. Specializing in agitprop and becoming friends with communist militant Ana Pauker, he joined the Romanian section of Radio Moscow.

Răutu made his way back to Romania during the communization process of the late 1940s, and, after establishing cultural and political guidelines with his articles in Scînteia and Contemporanul, became a feared potentate of the Romanian communist regime. As head of the Communist Party's new Agitprop Section, he devised some of the most controversial cultural policies, and expanded the scope of ideological censorship, introducing practices such as "processing" and "unmasking". He managed to survive Pauker's downfall in 1952, and supervised a clampdown on her alleged followers. As Gheorghiu-Dej's assistant, he played a leading part in all the successive avatars of Romanian communism: he was a Stalinist and Zhdanovist before 1955, an anti-revisionist until 1958, and a national communist since. During this long transition, he instigated (and gave a Marxist backing to) the successive campaigns against Gheorghiu-Dej's political adversaries, selectively purged academia of suspected anti-communists, and deposed some of his own supporters. He became widely hated for his perceived lack of scruples, depicted by disgraced communist writers as "the perfect acrobat" or "Malvolio".

While maintaining influence during the late stages of Gheorghiu-Dej's rule, Răutu backed the party's "Romanianization" and came to be seen as a self-hating Jew. He preserved some of his prestige after his national-communist friend Nicolae Ceaușescu took over the party leadership, continuing and accelerating Romanianization. Răutu finally lost his Agitprop prerogatives, but remained directly involved in the supervision of cultural affairs, and received high distinctions from Ceaușescu's own hand. After his stint as Deputy Prime Minister, he became rector of the party's own Ștefan Gheorghiu Academy, and still played a part in defining the official dogmas; however, he also tolerated dissenting intellectuals, who criticized national communism from Marxist-Leninist and Neo-Marxist positions. He returned to favor in 1980, as Ceaușescu himself fell back on a stricter interpretation of Marxism-Leninism, but was eventually deposed in 1981, as punishment for his daughter's decision to emigrate. He was kept under watch for his alleged contacts with the KGB and spent the rest of his life in relative obscurity, witnessing the fall of communism in 1989.

== Biography ==
=== Early activities ===
Rătu's birthplace was Bălți (Byeltsi), a city in the Bessarabia Governorate, Russian Empire, where his father, Nikolai Ivanovich Oigenstein (or Nicolai Ivanovici Oighenstein), worked as a pharmacist. The Oigensteins were Russian-educated Jews, and did not speak Romanian until ca. 1920. Some communist sources suggest that Răutu was born in the Kingdom of Romania, at Fălticeni, but this account is either misled or misleading. Lev Nikolayevich (later Leonte or Leonea) was the eldest of three brothers; Dan (later Dan Răutu) was the second-born; the third brother, Mikhail, would later take the name of Mihail "Mișa" Oișteanu.

Lev witnessed the birth of Greater Romania from Bălți, where he remained until his high-school graduation. He later relocated to the Bukovina region, and, in 1928, was in Bucharest, the national capital. The future ideologist entered the University of Bucharest to study mathematics, but never graduated. (He may also have spent a while at the Bucharest Medical School.) From 1925 to 1934, young Oigenstein made his living as a private tutor, active in Bălți, Cernăuți, and finally Bucharest. He entered the Communist Youth in December 1929 and the party itself in 1931; his brother Dan headed the Communist Students Organization from 1932, and was accepted into the party in 1933. In the years when the Romanian Communist Party (PCR, later "Workers' Party", or PMR) was banned, Lev was editor of the party organ Scînteia and worked with Ștefan Foriș, Lucrețiu Pătrășcanu, Valter Roman, Sorin Toma, Mircea Bălănescu and Tatiana Leapis (later Bulan). Leapis was Răutu's first wife, but left him for Foriș.

Characterized as intelligent, ironic and well-informed, Răutu preferred to read Russian and Soviet literature. Although lacking a thorough training in philosophy, he was one of the few PCR activists with a certain knowledge of Marxist and even non-Marxist theory, but despised most forms of continental philosophy and modernism. Political scientist Vladimir Tismăneanu describes Răutu as comparable with some other Eastern European dogmatic Stalinists, from Jakub Berman and József Révai to Kurt Hager. In this definition, Răutu was a "self-hating intellectual". Historian Lucian Boia believes that, in adopting communism, Răutu forfeited his Jewishness and "became abstract", an "ideological soldier". Tismăneanu also notes that Răutu separated from his Jewish roots very early in life, growing up into Russian culture, condemning all expression of Jewish nationalism, and becoming classifiable as a "non-Jewish Jew". Likewise, historian Lucian Nastasă describes Răutu as one of the Romanian communists who were "less dominated by the obsession of ethnic affiliation (the religious one being entirely excluded by the aggressive atheism promoted in the Soviet Union)"; Răutu and others were instead animated by their "obedience to the Soviet Union." Communist Silviu Brucan, who worked under Răutu and was also Jewish, recalls that PMR leader Gheorghe Gheorghiu-Dej had a condescending view of Răutu as "Jewish and culturally Russian".

Răutu was first tried for sedition while still in the Communist Youth: on August 20, 1930, a Bessarabian tribunal validated arrest warrants for "the Oighenștein [sic] brothers", during a round-up of communists and alleged Soviet spies. Lev was consequently sentenced to a one-year prison term. He was for a while held in Chișinău jail, then moved to Doftana prison, in the company of other PCR militants, becoming acquainted with many of Romania's future political bosses. Shortly after being released, in 1932, he was again on trial: until 1934, he was again in prison, first at the penitentiary facility of Cernăuți and then at Jilava Prison. This episode ended with him becoming an activist for the communist committee in Bucharest, and head of its Agitprop section. After his breakup with Tatiana Leapis, the young activist met his future wife Natalia "Niunia" Redel, herself Jewish and Russian-educated. Implicated in the communist underground and working for the International Red Aid, she found employment with a clinic ran by physician Leon Ghelerter, himself politically active with the United Socialists.

As recounted by Sorin Toma, in 1936 or 1937 Răutu personally witnessed, and excused, Foriș's mental breakdown. During early 1937, the two men oversaw the expulsion from the party of a young novelist, Alexandru Sahia, whom they depicted as an infiltrator. Following the outbreak of the Spanish Civil War, Răutu was among those tasked with recruiting Romanian leftists for the International Brigades. This was one of his final activities in Greater Romania. Answering a call for repatriation, Răutu and Natalia emigrated to the Soviet Union following the 1940 occupation of Bessarabia. Before leaving, he entrusted his documents to Foriș's lover and secretary, Victoria Sârbu.

Although Jewish, Răutu was not dissuaded by the interval of Nazi–Soviet cooperation: once relocated to the Moldavian SSR, he was made co-editor of Pămînt Sovietic ("Soviet Land"), a propaganda magazine. Counted as a Soviet citizen throughout the war, he may have also been an ideological instructor for the Bessarabian Communist Party. Lev and Natalia were married in the Soviet Union. Little is known about the couple in the months that followed the Nazi and Romanian attack on the Soviet Union. They escaped Bessarabia, and fled further inland. Răutu himself reported having worked as a mere laborer at two sand quarries and a kolkhoz, between 1942 and 1943. He and Natalia had two children, both of whom died, probably of hunger, during the months of Soviet retreat.

=== Communist rise ===
At some point (perhaps in 1943), Răutu became head of the Radio Moscow Romanian-language division, making him a favorite of exile faction leader Ana Pauker's, together with Valter Roman and Petre Borilă. According to sociologist and former communist Pavel Câmpeanu, he owed Pauker not only his career, but also his life, since she had made sure that Răutu and the others were never called up for active duty. This assignment also placed Răutu in direct contact with some of Pauker's colleagues in the Comintern: he replaced Basil Spiru, of Marx University fame, and was supervised by Rudolf Slánský. His other job was as book editor for the Foreign Languages Publishing House. Răutu returned to Romania in 1945 at Pauker's request and immediately rose to the top of the party's propaganda apparatus, as Iosif Chișinevschi's deputy, joining the editorial team of the revived Scînteia, and becoming one of the most active contributors to Contemporanul monthly.

The Romanian-sounding surname of Răutu, picked out after a Romanianization policy was imposed by the PCR doctrinaires, may have been borrowed from the novels of Lev's one favorite Romanian author, Constantin Stere. Under this signature, he published in mid-1946 a brochure called Problemele democrației în lumina marxismului ("Problems of Democracy as Highlighted by Marxism"). Communist writer Miron Radu Paraschivescu welcomed the work as a keynote on the people's democracy, as "informed by the Soviet nationalities policy". Răutu was among the most vocal critics of multiparty, pluralist democracy, together with Brucan, Paraschivescu, Sorin Toma, Ștefan Voicu, Nestor Ignat, Nicolae Moraru, and Traian Șelmaru. Răutu later recruited the core of the PMR's ideologists from his group. Răutu's Scînteia articles were noted for their bitter irony and for the vehemence of the insults they addressed to political enemies, in particular the National Peasants' Party and its organ Dreptatea. His Contemporanul articles included an attack on Grigore Gafencu, a figure of the anti-communist Romanian diaspora—the text was celebrated by Paraschivescu as of a "polemical tone, in which his combative nervousness does not alter his logical succession".

The Oigenstein family was becoming integrated into the nomenklatura and lived in villas located near the political epicenter that was the Primăverii compound: Londra Street, then Turgheniev Street. Lev and Natalia had two daughters: Anca, born 1947, and Elena ("Lena"), born 1951. The other Oigensteins and the Redels also moved to Romania. According to Câmpeanu, Răutu now illustrated the "abundance of Jews within the structures of Romania's emergent Stalinism"—though the overall Jewish community had few communists, the propaganda apparatus was subject to an "overwhelming Jewification". Câmpeanu proposes that the most likely explanation for this fact is that the two men "preferred to work with people of their own ethnicity, a preference that may have been strengthened by the existence of some older personal relations." He finds that this was an anomaly, since, in other branches of the party, apostate Jews would resort an antisemitism which was "more cynical, aggressive and capricious than the native variant".

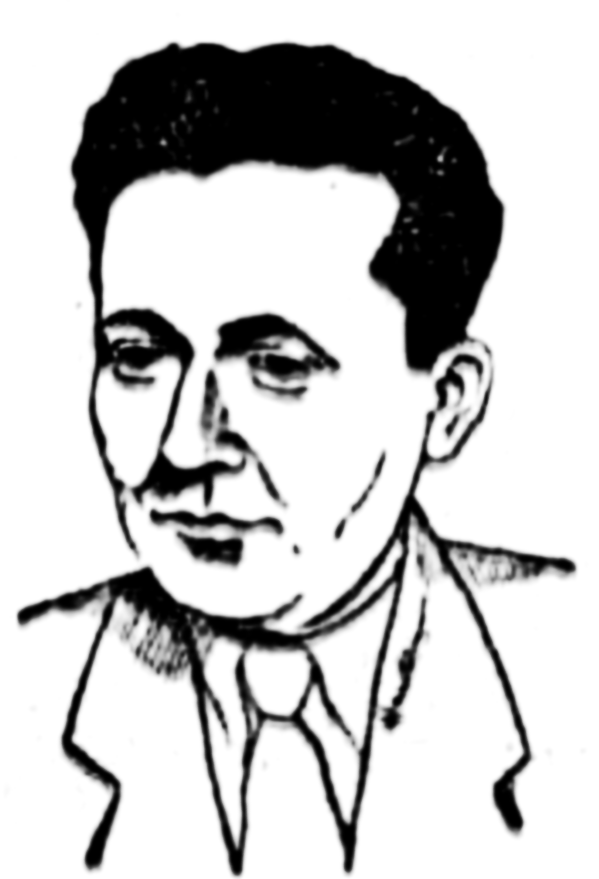
Anonymous portrait drawing of Răutu in Contemporanul, May 1948

In his other main capacity, Răutu helped set up and guide the PCR's Agitprop, or "Political Education", Section. It came into existence in November 1945, with Răutu still serving as its deputy chief—Colonel Mihail Florescu was its inaugural chairman. On March 27, 1947, he lectured at Dalles Hall about the superiority of Socialist Realism, which he identified as being rooted in 19th-century French literature and dialectical materialism. Răutu took over as full leader of Agitprop in 1948, just months before the kingdom was replaced with a communist state, officially at the request of communist-controlled trade unions. The Agitprop Section embodied the PMR's control over the Education and Culture ministries, the Romanian Academy, the Radio Broadcasting Committee and cinema studios, the AGERPRES agency, the Writers' Union and the Artists' Guild, and even sporting associations and clubs.

From June 1948, Răutu also joined the editorial staff of a newly reestablished literary magazine, Viața Romînească. That same month, he lectured at the Soviet–Romanian House of Friendship about Russian philosopher Vissarion Belinsky. Already in 1947, Răutu organized Agitprop's unified offensive against the nearly dissolved "reactionary" forces: the National Peasants' Party, framed during the Tămădău Affair; the National Liberal Party-Tătărescu, which Ana Pauker had pushed out of the coalition government; and the dissident Social Democrats, who were vetoing proposals to merge into the Communist Party. His orders were for communist propaganda to focus on condemning the Western Allies and their Marshall Plan (see Vin americanii!), and on supporting the supposed growth in industrial production from homegrown socialist sources. Additionally, Răutu joined Pauker in combating the spread of Zionism, signing the party's 1948 Resolution on the National Issue, which assured the Romanian Jews that their national identity would not be jeopardized under Marxist rule.

=== Establishing cultural dominance ===
Răutu was delegated by the communist workers of Bucharest to represent them at a congress preparing the ground for the Social Democrats' absorption into the Workers' Party; this inaugural meeting was held at Mihai Viteazul High School on January 24, 1948. Speaking on the occasion, he paid homage to Gheorghiu-Dej as the "living symbol of Romanian proletarian combativeness", and announced reforms such as the nationalization of industry, to be undertaken by the "Party of the working class". He served as a member of the unified central committee (February 24, 1948 – June 13, 1958), also joining the orgburo (January 24, 1950 – April 19, 1954). He doubled his executive roles with a seat on the Great National Assembly (MAN): he became a deputy for Buzău upon elections in March 1948, and continuously served as Turda's representative between November 1952 and March 1961.

Formally acknowledged as Chișinevschi's closest collaborator, Răutu is widely regarded as the dictator of Romanian cultural life until the death of party leader Gheorghiu-Dej. His credentials came from the communist essay Împotriva cosmopolitismului și obiectivismului burghez în științele sociale ("Against Cosmopolitanism and Bourgeois Objectivism in Social Science"), published by the party press and Lupta de Clasă journal in 1949. This work introduced Romanians to historical materialism and a partiinost' analysis of cultural or scientific matters, borrowing Soviet criticism of "bourgeois pseudoscience": against genetics, neo-Malthusianism, Indeterminism, and in large part against "cosmopolitan" social thinkers (Ernest Bevin, Léon Blum, Harold Laski). The two centuries of Romanian philosophy, from the advocates of Westernization (Titu Maiorescu) to the radical nativists (Nae Ionescu), were dismissed as irrelevant to the real priorities of Romanian workers, with Răutu firmly rooting Romania's past in Slavic Europe. Likewise, the right-wing historian Gheorghe I. Brătianu was depicted as both a "Hitlerite" and a puppet of "American imperialism".

Răutu's text is regarded by Tismăneanu as an "embarrassing" contribution to the field, and described by historian Leonard Ciocan as the origin of "manichean" methodology and "typically Stalinist" discourse in Romanian social science. The direct inspiration for such contributions was Soviet culture boss Andrei Zhdanov, whose anti-formalist and anti-individualist campaigns he would try to replicate in Sovietized Romania. Since 1948, he had been preoccupied with eradicating "decadent" literature and art, including urban-themed modernism, but also informed his subordinates not to allow a resurgence of ruralizing traditionalism. He declared Zhdanov's "bitter criticism" of composer Dmitri Shostakovich to be a "profound" positive example: "Take the gloves off, let's start criticizing [as well]. Here too we can learn from the Soviets." Also then, he ordered a selection of publishing houses and literary magazines that followed a "just line", and set aside funds for financing writers who had internalized the Workers' Party principles and "stepped down from the ivory tower". On November 2, 1948, Răutu himself took a position on the steering committee of the Romanian Society for Friendship with the Soviet Union. His brother Mihail Oișteanu was similarly employed as a lecturer by the House of Romanian–Soviet Friendship.

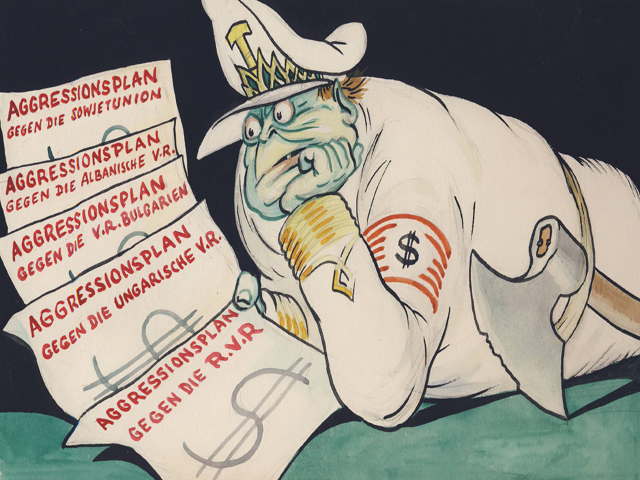
Josip Broz Tito as a villain plotting the invasion of Romania (East German cartoon, presented to Gheorghiu-Dej on his 50th birthday, 1951)

As part of their propaganda campaigns, Răutu and Chișinevschi created a heroic image of Alexandru Sahia, who had died short after his 1937 expulsion, and whose supposed ideological faults had been excused. A notorious experiment approved by Răutu, and brought to life by Sorin Toma, was the campaign against celebrated poet Tudor Arghezi, attacked as a "decadent" and subsequently banned for a number of years. Looking back on the events in 1949, the Agitprop chief told his subordinates: "[Writers] who are still enemies must be stomped upon without mercy. Arghezi, who has not changed, not even today, I have fulminated." Other targets were literary critics Șerban Cioculescu and Vladimir Streinu, both depicted as ill-adapted to the spirit of socialist patriotism. In 1949, when Răutu began his purge of academia, one of the first to fall was literary historian George Călinescu, a professor at the University of Bucharest, who, although left-wing, was not considered a true communist. As such figures were sidelined, Răutu himself was given the Chair of Marxism-Leninism at Bucharest University, which he kept from March 1949 to May 1952.

In April 1949, Răutu was one of the Romanian delegates to the Congress of Advocates of Peace, seconding Mihail Sadoveanu (who reputedly eclipsed him), afterwards helping to organize the Congress' Romanian chapter. In January 1950, Răutu and Sadoveanu also organized Mihai Eminescu's centennial, followed in January 1952 by the Ion Luca Caragiale centennial. From March 1950, Răutu and Miron Constantinescu were called upon by Pauker to organize the ideological retraining of various writers who had been excluded from the party—Eusebiu Camilar, Vladimir Cavarnali, Lucia Demetrius, Mihu Dragomir, Coca Farago, Alexandru Kirițescu, Sanda Movilă, Ioana Postelnicu, Zaharia Stancu, Cicerone Theodorescu, and Victor Tulbure.

Navigating his course between the warring PMR groups of Pauker and Gheorghiu-Dej, Răutu established his reputation during the fall of a third faction, Lucrețiu Pătrășcanu's "Secretariat" group. Already in Împotriva cosmopolitismului..., Răutu called his rival an "enemy of the working class", and a defamer of Marxist values. As noted by Tismăneanu, he applied "his proverbial zeal" to condemning Pătrășcanu's entire political activity. Also in 1949, Romania began the collectivization of agriculture, with Răutu called in for ideological support. His articles in Scînteia produced definitions of chiaburi (the Romanian version of kulaks, or wealthy peasants), which prioritized their status as employers of farmhands and owners of business, rather than the surface of land they owned. Some two years later, he suggested that Romania still had to deal with the existence of chiaburi as the "largest capitalist class". He was similarly involved in ensuring a mass circulation for Petru Dumitriu's Drum fără pulbere, made infamous with its parochial depiction of construction work on the Danube–Black Sea Canal—and for glossing over the fact that most workers were political prisoners. In 1951, Răutu also proposed to have the work filmed (though his move was defeated after opposition mounted by the novelist Marin Preda).

With the Tito–Stalin split, Răutu became involved in exposing supposed "Titoist" infiltration in Romania, ordering a tight monitoring of Tanjug propaganda, and then a Romanian Agitprop project focused on vilifying Yugoslavia. As part of this effort, he commissioned Titus Popovici to write a play specifically against Titoism. In parallel, he took over supervision of the nominally independent left-wing daily Adevărul, overseeing its liquidation in 1951, and was involved in establishing the network of "people's councils", which cemented the communist grip on city and village administration during late 1950. On October 5, 1950, he was assigned to the central committee of the communist-led People's Democratic Front. In February 1951, he and Mihail Roller were guests of honor at the party marking the 76th birthday of poet Alexandru Toma.

=== Pauker's fall and "processing" campaign ===
Răutu first impressed critics of the regime by being able to survive Pauker's downfall (1952), and was one of the very few of the wartime exiles not to be designated a "Right deviationist". A theory first advanced by political scientist Ghiță Ionescu is that Gheorghiu-Dej relied on the party's "Bessarabian wing" to conspire against Pauker. This faction included Răutu, Borilă, and Emil Bodnăraș, all of whom enjoyed support from the emerging Soviet leader, Nikita Khrushchev. Together with Constantinescu as the other PMR intellectual, Răutu initiated the campaign to purge all other supposed inner-party oppositionists, drafting the PMR resolution on prelucrări ("processing", a euphemism for "interrogations"). In his speeches to the PMR sections, Răutu described the cadre verification policy as inspired by the 19th CPSU Congress and its talk of "ideological work" being paramount in the consolidation of socialism. He declared Pauker a saboteur of collectivization, and her associate Vasile Luca guilty of "criminal activity".

In large part, "processing" meant a clampdown on writers with supposed (and supposedly concealed) "fascist" sympathies. A communist-turned-dissident poet, Nina Cassian, recalls: "Leonte Răutu—[...] dominated these scatty, vulnerable, terrified and confused beings—the artists and the writers, producing tragedies and comedies, stagings glories and stigmatization, paralyzing one's morality, activating another's immorality". Cassian was targeted as a critic of the regime, and kept under surveillance for her "negative influence" on other literary figures, including Preda, who was at that time her lover. One author to escape from Răutu's campaigns was modernist left-winger Geo Dumitrescu, whom poet Eugen Jebeleanu defended, at the last moment, against claims that he had been working for far-right newspapers during the war years. Senior writers George Călinescu and Victor Eftimiu were accused of concealing Social Democratic sympathies; in 1951, Călinescu tried to ingratiate himself with Răutu by proposing him for admittance into the Romanian Academy, commending his essay on Joseph Stalin's contribution as a linguist. Meanwhile, historian Constantin Daicoviciu, a former member of the Iron Guard fascist movement, was found to be an embarrassment for the communist-run peace committees and banned from politics. Paradoxically, other areas under Răutu's control escaped such purges, and former far-right affiliates such as Octav Onicescu and Ion Barbu pursued their scientific careers with little standing in their way.

Răutu built himself a new power base comprising noted Agitprop figures, some of whom were also writers and journalists. The prominent ones were Moraru, Șelmaru, Savin Bratu, Ovid Crohmălniceanu, Paul Georgescu, Nicolae Tertulian and Ion Vitner. Over the years, his deputies included Roller, Ofelia Manole, Paul Niculescu-Mizil, Nicolae Goldberger (a member of the politburo since the 1930s), Manea Mănescu (in charge of science), Cornel Onescu and Pavel Țugui (later expelled from the party for having concealed his youthful sympathy for the Iron Guard). Some of his other favorites, including Constantin Ionescu Gulian (recovered from an initial put-down for his "cosmopolitan" discourse) and Ernő Gáll, became the official interpreters of Marxist philosophy. Before and after 1952, Răutu's program was rigidly and thoroughly Stalinist. As such, Tismăneanu writes, he spearheaded the most damaging campaigns in the cultural field, "designed to terrorize Romania's intellectual class": "the destruction of Romanian Academy research institutes, the [Academy's own] mutilation, the forced Sovietization—[...] the gaudy kowtowing at Russian culture (as it had been defined under the Stalinist canon)—[...] the promotion of fanatics, of the ideologically possessed, impostors and dilettantes, to high cultural offices". In private diaries which recorded his critique of the regime, writer Pericle Martinescu spoke about Răutu's contribution to the "criminal combat" for "liquidating the old world." As he notes, a March 1952 article by Răutu condensed "an entire mass-murdering action against the Romanian people".

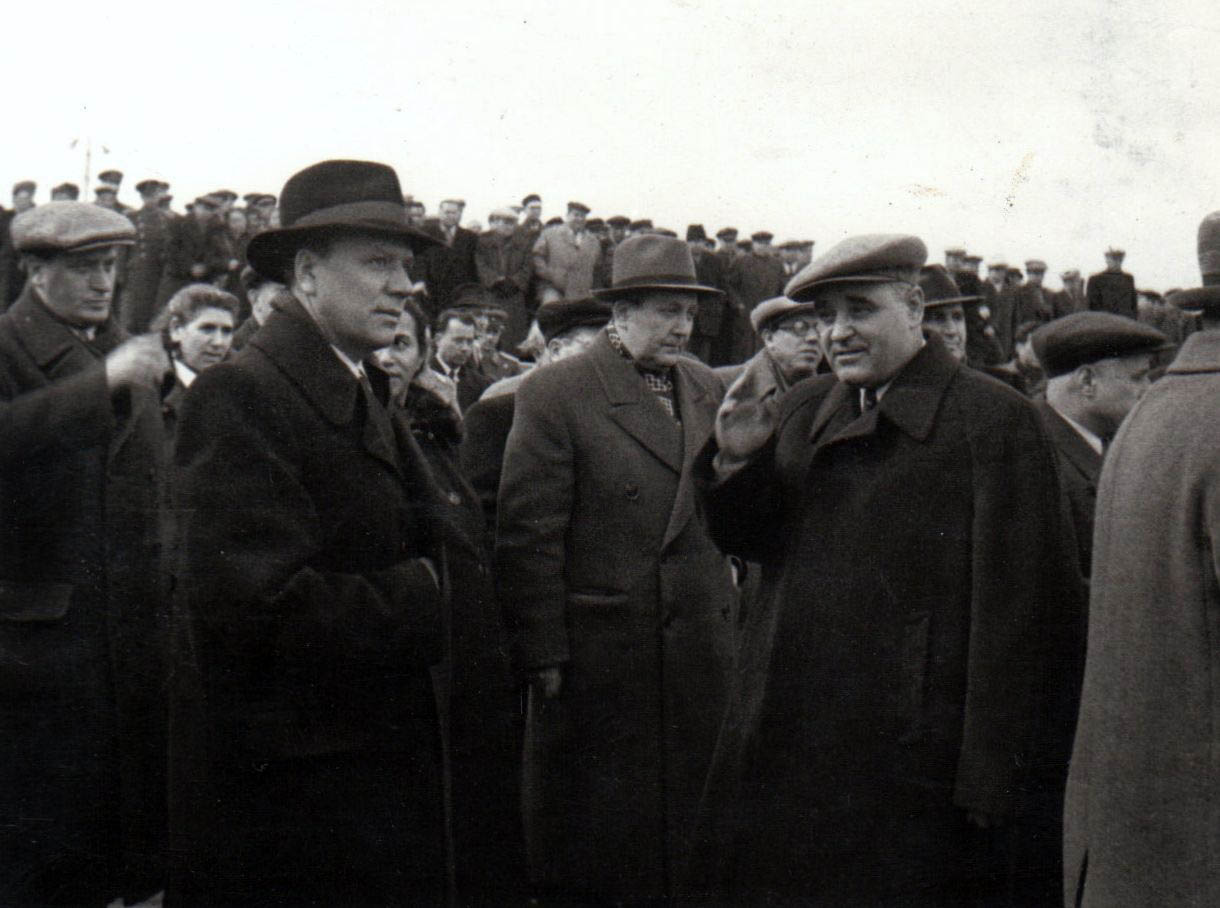
March 1953: Gheorghiu-Dej (front row) returning from Stalin's funeral and being met by party officials, including Răutu (second row, middle, with Ghizela Vass and Mihail Roller on either side behind him)

Răutu's monopoly on the humanities is also credited with having incapacitated the development of independent ideas in Romanian philosophy and sociology, as well as with the near-complete elimination of psychology as a credible academic subject. Instructed by Gheorghiu-Dej, the Agitprop chief even targeted Romania's pre-communist Marxist current as the school of "Menshevism"—announcing, in 1951, that Constantin Dobrogeanu-Gherea, the father of Romanian social democracy, was worthy of condemnation. Conversely, he and Ionescu Gulian attacked the conservative opinion-maker and Gherea's rival, Titu Maiorescu, as the icon of bourgeois conformity. The neotraditionalist philosopher Lucian Blaga, a contemporary of Răutu's, was also vilified. Blaga was the target of ominous commentary in the communist newspapers, singled out for revenge by the communist poet Mihai Beniuc, and ultimately derided in public by Răutu. Other main targets of Răutu's communist censorship were Tudor Vianu, Liviu Rusu (depicted as too idealistic) and Blaga's in-law Teodor Bugnariu. Răutu demanded that Rusu write an article condemning Maiorescu through the lens of Marxism-Leninism. A young scholar at the time, Mihai Șora described Răutu as the object of a fearful myth: "a censor with such keen eyes, that one will find it impossible to slip by [and] a very cultivated man, finding great pleasure in reading bourgeois, Western etc. literature, the very same one he will publicly condemn."

Pursuing his ideological condemnation of philology, which in 1951 had seen him calling for a ban on works by Ferdinand de Saussure, Răutu arrived at imposing Stalin's own tract, Marxism and Problems of Linguistics. Marxist linguists who were not keen on adopting Stalin's perspective, including Alexandru Rosetti, Alexandru Graur and Iorgu Iordan, were investigated for "enemy-like activity" and left virtually unemployed until 1954. Meanwhile, Răutu was censuring some of Roller's extreme positions in historiography, organizing a panel of historians, who were encouraged to discuss their problems; a review session was held in November 1954, and resulted in much loss of prestige for Roller. At that stage, the young communist activist Nicolae Ceaușescu was reporting to Răutu in matters of sport. Their activity included a 1953 investigation of the Central Army Club, suspected of "caste-like" factionalism and of "placing [its] interests above the interests of national sport." From January 1956 to 1959, the two men also oversaw a Party Commission for Nationality Issues, which assessed the communization of ethnic minorities.

=== "Anti-Revisionism" ===
Răutu was still unchallenged as cultural policymaker even after Stalin's death, although the Romanian regime contemplated structural changes. After 1956, essentially his only superior within the party was Gheorghiu-Dej, who cared little for cultural intrigues. According to Gheorghiu-Dej's disciple, Gheorghe Apostol, Chișinevschi and Răutu sought to endear themselves to the PMR leadership by promoting a "cult of personality", which Gheorghiu-Dej resented and actively discouraged. At the VIIth party congress on December 28, 1955, Răutu became an alternate member of the politburo. Shortly after, he began an investigation into the activities of Nicolae Labiș, the disillusioned Marxist poet. Răutu signaled Labiș's fall into disgrace, declaring his piece "Murdered Albatross" to be pessimistic and unworthy of "building-sites that construct socialism."

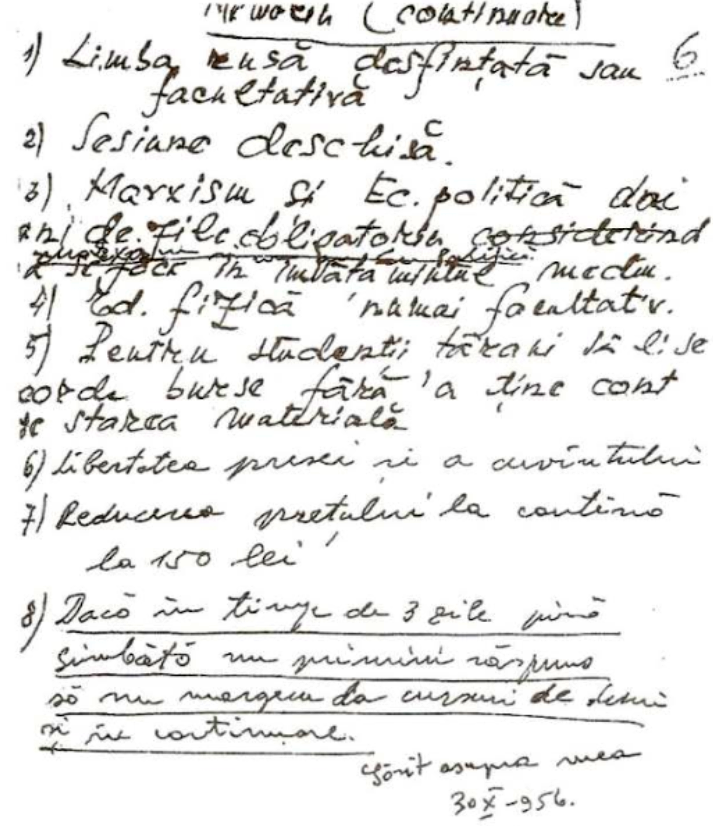
Demands made by striking students at the various colleges in Timișoara in October 1956. These include the elimination of Russian-language courses and a reduction of Marxist studies, as well as a restoration of free speech

The tensions between Gheorghiu-Dej and Khrushchev, who had risen to a paramount position in the Soviet Union, were highlighted during the Hungarian revolution of 1956. Romania participated in the punitive expedition against Hungary. Răutu himself reported that the general public felt that Romania suffered "because of the terrible boners made by the Soviets in Hungary." Documenting the reorientation of the mid-1950s, scholar Ken Jowitt included Răutu and Gheorghiu-Dej's economic adviser, Alexandru Bârlădeanu, among the PMR "regime figures" who mediated "between the progressives and the Stalinists." When Gheorghiu-Dej, who played the two factions against each other, decided to overturn some of the Zhdanovist measures adopted in the 1950s, he even described Răutu and Roller as responsible for the PMR's frail relationship with the Romanian intellectuals.

Răutu had another close call at the Party Plenary of June 1957: Chișinevschi and Constantinescu were both attacked by Gheorghiu-Dej as "liberal socialists" and "revisionists", then expelled from the party's inner core. Even though he was one of Chișinevschi's confidants (and Natalia Răutu was Chișinevschi's secretary), Răutu managed to survive the incident and preserved his standing. He expressed full support for Gheorghiu-Dej, and was even tasked by the communist leader with redacting the Plenary documents for public view. He collaborated on this project with Ceaușescu, who was one of Gheorghiu-Dej's trusted men. In early 1957, Răutu probed the Artists' Guild, allegedly entrapping M. H. Maxy, the painter and communist activist, into an "unmasking" session during which anti-Stalinists were allowed to have their say; the episode was cut short by another painter, Corneliu Baba, who spoke in favor of both artistic freedom and leniency toward Maxy.

Răutu's only potential rival was Grigore Preoteasa, who joined the central committee's secretariat in charge of ideology shortly after Chișinevschi was sidelined. As Tismăneanu notes, this was a chance for Romanian culture to be revisited "with a modicum of decency". However, Preoteasa's death that November allowed Răutu undisputed control over culture. Răutu personally witnessed the fatal accident, which took place on a plane taking the delegation to Moscow's Vnukovo Airfield. He and Preoteasa took turns playing chess with Ceaușescu before the failed landing. Răutu was injured, and had to be hospitalized. This hiatus brought an unexpected relaxation of censorship, which notably allowed ethnologists to write about the traditional Romanian dwellings (a theme that Răutu would have otherwise proscribed) and translators to focus on contemporary literature. Upon returning, the PMR ideologist heralded an all-out anti-revisionist campaign: his May 1958 speech began with attacks on the anti-Soviet Internationalist Communist Union, Hungarian revolutionaries and "liberal theories"; went on to criticize Stalinist "dogmatism" and the "personality cult"; and eventually listed Romanian philosophers and artists who had deviated into one field or the other.

Răutu reassessed his own political positioning, depicting Chișinevschi as a morbid Stalinist and himself as a balanced figure. He then helped Gheorghiu-Dej deal with the apparent opposition of old-time communists, deciding in May 1958 that the association of former prisoners of fascism was "petty bourgeois" in nature, and needed to be dissolved. During June, he and Gheorghiu-Dej produced a case against the PMR veteran Constantin Doncea, who had been tempted to question Gheorghiu-Dej's claims of revolutionary primacy. Răutu labeled Doncea a Titoist, then introduced claims that Doncea had followers in the cultural sphere—a pretext for the verification of writers who still harbored modernist ideas. This happened even as Răutu drafted a confidential note about improving relations with Yugoslavia and toning down anti-Titoist propaganda. In summer 1958, he went public with his critique of Roller, who had allegedly permitted his subordinates to publish complaints against Gheorghiu-Dej.

In a contrary move, Răutu intervened to sideline several of Roller's emerging critics, including Andrei Oțetea. Though not involved directly in the controversy, he sent one of his associates to act as Oțetea's ideological supervisor; according to historian Șerban Papacostea, this unnamed figure had little competence in the scholarly field, noted among his peers for being unable to properly date events such as the Treaty of Passarowitz. The PMR cultural activists, Răutu included, also masterminded the show trial of philosopher Constantin Noica, writer Dinu Pillat and other literary dissidents, all of them brutalized by the Securitate secret police. He preserved much of his great influence, from directing the censorship apparatus (officially placed under Iosif Ardeleanu) to putting out Scînteia (approving each issue before it went into printing).

=== Transition to national communism ===
Between June 13, 1958 and June 25, 1960, Răutu was only a junior member of the central committee. In October 1958, he supported a measure which dissolved the orgburo into the PMR administrative section, effectively placing the entire party apparatus under Ceaușescu's direct supervision. While the regime veered into de-satellization and Stalinized national communism, he and Niculescu-Mizil were asked by Gheorghiu-Dej to press the Soviets into recognizing Romania's role in the defeat of Nazism. They raised the issue at an international congress of communist historians in 1959, when they informed their Soviet counterpart, N. I. Shatagin, that they expected a revision of the Soviet official line. Niculescu-Mizil sees his boss as partly responsible for transmitting Romania's new terms to the Comecon and the Warsaw Pact, whose sessions he attended in 1961–1963. In tandem, Răutu engineered some of the newer campaigns to quash alternative culture, indicating suspects to the Securitate. These included: communist writers Alexandru Jar and Gábor Gaál, attacked for having demanded de-Stalinization; modernist sculptor Milița Petrașcu, "unmasked" as an opponent of the regime in a humiliating public session; and classical composer Mihail Andricu, castigated for having revealed his appreciation for the West. Răutu's own push for retaining the Socialist Realist canon with a reprint of Drum fără pulbere was quietly defeated in early 1959 by his own subordinate, Țugui.

While overseeing the cultural purges, Răutu networked between Gheorghiu-Dej and Soviet Ambassador Alexei Yepishev. The latter congratulated the PMR for its "extremely valuable initiative" in exposing Petrașcu, noting that the Soviets could learn from the example. Historian Stefano Bottoni argues that, in Jar's case, Răutu may have set a trap for Jar personally, by inviting his former friend to state openly his contempt for the PMR line. Răutu also refused to reinstate the modernist poet-translator Ion Vinea, calling him artistically irrelevant and an agent of British Intelligence. In 1960, he returned to the George Călinescu issue, accusing him of deviating from the PMR program. Răutu's men suggested that, as a novelist, Călinescu had portrayed the Iron Guard in too light tones; Călinescu made a personal appeal to Gheorghiu-Dej, who treated him with noted sympathy. They registered defeat when Gheorghiu-Dej allowed Călinescu to publish his novel Scrinul negru. Later in 1960, Călinescu was allowed to lecture at the university, but still not reinstated as professor. The same year, Răutu also revised his stance on Blaga. According to the latter's daughter Dorli, he and his subordinate George Ivașcu were quick to assist her father in obtaining palliative care for his terminal illness.

Tasked by the politburo with controlling the Romanian Jewish community, Răutu became a denouncer of the "Ioanid Gang". This name was applied to a cell of Jewish anti-communists who managed to rob the National Bank of Romania; captured, they were also accused of having plotted Răutu's murder. Such issues troubled the cultural ideologist: Răutu looked on as the Jews, discriminated against by the PMR's antisemitic lobby, registered for mass emigration to Israel. Răutu asked the party leaders not to strip all those who applied of their Romanian citizenship, and, responding to Gheorghiu-Dej's antisemitic comments, concluded that Romanian communism had failed at integrating the Jewish minority. Eventually, Răutu resigned himself to adopting Gheorghiu-Dej's view. He is purported as the author of a Jewish self-hatred catchphrase, taken up by the (predominantly Romanian PMR) leaders: "Jews should lose their habit of controlling things". As the party began expelling significant numbers of its Jewish members, a confidential note circulated at the top confirmed that, even in 1958, Răutu was expressing strongly antisemitic feelings. According to one eyewitness account, Răutu attacked artist Iosif Molnár for having illustrated the Romanian edition of Anne Frank's Diary with a stylized yellow badge. Instead of seeing this as a symbol of the Holocaust, Răutu accused Molnár of promoting Zionism, then ordered him to attend a "self-criticism" session.

Brucan recounts that Gheorghiu-Dej exhibited "lucidity" in noting that Răutu was downplaying both his Jewishness and his Russian mannerism. Brucan himself notes that Răutu had "systematically removed all Jews" from the Agitprop department, and "went as far as to pretend that he could not speak Russian" when receiving Soviet visitors. Similarly, Răutu was among those sent in to pacify the Hungarian Romanian minority, and (Bottoni writes) played "the role of a nationalist", airbrushing Romanianization measures, demanding action against the "hostile elements" supporting Hungarian nationalism, and participating in the disestablishment of Bolyai University. From September 1959, controlling the spread of "bourgeois nationalism" among the Hungarians was a permanent task, assigned to a PMR committee presided over by Ceaușescu and Răutu—its other job, of promoting minority interests, was entirely ceremonial. Allegedly, the two men also had differences of opinion: in January 1961, the censorship apparatus, probably instigated by Răutu, attempted to institute a ban against Aurel Baranga's play, Siciliana; Ceaușescu, who admired Baranga's work, intervened to block the attempt.

Răutu was reintegrated as a full member of the central committee on June 25, 1960, during a party congress which he and Ceaușescu helped organize. Some liberalization measures were being unveiled, and Răutu, officially introduced as a member of the MAN, found himself included in Gheorghiu-Dej's official delegation to the United States. He accompanied Gheorghiu-Dej to New York City for the Fifteenth Regular Session of the United Nations General Assembly, held in September 1960. The elections of March 1961 saw Răutu taking another deputy's seat, for southern Bacău. As such, he was directly involved in drafting Romania's socialist constitution. Speaking at a 1962 short-course session, he boasted that the 40,000 Agitprop Section activists had educated 1.4 million young Romanians, all of them inspired by the "party leaders' exigence" in the project to build a socialist society. He was notoriously silent as his former colleagues and favorites were pushed into retirement (Moraru, Țugui, Vitner) or trapped in "unmasking" sessions. Beniuc and Socialist Realist artist Constantin Baraschi both kept a grudge against Răutu, who did not defend them when the national communists made them bear the blame.

=== Between Gheorghiu-Dej and Ceaușescu ===
In 1961, Răutu and Ceaușescu helped publicize the claim that Romania's issue with the "personality cult" was associated with Pauker, whereas Gheorghiu-Dej and the other leaders of the party had received, and were deserving of, the people's genuine love. Soon after, Răutu and Paul Cornea were also tasked with convincing the writing team behind the film Tudor that the lead female part should go to Lica Gheorghiu, who was Gheorghiu-Dej's daughter. Having sidelined Sorin Toma, Răutu revised his stance on the "decadent" poets, welcoming back into the spotlight modernists like Arghezi and Ion Barbu, and even describing himself as a protector of artistic autonomy. In 1962, he tacitly approved of the PMR's policy of politically (re)integrating some of Romania's more popular traditionalist intellectuals. However, Răutu and other PMR leaders also singled out the Writers' Union chief, novelist Zaharia Stancu, as a political suspect. According to literary historian Cornel Ungureanu, Răutu stated the point discreetly, "without aggravating the Great Chief" (that is, Gheorghiu-Dej, who believed Stancu to be an earnest fellow communist). By then, Răutu was receiving letters from politically suspect writers such as Păstorel Teodoreanu and George Mărgărit, who asked to be reinstated, as reeducated but starving men. Răutu still silenced critiques of Stalinism, but only by proxy. In 1963, on Răutu's orders, Romania became, with Albania, the only Eastern Bloc country not to publish a vernacular translation of Aleksandr Solzhenitsyn's Ivan Denisovich.

In mid-1963, Gheorghiu-Dej confronted Khrushchev at a secretive meeting at Scroviștea, with both Răutu and Ceaușescu present. The PMR leadership sought to persuade Soviet leaders to dismantle its KGB network in Romania, with Khrushchev denying its very existence. In tandem, both men were called upon to investigate Maria Sîrbu, who had published an atlas on Soviet economy which showed Moldovans as the native inhabitants of Western Moldavia—a Soviet and Greater Moldovan point of view. Also that year, Niculescu-Mizil sought and obtained support from Răutu in establishing the world-affairs magazine Lumea, with Ivașcu, the former political detainee, as an editor. This publication was an explicit alternative to the local edition of Novoye Vremya, intended as a hint that Romania was no longer tributary to Soviet foreign politics. By 1964, when Gheorghiu-Dej signaled Romania's full detachment from the de-Stalinized Soviet Union, Răutu was again called upon for ideological maneuvering. Gheorghiu-Dej sided with Red China in the Sino–Soviet divorce, and Răutu helped redact the "April Theses" recognizing "the sovereign rights of each socialist state". He was afterward heard stating his disgust for past Sovietization, leaving readers shocked with his comments on those "who have shamefully kowtowed at even the most insignificant Soviet creation"; he also praised "national values" in the scientific field. He enabled Gheorghiu-Dej's anti-Hungarian rhetoric by sending him a report on the nationalistic statements made by various Hungarian authors and tolerated by the Hungarian communist government. Răutu also looked on as the regime allowed a partial recovery of his philosophical bugbears (Dobrogeanu-Gherea, then Maiorescu) and a controlled familiarization with Western literature or modernism.

Despite his concessions to localism, the Bessarabian communist still looked to the Soviet hardliners for inspiration, and was considered by his peers a Stalinist survivor, à la Mikhail Suslov; he was also compared with Hungary's György Aczél. Răutu is said to have been thankful that Chișinevschi was out of politics altogether, but was embarrassed by Miron Constantinescu's re-admittance into the nomenklatura; in front of other party figures, the two men acted like good friends. The party even selected Răutu to inform his nominal enemy that he had been widowed, Sulamita Constantinescu having been stabbed by her own daughter. Oțetea, who had finally been successful in toppling Roller from his position of Marxist historiographer, is said to have described Răutu as "the most intelligent of the communist leaders, but a bastard".

In 1964, while carrying on with his other functions, Răutu was serving as general secretary of the Foreign Trade Ministry. Gheorghiu-Dej's terminal illness transformed him into an unconditional supporter of Ceaușescu, who was emerging as the new party leader; Niculescu-Mizil recalls being informed by Răutu that "you and I must obey Ceaușescu from now on". Conflicted by his own social and ethnic origins, Răutu sought good relations with Ceaușescu, a relationship strengthened due to the friendship between Răutu's wife Natalia and Elena Ceaușescu. His cordial rapport with the Ceaușescu couple, developed during the Gheorghiu-Dej era, together with (historians suggest) his chameleon-like persona, helps account for his longevity in public life. Holding approximately equal party ranks, the two men and their families were also recipients of a luxury trip to France, arranged by Gheorghiu-Dej and with television presenter Tudor Vornicu as their guide. Răutu managed to impress Ceaușescu, even though the latter was not just fearful of the PMR prison elite, but also a nationalist with antisemitic reactions.

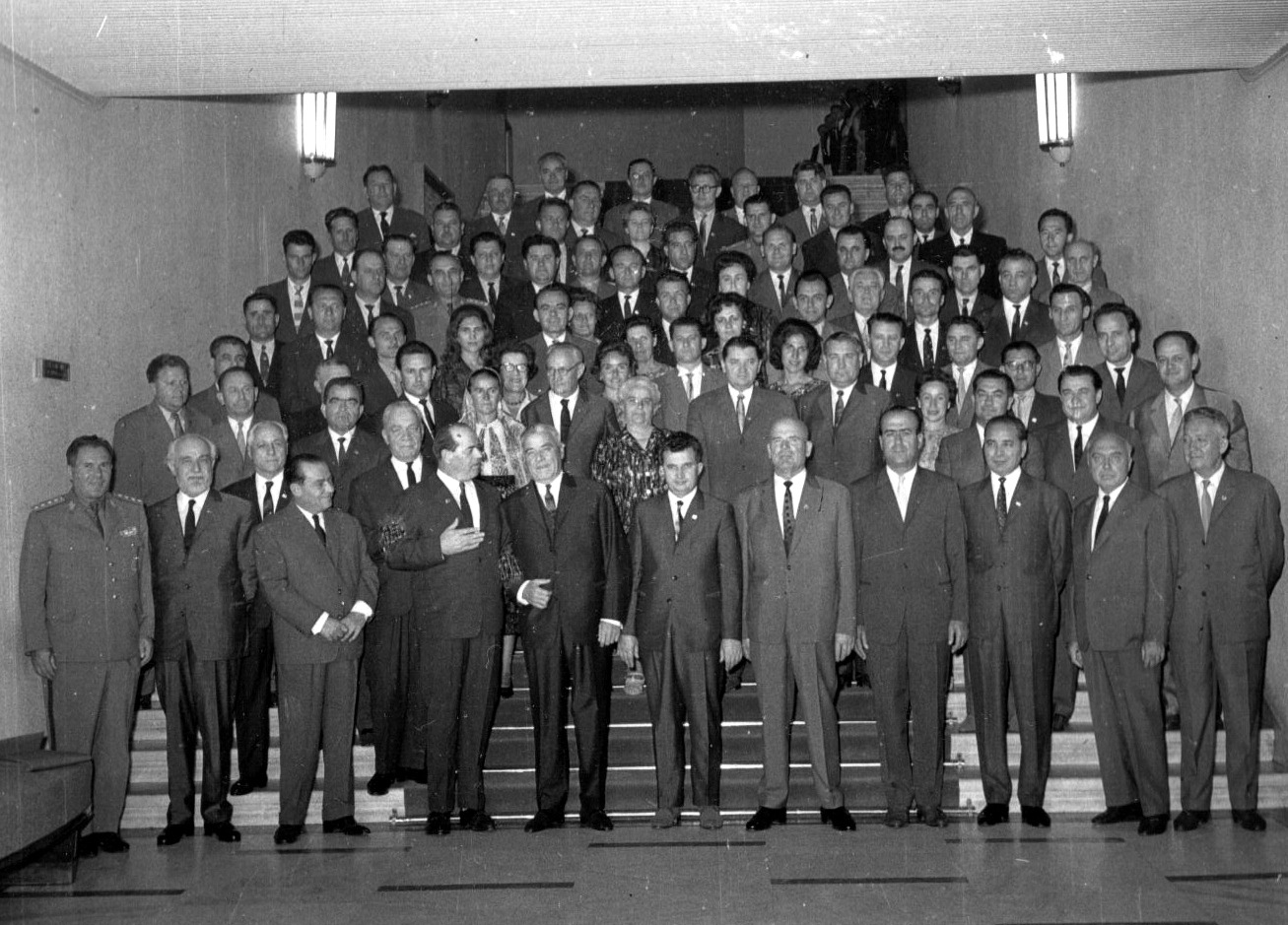
Ceaușescu and other Communist Party leaders on a visit to the Mureș-Magyar Autonomous Region (1965). Răutu is front row, first from right

Răutu authored Gheorghiu-Dej's official obituary, as published by Scînteia, and oversaw the funeral ceremony. After Ceaușescu's ascent in 1965, Răutu's was inducted into the central committee secretariat (elected March 22). He joined Ceaușescu on his first-ever mission as general secretary, namely a meeting with the scientists' community, where they had talks with Petre Constantinescu-Iași, Horia Hulubei, and Ilie Murgulescu. He also served on the party's executive committee from July 23, 1965 to November 28, 1974, one of several figures promoted as a direct result of Gheorghiu-Dej's death. When the new leader decided to reformulate Communist Party historiography, Răutu was among those tasked with compiling the short course in such a way as to describe the various ideological slips under Gheorghiu-Dej. Researched during 1965, the book was never completed. The same year, Răutu witnessed as Baranga stepped in to impose censorship in theater, by arguing that all plays by Eugène Ionesco other than Rhinoceros needed to be withdrawn from the national repertoire. Baranga cited Răutu as an authority on this issue but, as historian Cristian Vasile notes, this may have been tongue-in-cheek.

In 1966, Ceaușescu presented Răutu with the Tudor Vladimirescu Order, 1st Class; Răutu was additionally a "Hero of Socialist Labor" from 1964. Despite the protection he enjoyed, he now found that his advancement within the party was curbed, with Ceaușescu informing him that theirs was not an equal partnership. While reconfirmed in his executive functions at the party congress in 1965, Răutu was no longer a rapporteur, his position filled by the younger Dumitru Popescu-Dumnezeu. His promotion to the secretariat also required him to relinquish his long-held position at Agitprop, on April 1, 1965. His immediate successor was his own protegé Ion Iliescu, the former student organizer (and future Ceaușescu opponent).

=== Ștefan Gheorghiu Academy ===
The year 1966 marked a low point in Răutu's career, as he was only tasked with supervising the interior commerce department and the Communist Youth's Pioneer branch. According to Tismăneanu, Răutu spent much of the interval reading up on political literature, including Neo-Marxist authors frowned upon by the regime (Herbert Marcuse). In January 1967, he gave approval to publish the popular history review, Magazin Istoric. As noted by its editor, Titu Georgescu, Răutu had to be persuaded by more sympathetic party figures, including Niculescu-Mizil and Ștefan Voitec. Also according to Georgescu, Răutu signed off on an order to double Magazin Istoric's circulation, but did so without realizing that the review was already published in 60,000 copies. That year, he was similarly defeated in his attempt to prevent the regime from publishing a posthumous edition of Călinescu's main literary tract, Istoria literaturii. Răutu's standing was again recognized in November, when he accompanied Ceaușescu to Moscow for the October Revolution's fiftieth anniversary, and on December 8, when he and Niculescu-Mizil were made supervisors of the Agitprop section. At the central committee plenary of April 1968, Ceaușescu acknowledged Răutu and Valter Roman as rapporteurs on the social and economic education of Romanian youth, which they had deemed unsatisfactory.

In August 1968, Ceaușescu increased his popularity by refusing to sanction the Soviet-led invasion of Czechoslovakia—effectively a standoff with the Soviet Union. As reported by Securitate sources, he came to be well-liked by anti-communist Romanians living in the West, though they feared that the deadlock would end in a Soviet coup, with Răutu at its helm. For his part, Răutu joined other party leaders in condemning the invasion (calling it "an act of great cynicism"). In mid-1969, he was quietly removed from his position within the secretariat, though not from the executive committee. On March 13, 1969, Ceaușescu appointed him deputy prime minister, in charge of supervising education. He served as such until April 24, 1972, when he became rector of Ștefan Gheorghiu Academy. In February 1970, he was officially recommended for membership of the new Academy of Social and Political Sciences, formed by Constantinescu—one of the old Stalinists to be inducted, he served there alongside non-communists such as Daicoviciu, Mihai Berza, and Henri H. Stahl; both he and Constantinescu attempted "a sort of modernization of party propaganda", aimed at getting youth interested in Marxism-Leninism.

Răutu had by then shown personal initiative in interpreting the party line and even anticipated Ceaușescu's ideological permutations. After the July Theses of 1971 put a stop to liberalization and introduced the more repressive phase of national communism, he welcomed Ceaușescu's commands as "a model in Marxist-Leninist analysis" and the subjugation of culture to political economy as "an active, revolutionary, attitude"; he also informed the party that the time had come for himself to reexamine his past and determine his own "mistakes". In late 1972, he supported and obtained a ban on Liviu Ciulei's production of The Government Inspector, which he and other party men regarded as too forward, following a negative report from Baranga. Ciulei himself argued that his work was only targeted because of a "showdown" between Răutu and Popescu-Dumnezeu—since the latter had actively promoted the play. Niculescu-Mizil was Răutu and Iliescu's successor at the Agitprop section, which now ran a more covert form of censorship.

Răutu moved on to the lavishly furnished and overbudgeted Gheorghiu Academy, where Mihail Oișteanu was already serving as a teaching cadre. Here, Răutu set up a "Laboratory for Research into Contemporary Historical Progress", dedicated to defending communist dogma against "the illusion of technocracy". Tismăneanu argues that this think tank was merely "bizarre"; he describes Răutu's theories as "clichés" or "platitudes". In April 1973, Răutu went to East Germany, speaking at an international conference which marked 125 years since The Communist Manifesto. In early September of that year, he attended a meeting of communist-party schools convened by Jan Fojtík and Ladislav Hrzal in Prague; in November, he was in Paris, a guest of the Institut Maurice Thorez. Literary scholar Nicolae Manolescu recalls catching a glimpse of him in the seaside resort of Neptun, at some point in the mid 1970s. He "was sitting in a deckchair, reading French and American magazines. Even back when he was head of agitprop, Leonte Răutu, the intelligent and cultured man that he was, had access to all sources of cultural information that so many Romanian intellectuals could only long for." As rector, Răutu presented the communist leader with a Ph.D. in Politics on Ceaușescu's 60th birthday in January 1978. At that stage Răutu was assigned to the Party and State Committee which organized the 15th International Congress of Historical Sciences (Bucharest, 1980), which Ceaușescu intended to use for broadcasting Dacianist theories.

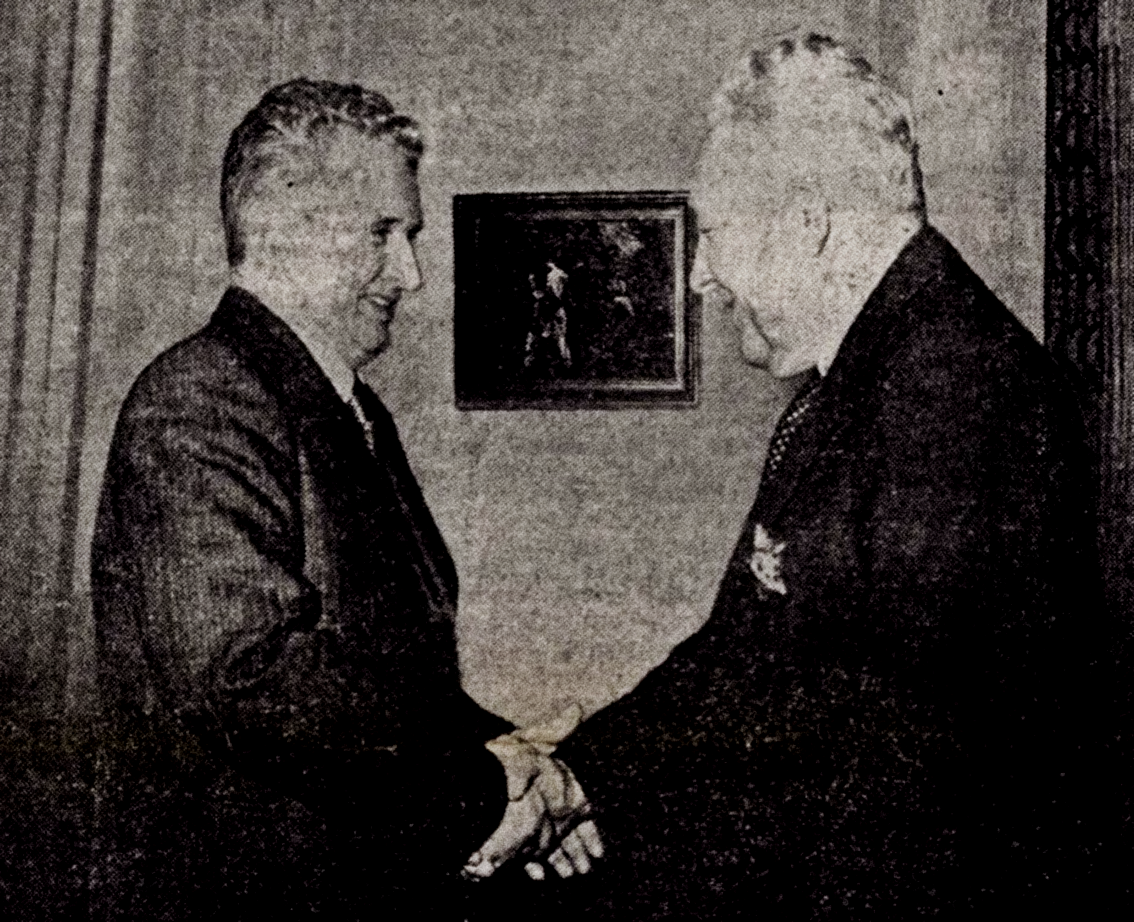
Răutu receiving the Star of the Socialist Republic, 1st Class, from Ceaușescu's hands

In tandem, Răutu continued to serve in the MAN—after elections in March 1975, he served a term for northern Bacău. By January 1979, his regional activity included organizing shows of support for Ceaușescu's policies, involving industrial workers in both Bacău and Borzești. At the XIIth Party Congress in 1979, he issued a spontaneous and violent attack against fellow PCR veteran Constantin Pîrvulescu, who had taken the floor to ad-lib about Ceaușescu's separation from Marxism. In a February 1980 speech that saw print in Scînteia, he gave his retouched version of communist history: claiming to have been one of the first communists to take note of young Ceaușescu's "exceptional courage and brilliant intelligence", he extended his gratitude to "my beloved Comrade Nicolae Ceaușescu" for taking on the role of ideological guide in the eyes of "each and all party activists". Răutu was returned to the MAN during elections in March 1980, this time from the Aiud constituency. That same month, he was assigned to the central committee's commission on Ideology, Politics, Cultural and Socialist Education; in May, he returned as vice president of the Higher Council of Education. Also that year, he received two of Communist Romania's major distinctions: the Star of the Socialist Republic, 1st Class (granted, on his 70th birthday, for merits "in constructing the multilaterally developed socialist society"), and the 25th Anniversary of the Motherland's Liberation Medal.

From the early 1970s, Răutu was practically a widower. Natalia Răutu, plagued by episodic migraines since the 1940s, was diagnosed with viral encephalitis after slipping into a coma; she was kept under specialized care at Elias Hospital but never recovered, dying on January 21, 1975. The former head of Agitprop began noticing that the relatives of various communist potentates were using their relative freedom of travel and defecting to the West. Knowing that his own family had little appreciation for Ceaușescu, he expressed fears that, should the same happen to him, the central committee would never pardon it.

=== Downfall and final years ===
Soviet archives suggest that, from as early as the 1940s, Răutu was one of the Romanian communists who had secretly broken with party discipline by asking Moscow to intervene in Romania's internal problems. In the late 1970s, Brucan spoke at the University of Architecture, where he was openly asked by one student if Romania would ever press at the UN for the return of Bessarabia. According to his own recollections, Brucan entertained the question; this alarmed both the Securitate and Răutu as "irredentist propaganda", but Ceaușescu overruled them, explaining that Brucan had done nothing wrong. A Securitate operative reported in August 1979 that Răutu and Ghizela Vass were perceived by at least one source as nomenklatura contacts for the KGB and the StB. According to such rumors, the two had "friendly meetings" with KGB sources and with each other, discussing "changes to the external agenda of our party and state." In her 2010s recollections, historian Cornelia Bodea accused Răutu and Roman of making repeated attempts to prevent her from publishing evidence that some 40,000 Romanians had been massacred during the Hungarian Revolution of 1848; this incident formed part of renewed tensions between Hungary and Romania, which were carried into the field of history-writing.

Ceaușescu's austerity policy had already caused a rift between Romania and the West, prompting the regime to fall back on a stricter application of Marxist-Leninism. In March 1981, communist potentate Gogu Rădulescu informed his friends that, as a result of this transition, Răutu "jumped up" in political importance. Also that year, Răutu approved a request by Romanian-born scholar Lilly Marcou, who intended to do her research at Ștefan Gheorghiu. As Marcou reports: "[Răutu] allowed me to do my work, and helped me with it. [...] I had a meeting with the heads of departments, with the researchers at [this] institution, and I told them what I believed on what was happening in Romania: that it was a shame and a great bane for the country that all around I saw portraits of the Ceaușescus, that they were all one could see on TV etc. I spoke about that at the very core of the party. No one answered, but neither did they threaten me or contradict me."

Around that time, Răutu's son-in-law Andrei Coler and his daughter Lena applied for emigration to the United States. Reportedly, news of this unprecedented act infuriated Ceaușescu, who "was bedridden for four days on the advice of his doctors"; Răutu himself tried to underscore his loyalty by asking that his relatives' Romanian passports be "frozen". In retribution for the Colers' move, but also accused of not having fulfilled his own political tasks, Răutu was made to present his resignation from the party's central committee; he was also made to renounce his rectorate in August 1981. Officially, his demotion was effective on November 26, which was also the day on which Răutu was removed from the party's executive committee, alongside Virgil Trofin. Niculescu-Mizil, who had advanced to the party's central leadership, recalls his opposition to Răutu's removal, claiming to have personally reminded Ceaușescu that Răutu had fully supported him in 1964. On November 22, 1984, Răutu was also altogether eliminated from the central committee, with his employment being recorded as "publicist" for the final years of his life; he was also no longer presented as a candidate in the MAN elections of 1985.

This ouster left the former ideologist entirely isolated, a recluse on the Romanian political scene. In his report for the exile station Radio Free Europe, Noël Bernard assessed: "Nobody is going to shed tears over the fall of Leonte Răutu." Bernard also derided the communists' hypocrisy: Răutu, he noted, had been forced out because his daughter emigrated; Miron Constantinescu advanced steadily, his own daughter a mentally disturbed matricide. In an October 1984 conversation with literary critic Dan Culcer (published in 1999), sociologist Zoltán Rostás argued that Răutu's ouster marked a peak in Ceaușescu's "Romanianization" policy. According to Rostás, the Ștefan Gheorghiu group was cultivating "Marxist information and criticism", thus hampering the "purity and ideological unity of Ceaușescuist thought"—the experiment required that Răutu be sidelined. Theater historian Mircea Morariu also notes that Răutu was made an example of, whereas Baranga, whose son Harry had also emigrated, had been spared persecution. Tismăneanu adds: "The 'perfect acrobat' [fell] victim to the very dialectical-Balkanic mechanism that he so decisively helped generate [...] Răutu had been thrown into the grim anonymity that had consumed the last years of his so many associates in youthful daydreaming."

Răutu moved out into a regular house of protocol, and worked for the party's own History Institute. His last years were allegedly marked by panic and confusion: although it gave him pleasure to see Ceaușescu being tried and executed during the Romanian Revolution of 1989, that event saw the formal destruction of a political and symbolic structure to which he had dedicated his life. An unverifiable rumor even places him among the dejected old-generation communists who prepared their return under a "Constantin Dăscălescu Government". Reportedly fearing anti-communist repression, Răutu supported Iliescu, his former employee at the Agitprop Section, whom the Revolution had propelled to the rank of President. Iliescu later acknowledged that he felt respect for Răutu. The post-revolutionary republic did not impinge on the privileges he had gained, as an old communist militant, under Gheorghiu-Dej. Legally included in a category of "antifascist combatants", he continued to receive a large pension and was eligible for special medical care. Răutu gave his only in-depth interview to Pierre du Bois, a Swiss political scientist, acknowledging that the communist system had produced tens of thousands of victims but expressing no remorse. He died shortly after, in September 1993, and was cremated at Cenușa furnace, to the tune of The Internationale.

== Legacy ==
According to Vladimir Tismăneanu and Cristian Vasile, who cite various other authors, Răutu was not just responsible for cultural repression, but also for the characteristically "ill-adapted", "dull", and "anti-intellectual" essence of Romanian communist propaganda at all times between 1950 and 1989. According to poet-journalist Radu Cosașu (himself a figure in 1950s literature), Răutu is personally responsible for a slip of the wooden tongue, allowing the notion of Eastern Bloc to be rendered in Romanian as lagărul socialist—which can also be read as "socialist concentration camp". A renegade Stalinist and a defector, Petru Dumitriu, satirized Leonte Răutu (as "Malvolio") and Gheorghiu-Dej (as "Amon Ra") in political novels he wrote abroad. As Dumitriu's anti-hero, Răutu goes from fiery intellectual to corrupt and surfeited bureaucrat. The mid to late 1960s ignited a bookish flare of indignation at home, when some of the intellectuals harmed by Răutu's Stalinist policies took their literary revenge. In 1965, Writers' Union president Zaharia Stancu publicly asked Ceaușescu to let Răutu follow in the trail of Chișinevschi, identifying the former as a Stalinist mastermind. According to Stancu, Chișinevschi had been more of a "dilettante" pawn. After personal tragedy led him to reconsider Stalinism (and possibly communism altogether), poet Eugen Jebeleanu also turned on Răutu. The notion of "perfect acrobat", used by Tismăneanu to qualify Răutu's record as a political survivor, was originally the title of a Jebeleanu piece:

Perfectul acrobat este acela
care n-a călcat niciodată în noroi,
cel care totdeauna este deasupra noastră,
cel care, vinovat fiind, spune 'Vinovați sunteți voi...'

Translation:

A perfect acrobat is that man
who never once has he stepped in the mud,
who is always, at all times, above us,
who, being guilty, will say 'You're the guilty ones...'

Marxist dissident Alexandru Ivasiuc portrayed Răutu (as "Valeriu Trotușeanu") in the novel Cunoaștere de noapte ("Nightly Knowledge"): the fictional cat-like Răutu spins a web of arguments, admitting his minor errors to divert focus from his crimes. Critic Nicolae Dragoș, who was in the process of moving from Stalinism to nationalism, made a point of saluting Ivasiuc's book: his own editorial for the review România Literară carried the unsettling title Te recunosc, domnule Trotușeanu ("I Recognize You, Mr. Trotușeanu"). A more nationalistic indictment of 1950s policies is found in Dinu Săraru's novel Dragostea și revoluția ("Love and Revolution"), where the antagonist, a politico by the name of "Anghel Tocsobie", is probably based on Răutu. In late 1982, Cosașu published the autofictional volume Logica, which features the character "Reznicek", who is possibly a depiction of Răutu.

Presumably, the national communists allowed such works to see print because they helped remind Răutu that he was always under their scrutiny. Although Ceaușescu countersigned Răutu's downfall and allowed a condemnation of Răutu's erstwhile proteges, little was published on the ideologist's own career, and almost no negative reinvestigation saw print before 1989. Researchers such as Ileana Vrancea and Ion Cristoiu, who tackled the more delicate subjects of Stalinist culture and were condemned by the communist press as borderline dissidents, refrained from even mentioning Răutu by name. Benefiting from his seniority in the communist movement, academician Iorgu Iordan made at least one reference to Răutu's problematic decision-making, even before Răutu had been sidelined: Iordan's version of events is preserved in his 1979 memoirs.

Răutu's contribution as a propagandist was entirely absent from official reference works such as the 1978 biographical dictionary of Romanian historiography. Although highly decorated and commended as a positive example, the Agitprop Section founder was generally introduced as a dedicated "party activist", a communist powerhouse rather than a national instructor: while honoring him with the Star of the Socialist Republic, Ceaușescu made sure to remind the audience that Răutu's history had its share of "minuses and unfulfilled chapters". A controversial perspective on Răutu's public role and legacy was taken up from the late 1980s, with roots in the 1960s, by journalists and critics such as Eugen Barbu and Mihai Ungheanu. Such authors, criticized in turn as xenophobic and even antisemitic, suggest that there was a Jewish-and-communist conspiracy against the very spirit of Romanian culture. This lobby, associated for a while with the journal Luceafărul, was tolerated by Ceaușescu as the radical facet of his national communism: Barbu and fellow novelist Ion Lăncrănjan, who had debuted as orthodox Stalinists and had won Răutu's approval, became proponents of the neotraditionalist revival. In contrast to theirs, largely positive assessments of Răutu survive in memoirs and interviews by Iliescu and by his Agitprop Section successor, Dumitru Popescu-Dumnezeu.

Răutu's daughter Anca Oroveanu and her husband Mihai Oroveanu stayed behind in Romania after the Colers left for America, and continued to visit Răutu. Mihai Oroveanu, a noted art photographer, is a co-founder of the National Museum of Contemporary Art. Anca Oroveanu is an art historian, known for her studies in postmodern art; reportedly, in the early 1990s she was publicly scorned for her origins. Writing at the time, essayist and former dissident Dorin Tudoran noted that the attack was antisemitic, whereas pointing out that Leonte Răutu happened to be Jewish was not antisemitic. Răutu's nephews are anthropologist Andrei Oișteanu and poet Valery Oisteanu; the latter directly challenged his uncle by promoting the literary avant-garde in the 1960s. Leonte-s niece Nadia Brunstein (Dan Răutu's daughter) has translated Yevgeny Yevtushenko's poetry into Romanian.
