= Doftana prison =

Prison in Romania

Coordinates: 45°08′12″N 25°46′24″E

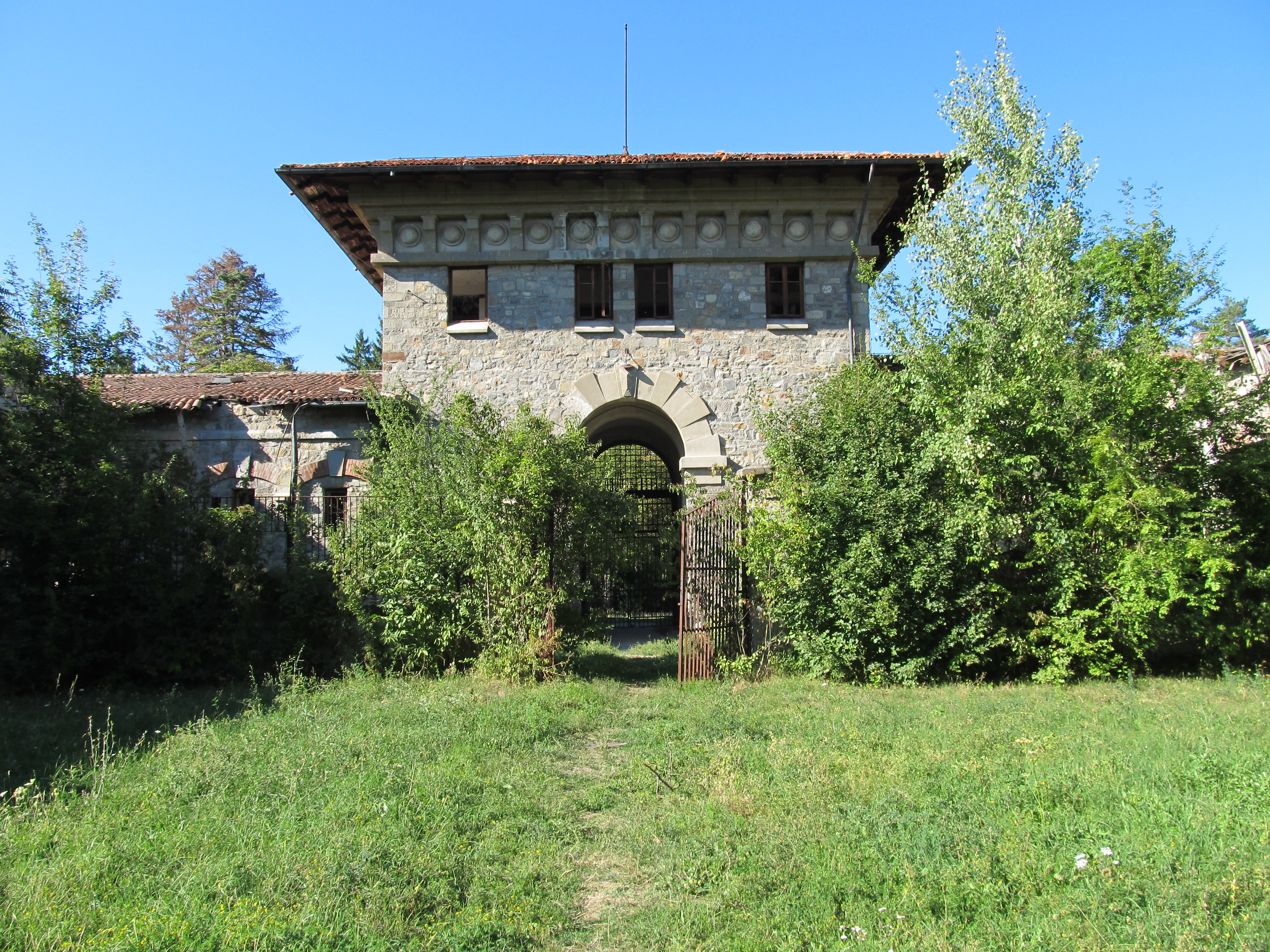
Doftana today

Doftana was a Romanian prison, sometimes referred to as "the Romanian Bastille". Now a ruin, it was built in 1895 in connection with nearby salt mines. Beginning in 1921 it was used to detain political prisoners, among them Max Goldstein, a revolutionary whose detonation of an explosive device in the Romanian Senate chamber in December 1920 prompted widespread suppression and detention of political radicals, including Gheorghe Gheorghiu-Dej, who was later the Prime Minister of Romania (1952–1955), and the Chairman of the State Council of Romania (1961–1965), and Nicolae Ceaușescu, who went on to be General Secretary of Romanian Communist Party (1965–1989), and the first President of Romania (1974–1989).

The prison ruins are situated close to the village of Doftana, in the Telega commune of Prahova County.

== Newspapers & Museums ==
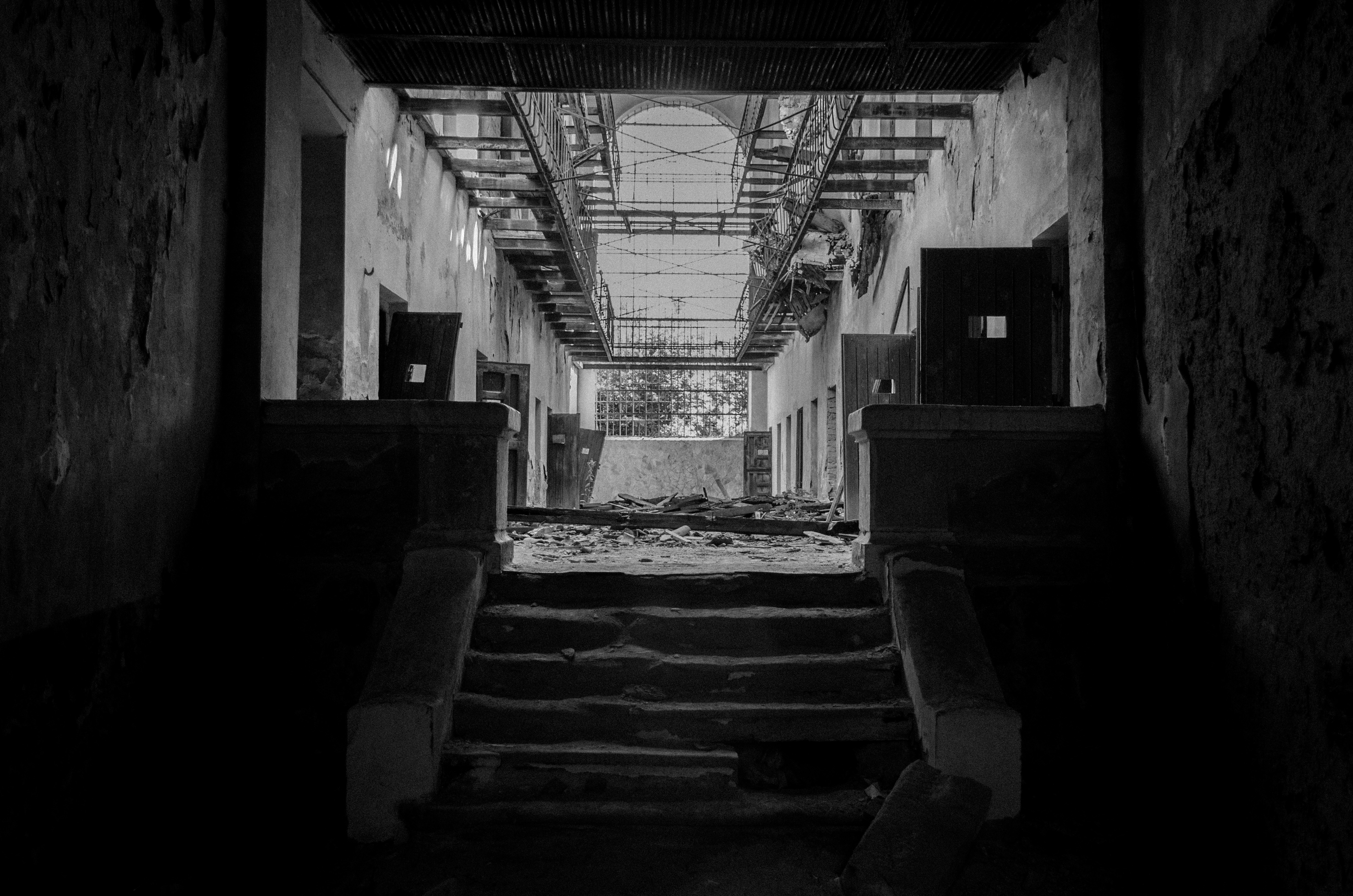
Interior of Doftana Prison

Beginning in 1924, inmates wrote and edited a newspaper by hand using paper slips and smuggled pencils. It went by various names such as Doftana Red and Bolsheviks Handcuffed.

During Romania's communist period just after World War II, it was converted into a museum, but eventually deserted because of a lack of funding.. The composer Alfred Mendelssohn composed a symphonic poem about it, called The Destruction of Doftanas.

Not only Romanian communists were imprisoned there, but also captured German and Soviet soldiers and Hungarian civilians.

== Notable inmates ==
- Gheorghe Apostol
- Iosif Ardeleanu
- Max Auschnitt
- Emil Bodnăraș
- Béla Breiner
- Mihail Gheorghiu Bujor
- Nicolae Ceaușescu
- Corneliu Zelea Codreanu
- Petre Constantinescu-Iași
- Alexandru Drăghici
- Ștefan Foriș
- Gheorghe Gheorghiu-Dej
- Max Goldstein
- Mozes Kahana
- Șmil Marcovici
- Alexandru Moghioroș
- Serghei Nicolau
- Ion Niculi
- Dumitru Petrescu
- Gheorghe Pintilie
- Grigore Preoteasa
- Leonte Răutu
- Horia Sima
- Boris Stefanov
- Chivu Stoica
- Richard Wurmbrand
- Belu Zilber
