= Leon Lichtblau =

Romanian militant and Soviet statistician

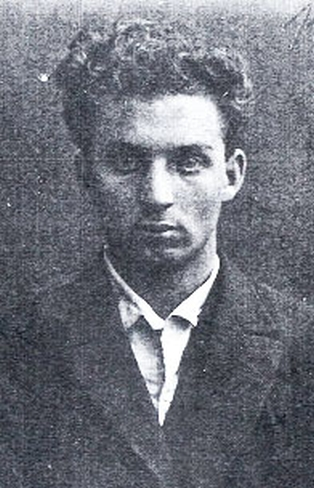
Leon Lichtblau

Leon Sigismundovich Lichtblau (Russian: Леон Сигизмундович Лихтблау, also known as Adolf Ivanovich Kristin, Russian: Адольф Иванович Кристин; August 23, 1901 – April 25, 1938) was a Romanian socialist and communist militant, and Soviet statistician of Jewish origin who was executed during the Great Purge.

He was born in Bucharest, Romania, in the family of a Jewish architect. While studying at Gheorghe Lazăr High School, he attended the scientific conferences organised by the local folk university. Here he met and befriended several young workers, who introduced him to socialists ideas. In 1918, when socialist militants Gheorghe Cristescu, Alecu Constantinescu, and Ecaterina Arbore were arrested by the German authorities occupying southern Romania, Leon was one of the organisers of a public demonstration demanding their release. He was also a participant in the manifestations which accompanied the departure of the German Army, being noted for his pro-revolutionary and anti-monarchical chants.

On December 13, 1918 Leon Lichtblau was arrested along with other militants during a large workers' demonstration in Bucharest. Sent to trial for "rebellion and unrest", he was reproached by the presiding judge for his political opinions. To the judge's allegation that students, and people of intellectual background in general, shouldn't be taking part in the socialist movement, he replied by reading a list of socialist leaders, whom he identified as his role models. In 1920, after completing high school, he enrolled in the University of Bucharest's Faculty of Mathematics. In the same year he accommodated anarchist Max Goldstein while the latter was preparing for the bombing of the Romanian Senate.

In 1921 he went to Iași to support the local workers' movement, but soon returned to Bucharest, narrowly escaping arrest during the crackdown on the Socialist Conference taking place in the former city. Back in Bucharest he participated in the May 1921 Congress of the Socialist Party of Romania, where he supported the party's affiliation with the Comintern. In the summer of that year he was part of the Romanian delegation to the Second Congress of the Young Communist International in Moscow. On his return to Romania he found out that the authorities were offering a 200,000 lei reward for his and others communists' capture, and went into hiding. On October 15, the 2nd Army Corps issued an arrest warrant on his name. Pressure was put on his family to reveal his location, his home was repeatedly searched, his brother interrogated, while his sister was forced to sign a declaration condemning Leon's activities to be allowed to finish her studies at the Bucharest Conservatory. Leon Lichtblau eventually fled the country, staying in Vienna, and, after being expelled from Austria, in Berlin. In 1922, as part of the Dealul Spirii Trial, he was sentenced in absentia to lifetime forced labour, and another arrest warrant was issued for him.

Not able to return to Romania, Leon settled in Moscow, adopting the pseudonym Adolf Cristin. Here he graduated in economics from the Institute of Red Professors in 1926, later becoming the head of the Industry Department of the Central Office of Economic Accounting of the USSR. At the request of the communists in Romania, he translated a part of Vladimir Lenin's works in Romanian, under the coordination of David Fabian. For a short time in 1928 he was a member in Political Bureau of the Central Committee of the Communist Party of Romania, along with fellow exiles Fabian and Elek Köblös.

He was arrested on April 5, 1937, during the Stalinist purges. On April 25, 1938 he was indicted with "spying and provocative activities and membership in a right-wing counter-revolutionary organisation", and was executed on the same day. Leon Lichtblau was posthumously rehabilitated by a decision of the Soviet Supreme Court on October 3, 1956, as well as by a commission of the Romanian Communist Party in 1968.
