= Iosif Ardeleanu =

Romanian communist activist and bureaucrat

Iosif Ardeleanu (born Adler Döme, September 25, 1909 – July 26, 1988) was an Austro-Hungarian-born Romanian communist activist and bureaucrat.

He was born into a Hungarian-Jewish family in Salonta. After World War I, he moved with his family to Oradea, where he completed his secondary studies. In 1928 he went to Timișoara, where he was employed for 6 years by an iron commerce firm. During that time he changed his name and married his first wife, Gherghina. Ardeleanu joined the Romanian Communist Party (PCR) in 1933, while it was banned, and was a militant in Timișoara, tasked with Agitprop by the party. Arrested in 1934, he was incarcerated for 5 years at prisons in Timișoara, Caransebeș, and Doftana. From 1939 to 1941, he was the PCR Secretary for the Yellow Sector of Bucharest. During World War II, Ardeleanu was detained at the Târgu Jiu internment camp for political prisoners, together with Gheorghe Gheorghiu-Dej, and also at the Vapniarka concentration camp and in Grosulovo.

After 1944 he divorced his first wife and in the early 1950s he married Clara Turcu, a manager at the Foreign Ministry under Ana Pauker. As head of the General Press and Typography Directorate from 1951 to 1973, Ardeleanu was one of the chief enforcers of censorship in Communist Romania. His obtuseness, intolerance and dogmatism became legendary. Between 1956 and 1958, he was part of a team that investigated and monitored the ousted Imre Nagy-led Hungarian government being held under arrest at Snagov. He retired in 1973 and died in 1988 in Bucharest.
