= Max Goldstein =

Romanian revolutionary (1898–1924)

Max Goldstein

Max Goldstein (1898–1924), also known as Coca, was a Romanian revolutionary, variously described as a communist and an anarchist, who carried out the first terrorist attacks in Romania.

== Biography ==
Born in Bârlad to a poor Jewish family, he worked as a clerk for two years. He later moved to Bucharest in 1916, where he became a Communist sympathizer. Sentenced to 10 years in prison, he escaped and fled to Odessa (part of Imperial Russia at the time), returning with money and new instructions. He lost a hand, presumably while doing experiments with explosives, and replaced it with a hook, being known to the police as the "man with the hook".

On 17 November 1920, Max Goldstein attempted to kill the Minister of Internal Affairs, Constantin Argetoianu, who was Romania's most vocal anti-Communist politician. The attempt, however, failed: the bomb placed under Argetoianu's train coach destroyed the empty half of the coach. For this attack, he received support from Bolshevik groups, who gave him 12,000 lei.

On 8 December 1920, Goldstein, with the support Leon Lichtblau and Saul Ozias, organized another politically motivated bombing. Their improvised explosive device, made from an unexploded German 76 mm artillery shell from World War I, and placed in front of the Romanian Senate, killed Minister of Justice Dimitrie Greceanu and two senators (Demetriu Radu and Spirea Gheorghiu), and wounded the president of the Senate, Constantin Coandă. The government alleged that their group did not act alone, and that it would have had among its accomplices Alecu Constantinescu, a leader of the left group of the Socialist Party, which in 1921 split and formed the Romanian Communist Party (under the provisional name of Socialist-Communist Party).

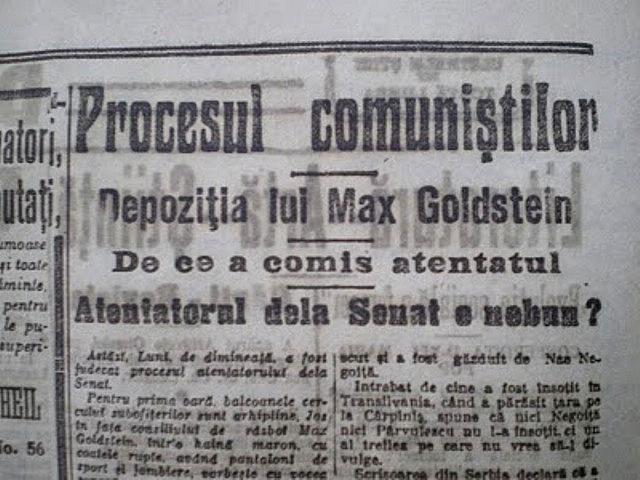
1922 newspaper article on Max Goldstein's testimony regarding the terrorist bombing

The bombing was used by the Romanian government as an excuse to put into custody all known communists, who were implicated in the Dealul Spirii Trial (named after Dealul Spirii, the hill on which the Senate building stood), and ban communist political activity. Communist leader Gheorghe Cristescu rejected all accusations of conspiracy, and the matter of the Party's involvement is still unclear. During his stand on trial, Cristescu argued that Goldstein's actions were inspired by Anarchism more than anything else.

Right after the December 1920 bombing, Goldstein fled to Bulgaria. In October 1921, he was arrested while trying to enter Romania from Ruse, and on 28 June 1922, he was sentenced to life imprisonment. He died in 1924 in Doftana prison following a 32-day hunger strike.

== See also ==
- List of Romanian communists
- List of communists imprisoned by the Kingdom of Romania
