= Malmaison =

Malmaison may refer to:

- Château de Malmaison, last residence of Napoleon, Rueil-Malmaison, a western suburb of Paris, France
- Greenwood LeFlore's home, Greenwood, Mississippi, USA
- Malmaison (hotel chain), a UK hotel chain
- Malmaison Prison in Romania, where enemies of the Communist regime such as Maria Antonescu and Silviu Craciunas were held
- Rueil-Malmaison, a town in France and suburb of Paris
