= Hungarian People's Party =

Former political party in Romania

The Hungarian People's Party (Romanian: Partidul Popular Maghiar, PPM) was a political party in Romania.

== History ==
The party ran in alliance with the National Peasants' Party in the 1928 general elections. The alliance won 348 seats in the Chamber of Deputies, of which the PPM took two.

== Electoral history ==
=== Legislative elections ===
Election	Chamber			Senate			Position
Election	Votes	%	Seats	Votes	%	Seats	Position
1928	Part of PNȚ-led alliance		2 / 387			0 / 110	
