= 1928 Romanian general election =

General election held in Romania (1928)

- 12–19 December 1928

All 387 seats in the Chamber of Deputies All 113 seats in the Senate
- Turnout: 77.37%
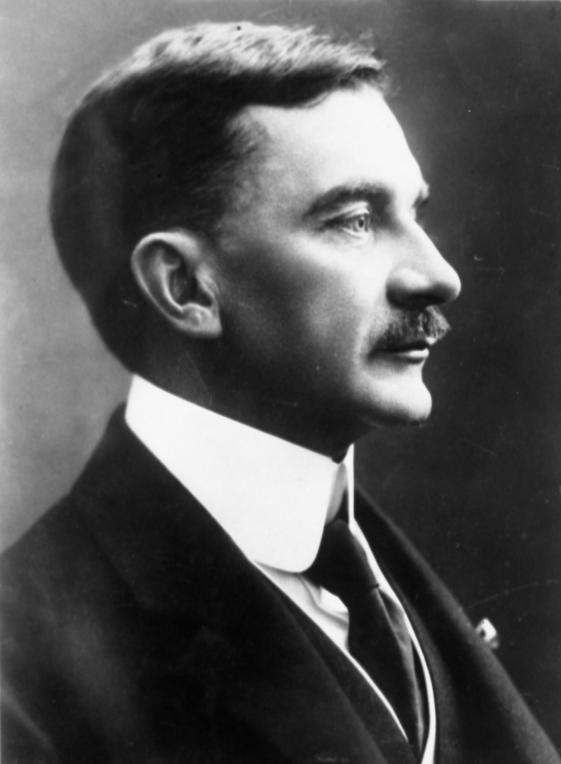

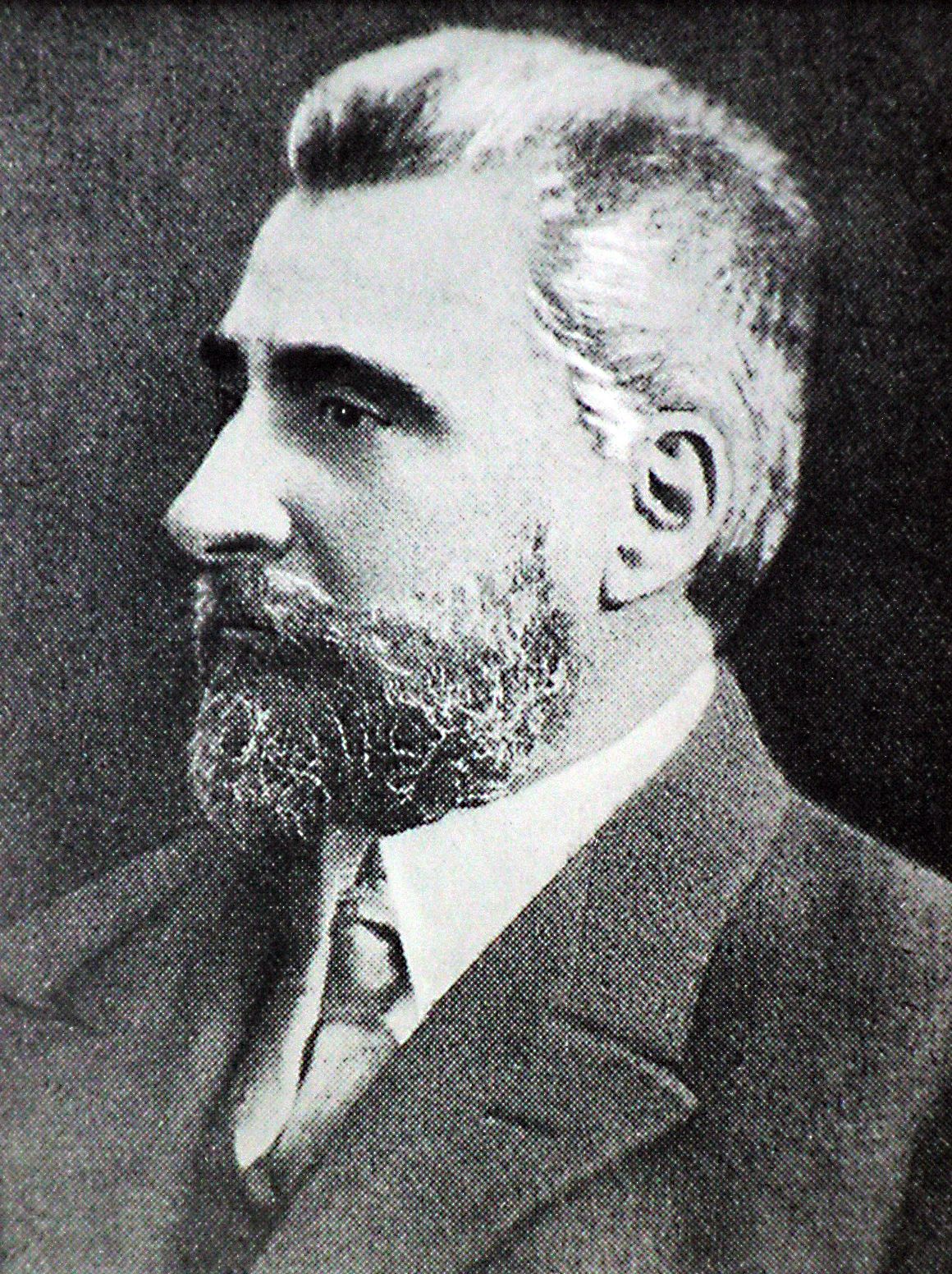

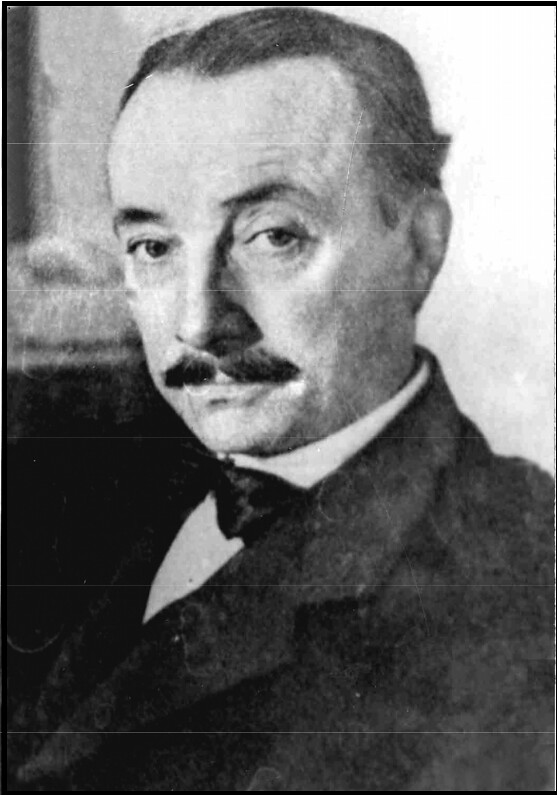
	First party	Second party	Third party
Leader	Iuliu Maniu	Vintilă Brătianu	György Bethlen
Party	PNȚ-led alliance	PNL	PM
Leader since	10 October 1926 (party foundation)	24 November 1927	1 April 1926
Last election	17 S / 54 D	92 S / 318 D	1 S / 15 D
Seats won	105 S / 348 D	0 S / 13 D	3 S / 16 D
Seat change	▲88 S / ▲294 D	▼92 S / ▼305 D	▲2 S / ▲1 D
Popular vote	2,208,922 D	185,939 D	172,699 D
Percentage	77.76%	6.55%	6.08%
Prime Minister before election
Iuliu Maniu
PNȚ
Subsequent Prime Minister
Iuliu Maniu
PNȚ

General elections were held in Romania in December 1928. Immediately after acceding to power, the National Peasants' Party (PNȚ) prepared the next elections. The lists were filed before the local Courts before 26 November, while voting took place for the Chamber on 12 December, the Universal College of the Senate on 15 December, the local/county councils (Senate) on 17 December, and the Chamber of Industries and Commerce (Senate) on 19 December.

The elections were strongly contested by the National Liberal Party (PNL). The liberal papers ran articles like "Organised gangs led by those that are supposed to 'organise' the elections, attack people both in towns as in the country, without any fear of authority, on the contrary...". On the other hand, the PNȚ press claimed that "Such elections have not yet been organised in our country. For the first time ever we can see with our own eyes truly free elections. Not a single quarrel, not a single pressure, not a single involvement of the law enforcing officers."

The truth was somewhere in the middle. The Liberals were right in that the PNȚ misused the national budget to sponsor their own electoral campaign, as well as they abusively closed many local and county Councils (for instance, the decision of closing 23 local councils in a single county, Vlașca, was invalidated at the appeal, yet the elections have not been rerun). On the other hand, the PNȚ also had their own piece of truth, in that liberty and peace was granted more than ever before in election times (the reputed historian Nicolae Iorga wrote in his journal, later to be published under the title of Memorii, for the date of 12 December a very short but relevant note: "Lifeless elections"; a similar note under the date of 15: "Dead calm elections for the Senate."), although there have been quite a few scandals, in particular during the campaign.

== Results ==
=== Chamber of Deputies ===
Of the 348 Chamber seats won by the National Peasants' Party list, the National Peasants' Party took 326, the Social Democratic Party nine, the German Party eight, the Hungarian People's Party two, while three were given to Jewish candidates. The Social Democratic Party allocated its nine seats to: Ioan Flueraș, Iosif Jumanca, Romulus Dan, Eftimie Gherman, Lothar Rădăceanu, Ion Mirescu, Alexandru Lucian, I. Rusnac and Iacob Pistiner.

Party	Votes	%	Seats
National Peasants' Party	2,208,922	79.25	348
National Liberal Party	185,939	6.67	13
Magyar Party	172,699	6.20	16
Peasants' Party–Lupu	70,506	2.53	5
National Party–People's Party	70,490	2.53	5
Peasant Workers' Bloc	38,351	1.38	0
National-Christian Defense League	32,273	1.16	0
National Liberal Party dissidents	6,473	0.23	0
Merchant Council Group (Olt)	877	0.03	0
Independent groups	900	0.03	0
Total	2,787,430	100.00	387
Valid votes	2,787,430	98.13	
Invalid/blank votes	53,249	1.87	
Total votes	2,840,679	100.00	
Registered voters/turnout	3,671,352	77.37	
Source: Monitorul oficial

=== Senate ===
Party	Seats		
Party	Universal College	Local and county councils	Total
National Peasants' Party	110	52	162
National Liberal Party	0	16	16
Magyar Party	3	3	3
Institutional senators (Note: Senators proposed and, if necessary, elected by their own institutions)	–	–	16
Rightful senators (Note: Appointed senators provided for by special provisions of the constitution and electoral law, including the crown prince, generals, legally recognised religious leaders, generals, and academics.)	–	–	–
Total	113	71	197
Source: Monitorul oficial
