= National Peasants' Party =

Romanian political party, 1926-1947

National Peasants' Party Partidul Național Țărănesc
- Logo of the PNȚ used in 1933, featuring a circle (the main electoral symbol) with an icon of a peasant and oxen ploughing a field
- President: Iuliu Maniu (1926–1931, 1932–1933, 1937–1947); Alexandru Vaida-Voevod (1933–1935); Ion Mihalache (1931–1932, 1935–1937)
- Founded: 10 October 1926; 99 years ago
- Dissolved: 29 July 1947; 79 years ago (formal; informal existence to December 1989)
- Merger of: Romanian National Party; Peasants' Party
- Succeeded by: Christian Democratic National Peasants' Party
- Headquarters: Clemenceau Street 6, Bucharest (1944–1946)
- Newspaper: Dreptatea and eight others (1945)
- Paramilitary wing: Peasant Guards
- Youth wing: Tineretul Național Țărănesc (1926–1945); Organizația M (1945–1947)
- Proletarian wing: PNȚ Workers' Organization
- Membership: 2.12 million (1947 est.)
- Ideology: Agrarianism Majority positions: Cultural nationalism (Romanian); Republicanism (1927–1928); Monarchism (from 1928); National conservatism; Economic liberalism; Developmentalism; Regionalism; Anti-fascism; Anti-communism; Europeanism; Balkan federalism; Minority positions: Poporanism; Social corporatism; Agrarian socialism; Cooperatism; Dirigisme; National liberalism (Romanian); Nativism; Antimagyarism; Scientific racism; Christian democracy
- Political position: Centre-left to centre-right (de jure); Syncretic (de facto)
- National affiliation: Bloc of Democratic Parties (1944)
- International affiliation: Green International (1927–?); Radical International (1929–1938); Romanian National Committee (1949–1975); Romanian National Council (1975–1989); Christian Democrat World Union (1987–1989)
- Colours: Green Red
- Anthem: Cântecul țăranilor

Party flag

The National Peasants' Party (also known as the National Peasant Party or National Farmers' Party; Romanian: Partidul Național Țărănesc, or Partidul Național-Țărănist, PNȚ) was an agrarian political party in the Kingdom of Romania. It was formed in 1926 through the fusion of the Romanian National Party (PNR), a conservative-regionalist group centred on Transylvania, and the Peasants' Party (PȚ), which had coalesced the left-leaning agrarian movement in the Old Kingdom and Bessarabia. The definitive PNR–PȚ merger came after a decade-long rapprochement, producing a credible contender to the dominant National Liberal Party (PNL). National Peasantists agreed on the concept of a "peasant state", which defended smallholding against state capitalism or state socialism, proposing voluntary cooperative farming as the basis for economic policy. Peasants were seen as the first defence of Romanian nationalism and of the country's monarchic regime, sometimes within a system of social corporatism. Regionally, the party expressed sympathy for Balkan federalism and rallied with the International Agrarian Bureau; internally, it championed administrative decentralization and respect for minority rights, as well as, briefly, republicanism. It remained factionalized on mainly ideological grounds, leading to a series of defections.

With its attacks on the PNL establishment, the PNȚ came to endorse an authoritarian monarchy, mounting no resistance to a conspiracy which brought Carol II on the Romanian throne in 1930. Over the following five years, Carol manoeuvred against the PNȚ, which opposed his attempts to subvert liberal democracy. PNȚ governments were in power for most of the time between 1928 and 1933, with the leader Iuliu Maniu as its longest-serving Prime Minister. Supported by the Romanian Social Democrats, they expanded Romania's welfare state, but failed to tackle the Great Depression, and organized clampdowns against radicalized workers at Lupeni and Grivița. This issue brought Maniu into conflict with the outlawed Romanian Communist Party, though the PNȚ, and in particular its left, favored a Romanian popular front. From 1935, most of the centrist wing embraced anti-fascism, outvoting the PNȚ's far-right, which split of as a Romanian Front, under Alexandru Vaida-Voevod; in that interval, the PNȚ set up pro-democratic paramilitary units, or Peasant Guards. However, the party signed a temporary cooperation agreement with the fascist Iron Guard ahead of national elections in 1937, sparking much controversy among its own voters.

The PNȚ was banned under the National Renaissance Front (1938–1940), which also absorbed its centrists. Regrouped under Maniu, it remained active throughout World War II as an underground organization, tolerated by successive fascist regimes, but supportive of the Allied Powers; it also organized protests against the deportation of minorities and for the return of Northern Transylvania. Together with the PNL and the communists, it executed the Coup of August 1944, emerging as the most powerful party of the subsequent democratic interlude (1944–1946). In this final period, National Peasantists were repressed as instigators of anti-communist resistance. The PNȚ was registered as having lost the fraudulent elections in 1946, and was banned following the "Tămădău Affair" of 1947. The communist regime imprisoned its members in large numbers, though some on the pro-communist left were allowed to go free. Both Maniu and his more leftist deputy, Ion Mihalache, died in prison.

PNȚ cells were revived in the Romanian diaspora by youth leaders such as Ion Rațiu, and had representation within the Romanian National Committee. The release of political prisoners also allowed the PNȚ to claim existence inside Romania. Corneliu Coposu emerged as the underground leader of this tendency, which was admitted into the Christian Democrat World Union. Its legal successor, called Christian Democratic National Peasants' Party, was one of the first registered political groups after the December 1989 Revolution.

== History ==
=== Formation ===
Future PNȚ leader Maniu had had his first government experience during the union of Transylvania with Romania. In alliance with the Transylvanian Socialists, his PNR had organized a Transylvanian Directorate, which functioned as that region's transitional government to April 1920. This body was explicitly against regional autonomy, and its distinct initiatives were in the field of social welfare. As regional Minister of Social Welfare, the PNR doctor Iuliu Moldovan introduced eugenics, which also appeared as nativism in the political thought a PNR leader, Alexandru Vaida-Voevod. Based in the Romanian Old Kingdom, the Peasants' Party was founded in December 1918 by schoolteacher Ion Mihalache, with assistance from academics such as Virgil Madgearu and Dimitrie Gusti. The group soon established itself in Bessarabia, also recently united with Romania. This was due to it absorbing much of the Bessarabian Peasants' Party (PȚB), under Pan Halippa and Constantin Stere. In 1921, the PȚ had been joined by Nicolae L. Lupu, formerly of the Labor Party.

In 1919–1920, the PNR was able to outmaneuver the PNL, and, backed by the PȚ, formed Romania's national government, headed by Vaida-Voevod. Mihalache was personally involved in drafting the land reform project, taking a revolutionary stand which greatly increased the proportion of smallholders. Vaida's cabinet was brought down by King Ferdinand I, who openly favored the National Liberals. The PNL's return to power came with the adoption of a new constitution, and with the enactment of land reform, which massively expanded Romania's smallholding class. The latter had an unintended consequence in that it created an electoral pool for the opposition parties; it also gave Peasantists hopes that Romania's economy could still be built around peasant consumers. At this stage, both the PȚ and the PNR were opposed to the Constitution, seeing it as imposed on the Romanian public by the PNL, and arguing that it left the country open to future abuse of power. PNR absorbed another PȚB faction, led by Ion Pelivan, in 1923.

The two opposition groups embarked on a long series of negotiations, eventually producing a set of principles for merger. They began in May 1924, as informal talks between Stere and the PNR's Vasile Goldiș, resulting in a preliminary agreement that June. During this process, the PȚ shed much of its radical platform. However, left-wing Peasantists supported their ideologue Stere, who had a controversial past, for a leadership position in the unified body. This proposal was strongly opposed by figures on the PNR's right-wing such as Vaida and Voicu Nițescu. The unification was only made possible once Mihalache "sacrificed" Stere. The two-party collaboration was successfully tested during the August 1925 elections for the Agricultural Chambers, a professional consultative body. In the local election of early 1926, both parties ran a United Opposition Bloc, in conjunction with Alexandru Averescu's People's Party (PP); also joining them was a Peasant Workers' Bloc (BMȚ), which acted as a legal front for clandestine Romanian Communist Party (PCdR). The PP withdrew from this pact once Averescu was called by Ferdinand to take power. Maniu was a first choice, but eventually discarded for his association with Mihalache, whom Ferdinand regarded as a dangerous radical.

National-and-Peasantist electoral pools, based on results for the Assembly of Deputies elections of 1926 and 1927; regionally divided: green is Transylvania and the Banat; orange is the Romanian Old Kingdom and Bukovina; red is Bessarabia. Lightest shade show at least one deputy elected; intermediary shade – first place in either election; darkest shade – first place in both elections (only available in green: Alba and Someș)

Weakened when Goldiș and others defected to the PP, the PNR became "second-fiddle" to the Peasantist caucus. In the subsequent national election of June, the PNR and PȚ formed a National–Peasant Bloc, which took 27% of the vote and 69 seats in the Assembly of Deputies. As the PȚ agreed to a full merger, the PNR lost support from Nicolae Iorga's semi-independent faction, who went on to reestablish itself as a Democratic Nationalist Party. The fusion was enshrined at a PNR–PȚ congress on October 10, 1926. Also then, Maniu was voted in as chairman; Mihalache, Lupu, Vaida-Voevod and Paul Brătășanu were vice presidents, while Madgearu became general secretary and Mihai Popovici cashier. Its central committee included Constantin Stere, Pantelimon Halippa and Ion Pelivan. From October 17, 1927, the party central organ became Dreptatea, though the party continued to publish various other periodicals, including Patria. On November 21 of that year, the party was admitted into the International Agrarian Bureau.

The National–Peasantist fusion could not lead to an immediate challenge to the PNL supremacy. The party dropped to 22% and 54 deputies after the June 1927 election. With Ferdinand terminally ill, it reluctantly backed Barbu Știrbey's nominally independent cabinet, which was in practice a National Liberal front. Its leadership also rejected a pact with Averescu's group, pushing Averescu further into political insignificance. These events also overlapped with a dynastic crisis: after Ferdinand's death in July 1927, the throne went to his minor grandson Michael I—Michael's disgraced father Carol II having been forced to renounce his claim and pushed into exile. The arrangement was resented by both the PNL and the PNR. For different reasons, both groups sketched out plans to depose Michael and turn Romania into a republic.

The unexpected death of PNL chairman Ion I. C. Brătianu pushed the PNȚ back into full-blown opposition: "All hopes [...] focused on the democratic movement of renewal, outstandingly represented by Iuliu Maniu." The party withdrew its elected representatives and pushed citizens to engage in tax resistance. In creating a web of tactical alliances, it reconfirmed its pact with the BMȚ, while still shunning the PP. The PNȚ's first general congress was held on May 6, 1928 at Alba Iulia. It marked an early peak of PNȚ revolutionary activity, gathering between 100,000 and 200,000 supporters. Observers expected that the columns would then "march on Bucharest", by analogy with the March on Rome. This never happened, but the showing impressed the Regents into deposing the PNL cabinet and handing power to Maniu. Carol reportedly watched on as the events unfolded: at the time, Maniu "remain[ed] silent" as to whether he would back him for the throne. In fact, Maniu and Aurel Leucuția promised him the PNȚ's backing if he accepted a set of conditions, including un-divorcing Helen of Greece; Carol reluctantly agreed. Maniu was adamant that Carol's mistress Elena Lupescu stay exiled, and for this reason earned the Prince's eternal enmity.

=== PNȚ cabinets ===
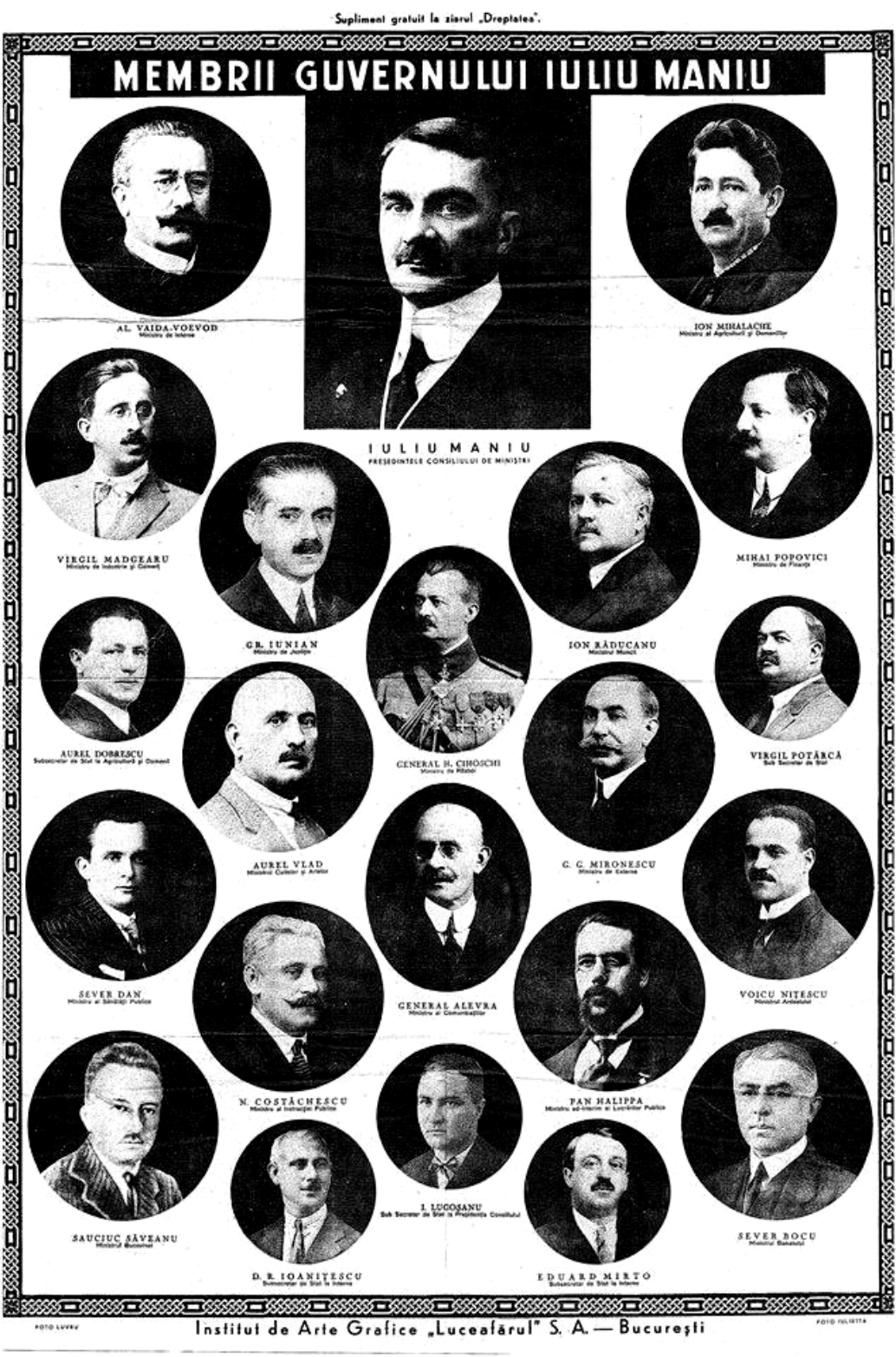
Maniu and his government team in 1928

Maniu was sworn in as Prime Minister on October 10, 1928, leading the first of eight PNȚ government teams. This saw an extension of the welfare state and the regulation of labor through collective bargaining. Maniu's first cabinet had Moldovan as Labor Minister, using this position to advance his program in "biopolitics". His tenure saw the adoption of laws which set the working day at a maximum 10 hours and limited child labor; the effort to unify social insurance was completed in 1933. Endorsed by the Social Democratic Party (PSDR), this government team was put to the test during the December 1928 elections, which are often recognized as free from abuse and government interference, and which it still won in a landslide—with almost 78% of the vote. This result was partly owed to its alliance with the PSDR, the Jewish National People's Party, the German Party, and the Ukrainian Nationalists. At this early stage, the PNȚ was fully controlled by Maniu, who ordered PNȚ members of Parliament to sign resignations that he would file and enact upon in case of insubordination.

In June 1930, a trans-party group of Carlist supporters engineered a coup against the Regency, which ended with Carol's return and enthronement. The PNȚ briefly divided itself into backers of the coup and those who, like Maniu, remained more cautious. From July 1930, Carlist ideologue Nae Ionescu proposed a National Peasantist "mass dictatorship", which implied dissolving all other parties. Such ideas were contained by Maniu, who spoke out in favor of maintaining and cultivating electoral democracy, and by Carol, who would have rather formed a multi-party coalition. Ionescu's dictatorial optimism was published just as the Carol was antagonizing the PNȚ mainstream. Soon after his victory, the new King informed Maniu that he did not intend to honor his promises, causing a rift between monarch and government; Maniu resigned, was persuaded to return within days, and then resigned for good in October, handing the premiership to party colleague Gheorghe Mironescu.

Historian Barbara Jelavich sees Maniu's resignation as "ill-considered", effectively leaving Romania's electorate without an administration that "best represented [its] option". Carol ultimately asked Mironescu to resign in April 1931, and replaced him with Iorga, who led a minority cabinet. The National Peasantists were defeated by their PNL rivals in the election of June 1931, taking just 15% of the vote. Again called to power, with Vaida at the helm, they had a comeback with the early election of 1932, taking 40%. Carol persuaded Maniu to become Prime Minister in October. He resigned again in January 1933, after a row with Carol, who wanted Mihalache stripped of his post at Internal Affairs. Vaida returned as PNȚ Prime Minister, holding on to that position until November 13. Maniu had stepped down as PNȚ leader in June 1931, leaving Mihalache in charge to July of the following year; he then returned and held on to his seat to January 1933, when he was replaced by Vaida. Maniu and his supporters were now in the minority, issuing reprimands against Vaida's alliance with Carol.

Despite its unprecedented success, the party was pushed into a defensive position by the Great Depression, and failed to enact many its various policy proposals; its support by workers and left-wing militants was affected during the strike actions of Lupeni and Grivița, which its ministers repressed with noted expediency. The former incident in particular was received as a shock by working-class voters, and led journalist Romulus Cioflec to hand in his resignation from the party, in what became a public scandal. All PNȚ cabinets were also confronted by the rise of revolutionary fascism, heralded by the Iron Guard. The latter's "Captain", Corneliu Zelea Codreanu, took up elements from the PNȚ program and planned ahead for its downfall. In 1932, PNȚ enjoys approached the newly formed National Socialist Party with an offer to share electoral lists; the offer was rejected. National Peasantism also met competition from a hard-right version of itself: the National Agrarian Party, formed by Octavian Goga (a poet and activist, once affiliated with the PNR).

From 1931, PNȚ ministers issued regulations banning the Guard, but these proved unsuccessful. This interval witnessed the first clashes between the PNȚ and the Guardists, including one at Vulturu. A first effort at organizing a self-defense force for PNȚ politicians resulted in the 1928 "civic guards". In 1929, the party had begun organizing another set of squads, called Voinici ("Braves"). Originally integrated with the youth organization, they later became a nucleus for the paramilitary Peasant Guards. By that time, Maniu's guidelines had eroded left-wing support for the party. In February 1927, Lupu and Ion Buzdugan founded a rival group, the Peasants' Party–Lupu. Stere was finally expelled from the PNȚ after a heated controversy in 1930. In 1931, he established an agrarian socialist group called Democratic Peasants' Party–Stere. Another left-wing dissidence broke away with Grigore Iunian in late 1932, establishing itself as a Radical Peasants' Party (PȚR) in 1933.

Schisms and competition were compensated by recruitment, including in the intellectual sphere. Writer Șerban Cioculescu, who entered in early 1928, described the PNȚ as "the only political factor which may democratize Romania". In the early 1930s, new arrivals included philosophers Petre Andrei and Constantin Rădulescu-Motru, linguist Traian Bratu, and painter Rudolf Schweitzer-Cumpăna; also joining were leaders of the Romanian Army, including Nicolae Alevra and Ioan Mihail Racoviță. The PNȚ's left earned endorsements from poet Ion Vinea and his Facla newspaper, as well as from lawyer Haralambie Marchetti, known as a protector of the communists. The PNȚ's more leftist youth published the magazine Stânga, which attracted collaborations from Petru Comarnescu and Traian Herseni. A highly visible left-wing cell was formed at the University of Iași by Bratu and Andrei, gathering new members and sympathizers: Constantin Balmuș, Octav Botez, Iorgu Iordan, Andrei Oțetea, and Mihai Ralea.

Unable to obtain a reduction of the foreign debt, and harangued by an increasingly confident PNL, the Vaida cabinet fell in November 1933. A PNL team under Ion G. Duca took over. The election of December 1933 was a National Liberal sweep, leaving the PNȚ with less than 15% of the votes cast. Duca took on the task of dissolving the Iron Guard, and was murdered by a death squad on December 29; the premiership passed to another PNL man, Gheorghe Tătărescu. The PNȚ viewed Tătărescu's appointment as arbitrary, and protested on the issue. The spread of credible rumors according to which Maniu was slated for assassination by Carol's partisans rekindled the Peasant Guards (now also known as the "Maniu Guards"); they continued to be active throughout most of 1934, until the party leadership asked them to dissolve.

=== Vaida schism and "popular front" ===
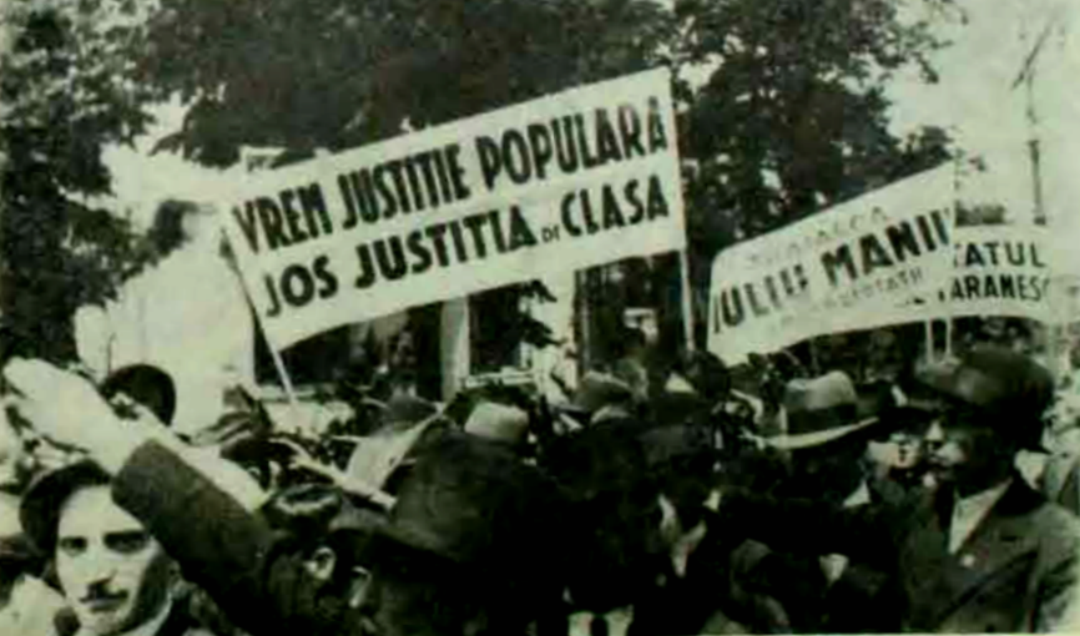
Communists from the various Sectors of Bucharest, attending a PNȚ rally (May 31, 1936). On the left, the communist slogan: Vrem justiție populară / Jos justiția de clasă ("We demand popular justice / down with class justice"); on the right, National Peasantist signs celebrating Maniu and the "Peasant State"

From March 1933, Lupu began attacking his former colleagues by bringing up alleged government corruption, in what became known as the "Škoda Affair". Maniu dismissed this as Carol's attempt to weaken the PNȚ, though the king's maneuvering permanently damaged the reputation of PNȚ-ists such as Romulus Boilă. Won over by Carol's political vision, Vaida lost the party chairmanship in March 1935, and inaugurated a new schism, creating his very own far-right party, the Romanian Front (FR), during the following month. Maniu also lost his grip on the PNȚ, and Mihalache was voted in for his second term. His relationship with Maniu reached a low point, with Mihalache hinting that he could order the PNR leadership expelled if they did not comply to his agenda. Under his watch, the PNȚ adopted a new statute in 1934, and a new program at the second party congress in April 1935. These pledged the party to a careful selection of cadres from the ranks of peasantry and youth, fully committing them to the project of establishing a "peasant state". The architects were figures on the left of the party—Ralea, Andrei, Mihail Ghelmegeanu, and Ernest Ene—, who worked from drafts first presented in Ralea's Viața Românească. During their ascendancy, in March 1934, Lupu and his followers were welcomed back into the PNȚ. This merger saw the party being joined by historian Ioan Hudiță, who later became one of Maniu's dedicated supporters.

From May 1935, the PNȚ held massive rallies, showcasing Mihalache's ambition of forming a new cabinet. Party unity was enforced by the decision of centrist Transylvanians such as Corneliu Coposu to side with democratic traditions and reject Vaida's penchant for far-right authoritarianism. In 1935, Coposu became leader of the national youth wing, called Tineretul Național Țărănesc (TNȚ), proceeding to purge Vaidists from the various party organizations. Maniu's nephew and potential successor, Ionel Pop, also took a stand against antisemitism, expressing horror at any attempt to align Romania with Nazi Germany. Anti-Nazism was likewise voiced by Facla, causing its editorial offices to be stormed by the National-Christian Defense League (LANC).

The Vaidist dissidence resulted in scuffles throughout Transylvania. In one such incident, PNȚ-ist Ilie Lazăr was reportedly shot in the arm. Only some 10% or 15% of PNȚ cadres were attracted by Vaida's group. Overall, however, the National Peasantist failure to address the economic needs of its own constituents resulted in a steady decrease of its voting share—many peasants switched to supporting the Iron Guard or any of the other far-right parties. The explicitly fascist National Christian Party (PNC), founded as a merger of the LANC and Goga's National Agrarians, was especially adept at canvassing the peasant vote in Bessarabia, veering it toward antisemitism. Alongside the FR, it earned Carol's blessing to establish a "nationalist parliamentary bloc", specifically designed to keep the PNȚ out of power.

The danger was sensed by Mihalache, who presided over massive anti-fascist rally in November 1935, amassing a reported 500,000 participants nation-wide. Following an audience with Carol, he claimed that the PNȚ would be called to power. In December 1935, the PNȚ reinforced discipline against left-wing dissent, expelling from its ranks Dem. I. Dobrescu, who went on to create his own movement, the "Citizen Committees". Overall, however, the party became more sympathetic to left-wing causes. At his arrest in 1936, communist liaison Petre Constantinescu-Iași nominated the PNȚ and PȚR as anti-fascist parties; in 1935, he had tried but failed to forge a PCdR alliance with both groups, as well as with the Social Democrats and the Jewish Party. Communist support and endorsement by the Ploughmen's Front were relevant in ensuring victories for PNȚ candidates Lupu and Ghiță Pop in the Assembly by-elections of Mehedinți and Hunedoara (February 1936). While the PNȚ elite took measures to downplay its far-left connection, left-wingers such as Dobrescu openly celebrated it as a winning combination. As summarized by historian Armin Heinen, PNȚ leftists also refrained from calling it a "popular front", and only viewed socialist groups as subordinate.

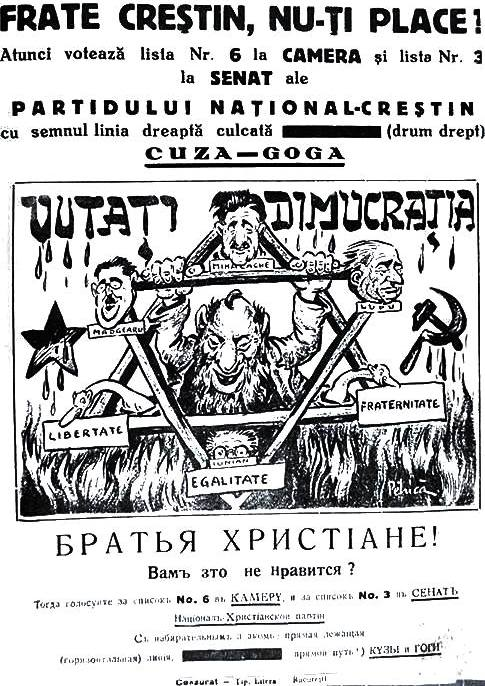
Poster of the National Christian Party, used for the general election of 1937. Image shows a stereotypical Jewish man maneuvering democratic politics, depicted as a Star of David festooned with heads of PNȚ leftists Mihalache, Virgil Madgearu, and Nicolae L. Lupu, alongside Grigore Iunian of the Radical Peasants' Party

The PNȚ, PSDR, PCdR and PȚR created a de facto united front during the county elections of 1936 and early 1937; also signing up where satellite parties: the Ploughmen's Front, the Hungarian People's Union, the Popovici Socialists, the Conservative Party, and Dobrescu's Committees. In Bessarabia, the PCdR made noted efforts of reconciling the PNȚ and PȚR. Wherever the PNC appeared stronger, pacts also involved local PNL chapters. Similar pacts were signed in mid 1936 with the Magyar Party, although the latter withdrew, fearful of association with the communists. Many PNȚ sections also resisted alliances with far-leftist groups, but, even in such cases, the PCdR urged its followers to vote National Peasantist. Mihalache's solution was to impose and vet a single platform for the alliance, which prevented the PCdR from using it as a means to popularize socialism.

At around the same time, Gheorghe Beza, a political conspirator with known links to the Iron Guard, began exposing Codreanu's various secrets, including his erstwhile cultivation by Vaida. From 1936, Beza was a card-carrying PNȚ man, assigned leadership over the Peasant Guards, following their reactivation by Mihalache. The Guards were supervised by a Military Section, comprising Army officials: Admiral Dan Zaharia was a member, alongside generals Ștefan Burileanu, Gheorghe Rujinschi, Gabriel Negrei, and Ioan Sichitiu. Zaharia was directly involved with the Peasant Guards of Muscel County, whom he used to quell violence by the LANC militia, or Lăncieri. Clashes also occurred at Faraoani, where PNC men ambushed a PNȚ column, and at Focșani, where the Peasant Guards were called in to break up an Iron Guard rally. Codreanu's followers were especially incensed by the Guards' creation, and resorted to kidnapping and threatening Madgearu in order to have them called off. At Iași, Bratu narrowly survived a stabbing, for which he blamed the Iron Guard.

=== 1937 crisis ===
The mid 1930s also consolidated a PNȚ "centrist" wing, represented by Armand Călinescu, and supported by Ghelmegeanu. This faction favored a full clampdown on the Iron Guard, but hoped to achieve its defeat in close alliance with Carol. At the third general congress of April 4–5, 1937, which was to be the PNȚ's last, inner-party stability appeared to be threatened by "intrigue and ambition", although shows of unity were made in various rallies. During that interval, prosecutors brought R. Boilă to trial for his participation in the "Škoda Affair". He and all other defendants were acquitted. Coposu, who attempted to show that the case was instrumented by Carol as revenge against his PNȚ opponents, was found guilty of lèse-majesté and spent three months in prison.

Ahead of legislative elections in December 1937, Carol invited Mihalache to form a cabinet, but also tried to impose some of his own selections as ministers; Mihalache refused to comply. As a result of this failure, Maniu returned as chairman of the PNȚ—he would serve as such uninterruptedly, to July 1947. Immediately after taking over, he proceeded to reinforce party discipline, obtaining promises of compliance from left-wingers Lupu and Madgearu. His return also allowed the formation of a right-wing section in Bucharest. Its leader, Ilariu Dobridor, openly argued for Lupu to be expelled from the party.

The PNȚ completely revised its alliances, agreeing to limited cooperation with the Iron Guard and the Georgist Liberals. The three parties agreed to support "free elections" and still competed against each other; however, the pact's very existence shocked the liberal mainstream, especially after revelations that PNȚ cadres could no longer criticize the Guard. Călinescu and Ghelmegeanu's group was alienated, openly describing the pact as morally unsound, and preferring full cooperation with Carol; Mihalache also dissented, but on democratic grounds. The events caught the PCdR underground by surprise: in November, its leader Ștefan Foriș had urged his colleagues to vote PNȚ, even in preference to the PSDR. A "workers' delegation", made up of PSDR and PCdR activists, visited Maniu and insisted that he should revise the "non-aggression pact". The scandal divided Romania's left-wing press: newspapers such as Adevărul remained committed to Maniu, though communist sympathizers such as Zaharia Stancu and Geo Bogza went back on their support for a PNȚ-led popular front, and switched to endorsing the PȚR. By contrast, Dobrescu and his Committees deserted Iunian on December 1, and were folded back into the PNȚ.

The election marked a historic impasse, whereby the PNL failed to clearly win elections organized under its watch. It dropped to 152 parliamentary seats, with the PNȚ holding on to 86 (and 20% of the vote); this was just 20 seats ahead of the Guard, which had emerged as Romania's third party. Carol opted to use his royal prerogative and bypassed all groups opposing his policies, handing power to a PNC minority cabinet, under Goga. Goga's arrival signaled Romania's rapprochement toward Germany, which had emerged as a key regional player following the Munich Agreement. Concerns about German re-armament also pushed Maniu into "demand[ing] an alignment with Berlin". However, he punished attempts by other PNȚ figures to collaborate with Goga, and expelled Călinescu, who had accepted a ministerial position. This move lost the PNȚ its party organization in Argeș County, which obeyed Călinescu.

Maniu had a return as the opposition leader, speaking out against Carol and Goga, and promising a "national revolt" against their regime—while making note of his intention to form an "opposition bloc" alongside the Iron Guard. During the early days of 1938, the PNȚ was negotiating with the PNL to also join this alliance. The project was vetoed by Tătărescu, whose "Young Liberals" supported Carol's policies, and by Mihalache, who resented the Maniu–Codreanu rapprochement. Though Mihalache rallied with the party line in calling out the PNC ministers as "scoundrels", he secretly collaborated with Călinescu against Maniu. The latter viewed himself and his fellow defectors as a "pro-government" splinter of the PNȚ, and counted on Mihalache's contextual support.

=== FRN and National Legionary regimes ===
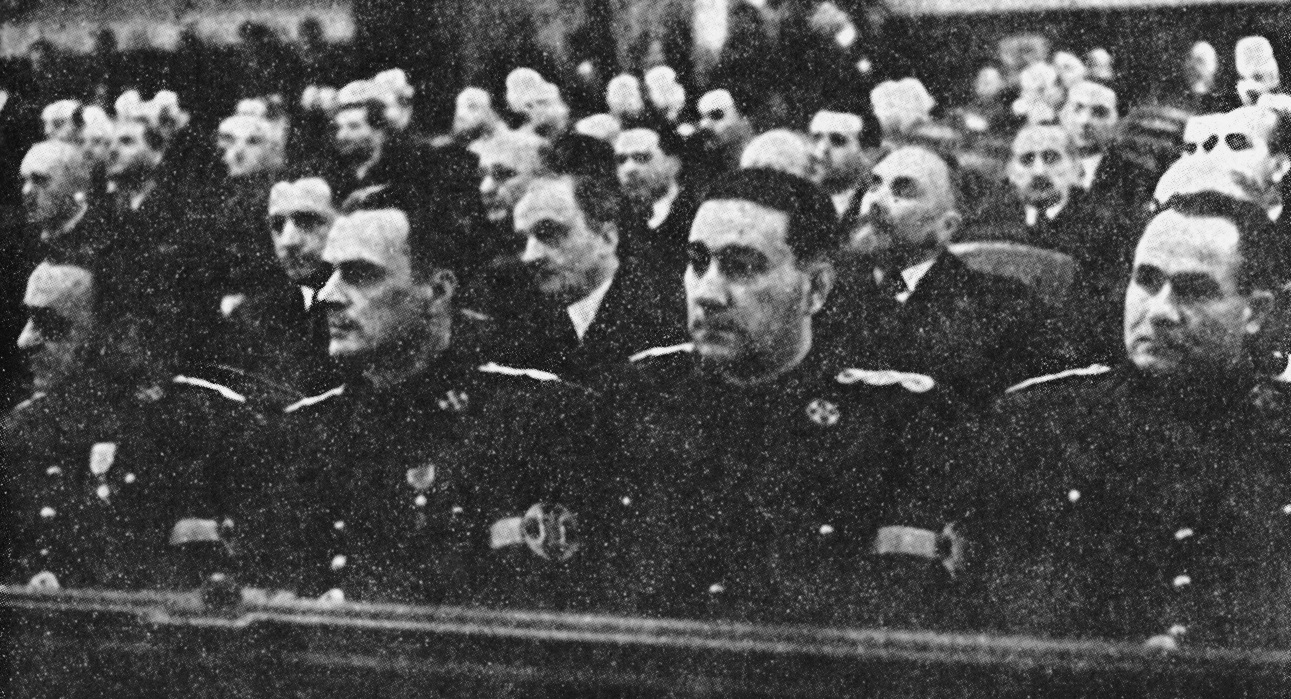
Former PNȚ politicians, in uniform, attending the founding session of the National Renaissance Front; from the left: Armand Călinescu, Grigore Gafencu, Mihai Ralea. To their right is Mitiță Constantinescu, formerly of the PNL

An international backlash against Goga's staunch antisemitism had also made Carol reconsider his choices. Initially, he favored creating a new majority coalition with the Iron Guard and the PNȚ (though demanding that Maniu be kept out of any such formula). Goga was deposed on February 10, 1938, when all political groups prepared for repeat elections. The Peasant Guards had been revived in January, taking the name of "Maniu Guards", and were divided into two main commands: Lazăr took over in Transylvania, and General Rujinschi in the Old Kingdom. The project also involved Victor Jinga, tasked by Maniu with supervising the Guards' expansion into the provinces. Beza had left the project and, in January 1938, was attempting to form his own "Workers and Peasants' Party".

At the height of the electoral campaign, the PNȚ and the PNL sought to obtain a new understanding with Carol, fearing that the PNC and the Iron Guard would form a powerful fascist alliance, and then a totalitarian state. Under pressure from the PNȚ base, Maniu revoked the pact with the Iron Guard, leaving that group entirely isolated on the political scene. He had instead initiated talks with the PȚR. This produced a "common constitutional front" before January 18, with negotiations continuing for the PNL's adherence to it. The PNȚ again sought grassroots communist support: in Vâlcea County, it shared a list with the "Democratic Union", assigning eligible positions to a PCdR militant Mihail Roșianu and a communist-sympathizing priest, Ioan Marina.

Carol rejected Maniu's proposals, and used the opportunity for an anti-democratic self-coup. Despite vocal protests by Maniu and the PNL's Dinu Brătianu, he inaugurated a royal dictatorship, leading to the creation of a catch-all National Renaissance Front (FRN). The PNȚ attempted to sabotage the authoritarian Constitution, instructing members to cast a negative vote in the February 24 plebiscite. The attempt was unsuccessful, and the party continued to lose ground over the following months. On March 30, it was outlawed together with all other traditional parties.

The new government integrated much of the PNȚ's center, with Călinescu at Interior Affairs; Andrei, Ghelmegeanu, and Ralea, alongside Grigore Gafencu and Traian Ionașcu, became prominent FRN dignitaries, as did Moldovan. Gusti and Rădulescu-Motru were also co-opted into joining the exodus during late 1938. More junior PNȚ-ists such as Adrian Brudariu abandoned the National Peasantist cause, allegedly joining the FRN for material benefits. Maniu and Popovici could still count on their core Transylvanian constituency, which helped them circulate a December 1938 memorandum calling on Carol to restore civil liberties. Coposu was arrested and detained for distributing copies of that document.

Călinescu tacitly allowed the PNȚ and PNL to preserve parts of their infrastructures, including some local offices. In early 1939, the regime proposed allowing the PNȚ a share of parliamentary mandates, to which Mihalache responded: "Mr Carol would do best to leave us alone." During the sham election of June 1939, the FRN administration took care to prevent interference by "intermediary groups" such as the PNȚ, PNL, PNC and Iron Guard. In May, the PNȚ, PNL and PCdR engaged in talks to form an "opposition parliament" and "united front"; authorities subsequently reported that protest votes had been cast for PNȚ leaders, whereas candidacies of PNȚ defectors such as Alexandru Mîță had been publicly booed. Maniu, Mihalache, Lupu and Iunian still qualified as lifetime Senators, but refused to wear the FRN uniform, and were expelled.

By then, Călinescu had masterminded a nation-wide clampdown against the Iron Guard, including Codreanu's physical liquidation. This resulted in a series of retaliatory attacks, peaking in September 1939, when a Guardist death squad managed to assassinate Călinescu. During November, Carol made one final attempt to establish a "national alliance" around the FRN, inviting Maniu to join in; the offer was dismissed. Mihalache held a seat in the Crown Council in early 1940, possibly because doing so toned down pressures on his friend Madgearu, whom Carol had placed under arrest. A political crisis began in Romania during June 1940, when the FRN government gave in to a Soviet ultimatum and withdrew its administration from Bessarabia. Maniu referred to this as a Soviet invasion, and believed that the Army should have resisted. In August 1940, after reassurances from both Nazi Germany and the Soviet Union, Regency Hungary asked Romania to negotiate territorial cessions in Transylvania. Maniu issued a public protest, demanding no reduction of territorial integrity.

The same month, Carol's regime yielded to Nazi pressures and Romania signed the Second Vienna Award, which divided the region roughly in half, with Northern Transylvania assigned to Hungary. This sparked major unrest, with "huge protest rallies" asking for Maniu to establish a cabinet of "national resistance", which Maniu refused to do. One such proposal came from the PCdR and the Soviet Union, and promised Romania military assistance from the Red Army; Maniu was outraged by the proposal, arguing that the Soviet Union was "imperialistic by definition". Carol assigned the task of forming a cabinet to General Ion Antonescu, who obtained backing from both the PNȚ and the PNL. Both groups insisted that Antonescu could take over only after Carol agreed to abdicate. This put an end to Carol's rule, bringing the country under an Iron Guard regime—the National Legionary State, with Antonescu as Conducător; though still neutral to 1941, Romania was now openly aligned with the Axis powers. Widely seen as a German arrangement, the Legionary State was in fact a result of Maniu's refusal to follow Antonescu's ideological command; the Nazis had repeatedly called for a multiparty alliance.

=== Resisting Antonescu ===
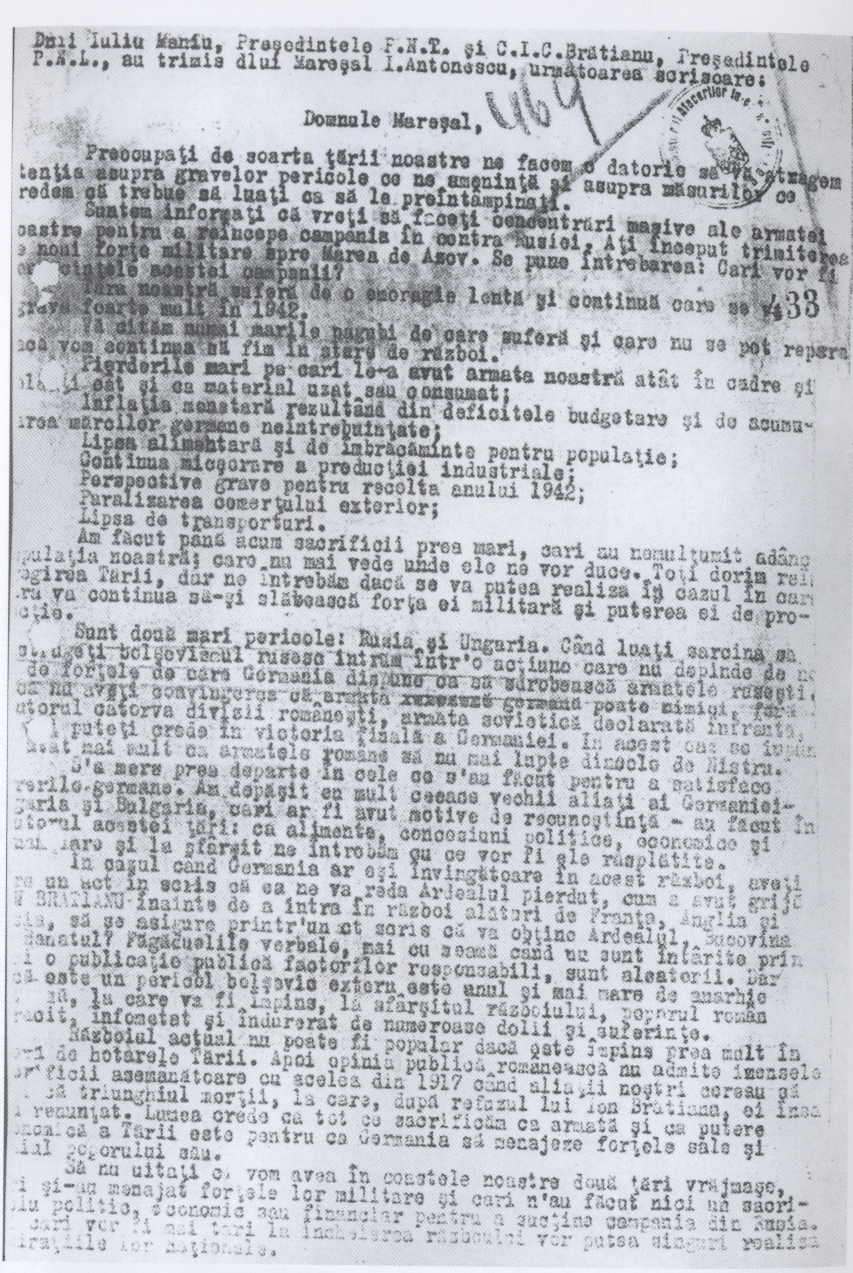
Protest letter sent to Ion Antonescu by Maniu and Dinu Brătianu, January 1942

The PNȚ continued to exist semi-clandestinely, obtaining repeated assurances from Antonescu that the various territorial chapters would not be harassed by the Iron Guard, and complaining whenever he failed to keep them. According to Siguranța reports, it was always more active than the PNL. Its quarters were informally acknowledged as being Ciulei House, an apartment complex located at Sfinților Street 10, Bucharest. From late 1940, Maniu channeled anti-Nazi discontent by forming an association called Pro Transilvania and a newspaper, Ardealul, both of which reminded Romanians that Antonescu was not interested in a reversal of the Vienna Award. The Guardist takeover also pushed some National Peasantists into exile: facing a death sentence at home, Beza made his way to Cairo, where he formed a Free Romania Movement under British supervision. Viorel Tilea and Ion Rațiu opted not to return from England, serving as liaisons between the PNȚ and the British war ministry.

Towards the end of 1940, Antonescu became dissatisfied with the Guard partnership. The Guard organized the Jilava Massacre and various other murders of old-regime politicians, including Madgearu. This caused alarm for other figures of the PNȚ, in particular Mihalache and Lupu; Ghiță Pop took Madgearu's position at the party secretariat. In the aftermath, Maniu pleaded with the Conducător that he should reinstate order and individual security. After a brief civil war in January 1941, the Guard was removed from power and again repressed. German reports identified PNȚ-ist generals as most active in destroying the National Legionary regime; armed PNȚ civilians, including Lupu, assisted the Army at various locations in Bucharest.

Following the events, Antonescu had renewed hopes that he could co-opt the PNȚ and then PNL on his cabinet. Both parties refused the offer. During February, Maniu openly criticized Antonescu for abandoning Northern Transylvania and for previously condoning Guardist abuse. He also argued that a legalized PNȚ would have been a more efficient and legitimate actor in purging the Guard. In April, he attempted to organize a rally against the invasion of Yugoslavia, but called it off when Antonescu warned him that demonstrators would be fired upon. Later that year, Maniu and Coposu engaged in encrypted correspondence with the Western Allies, preparing for an anti-Nazi takeover in Romania; they aligned themselves closely with Britain, seeking to obtain direct advice from Winston Churchill.

The PNȚ and the PNL welcomed Romania's participation in the Nazi attack on the Soviet Union, since it returned Bessarabian lands to Romania. However, both parties protested when Antonescu gave the order to advance beyond interwar borders and annex Transnistria. This period also signaled Romania's participation in the Holocaust, heralded by the Iași pogrom. These crimes were also vocally condemned by the PNȚ and the PNL in letters to Antonescu. Maniu still refused to believe that Antonescu had a genocidal agenda and, when interviewed by American diplomats, played down the pogrom's importance. By 1942, having been informed that Britain and the US intended to assess and punish all antisemitic crimes, he told Romanian ministers that the deportation of Bessarabian Jews risked destroying Romania; Mihalache also added his input, describing deportations as "alien to the humanitarian traditions of our people." Antonescu largely tolerated such insubordination, but also curbed it at regular intervals. In August 1942, he threatened to "castigate in due course" Maniu and others who opposed "cleansing this nation totally of the [Jewish] blight."

In November 1941, Maniu also publicized his complete opposition to war in the East, prompting Antonescu to order a clampdown against Anglophile resistance centers. Communist sources noted a discrepancy in repression statistics: while the elites were allowed to carry out a "paper war" with the regime, regular PNȚ militants risked imprisonment for expressing anti-fascist beliefs. From 1942, the camp in Târgu Jiu accommodated various PNȚ-ists, including Nicolae Carandino, who had published an article critical of Antonescu, and Anton Alexandrescu, who, as leader of the TNȚ, had been approached by the PCdR. Detainees also included a selection of militants from all party factions: Lazăr, Zaharia Boilă, Radu Cioculescu, Victor Eftimiu, Augustin Popa, and Emanoil Socor. Released before May 1943, these men became vocal supporters of an understanding between Romania and the Soviets. Boilă, Coposu, Ghiță Pop and Virgil Solomon were also rounded up and threatened for having maintained contacts with the Iron Guard on behalf of Maniu. In 1944, government agents caught Augustin Vișa and Rică Georgescu, who had handled radio communications between Maniu and the Allies. Both were imprisoned, with Vișa being put on trial for high treason. The Conducător dismissed Nazi suggestions that he should have Maniu killed, noting that doing so would only push Romania's peasantry into anti-fascist rebellion. By 1944, he was tolerating the transit through Romania of Northern Transylvanian Jews fleeing extermination in Hungary, some of whom were assisted on their journey by a PNȚ-ist network.

By early 1942, Maniu and Brătianu had come to favor an anti-Nazi coup, and had asked for direct British support. The Soviets were informed of this, but fully rejected Maniu's demands for a restoration of Greater Romania. In January 1943, with over 100,000 Romanian soldiers trapped at Stalingrad, PCdR members approached Maniu with concrete offers for collaboration. Hoping to obtain full peace without a Soviet occupation, Maniu still counted on direct contacts with the West, sending Constantin Vișoianu to negotiate with them in Cairo. These "feelers" were again tolerated by Antonescu. However, a "stumbling-block in all subsequent negotiations" was the demand for Romania's unconditional surrender, which Maniu found unpalatable. The PNȚ advised against toppling Antonescu in February 1944, as had been proposed by the pro-Allied King Michael I—Maniu feared that doing so would leave Romania exposed to Nazi retribution.

"Operation Autonomous", a British attempt to mediate between Maniu and the Soviets, ended abruptly when Alfred Gardyne de Chastelain and Ivor Porter were captured in Romania. In the aftermath, Antonescu again protected Maniu, reassuring the Axis that the Romanian opposition had no real contact with the Allies. During March 1944, Voice of America implied that, if PNȚ leaders still refused to take up armed opposition to the regime, they could expect to be bypassed or deposed. In April, Maniu was finally ready to accept Soviet promises that Romania would be allowed to fight the Germans as an equal partner, and that its territory would not be occupied militarily. The same month, Antonescu was sent a peace protest signed by 69 academics, which was "overtly pro-Soviet in sentiment". At least in part, this was a grassroots PNȚ initiative.

=== 1944 revival ===
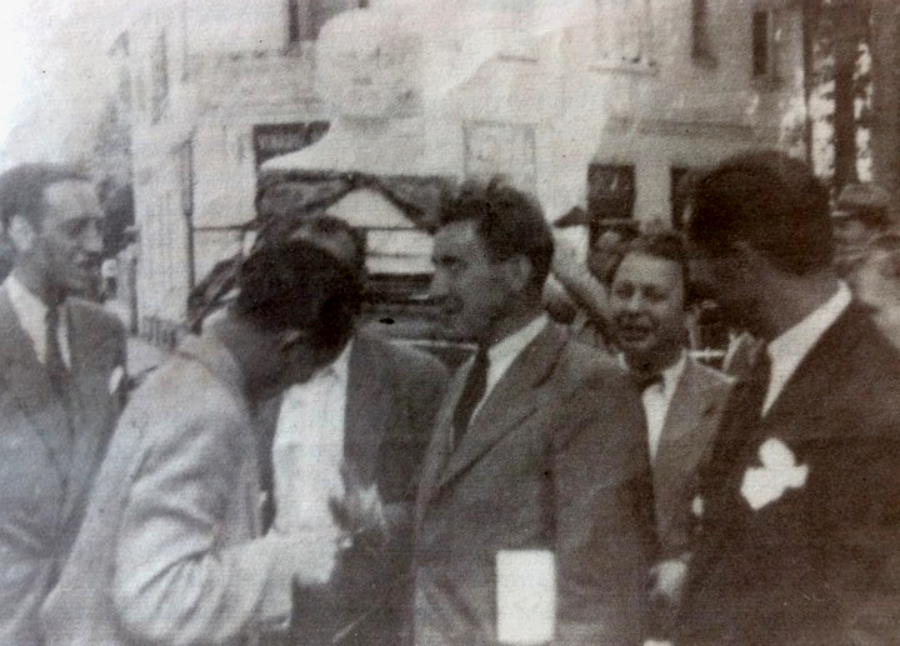
Gabriel Țepelea (middle) greeting foreign journalists outside Ardealul newspaper headquarters, September 1944; also pictured is a newly unveiled bust of Maniu

In June 1944, the PNȚ and PNL agreed to form a Bloc of Democratic Parties (BPD) alongside the PCdR and Social Democrats, preparing for the "King Michael Coup" of August 23. By then, Coposu and Cezar Spineanu were stockpiling firearms in PNȚ buildings, preparing for a BPD confrontation with the authorities. The Bloc existed largely because Maniu believed he could obtain Soviet lenience toward Romania following an armistice, and "only stood to enhance [the communists'] position". The plot involved statistician Sabin Manuilă, who acted as a PNȚ representative; a disciple of Moldovan, he had been involved with Antonescu's project to persecute Jews and deport Romanies, but also protected some 5,000 Jewish specialists working under his watch. Shortly before the coup, Maniu clashed with PCdR envoy Lucrețiu Pătrășcanu, who had wanted the BPD to be joined by Ralea and other FRN eminences. Though largely unaware about any conspiracy, the PNȚ's lower echelons organized a pro-Allied rally at Bellu cemetery on August 20. Meeting with its leaders, Maniu expressed the hope that Antonescu himself would take Romania out of the Axis. Some 2,000 people were allegedly involved in this demonstration, but not all members would commit to a publicized protest: those from the Old Kingdom feared that they would lose their jobs, while Transylvanians pushed for radicalization.

The coup achieved its immediate goals. Dreptatea, which had been banned in 1938, reentered print on August 27, 1944. Openly active from September, the PNȚ moved office to Clemenceau Street 6, which would remain its headquarters until dissolution. Maniu was initially offered the premiership, but opted out, arguing that the position should go to a military man for the war's duration. Historian Vlad Georgescu singles this out as Maniu's "real mistake": "[It] deprived the country of the only leadership that could have been strong and popular, the only party that could have rallied the people around a truly democratic program. In refusing to take over in 1944, Maniu [...] caused a power vacuum into which the Communist Party moved." A military-civilian cabinet was formed by General Constantin Sănătescu. Since the National Peasantists and PCdR envoys could not agree on a list of ministers, these were recruited from Michael I's courtiers, with party men serving only as ministers without portfolio; Leucuția and Solomon were the PNȚ's representatives. The promotion of such comparatively minor figures was criticized by the party's youth, leaving Maniu to acknowledge the brain drain which had affected National Peasantism ever since Călinescu and Ralea's defections.

As described by scholar Lucian Boia, from 1945 the PNȚ emerged from the coup "believing itself the country's great party", which made it adopt a policy of "political and moral intransigence". By 1947, it had 2.12 million card-carrying members; as noted by Georgescu, it ranked ahead of all other parties, albeit "neither numbers nor popularity could bring it to power." Maniu preserved regional influence in reconquered Northern Transylvania, organized from September 1944 under a Committee of the Liberated Regions. This was presided upon by Ionel Pop. Commissariat rule often veered into an antimagyarism that was only ever curbed by the Red Army after a "six-week killing spree". Various reports, including oral testimonies by Peasant Guard members and volunteers who answered calls printed in Ardealul, suggest that local Hungarians were victims of numerous lynchings, either tolerated of encouraged by the Commissariat.

By then, the PCdR had sparked a government crisis over Maniu's rejection of its communization programs; in the aftermath, communists spuriously claimed that Maniu had personally masterminded the killing of Transylvanian Hungarians. Upon taking over at Internal Affairs, PNȚ-ist Nicolae Penescu found himself accused of stalling democratization, and was pushed into resigning. After Maniu was again offered the premiership, and again declined, power went to General Nicolae Rădescu. Maniu and his followers agreed with the PCdR on the need for "de-fascization" in Romania, overseeing a purge of Romania's police agencies and appointing Ghiță Pop as PNȚ representative on the Special Committee for the investigation of war crimes. However, as noted by Boia, "curious solidarities" continued to be formed locally by anti-Carol PNȚ-ists and their Guardist counterparts. Noted Guardists who were accepted as PNȚ members include Horațiu Comaniciu and Silviu Crăciunaș. National Peasantists in Transylvania no longer screened against the Iron Guard, whose affiliates joined into the effort to terrorize Hungarians into leaving the area. Any such recruitment drive was curbed by the PCdR, which obtained assurances from leading Guardists that they would prevent their followers from entering the PNȚ.

The PNȚ's vice presidents in the coup's aftermath were Mihalache, Lupu, and Mihai Popovici. Ghiță Pop was a fourth member of this team, but has to resign upon taking up a position in Sănătescu's cabinet. Maniu was additionally assisted by a Permanent Delegation, whose members included Halippa, Hudiță, Lazăr, Teofil Sauciuc-Săveanu, Gheorghe Zane, as well as, with the introduction of women's suffrage, Ella Negruzzi. Overall, the party was seeing a rejuvenation of its leadership, with Coposu and Virgil Veniamin taking over as junior party secretaries. Noted militants included young academics—among them Radu and Șerban Cioculescu, as well as Vladimir Streinu. The party lost its control over the TNȚ, with Alexandrescu favoring a PCdR alliance. Consequently, Maniu ordered Coposu to establish a loyalist youth group, called Organizația M.

On February 3, 1945, the youth wing broke away from the PNȚ as the Alexandrescu Peasantists. It rallied with a communist-run National Democratic Front (FND), established in October 1944, being identified in PNȚ propaganda as "lackeys of the Communist Party". While Alexandrescu's group remained exceedingly small, the PCdR also revived the Ploughmen's Front. This move was specifically intended to destabilize the PNȚ by recruiting smallholders. In November 1944, it absorbed the Socialist Peasants' Party, a small group established by Ralea and Ghelmegeanu. In order to counteract such moves, Maniu also established a PNȚ Workers' Organization, with Lazăr as its overseer. This body was successful in countering FND propaganda. As part of this conflict, the Printers' Syndicate, which was under communist control, imposed censorship on the opposition press: in February 1945, the PNȚ could only print nine newspapers, whereas the PCdR had thirty-one.

=== Against Groza ===
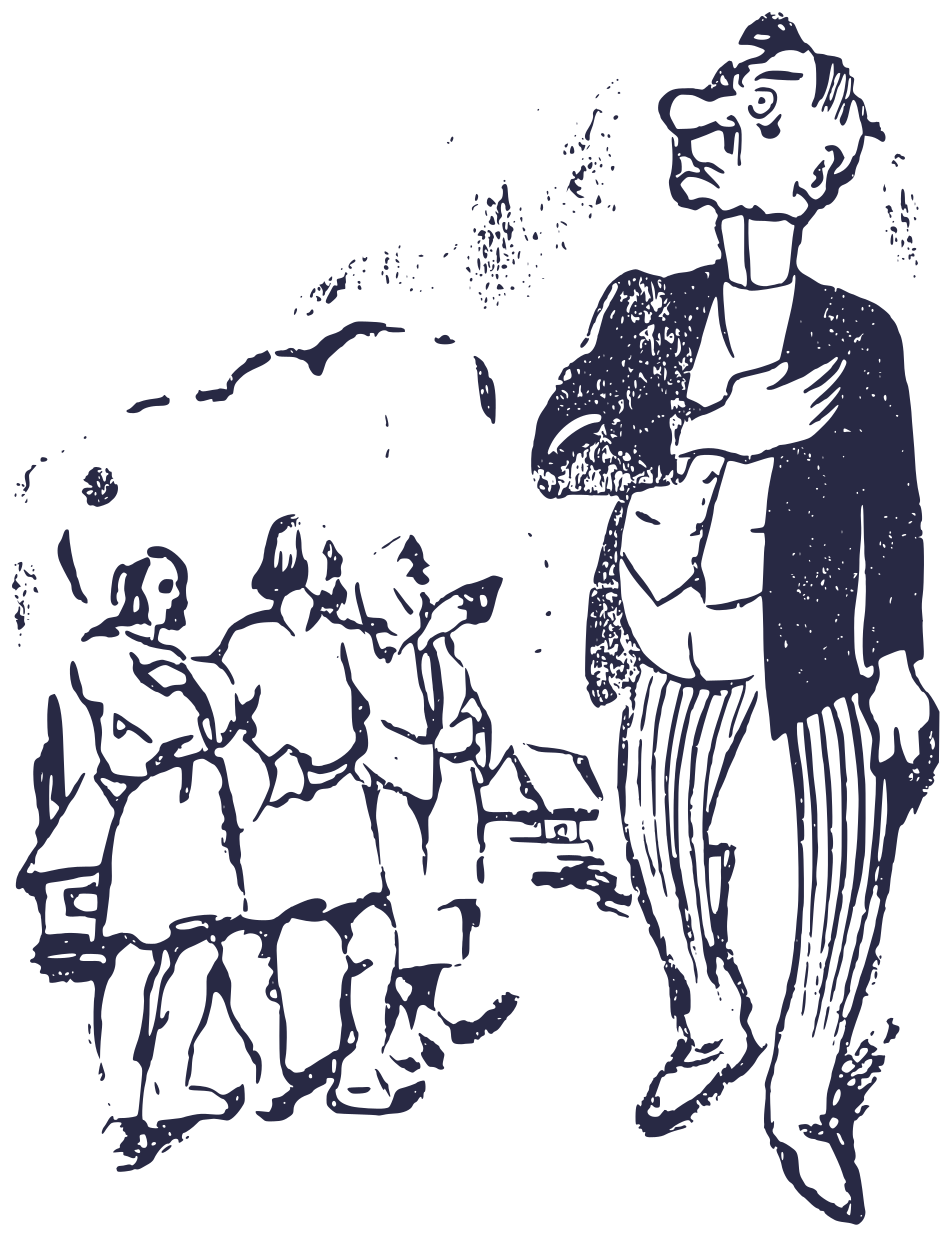
Romanian Communist Party leaflet, published ahead of the November 1946 election: Maniu as an effete gentleman, who has lost contact with the peasants

Rădescu was toppled following a massacre of communist-and-allied protesters, later revealed as a false flag operation carried out by PCdR militias. In early March 1945, the FND took over in government, with Petru Groza, of the Ploughmen's Front, as Prime Minister. The PNȚ remained in the opposition, viewing the takeover as a coup. Although it sent representatives when Groza celebrated the full recovery and pacification of Northern Transylvania, these were purposefully selected from among the party youth. Groza engineered a takeover of all local administration, only failing to do so in six counties. These were progressively made to submit by selective arrests among the opposition activists and by the institution of political censorship, resulting in the closure of other PNȚ newspapers. Emil Hațieganu reported that 40 party newspapers had been shut down since 1944; Dreptatea itself was banned in March, and could only briefly reemerge in January 1946. A standoff between the King and Groza was saluted by the National Peasantists, who participated in a massive monarchist rally in November 1945. Many, including Coposu, were arrested during the clampdown.

During May 1945, while organizing Antonescu's trial by a Romanian People's Tribunal (with which it hoped to discredit Maniu as a Nazi collaborator), the government also ordered massive arrests among its cadres. A large number of PNȚ regional activists, as well as PNȚ youth who had participated in the November rally, were detained at camps in Caracal and Slobozia, but ultimately released in December 1945. While Maniu dissociated himself from the movement, Groza was supported by the communists' "popular assemblies", which openly called for the PNȚ and PNL to be outlawed and repressed. Churchill's electoral defeat in July was read as an additional bad omen by Maniu, who noted that Labour had no sympathy for Romanian anti-communists. He asked Rațiu not to return from England, but continue to serve as his lobbyist.

Other PNȚ men and women were by then involved in the establishment of an armed anti-communist resistance. Founded by three Ardealul volunteers in 1944, the group Haiducii lui Avram Iancu asked Maniu for assistance. It received no such endorsement, although communist prosecutors would claim that it and all other such units were financed by the party leadership. General Aurel Aldea, who spoke for Haiducii, had credentials as an adversary of the Iron Guard, but also viewed the PNȚ as inefficient and unpatriotic. In early 1945, some PNȚ members had affiliated with the National Resistance Movement, operated by a dissident Iron Guard member, George Manu. Its democratic and fascist wings remained generally hostile to one another. Maniu was still "reluctant to collaborate" with various resistance groups, "since many manifested anti-Semitic and ultra-nationalist sentiments." From April 1946, PNȚ men networked in Suceava County between the Sumanele Negre partisans and an American envoy, Ira Hamilton. This and various other resistance units took in members of the Peasant Guards. In June, the US Central Intelligence Group worked with the PNȚ to set up a sleeper network, tasked with opening up a second front in case of a Soviet attack on Turkey. The local organization was infiltrated by the Soviets and soon after repressed. Dreptatea still published regular praise of the Soviet Union, but did so on the advice of American envoys, and hoping to ensure the party's survival under occupation.

During May 1946, Groza established a new BPD from FND affiliates and other parties, including Alexandrescu's. Later that year, the Border Police of Iași County reported that the local PNȚ branch was experiencing mass desertions, with Iorgu Iordan and Andrei Oțetea reemerging as communists. Maniu's grip on the party was also loosened from January 1946, when Lupu led another schism. His eponymous Democratic Peasants' Party–Lupu (PȚD-L) condemned Maniu as an enemy of the people, but did not support Groza. As the PSDR split into anti- and pro-BPD parties, Lupu ensured contacts between the former group and the mainline PNȚ. Maniu was also able to preserve his "fiefdom" of Sălaj, which saw members of the Ploughmen's Front quitting to join the PNȚ.

Groza yielded to Western demands and included two members of the interwar democratic parties into his cabinet; the PNȚ-reserved seat went to Hațieganu. This moment marked his party's final presence in government, with the PNȚ and the BPD facing each other as adversaries in a "decisive battle" for the general elections in November 1946. In preparation, the government proceeded to modify the electoral list, stripping as many as 80% of PNȚ members of their voting rights; in Bucharest, only 10% of party affiliates were eligible to vote. Groza also drafted legislation that suppressed the Senate, which had traditionally been the more conservative chamber. Maniu attempted to persuade King Michael not to sign it, hoping that the resulting crisis would prompt an Anglo–American intervention. The monarch disagreed, fearing that the attempt would have uncontrollable effects.

On October 21, the PNȚ, PNL, and Constantin Titel Petrescu's Independent Social Democrats signed an "agreement for the defense of democratic freedoms". However, the PNȚ was opposed to creating a single electoral alliance, confident that it could win on its own. By then, National Peasantist electoral agents had found themselves targeted by violence, with especially brutal incidents in Arad and Pitești; four local activists were murdered, while Penescu was heavily injured. At Balinț, the arrival of pro-BPD hecklers to a PNȚ meeting resulted in an altercation, during which a communist was killed. The party was nearly prevented from even entering the race in Năsăud County. Here, its attempt to form a paramilitary resistance led to a clampdown. During the backlash, Lazăr was arrested and neutralized as a threat, with Veniamin replacing him at the Workers' Organization.

=== 1947 clampdown ===
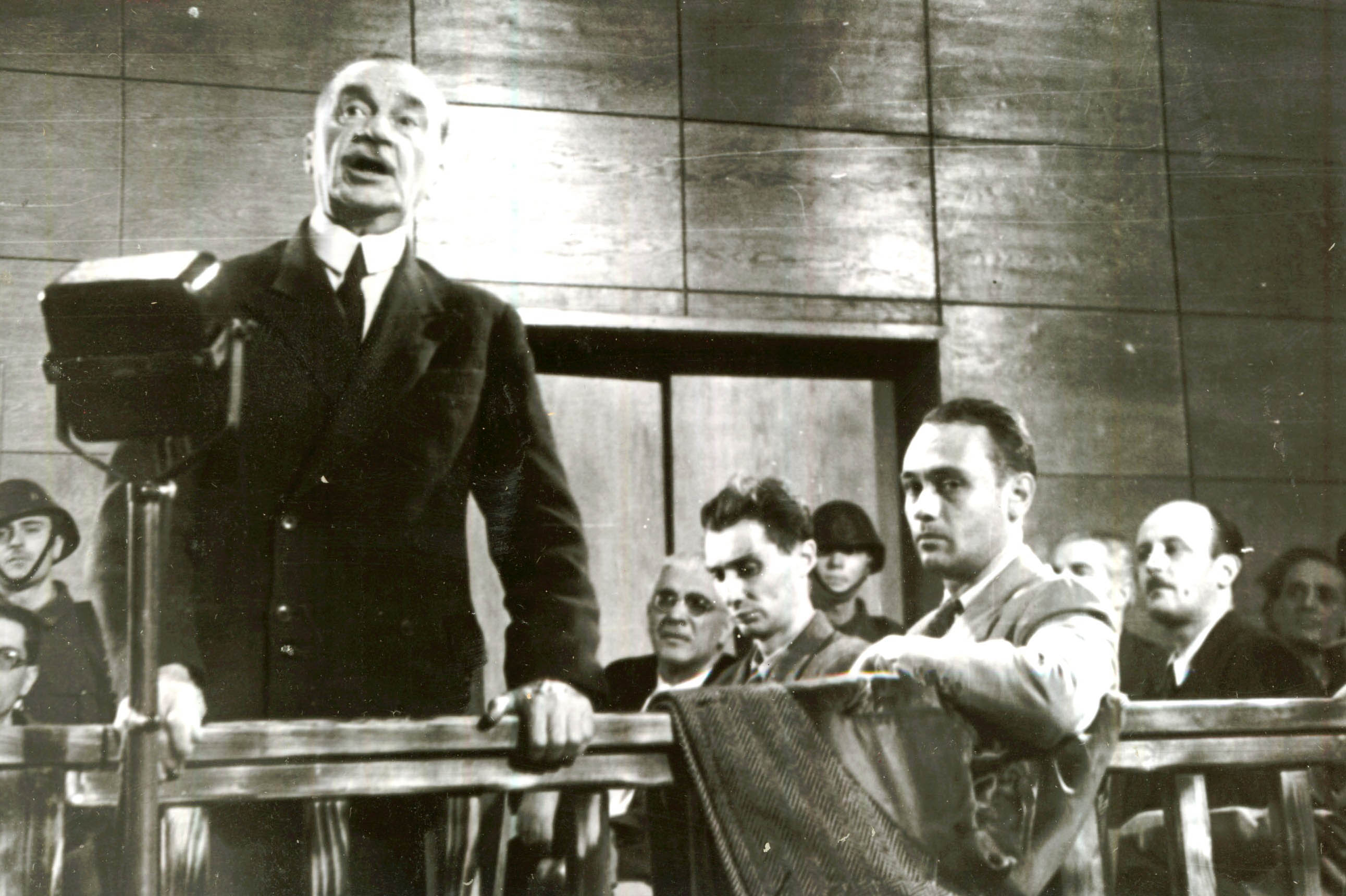
Maniu interrogated at his show trial in November 1947

According to official records, the election was a landslide communist win. In-depth reporting suggests that the scrutiny was falsified by Groza's administration, with the PNȚ taking most votes. PCdR internal documents have the PNȚ and PNL together at 52%, with over 70% reached in Dorohoi, Maramureș, Muscel, Olt, and Rădăuți. The PNȚ claimed 70% of the vote nationally, with the PNL at 10%. Maniu concluded that his party had been invested with full confidence by the Romanian public, and therefore that it should form government. When the official results were published, the PNȚ Central Executive Committee demanded a new vote; its effort to raise awareness was nullified by King Michael, who ratified all parliamentary mandates. The unicameral legislature assigned 377 mandates to Groza's BPD, while the opposition had 37, of which 32 were held by the PNȚ and 2 by the PȚD-L. Among those elected was Mara Lazăr, wife of Ilie, who reportedly won by 93% in her husband's constituency.

Maniu ordered PNȚ deputies not to attend Assembly sessions. During this parliamentary strike, the BPD started its "brutal offensive" and "final assault" against the National Peasantists. In early 1947, Pantelimon Chirilă, who had reorganized the PNȚ branch in Rădăuți County, had to retire from politics after being beaten up. Local activists were by then being re-arrested, though the authorities agreed to spare PNȚ deputies (by then numbering 33 people) and some in the central structures, including Mihalache and Penescu. These events prompted Maniu to publicly ask for American troops to be sent to Romania on a peacekeeping mission. In that context, the regime confiscated leaflets, allegedly sent out by the Peasant Guards, which called for a popular uprising and for "death to the communists", while referring to Antonescu as "an archangel and a martyr". According to police reports, the PNȚ worked with YMCA and the Friends of America Association to build a solid base in Severin County, but was divided over the possibility of recruiting among the Iron Guard's clandestine networks.

Groza's government then staged the "Tămădău Affair", which centered on Mihalache's attempt to leave the country clandestinely on July 14, 1947. The party headquarters was searched by police agents, and Maniu was arrested on July 19, accused of having colluded alongside Mihalache, Grigore Gafencu, and a number of foreign agents. The controversy offered a pretext for outlawing the PNȚ by a parliament act on July 29. Both the PNL and the PȚD-L endorsed this measure, resulting in a 294-to-1 majority. A show trial took place, and sentences were passed against PNȚ cadres, from seniors Maniu and Mihalache (both of whom would die in prison) to the more junior Carandino. Coposu was also arrested, and held without trial until 1956, when he was sentenced for high treason.

The party continued to exist clandestinely, though its structures are hard to reconstruct. A party representation was set up at Reșița by engineer Alexandru Popp, who proposed detonating the Assembly hall as BPD deputies were being sworn in. The Iron Guard's Ion Gavrilă Ogoranu, who took part in the anti-communist resistance, identifies Popp as Maniu's successor, and notes that the PNȚ was thus represented on the movement's "unified command". Also according to Ogoranu, this group already maintained links with the Romanian National Committee (RNC), formed in exile by General Rădescu. The project of merging the Iron Guard and the PNȚ into one major diaspora party was embraced and advocated by Comăniciu and Crăciunaș, who organized an anti-communist base in Austria. Crăciunaș also helped a number of PNȚ leaders to defect abroad—examples include Manuilă, Veniamin, and Romulus Boilă.

From 1947, PNȚ exiles joined Stanisław Mikołajczyk's International Peasants' Union, which, from early 1948, had Grigore Niculescu-Buzești on its Central Committee. Their party's affiliation to the RNC was only formalized in April 1949, when Niculescu-Buzești, Cornel Bianu, and Augustin Popa were included on its leadership board; Vișoianu and Gafencu also joined, but as independents. Unlike Rădescu, Vișoianu and Niculescu-Buzești remained opposed to any alliance with the Iron Guard. Vișoianu would serve as RNC chairman to 1975, when the Committee had dissolved; by then, Manuilă had also been inducted into the RNC.

With the inauguration of Communist Romania in early 1948, and before the formal introduction of a single-party state, the PȚD-L was still allowed to organize, with Nicolae Gh. Lupu as its new president. It ran in the sham election of March 1948, which also saw reports of "reactionary propaganda" in favor of the outlawed PNȚ. Persecution of National Peasantists came in successive waves. In its early months, the regime captured armed PNȚ cells led by Silvestru Fociuc of Iași and Ion Uță of Teregova. In late 1949, a lot comprising A. Popa and Gabriel Țepelea was tried and jailed for "subverting the social order"; Beza was also caught in 1951. Publicly tried by the Soviets, Halippa was moved between the Gulag and Romanian prisons, surviving both. In the Apuseni Mountains, a resistance cell of PNȚ and Guardists was organized by Ioan Bogdan, until being finally put down by the Securitate in 1952. This rapprochement had a utilitarian purpose for the Iron Guard: while in confinement, Ghiță Pop and Ioan Bărbuș assisted Guardist prisoners by transferring them food and medicine, without realizing that the Guardist cells were actually informing the regime on their activities.

The PNȚ had a sizable representation in both armed resistance and the prison population. According to official estimates, at least half of the anti-communist partisans had never had a political affiliation; of the remainder, a plurality were PNȚ-ists. From August 1952, all those who had served as city or county leaders in four traditional parties, including the PNȚ and PNL, were automatically deported to penal colonies; some, like Șerban Cioculescu, were tacitly excepted, while an explicit pardon was granted to all of Alexandrescu's followers. One count suggests that, overall, 272,000 PNȚ members spent time in communist prisons. A parallel phenomenon saw former National Peasantists joining the Communist Party—which had absorbed the PSDR and was known at the time as the "Workers' Party" (PMR). This movement began in July 1947: while regional party leaders went into hiding, large sections of the base enlisted with the BPD parties. The PMR's own estimates suggest that, even after an early wave of expulsions in 1950, its cadres still comprised 5.6% undesirables, including former PNȚ-ists.

=== Final resurgence ===
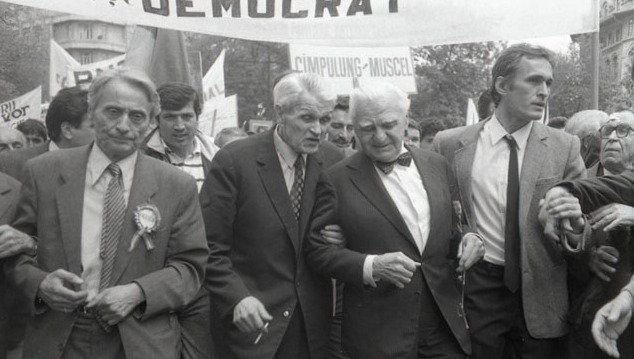
Front row, from the left: Ion Diaconescu, Corneliu Coposu, and Ion Rațiu attending a rally of the Christian Democratic National Peasants' Party in 1990

From 1954, with the advent of national communism and Romania's interest in joining the United Nations, violent repression was toned down by unprecedented clemency. As noted at the time by Premier Gheorghe Gheorghiu-Dej, the release of political prisoners was a dogwhistle to the National Peasantist diaspora that "they should return home [and] no harm will come to them." Government agencies were by then directly probing into RNC activities. After capturing Crăciunaș, who became a communist double agent, they had direct access to the PNȚ Central Committee; they likewise blackmailed Veniamin into becoming their informant. The RNC remained factionalized: in 1964, Bessarabian PNȚ-ist Anton Crihan withdrew from its presidium over disagreements with other members.

PNȚ cells had continued to be formed in Romanian prisons. One such group was animated by Coposu and reportedly envisaged a democratic cabinet, with Gheorghe Zane as Premier. Although integrated into professional and social life, survivors of political repression were sometimes vocal dissidents. The Bucharest student movement of 1956 came with slogans such as "Down with the communists" and "Long live the National Peasants' Party". During the following year, the regime resumed its persecution, targeting more minor National Peasantists, including a 7-man cell in Ploiești, and arresting Vasile Georgescu Bârlad on charges that he was plotting to reestablish the party. Though he had been active in the Ploughmen's Front, Adrian Brudariu was arrested in December 1956, and sentenced for his earlier involvement with the PNȚ. Securitate agents noted that a Bessarabian wing of the PNȚ, which included an aged Halippa, was actively networking with other exiles and discussing plans for a post-Soviet Moldova. Also in 1957, Aiud Prison witnessed a hunger strike organized by PNȚ-ist and Guardist prisoners. Towards the end of the decade, the Securitate gathered evidence that a group of Bărăgan deportees, including Cezar Spineanu, were working on a new PNȚ platform.

Under Nicolae Ceaușescu, the PMR, renaming itself Romanian Communist Party (PCR), began extending recognition for interwar underground activists, or "illegalists", who were allowed to join its nomenklatura. Ceaușescu's guidelines resulted in scores of PNȚ leftists being honored with that title. Such overtures were not welcomed by the PNȚ-ist mainstream. Party cells were still being organized by former prisoners after that moment, often resorting to forms of passive resistance. From 1968, the National Peasantist exile recognized Coposu as a leader of the internal underground; his attempt to reorganize the party in the open was curbed by the Securitate in 1970. Meanwhile, Beza, having caused a series of embarrassments for the PCR regime, was allowed to emigrate in 1971. In 1973, several PNȚ-ists, including Coposu, Ionel Pop, Ion Diaconescu, Ion Puiu, and V. Ionescu-Galbeni, organized a memorial service for Maniu. The Securitate intervened in force, fearing that as many as 10,000 people would show up. Later that decade, Carandino issued his memoirs of party life in samizdat form, managing to have them published abroad in 1986.

Following the RNC's dissolution in 1975, Penescu established the Romanian National Council of Paris, which he led until his death in 1985, upon which he was replaced by Cicerone Ionițoiu. The 1980s saw the "reappearance of activists of the old political parties that had been banned in 1947", now involved in efforts to expose the communist regime's duplicity on the human rights' issue: "Former leaders of the National Peasant Party managed to recruit some young people, including workers, and to establish a human rights association with mostly young members in Bucharest and in Transylvania." During the election of 1985, with candidacies vetted by the PCR through its Front of Socialist Unity and Democracy, Puiu issued a PNȚ platform calling for political reforms. Puiu also attempted to run, and was consequently imprisoned. Placed under Securitate surveillance, Coposu denied claims that he was the party's new chairman, and even that there was such a thing as an "inner opposition" to the PCR. In 1986, together with Puiu and Carandino, he wrote a manifesto marking the 30th anniversary of the Hungarian Revolution. In other contexts, Coposu also acknowledged the PNȚ's existence and, in February 1987, obtained its recognition and induction by the Christian Democrat World Union. This affiliation was kept secret for almost three years.

Coposu was a direct participant in the Romanian Revolution of 1989, at the end of which democratic rule was formally restored. On December 22, the day of Ceaușescu's toppling, Coposu, Bărbuș, Diaconescu, Puiu and others signed an appeal to the population, as the "Christian Democratic National Peasants' Party", which was distributed the following day. It was registered on January 8, 1990, and viewed itself as a re-legalization or reestablishment of Maniu and Mihalache's movement. In February 1990, Carandino also relaunched Dreptatea as a new series of the pre-1947 newspaper. In 1995, the Supreme Court of Romania overturned all verdicts of treason passed against the PNȚ's defunct leadership.

== Ideology ==
=== Economic and social outlook ===
==== Core stances ====
Lucian Boia describes the PNȚ as an "eclectic" group "lacking a unified doctrine"; another historian, Damian Hurezeanu, speaks of the 1930s PNȚ as a "wide array spanning the distance between left-wing peasant radicalism and the nationalist right". Early on, the more powerful component of this mix was the former Romanian National Party (PNR). It had been formed in Austria-Hungary, specifically Transylvania, with the goal of channeling the Romanian vote, and following the establishment of Greater Romania in 1918–1922, led the rebellion against PNL centralism. One element which impeded categorization was Maniu's notorious reserve about declaring himself for or against various issues or approaches—leading him to be nicknamed "The Sphinx". Scholar Dimitrie Drăghicescu noted in 1922 that, overall, there was no ideological incompatibility between the PNL and the Transylvanians, proposing that Maniu and his entourage were primarily national liberals of bourgeois extraction, who had no doctrine of their own.

A similar point is made by Heinen, according to whom the PNR was by 1926 a "classic bourgeois-democratic" force, different from the PNL only in that it took up "Transylvanian interests". Stephen Fischer-Galați questions the consensus that Maniu was a liberal, referring to the PNȚ-ist leadership model as a "controlled democracy"; according to the scholar, Maniu and Carol differed only in the emphasis they placed on the premiership and the throne, respectively. Historian Vasile Dobrescu believes that PNR influence was the true conservative current of the unified party. Overall, according to Boia, Maniu "made few investments in ideology, he only had tactical refinements." In one of his pronouncements on the matter, Maniu explained that the PNR was non-ideological, being instead the unified voice of the Transylvanian Romanian community, "with all its centuries-old aspirations".

Through its "Peasantist" legacy, the PNȚ had a connection with the various strains of 19th-century agrarianism. PNL doctrinaire Ștefan Zeletin proposed that this group was a local avatar of "Physiocracy", in that they rejected mercantilism and saw the rural classes as a source for economic advancement. He dismissed such manifestations as typical of "primitive capitalism", and ultimately as doomed. As seen by Drăghicescu, the PȚ blended an Old-Kingdom component, which originated with the peasant associations founded by Constantin Dobrescu-Argeș and Toma Dragu, and a "foreign" component, which was Constantin Stere's Poporanism. Also according to Drăghicescu, the PȚ had managed to absorb the PNL's own agrarian wing (or Labor Party), becoming in part a replica of the latter.

From Poporanism, Mihalache's group inherited the notion of a "peasant state" or "peasant democracy"—a moderate take on the "peasant dictatorship" proposed by the Bulgarian Agrarianists. Some of the core assumptions in interwar Peasantism were also informed by Marxian economics, though contradicting all Marxist assumptions about peasantry as a recessive and reactionary class. The Peasantists were fundamentally anti-bourgeoisie in their outlook, which exposed them to suspicions that they were communists. Early on, the People's Party decried Madgearu as an agitator for "economic Bolshevism". Such inferences, Drăghicescu argues, were groundless: although "tactless" in their occasional "Marxist zeal", Peasantists rejected neither property nor inheritance, being "almost conservative" overall. A similar view is held by scholar Ion Ilincioiu, who sees the PNȚ's agrarian theory as fundamentally conservative, anti-industrial, and romantic. In generic terms, Madgearu favored economic liberalism and championed free trade as the basis for economic stability—in stated contradiction with the PNL's slogan, "ourselves alone".

The PNȚ program featured many of the PȚ's core ideas and promises, but omitted all reference to class conflict, and focused mostly on themes such as "national solidarity". Historian Angela Harre argues that post-Poporanism within the party was toned down even more by the Great Depression: "The resulting economic break-down mercilessly showed the connections between Romanian agriculture and international capitalism and, thus, ended the strategy of leaving capitalism aside and of jumping directly from feudalism into a better (socialist) future." According to Fischer-Galați, PNȚ politicos always subsumed Peasantism to the "greatest interest of the nation", including the "industrial bourgeoisie"; this, he argues, was an inherent flaw. Party doctrinaires paid tribute to various alternative models that could still protect peasants from economic modernity, "looking for a third way between liberalism and communism." In programmatic terms, the PNȚ favored "the free circulation of land", but short of land grabbing, proposing upper and lower limits on property purchase. As argued by Jelavich, in the early 1930s National Peasantism remained representative of the peasantry's "more prosperous section", incapable of assisting those "with only dwarf holdings or with no land at all".

==== Ideological experiments ====
Seen by Vasile Dobrescu as a "moderator and modulator" of Peasantist thought, one who personally ensured that Poporanist radicals were neutralized, Maniu always professed a belief in multilateralism and class collaboration. In 1924, Maniu argued that such integrative processes were interrelated, and together would create "major social and economic units". Around the same time, Peasantists had come to realize that smallholding units remained economically unviable, and prone to market exclusion. Explicitly complimented by Maniu, the cooperative movement won over Mihalache's Peasantist left. Within this current, the "integral" cooperatism was espoused by Victor Jinga, who believed that the "peasant state" was also the "cooperative state". This faction was specifically interested in Nordic agrarianism and the Danish cooperatives: in 1930, Mihalache sent some of his peasant friends, including writer Nicolae Vucu-Secășanu, for specialization in Denmark.

Cooperative enterprises were nevertheless absent from the party platforms of 1926 and 1935, with Mihalache only promising "organized and rationalized private property", without any details on what this meant. Although the party doctrines remained largely unchanged from that moment on, the following decade saw "vigorous debate" among PNȚ intellectuals, whose various takes on the "peasant state [...] were not always fully identical with the [party's] official views." However, as described by scholar Z. Ornea, Ralea's program in 1935 meant an infusion of center-left ideas into PNȚ policies. At that stage, the anti-industrial consensus was fading away, with developmentalism taking the forefront. Agrarian conservatism now focused on creating a strong industry in harmony with the smallholding units. In this context, some party eminences embraced dirigisme, and, in 1933, Maniu himself proposed that agricultural machinery and infant industries could be nationalized. This was contrasted by the behavior of other PNȚ leaders, four of whom were stockholders in multinational companies by 1937.

As opponents of both capitalism and communism, some PNȚ ideologues often veered into explicit support for social corporatism. This built on ideas first circulated by Stere in 1908, and, with Madgearu, became a more complex program for corporate representation. The "solidarist" version, embraced by Transylvanians such as Mihai Popovici, implied "peasant leadership, but without oppressing and marginalizing other social categories." In addition to promoting welfare reform, the PNȚ stood by a minimum wage and, as early as 1926, promoted collective bargaining as the solution to labor disputes. In 1936, Mihalache expressed a measure of sympathy for corporate statism, which he believed had been implemented by Italian fascism. Faced with negative reactions from the left, he revised his positions, noting that, whatever its merits, that particular regime could not be imported to Romania. Harre remarks that talk of a "peasant state" became vaguer ca. 1936, with Mihalache settling on references to "group democracy", which simply prioritized collective interests.

In 1944, Mihalache restated the party's commitments to its 1935 platform, insisting that the PNȚ would fashion a "workers' state" while still adhering to smallholding as the economic norm. In the party manifesto of October 1944, the supremacy of property was qualified by the addition: "land belongs to those who work it"; and by an endorsement of additional land reforms. As noted by Georgescu, the PNȚ was now radicalized along "Peasantist" lines, also promising the nationalization of heavy industry—and thus expanding its electoral base. Among the party intellectuals, Jinga was also pressing for a return to cooperative ideals, which he believed was made possible by postwar conditions. Mihalache's theories were soon challenged from within by younger militants such as Gabriel Țepelea. They argued that singularizing various categories of income into a "peasant class" was a fundamentally flawed approach. The new-generation activists held that the various peasant "strata" shared only a mutual apprehension against both socialism and free-trade liberalism; rather than commanding over a unified category, the PNȚ could form a peasant caucus.

From 1945, Țepelea signaled a trend, also embraced by other Maniu disciples, which identified National Peasantism with Christian democracy, defining social justice as a function of moral theology and personalism. Ideological clarifications were again curbed by other priorities. As noted by Hurezeanu, the "great theme" of PNȚ propaganda during 1944–1947 was the consolidation and preservation of democracy. As formulated by Țepelea, the struggle facing his party in 1945 was "to be, or not to be": "no longer an academic choice between monarchy and republic, but one opposing the defense of national identity with respect for some democratic principles to the acceptance of communist-imposed servitude." Situated more to the left, in 1947 Șerban Cioculescu wrote for Dreptatea: "I had sympathy for the communists while they were oppressed, but ceased liking them once they turned into oppressors."

=== Nationalism ===
==== Main currents ====
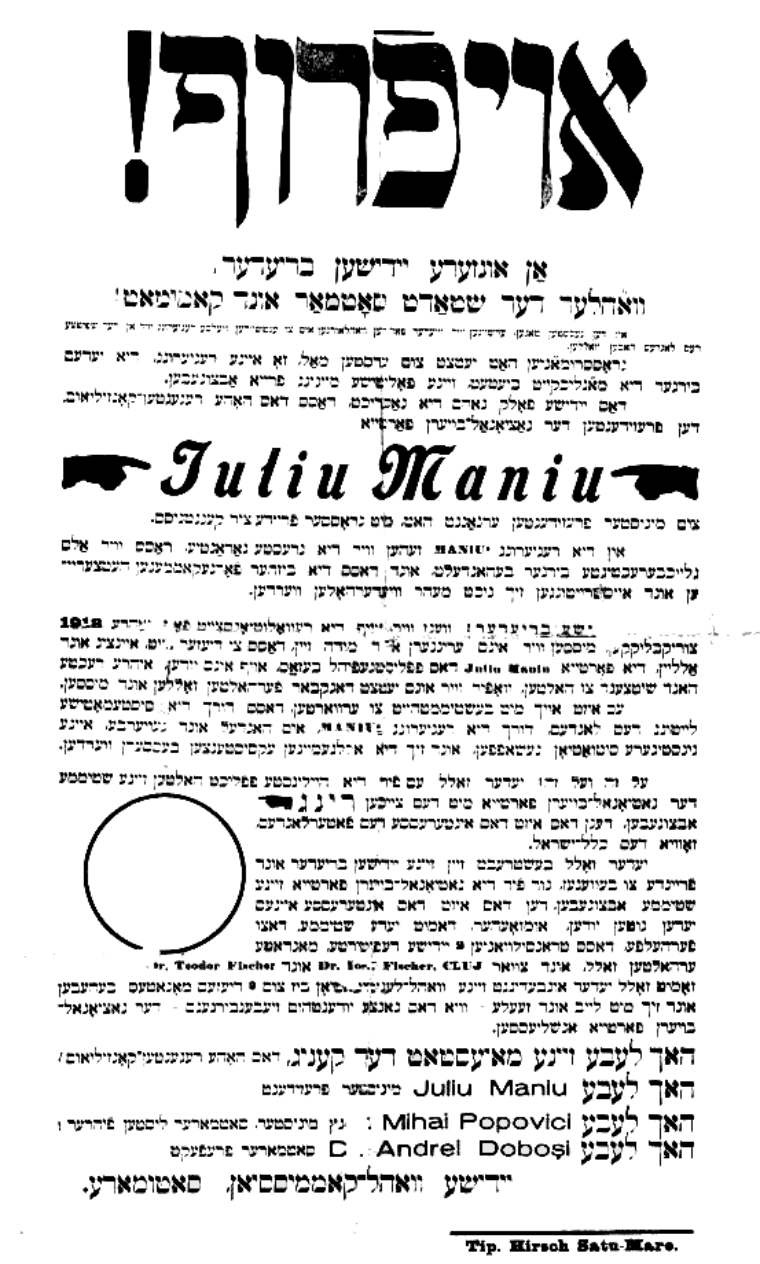
Yiddish electoral poster for the 1928 election, advertising Maniu's candidacy at Satu Mare

National Peasantism understood cultural nationalism as being compatible with democracy. Especially through its Transylvanian core, which had overseen the union process, the party saw Greater Romania as the product of democratic consultation. According to Maniu, Trianon "did not create, but merely acknowledged for an international public, a union between Transylvania and the Romanian Kingdom." As seen by Maniu, popular sovereignty was always ensured and verified through mass gatherings, replicating the Great National Assembly of Alba Iulia of 1918—though he remained skeptical of revolutionary masses. His unusually strict commitment to the democratic process was ridiculed by adversaries as "legalistic frenzy".

Maniu and many other PNR leaders belonged to a religious minority, namely the Greek Catholic Church. Sometimes chided by its bishops for favoring the predominant Eastern Orthodoxy, the PNȚ was still described by missionary priest Rafael Friedrich as "closest to the Catholic Church". The party mainstream stood by the promise of corporate rights for ethnic minorities, all of which would have found their place in the agrarianist state. As noted by Harre, this goal, "as well as the demand for a democratization and decentralization of the country might have calmed down many ethnic conflicts during the interwar period." In addition to sealing pacts with the minority parties, the PNȚ ran openly non-Romanian candidates on its lists; examples include Jews Tivadar Fischer, Mayer Ebner and Salomon Kinsbrunner, as well as Constantin Krakalia and Volodymyr Zalozetsky-Sas, who were Ukrainian. A Jewish steel magnate, Max Auschnitt, financed PNȚ projects both in interwar Romania and in exile.

The PNȚ's governments, with Aurel Vlad as Minister of Arts, were criticized by the Union of Romanian Jews for tolerating discrimination, in particular against Jews and Judaism; Vlad also informed minority leaders that decentralization had been postponed indefinitely. Shortly before the Lupeni debacle of 1929, regional representatives, including Augustin Popa, spoke out in favor of restoring economic nationalism. German Romanians, who had been especially enthusiastic about the PNȚ-ist promise to decentralize Romania, switched to supporting the Nazified German People's Party. Connections between PNȚ-ists and minorities were reactivated after World War II, when the PNȚ registered mass enlistments by non-Romanian anti-communists, including Swabians in Lugoj and Jews in Târgu Neamț.

Cosmopolitanism was supported by the various doctrinaires, including, in the mid 1930s, Ralea and Constantin Rădulescu-Motru. Both argued for non-xenophobic, secular, and conciliatory nationalism in polemics with one-time PNȚ associates such as Nae Ionescu and Nichifor Crainic. In 1937, Madgearu spoke about "Romanianization" as a goal of National Peasantist policies, but argued that this could only be achieved through price controls. A year after, Mihalache made reference to the "Jewish Question" and described the PNȚ as "equally nationalist" to all other parties, but still rejected "negative" antisemitism. The party's Transylvanian circles criticized fascism from a moderate nationalist position: Iuliu Moldovan's "biopolitics" and scientific racism had numerous points of contact with far-right antisemitism, but always remained more democratic than similar programs advanced by Romanian fascists. Ionel Pop argued in 1936 that vandalizing Jewish property was a cowardly act and a deflection, hinting that "Christian parties" would have done better to focus on chasing out an "evil spirit" that lurked in the corridors of power.

Maniu's own anti-fascism was rendered inconsistent his overtures toward the Iron Guard. During his conflict with Elena Lupescu, he emphasized her Jewish origin in what appeared to be an attempt at gaining support from the antisemitic caucus. Albeit limited in impact, Maniu's arrangements for 1937 are seen as a "tactical error", made possible by his "blind hatred" toward Carol. They "stifled the cause of democracy at a time when it was struggling for air", "rendering more respectability to Codreanu's public image". At the height of his conflict with Maniu, Mihalache allegedly noted: "Maniu will be removed from the party once he will join the Iron Guard once and for all". A defense witness at Codreanu's trial in 1938, Maniu insisted that the National Peasantists were neither totalitarian nor antisemitic. He therefore reported a "great difference" of conception between himself and the Guardists, with the only shared goal being returning Romania to a "solid base of Christian morality". As noted by Heinen, he was naive in believing that his national conservatism had common ground with Codreanu, who merely used Maniu.

==== Pan-nationalism, regionalism, trans-nationalism ====
PNȚ agrarian and Europeanist alliances: Bloc of Agrarian Countries Maniu Plan for a federal "Little Europe"

Anti-communism as expressed by the PNȚ's mainstream was also motivated by nationalist priorities, with party men such as Grigore Gafencu urging for the strong defense of Bessarabia against Soviet demands and incursions. Although Poporanist traditions included criticism of Romanian "militarism", PNȚ governments were hawkish on this issue, and kept up defense spending. Interwar National Peasantists were also curious about the Moldavian ASSR, created by Romanian-speakers inside Soviet Ukraine, and made oblique references to it as a Romanian irredenta. Concurrently, Maniu's attempt to reduce spending by downsizing intelligence agencies led to allegations that he was serving communist interests. The party's leftist faction was in fact cautious about criticizing the Soviet regime—Victor Eftimiu noted in 1932 that the "capitalist press" was probably overstating Soviet negatives. An overtly pro-Soviet attitude was embraced in 1940 by former PNȚ leftists Alexandru Mîță and Gheorghe Stere.

In July 1940, Maniu noted that he could no longer trust Soviet foreign policy, specifically citing its occupation of Bessarabia, as well as its war on Finland, as contributing factors. He revised the party's stances in 1941, when he condemned the Soviets while castigating war beyond Bessarabia's border as "aggression". The Bloc of Democratic Parties could only be forged once the Soviet Union dissolved the Comintern, which had opposed the notion of Greater Romania. Maniu's acceptance of the 1944 armistice also excluded Bessarabia from Romania's borders, but this remained a contentious issue inside the party. Ghiță Popp attempted to persuade Maniu to reconsider, while Halippa went public with his critique of the cession in 1946. Pan-Romanianism remained central in disputes between Halippa and Anton Crihan, even after 1970.

Despite endorsing the nation state, Transylvanian party members remained vexed about PNL centralism, and came to promote regionalism as the alternative. The slogan "Transylvania for the Transylvanians" was taken up by Vaida-Voevod during his early activism with the party; it was also a form of nativism, directed specifically against Old-Kingdom bureaucrats sent into the region. The party's very creation had blocked the PȚ's slow extension into Transylvania, which PNR leaders had found unpalatable. Historian Thomas Gerard Gallagher proposes that Maniu valued political liberties more than "national power", which implied that he resented centralism. As such, the 1928 takeover came with Maniu's promise that he would bridge national cohesion and regional identities, but this objective was left unfulfilled when economic issues took the forefront. Beyond decentralization, regionalism and autonomism made occasional comebacks in National Peasantist discourse during the later interwar. In 1931, party militant Romulus Boilă published a proposal to redivide Romania's administration along regional affiliations, but it was largely ignored by the public.

Hungarian spies claimed in 1940 that Maniu intended to proclaim an autonomous Transylvania under Soviet protection, in order to prevent its partitioning. The accuracy of such reports remains doubtful. Although formally rejecting regionalism in 1944, the PNȚ still advocated a decentralized model during the reintegration of Northern Transylvania: a part-regionalist agenda was a basis for the Commissariat of the Liberated Regions. As a corollary of his support for cooperative endeavors and defense of minority rights, Maniu championed Balkan federalism and Europeanism, both of which were referred to in his speeches of the 1920s and '30s; he viewed himself as agreeing with specific transnational proposals advanced by Nicolae Titulescu and André Tardieu. In part, such tenets reflected the PNȚ-ist stances on Transylvanian autonomy: Maniu regarded István Bethlen's autonomism as a front for Hungarian revisionism, and proposed instead that Hungary and Romania be joined into a Central European Confederation. As envisaged by Maniu, the "Little European" union was also set to include 6 other states, from Austria to Greece. An offer to join was also extended to Italy, seen by Maniu as a military guarantee for the confederation, alongside Poland. His and Mironescu's premierships brought direct talks over transforming the Little Entente into a single market.

Fischer-Galați argues that, of all the Peasantist movements emerging in 1920s Eastern Europe, Romania and Bulgaria's were the only ones which had a tangible chance of succeeding. The PNȚ inherited an international profile from Mihalache's group, which had adhered to a transnational "agrarian league" formed by the Bavarian People's Party. National Peasantists joined the International Agrarian Bureau (IAB) as the Bureau made its first-ever recruitment drive outside Slavic Europe, with an invitation having been first addressed to the PȚ in 1924. From 1929 party also participated in the International Entente of Radical and Similar Democratic Parties, which until its dissolution in 1938 served as international platform for parties mainly in the League of Nations structures. In the 1930s, Madgearu was also able to form a "Bloc of Agrarian Countries", which he championed as a reduced version of Maniu's federalism. PNȚ contributions to the International Peasants' Union, which called for a liberation of the Eastern bloc and supported European federalism, were depicted as continuing the IAB affiliation.

== PNȚ symbols ==
PNȚ eye logo, as used in the elections of 1946

Before 1938, the PNȚ used as its electoral symbol a plain circle—which party propaganda also described as a "ring", "wheel", or "sun". Originally used by the Progressive Conservative Party, and then, briefly, by Mihalache's PȚ, it was imposed on the PNR by its allies during the formation of the National–Peasant Bloc in 1926. Coincidentally or not, most of the PNȚ's rivals on the interwar agrarian scene, from the National Agrarian Party and the Romanian Front to the Radical Peasants' Party and the Lupists, used circular icons as their logos. The similarities had various results: while the Front claimed to have lost votes in the resulting confusion, the PȚD-L "would have reportedly taken no mandates had it not used for a sign two overlaid wheels".

The PNȚ made a point of not using any political color. According to a 1936 communique jibing at the rise of fascism, the Peasant Guards could only wear badges showing the Romanian tricolor—"and not signs borrowed from our [country's] centuries-old enemies." Colored symbols were unofficial, but attested from 1928, when PNȚ organizations in Bihor had tens of flags of unspecified shades. Formed the following year, Voinici groups also carried such symbols, and had a hierarchy which included "flag-bearers". Accounts of the period suggest that these carried the Romanian tricolor, or flags inscribed with the party name. Additionally, Voinici appropriated the Roman salute, which became their official greeting.

In 1930, peasant voters from the Bessarabian town of Vaisal are known to have rallied under a red flag with a circle. Months after, the party newspaper Țara de Mâine informed its readers that "the symbolic color of peasant (or agrarian, agricultural etc.) parties is green." A rally held in June 1932 saw the various chapters carrying either flags marked with circles of square-shaped green flags. PNȚ youths appeared at a June 1935 rally in Iași wearing green shirts—with green described as the "party color". This custom was also observed at 1936 marches, during which National Peasantist youths flew green flags, described in one account as bearing a golden clover. Distinctively, the Peasant Guards of Argeș County had green and triangular pennons, while party cells observed in Mehedinți used both green banners and national flags defaced with the circle. Reports of these rallies also suggest that PNȚ cadres used both the Roman salute, of alleged fascist inspiration, and the raised fist, which had leftist connotations. By October 1936, Eftimiu had composed Cântecul țăranilor ("Song of the Peasants"), which was used as a party anthem.

Unlike Vaida's Front, the PNȚ was not affected by Tătărescu's ordinance of March 1937, which outlawed party colors and political uniforms. Standardized electoral symbols were themselves outlawed in 1938; during the abortive electoral campaign of that year, parties ran under a "numbered dots" system, which reflected their order of registration. A controversy erupted when the PNȚ was assigned five dots, despite registering third. Maniu fought against the measure and obtained a three-dot symbol. For the ill-fated elections of 1946, the PNȚ used a depiction of the human eye as its logo. During early talks for an alliance with the PNL, it also registered a house icon. In August 1946, it sought to reclaim that symbol as its own, but the Electoral Commission refused to grant them this change. In his subsequent speeches, Maniu associated the eye with the need for lucidity, as in: to keep one's eyes wide open. Where the PNȚ was discouraged from participating, hand-painted images of the eye became signals of popular discontent. Following the 1947 clampdown, the symbol was also prohibited, leading overzealous officials in Gorj County to demand that church murals featuring the Eye of Providence (which they read as "Maniu's Eye") be painted over.

== Scissions and mergers ==
=== Parties seceded from the PNȚ ===
- Peasants' Party–Lupu (1927)
- Democratic Peasants' Party–Stere (1931)
- Radical Peasants' Party (1933)
- Romanian Front (1935)
- Socialist Peasants' Party (1938)
- National Peasants' Party–Alexandrescu (1944)
- Democratic Peasants' Party–Lupu (1946)

=== Parties absorbed by the PNȚ ===
- Peasants' Party–Lupu (1937)

== Electoral history ==
=== Legislative elections ===
Election	Votes	Percentage	Assembly	Senate	Position	Aftermath^{1}
1926	727,202	28.4	69 / 387	8 / 115	2nd	Opposition to PP government (1926–1927)
1927	610,149	22.5	54 / 387	17 / 113	2nd	Opposition to PNL government (1927–1928)
1928	2,208,922	79.2	326 / 387	105 / 113	1st	PNȚ government (1928–1931)
1931	438,747	15.4	30 / 387	1 / 113	2nd	Opposition to PND minority government (1931–1932)
1932	1,203,700	41.5	274 / 387	104 / 113	1st	PNȚ government (1932–1933)
1933	414,685	14.2	29 / 387	0 / 108	2nd	Opposition to PNL government (1933–1937)
1937	626,612	20.7	86 / 387	10 / 113	2nd	Opposition to PNC minority government (1937–1938)
Parliament suspended						Extra-parliamentary opposition to Miron Cristea's monarchist government (1938–1939)
1939	Party banned		0 / 258	0 / 88	–	Extra-parliamentary opposition to FRN monarchist government (1939–1940)
Parliament suspended						Extra-parliamentary opposition to the National Legionary State (1940–1941)
Parliament suspended						Extra-parliamentary opposition to Ion Antonescu's military government (1941–1944)
Parliament suspended						FND-PNL-PNȚ government (1944–1945)
Parliament suspended						Extra-parliamentary opposition to FND government (1945–1946)
1946	881,304	12.9	33 / 414	Senate abolished	2nd	Opposition to BPD government (1946–1947)

Notes:

^{1} Almost always, the government was named before parliamentary elections and confirmed afterwards.
