= Mihail Roșianu =

Romanian diplomat (1900–1973)

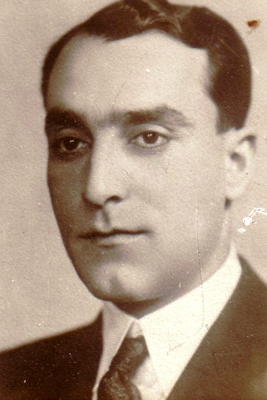

Mihail Roșianu (20 October 1900–28 July 1973) was a Romanian Communist official and diplomat.

== Biography ==
Roșianu worked as a teacher from 1926. He was a member of Communist Party affiliated organizations such as the Amicii URSS and the Red Aid. In 1934 he joined the then illegal Communist Party. In 1927, after founding a powerful peasant organization in his native commune, he became general secretary of the Vâlcea organization, and in 1928, head of sector of the National Peasants' Party organization. In 1932 he was elected deputy and defended the interests of teachers in the Chamber. He was secretary of the county peasant organization (1937) and its president in 1940.

In May 1944, Roșianu was called to Bucharest where he was entrusted with the task of dealing with the escape from the Târgu Jiu camp of Gheorghe Gheorghiu-Dej and the other leaders of the labor movement. The reason why he was chosen is that, unlike other party members under the attention of the Security, Roșianu had a possibility of movement that they did not have. In his capacity as a school inspector for Gorj and Vâlcea counties, he had frequent trips to these counties, but also to Bucharest. The escape took place on the night of August 10, 1944.

After the war, Roșianu was elected as a member or alternate member of the central committee of the Romanian Workers' Party. He also served as president of the Romanian Broadcasting Society from March 1952 to February 1954 and deputy minister of culture from October 1953 to February 1954. He was then sent as ambassador to the People's Republic of Bulgaria and the Hungarian People's Republic between 1956 and 1966.
