= Peasants' Party–Lupu =

Peasants' Party–Lupu Partidul Țărănesc–Lupu
- Leader: Nicolae L. Lupu
- Founded: 1927
- Dissolved: 1937
- Split from: Peasants' Party
- Merged into: National Peasants' Party
- Ideology: Agrarianism; Poporanism; Agrarian socialism
- Political position: Left-wing

The Peasants' Party–Lupu (Romanian: Partidul Țărănesc–Lupu, PȚ–Lupu) was a political party in Romania.

== History ==
The party was formed by Nicolae L. Lupu in 1927 after the Peasants' Party merged into the National Peasants' Party. In the 1928 general elections it received 2.5% of the vote, winning five seats in the Chamber of Deputies. It increased its vote share to 3.5% in the 1931 elections, winning seven seats. After receiving 6% of the vote in the 1932 elections the party won 12 seats in the Chamber and one seat in the Senate. However, it lost one Chamber seat and its Senate seat in the 1933 elections as its vote share fell to 5.5%.

== Electoral history ==
=== Legislative elections ===
Election	Votes	%	Chamber	Senate	Position
1928	70,506	2.5	5 / 387	0 / 110	5th
1931	100,682	3.5	7 / 387	0 / 113	7th
1932	170,860	5.9	12 / 387	1 / 113	4th
1933	152,167	5.2	11 / 387	0 / 113	8th
