= Worker-Peasant Bloc =

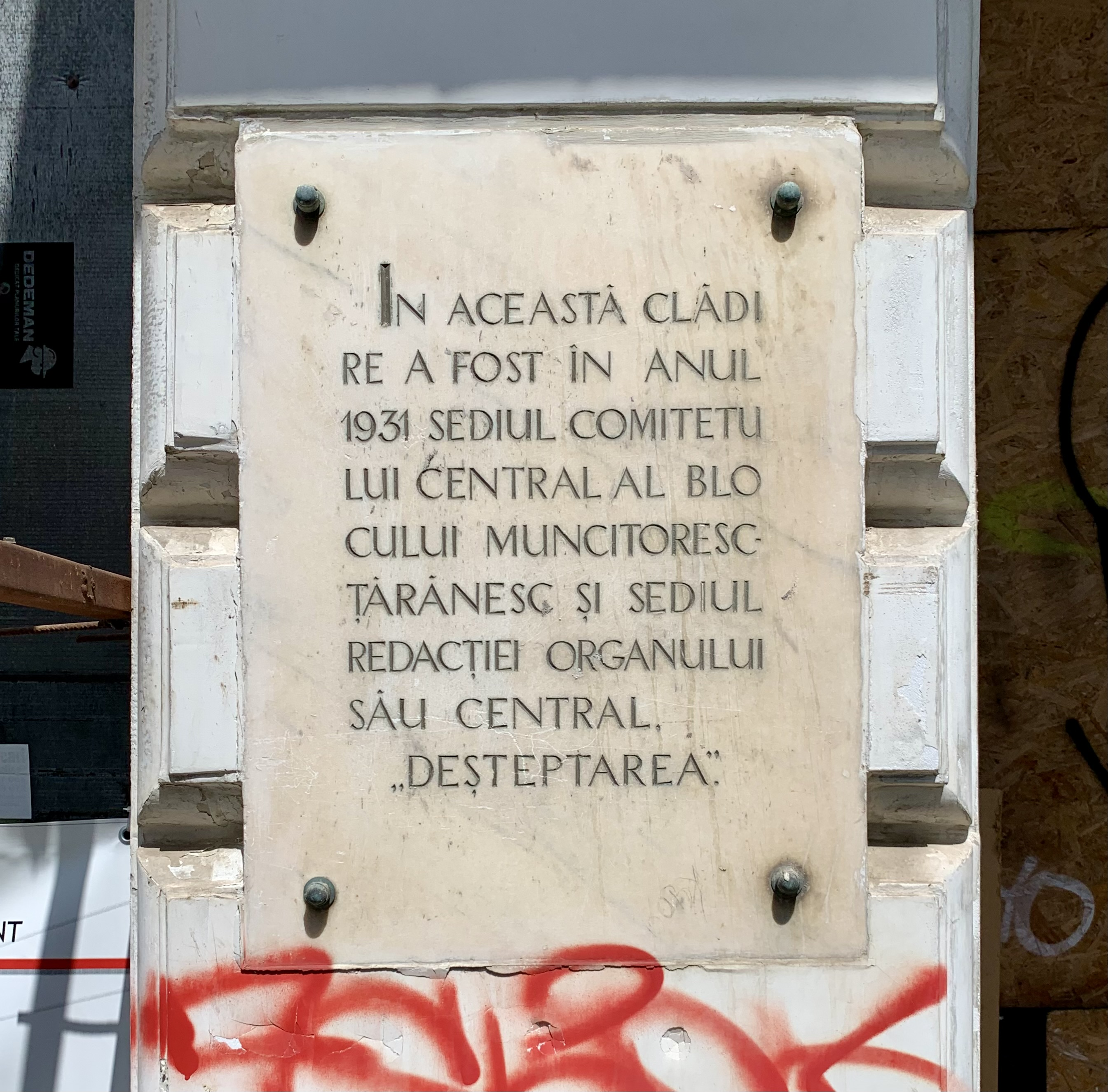
Plaque on the facade of 25 Calea Moșilor in Bucharest reading "In 1931 this building was the headquarters of the Central Committee of the Worker-Peasant Bloc and the location of the editorial office of its central organ 'Deșteptarea'"

The Worker-Peasant Bloc (Romanian: Blocul Muncitoresc-Țărănesc, BMȚ) was a political party in Romania that acted as a front group for the banned Romanian Communist Party (PCR).

== History ==
In the 1926 elections the BMȚ received 1.5% of the vote, failing to win a seat. The 1927 elections saw the party's vote share fall to 1.3%, again failing to win a seat. Although the 1928 elections saw their vote share increase to 1.4%, they remained seatless.

The 1931 elections were the party's breakthrough, winning five seats in the Chamber of Deputies with 2.5% of the vote. The parliament refused to validate the elections of the five deputies and none of them served. However, the 1932 elections saw its vote share fall to 0.3%, with the party failing to win a seat. It was banned in the aftermath of the Grivița Strike of 1933, and did not contest any further elections. Its role as a communist front organization was partially taken over by the Labour League, created a few weeks before the 1933 elections.

== Election results ==
=== Parliamentary elections ===
Election	Votes	%	Chamber	Senate	Position
1926	39,203	1.5	0 / 387	0 / 115	6th
1927	31,505	1.3	0 / 387	0 / 113	6th
1928	38,851	1.4	0 / 387	0 / 110	6th
1931	73,716	2.6	5 / 387	0 / 113	10th
1932	9,441	0.3	0 / 387	0 / 113	17th
