= 1932 Romanian general election =

Romania 1932 elections: National Peasants' Party-German Party alliance won majority

- 17–26 July 1932

All 387 seats in the Chamber of Deputies All 113 seats in the Senate
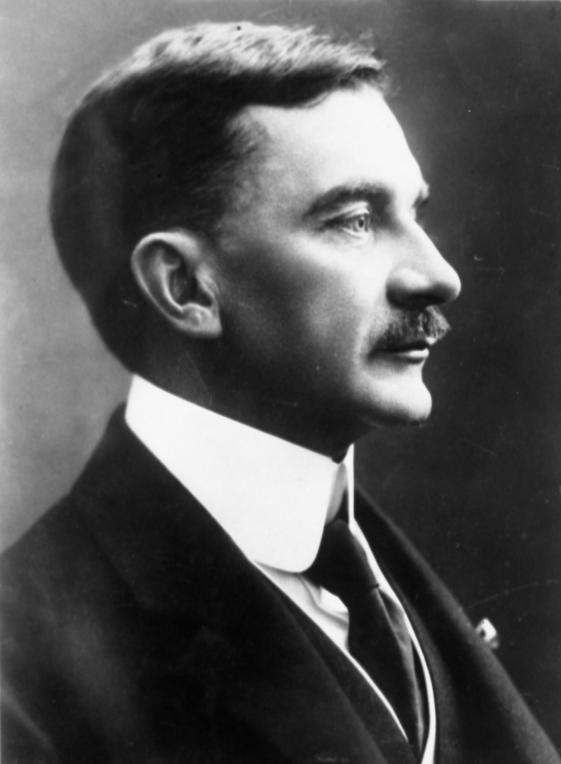

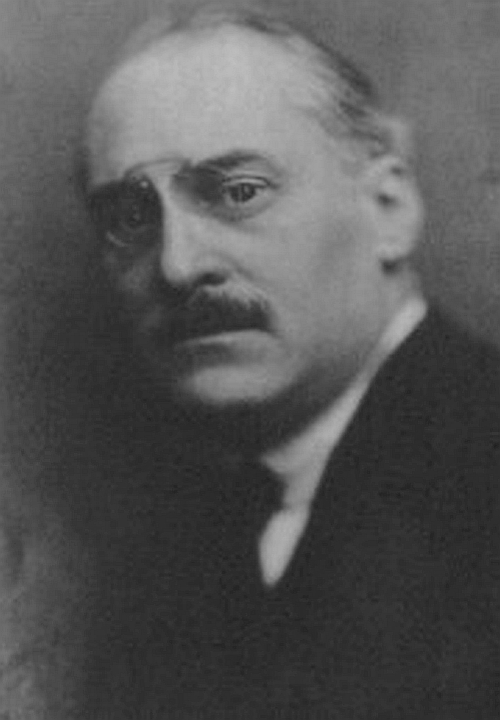

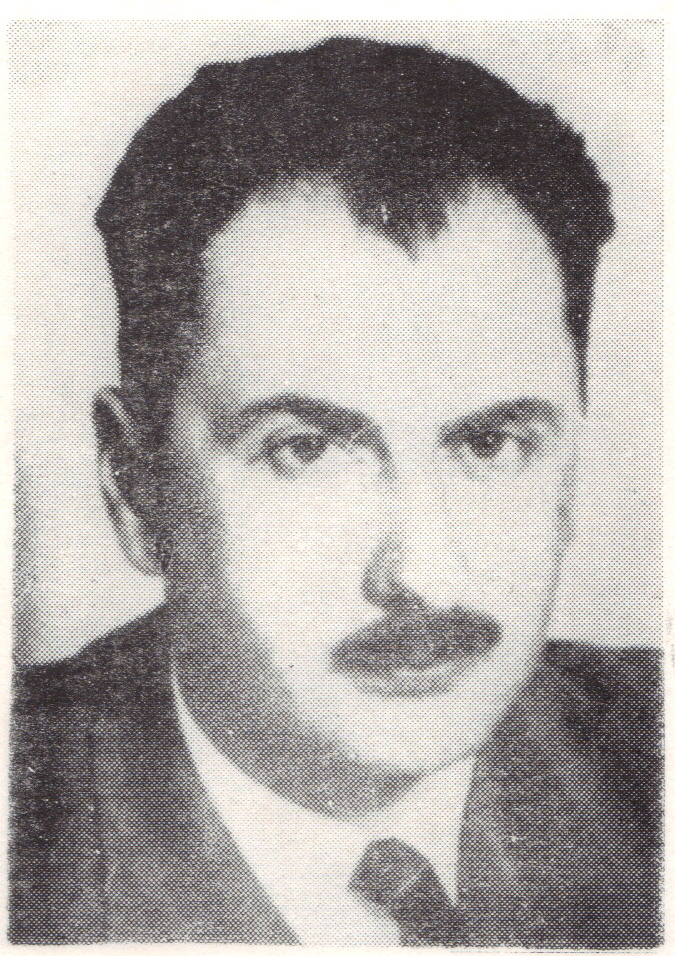
	Majority party	Minority party	Third party
Leader	Iuliu Maniu	Ion Duca	Gheorghe Brătianu
Party	PNȚ+PG	PNL	PNL–Brătianu
Seats won	104 S / 274 C	1 S / 28 C	0 S / 14 D
Seat change	▲103 S / ▲244 C	▼10 S / ▼52 C	0 S / ▲2 D
Popular vote	1,203,700 D	407,023 D	195,048 D
Percentage	41.52%	14.04%	6.73%
Prime Minister before election
Alexandru Vaida-Voevod
PNȚ
Subsequent Prime Minister
Alexandru Vaida-Voevod
PNȚ

General elections were held in Romania in July 1932. The Chamber of Deputies was elected on 17 July, whilst the Senate was elected in three stages on 20, 24 and 26 July. The result was a victory for the governing National Peasants' Party-German Party alliance, which won 274 of the 387 seats in the Chamber of Deputies and 104 of the 113 seats in the Senate elected through universal male vote. Of the 274 Chamber seats, 265 were taken by the National Peasant's Party and nine by the German Party.

== Results ==
=== Chamber of Deputies ===
Party	Votes	%	Seats	+/–
National Peasants' Party–German Party	1,203,700	41.52	274	+244
National Liberal Party	407,023	14.04	28	–
National Liberal Party–Brătianu	195,048	6.73	14	+2
Peasants' Party–Lupu	170,860	5.89	12	+5
National-Christian Defense League	159,071	5.49	11	+3
Magyar Party	141,894	4.89	14	+4
National Agrarian Party	108,857	3.75	8	New
Social Democratic Party	101,068	3.49	7	+1
Codreanu Group	70,674	2.44	5	New
National Union (Note: Of the five seats won by the National Union (an alliance of the National Party–Iorga, the Democratic Nationalist Party and the Agrarian Union Party), the National Party–Iorga took three and the Agrarian Union Party two.)	68,116	2.35	5	–
Jewish Party	67,582	2.33	5	+1
People's Party	64,525	2.23	4	–6
Traders Council	45,851	1.58	0	New
Democratic Peasants' Party–Stere	41,454	1.43	0	–5
Conservative Party	18,643	0.64	0	New
Agrarian League	14,831	0.51	0	New
Peasant Workers' Bloc	9,441	0.33	0	–5
Civic Union	1,503	0.05	0	New
Other parties	9,178	0.32	0	–
Total	2,899,319	100.00	387	0
Valid votes	2,899,319	97.06		
Invalid/blank votes	87,810	2.94		
Total votes	2,987,129	100.00		
Registered voters/turnout	4,220,731	70.77		
Source: Sternberger et al., Nohlen & Stöver

=== Senate ===
Party	Seats	+/–
National Peasants' Party–German Party	104	+103
Magyar Party	3	–1
National-Christian Defense League	2	+2
Democratic Peasant Party	2	New
National Liberal Party	1	–
Peasants' Party–Lupu	1	+1
Total	113	0
Source: Nohlen & Stöver
