= Silviu Craciunas =

Romanian writer

Silviu Craciunas (in Romanian: Crăciunaș; 1914–1998) was a Romanian writer, best known for his 1961 book The Lost Footsteps. That is his account of his own imprisonment, alleged torture and persecution at the hands of Romanian Communists. The book was praised when it came out in the West in 1961, receiving positive reviews in The Economist and the Times Literary Supplement among others. However, it has been alleged that Craciunas had worked as an informant and a double agent in the pay of the Romanian Communist secret police, the Securitate, and that parts of his book were authored by the secret police for disinformation purposes. He lived the last years of his life in the United Kingdom.

== Life ==
Craciunas was born in Miluan in northwestern Romania, as the son of an Orthodox priest. He studied medicine and then law at Cluj University, receiving his doctorate in Law and Economics and Political Science in 1940. A former member of the fascist Iron Guard, after 1945 he supported the National Peasants' Party.

He worked in the glass and sugar industries, prior to the communist takeover of the country. The communists nationalized all privately owned factories in 1948, and Craciunas ostensibly became involved in the anti-communist underground movement, helping to smuggle people out of Romania.

Craciunas was arrested in 1938 for having fascist manifestoes on him.

In 1948, he was arrested for having helped people flee Romania, and after reaching an agreement with the Securitate, it seems he was sent abroad posing as a refugee but really to act as an informant for the security forces. In Paris, he made contact with the Romanian National Committee, a Romanian anti-Communist exiles' organisation. With the help of Western intelligence agencies, in 1949 he secretly returned to Romania and submitted to the Securitate a report on the Romanian exile community. But then after a few months, he was arrested by Romanian authorities on suspicion of being a double agent working for the West. He spent four years in the Malmaison prison, after which he was transferred to a prison hospital in Suceava, from which he managed to "escape".

In 1955, he signed a formal agreement with the Securitate to work for them as an informer. In 1957, he returned to the West, where he obtained political asylum in Great Britain in 1959. In 1977, he emigrated to Spain, where he stayed for ten years, then returned to Great Britain.

Craciunas died in Brighton and Hove, in 1998.

== Book ==
- The Lost Footsteps, London: Collins & Harvill Press, 1961, translated into several languages

== Bibliography ==
- Urme pierdute, urme regasite- Cazul Silviu Craciunas, eds. Dinu Zamfirescu, Dumitru Dobre, and Iulia Moldovan, Institutul National pentru Memoria Exilului Romanesc, Editura Militara, 2006
