= 1933 Romanian general election =

- 20–29 December 1933

All 387 seats in the Chamber of Deputies All 108 seats in the Senate
- Turnout: 68.00%
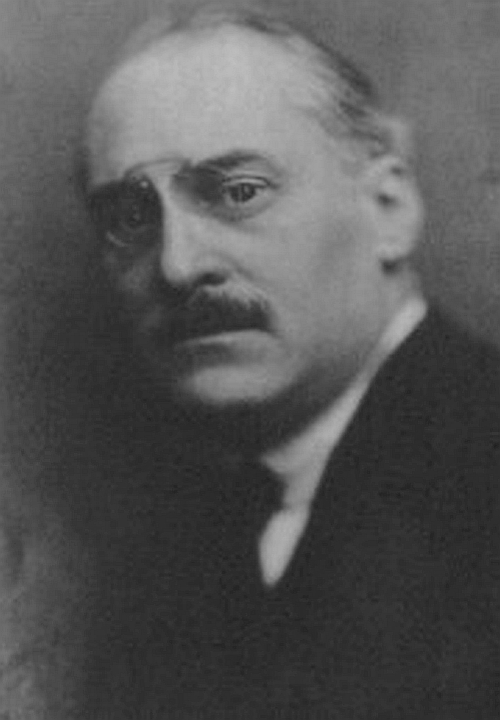

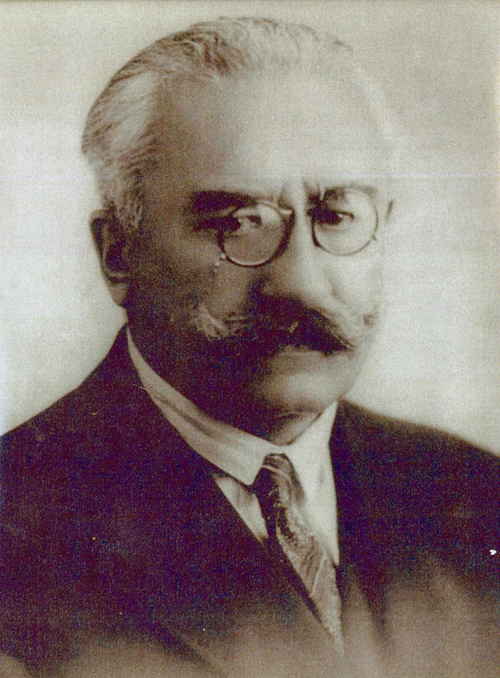

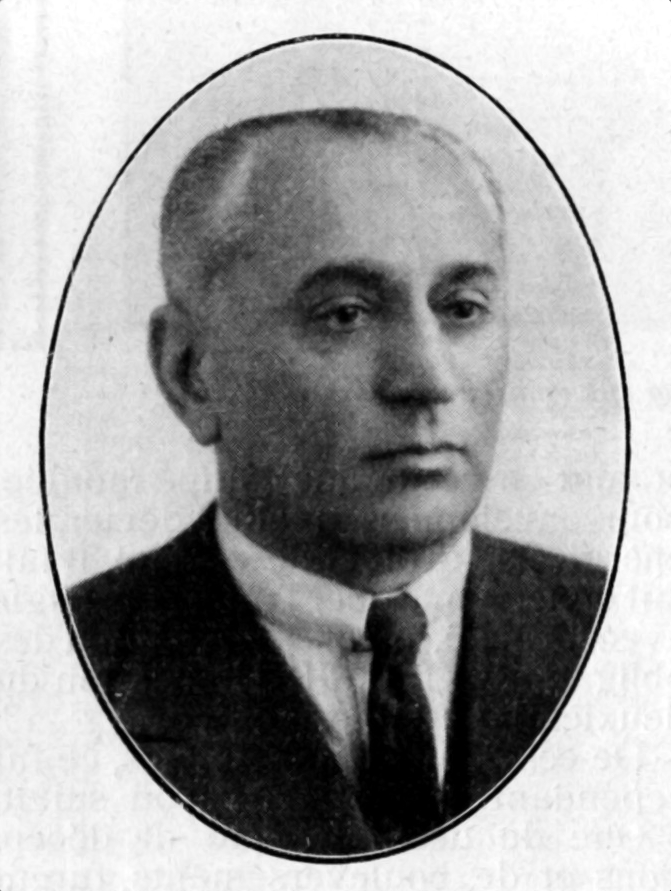

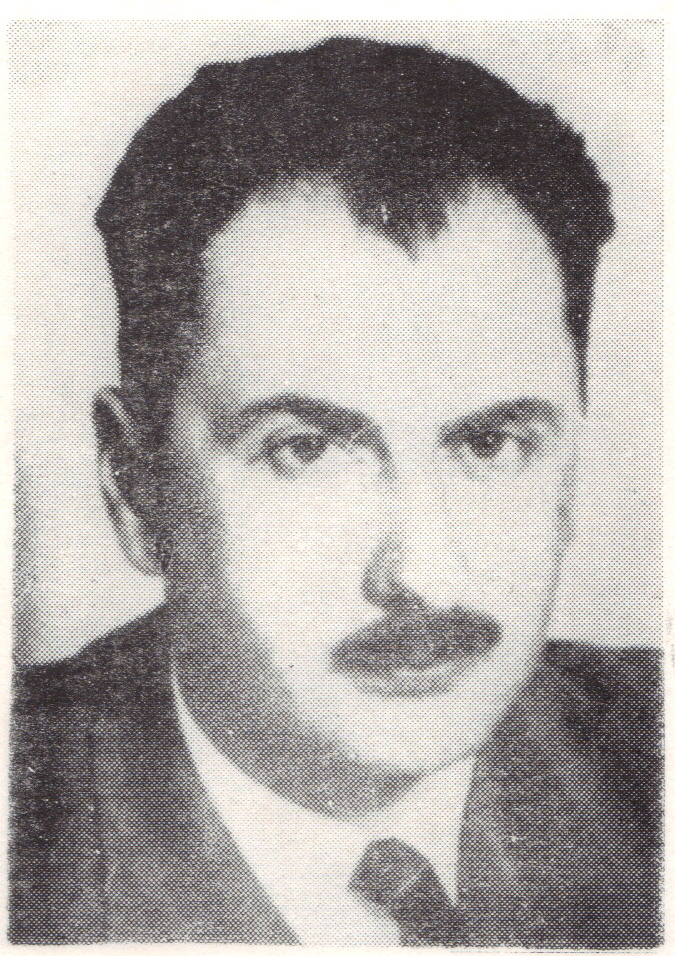

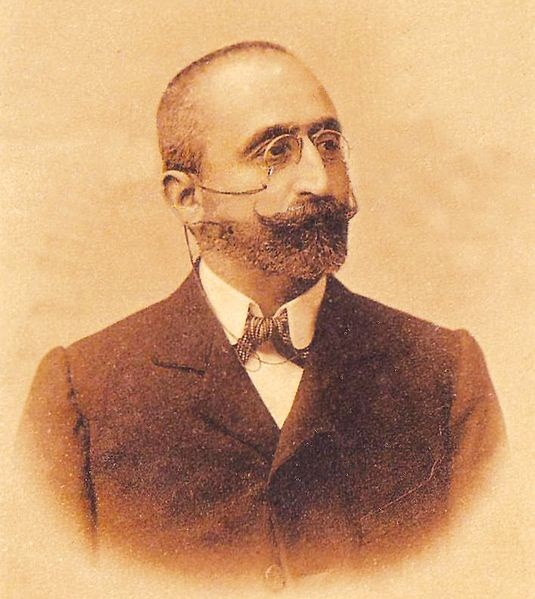

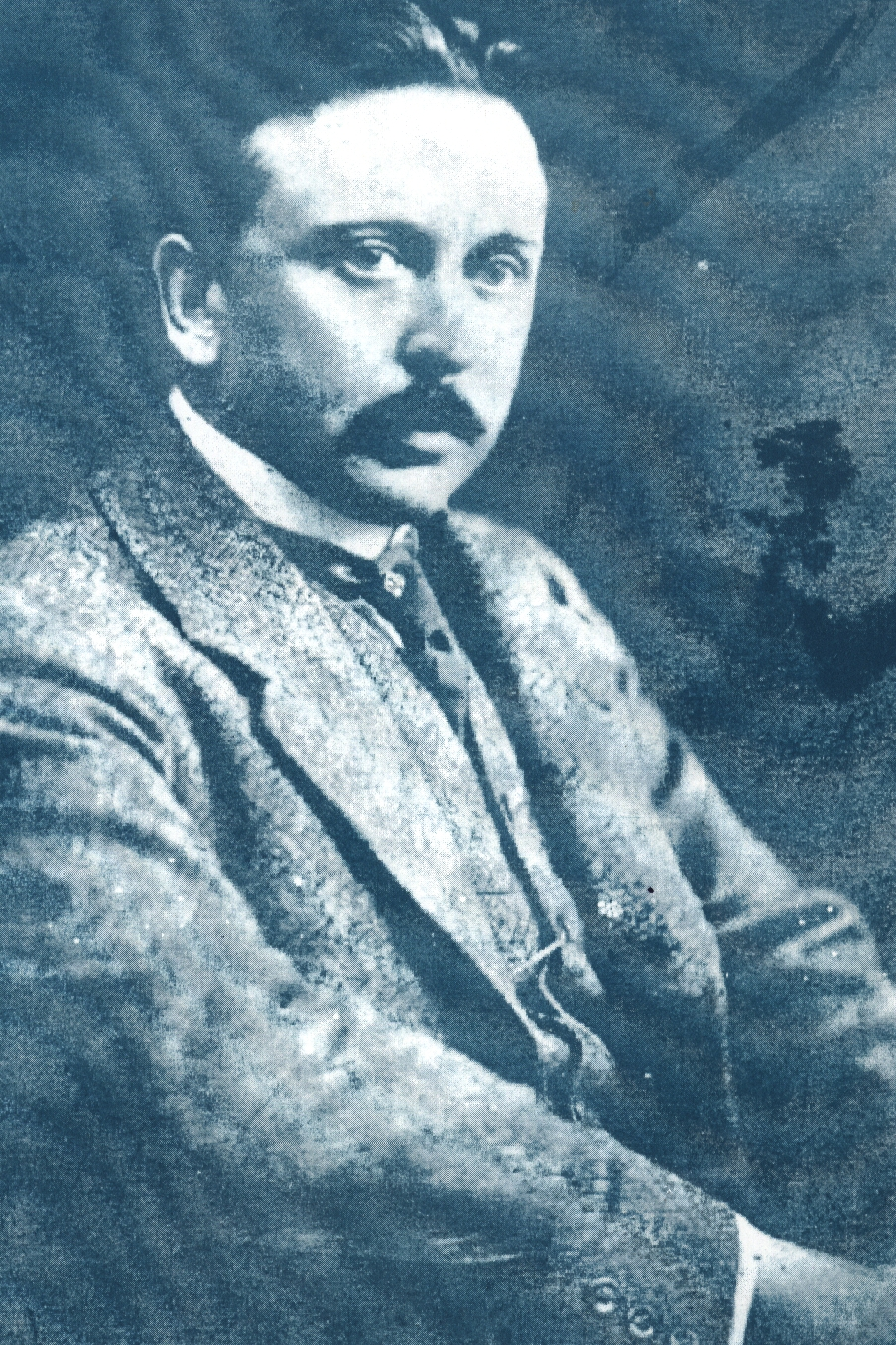
	First party	Second party	Third party
Leader	Ion Duca	Alexandru Vaida-Voevod	Nicolae Lupu
Party	PNL	PNȚ	PȚ–Lupu
Leader since	1930	1933	1927
Last election	1 S / 28 D	104 S / 265 D	1 S / 12 D
Seats won	105 S / 300 D	0 S / 29 D	0 S / 11 D
Seat change	▲104 S / ▲272 D	▼104 S / ▼236 D	▼1 S / ▼1 D
Popular vote	1,518,864 D	414,685 D	152,167 D
Percentage	52.02% D	14.20% D	5.21% D
	Fourth party	Fifth party	Sixth party
Leader	Gheorghe Brătianu	Alexandru Cuza	Octavian Goga
Party	PNL–Brătianu	LANC	PNA
Leader since	1930	1923	1932
Last election	0 S / 14 D	2 S / 11 D	2 S / 11 D
Seats won	0 S / 10 D	0 S / 9 D	0 S / 9 D
Seat change	0 S / ▼4 D	▼2 S / ▼2 D	0 S / ▲1 D
Popular vote	147,665 D	133,205 D	121,748 D
Percentage	5.06% D	4.56% D	4.17% D
Prime Minister before election
Ion Duca
PNL
Subsequent Prime Minister
Gheorghe Tătărescu
PNL

General elections were held in Romania in December 1933, the third in three years. The Chamber of Deputies was elected on 20 December, whilst the Senate was elected in three stages on 22, 28 and 29 December.

The result was a victory for the governing National Liberal Party (PNL), which won 300 of the 387 seats in the Chamber of Deputies and 105 of the 108 seats in the Senate elected through universal male suffrage.

== Results ==
=== Chamber of Deputies ===
Party	Votes	%	Seats	+/–
National Liberal Party	1,518,864	52.02	300	+272
National Peasants' Party	414,685	14.20	29	–236
Peasants' Party–Lupu	152,167	5.21	11	–1
National Liberal Party–Brătianu	147,665	5.06	10	–4
National-Christian Defense League	133,205	4.56	9	–2
National Agrarian Party	121,748	4.17	9	+1
Magyar Party	119,562	4.09	8	–6
Radical Peasants' Party	82,930	2.84	6	New
Agrarian Union Party	73,208	2.51	5	+3
People's Party–Conservative Party	47,114	1.61	0	–4
Jewish Party	38,565	1.32	0	–5
Social Democratic Party	37,672	1.29	0	–7
Citizen Bloc	13,560	0.46	0	0
Ploughmen's Front	7,970	0.27	0	New
Labour League	3,515	0.12	0	New
United Socialist Party	1,644	0.06	0	New
Labour Party and Traders' Council	1,328	0.05	0	0
Independents	4,391	0.15	0	–
Total	2,919,793	100.00	387	0
Valid votes	2,919,793	98.02		
Invalid/blank votes	58,955	1.98		
Total votes	2,978,748	100.00		
Registered voters/turnout	4,380,354	68.00		
Source: Sternberger et al., Nohlen & Stöver, Monitorul oficial

=== Senate ===
Party	Seats	+/–
National Liberal Party	105	+104
Magyar Party	3	0
Total	108	–5
Source: Nohlen & Stöver
