= League Against Usury =

League Against Usury Liga contra Cametei Liga împotriva Cametei
- President: Emanuel Antonescu (1929–1932); Collective leadership (1932)
- Founded: August 17, 1929
- Dissolved: December 1932
- Merged into: Agrarian Union Party
- Succeeded by: Guard for the Defense of Private Property
- Headquarters: Bucharest; 1931: Batiștei Street 17; 1932: Aleea Alexandru 18; 1932: Edgar Quinet Street 9
- Newspaper: Jos Camăta; Liga Contra Cametei; Desrobirea
- Ideology: Single-issue (Debt relief); Big tent Agrarianism; Producerism; Economic antisemitism Fascism (minority)
- Political position: Center-left to far-right
- National affiliation: Front for Urban Debt-clearance (1932)
- Slogan: Dobânda este un furt ce nu trebuie plătit ("Interest is theft that we should not cover")

The League Against Usury (Romanian: Liga contra Cametei, LCC, or Liga împotriva Cametei, sometimes shortened to Liga Cametei, "Usury League") was a single-issue, mainly agrarian, political party in Romania. Formed in late 1929 as a political answer to the Great Depression, it involved itself in the fight against "usury" (or predatory lending), bringing together politicians on all sides of the political spectrum. Its prominent backers and activists included leftists such as Nicolae L. Lupu and Ion D. Isac, independents such as Pantelimon Erhan, Stefan Frecôt, Dumitru Pavelescu-Dimo, George Tutoveanu and Eraclie Sterian, and some affiliates of the interwar far-right. It also formed a unified cacus with Jean Th. Florescu's Omul Liber faction and with Simion Mândrescu's National-Radicals. The LCC channeled protest votes, and seemed to have gained sweeping popular support during the first year of its existence. It competed in this with fascist movements such as the Iron Guard, ambiguously supporting economic antisemitism—while being generally welcoming of ethnic minorities other than Jewish.

Although perceived as an upsetting contender, the LCC effectively seconded two small agrarian groups, the Peasants' Party–Lupu and the Democratic Peasants' Party–Stere. Under their auspices, it managed to obtain one seat in the Assembly in the election of June 1931. It originally formed part of the opposition to the government formed by Nicolae Iorga, and was treated with noted harshness by Constantin Argetoianu of Internal Affairs. The authorities viewed it as a front for the illegal Romanian Communist Party; communists rejected that claim in the 1930s, but some later came to agree with it. One of the LCC arrested for sedition, Aristică Magherescu, left the group to establish his own Ploughmen's Party of Greater Romania, alongside fellow defector Constantin Iarca.

The League's fiscal proposals were slowly embraced by Iorga and Argetoianu, who also drew former LCC cadres into their government team. While other LCC activists left the League to openly embrace fascism, Antonescu was unofficially backed by Iorga in their shared cause against the Iron Guard. Though involved in supporting continued debt relief policies, the League took no seat in the elections of July 1932, by which time it had split into three rival wings, respectively led by Antonescu, Isac, and Iarca. All groups found themselves opposed to the more orthodox economic policies advanced by Iorga's replacement, Alexandru Vaida-Voevod, and some engaged in street battles with the Romanian Police. In late 1932, shortly after attempting to form a larger Front for Urban Debt-clearance, the LCC finally dissolved itself, with the mainstream joining Argetoianu's own Agrarian Union Party. Other groups still reclaimed the title into the mid-1930s, by which time Antonescu was returning to politics with another protest movement, called Guard for the Defense of Private Property. Magherescu sought to revive the LCC one final time in 1944, before allowing it to be absorbed by the far-leftist Ploughmen's Front.

== History ==
=== Creation ===
The LCC was created by the jurist Emanuel "Nolică" Antonescu with support from various politicians and journalists. Its constitutive congress was held at Antonescu's home in Bucharest on Saturday, August 17, 1929. According to one account, the movement may have had roots that predated the Great Depression: a League of the same name (later LCC chapter) was reportedly formed in 1928 by the Gorj County landowner Alexandru A. Magherescu. Voted in as LCC president, Antonescu had first stirred controversy in 1918, when he acted as a prosecutor selectively investigating wartime abuse. His career in politics saw him crossing the floor: he had been a member of the Conservative and National Parties, and afterwards defected to the National Liberal Party (PNL). Elected for the Senate seat in Gorj, he had criticized the governing National Peasants' Party (PNȚ) for its handling of the Depression, and also for its passage of multiple and conflicting laws.

By December 10, 1929, when it held its first meeting in Bucharest and agreed to petition government, the League counted on the allegiances of various other activists—including George D. Creangă, C. Filotti, Constantin C. Iarca, C. Saligny, and Marin Stănoiu. The LCC's generic goal was the fight against "usury", structured into three lesser objectives: phasing out interest rates, canceling foreclosures, and auditing the "usurers". In one of it manifestos, the LCC demanded quick state intervention and the reevaluation of interest at 1%; according to the peasants' own claims, interest rates could climb as high as 40% or even 100% in 1930. That year, Antonescu sent out a public notification to the Romanian Regents, who were looking after King Michael I. The text, which later became the LCC's producerist platform, spoke of bankers, civil administrators, and industrialists as "parasites", and called for tax cuts on the less wealthy. A peasant militant from Dolj detailed that agenda and proposed measures against the state apparatus, noting that a functionary could earn as much as 50 agricultural workers.

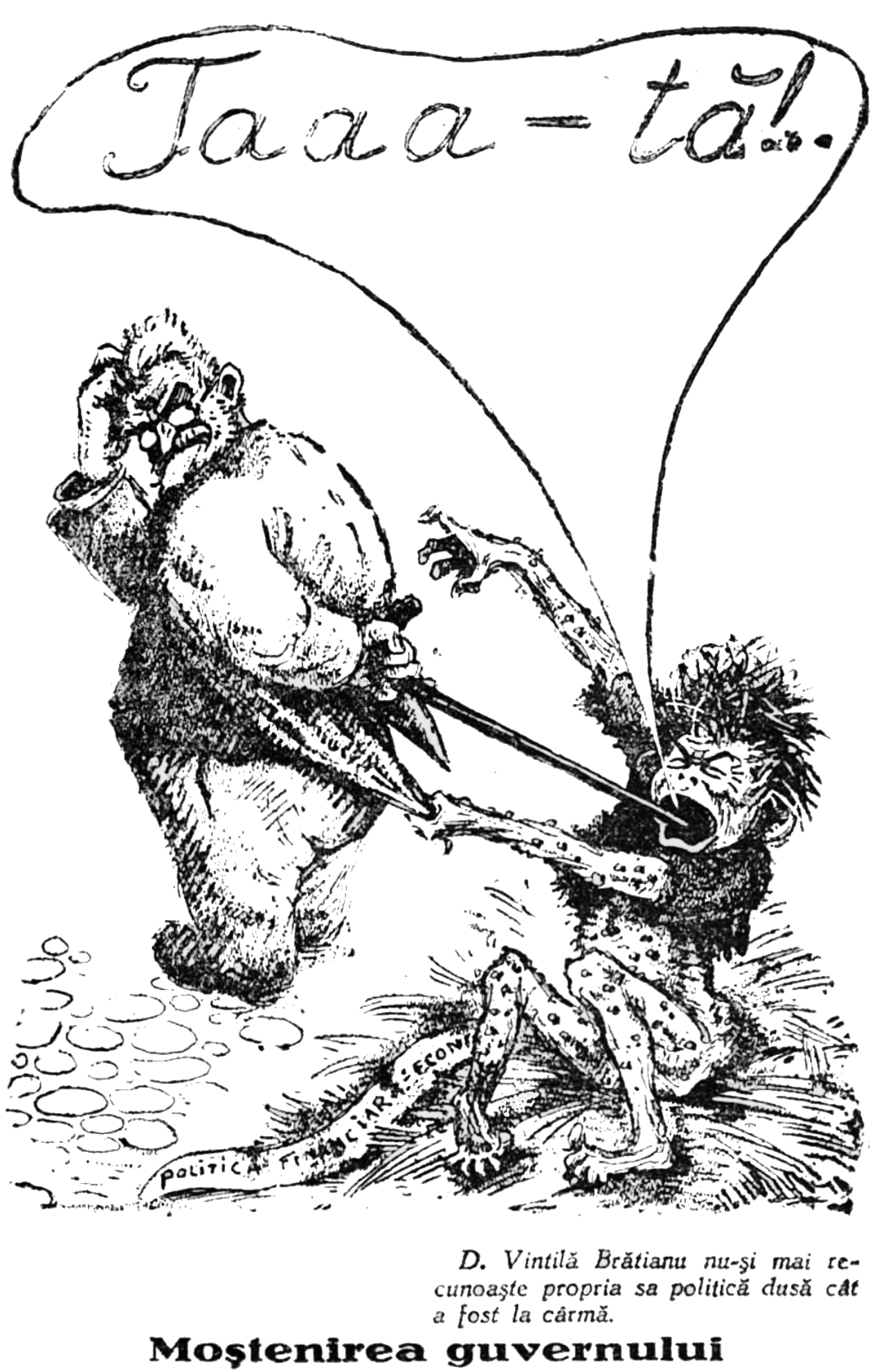
Editorial cartoon published in December 1928 by the National Peasants' Party organ, Dreptatea: Vintilă Brătianu, former Prime Minister for the National Liberal Party, tying to chase away his progeny, a diseased and naked figure marked "Political Financial Economic [Crisis]", who insists on calling him "Father"

Historian Armin Heinen explains the economic mechanism leading to the establishment of the LCC as follows:

The agrarian reform of 1917–1921 created a need for currency, which could only be supplied by bank loans. Agriculturists had contracted high-interest loans, either to compensate the former landowner or to furnish their new or extended property with basic supplies, or merely—given the entirely too small plots they were left for production—to ensure their living income. As an effect of the economic crisis, produce prices fell [...]. The peasants could no longer make their payments, and consequently their properties were put up for sale.

These issues were aggravated by Western protectionism, which prevented exports, and by Soviet predatory pricing, which reduced demand. As early as 1924, Stănoiu, who owned property in Craiova, was accusing the PNL government of deliberately destroying purchasing power and fostering monetary instability, both of which ensured that Romanian capital was being lost, while foreign capital remained out of reach. The Antonescu program, which argued that the conditions of capitalism had fundamentally changed, and that usury had come to interfere with all forms of production and investments, was met with skepticism by various other specialists. A laissez-faire economist, Al. D. Neagu, argued that the League presented "inefficient, unjust and momentary palliatives" to a systemic crisis, none of which could reactivate demand. Neagu also notes that the LCC's claims about usurers were largely dealt with by laws which limited repossession, and that its program was "economically and morally unjustified". Jurist Nicolae Dașcovici also suggested that measures such as those endorsed "by the League against Usury agitators" meant "a continuous and quickened fall of trust by the capital [market]—and as such implicitly the worsening of credit ratings." The "one cure", he proposed, was "liquidating the insolvent".

=== Growth and eclecticism ===
Within months of its creation, the League enjoyed massive growth: on March 1, 1930, it reportedly mustered some 100,000 peasants for a demonstration in Bârlad, with Romanian Army units being called upon to prevent strife. While increasing in numbers, the LCC endured as a complex and eclectic movement. The left-wing journalist Petre Pandrea, who attended LCC meetings, saw the party as a "provisional alliance" of "the kulak and the hired hand". Its sympathizers included Nicolae L. Lupu, leader of the Peasants' Party–Lupu (PȚ–L) and a left-wing critic of National Peasantist economic policies. According to historian Pompiliu Tudoran, both Lupu and Antonescu's parties should be regarded as "center-left". Lupu played a noted part in setting up the League, but was not present for its constitutive congress, being held up by partial elections in Hunedoara County. Attending the subsequent rally in December 1929, he explained that he did so "not as a politician, but as a defender of the debtors"; he also proposed translating the German Civil Code's Article 138 into Romanian laws. According to Pandrea, Lupu had created around him a "popular myth" as a savior, but had never promised his peasant constituents any concrete form of debt relief.

Lupu's faction within the LCC was represented by Ion D. Isac. An educationist and decorated veteran, Isac was both the organizer of the League's branch in Gorj and chair of the national secretariat. Also joining the LCC in 1929 was a politically independent poet, George Tutoveanu, who published denunciations of the bankers and stated that his party's mission was "to fight against suffering." In May 1930, the LCC inaugurated in Bucharest its own political newspaper, Jos Camăta ("Down with Usury"). From November 14, it had Iarca as its editor. In late September, a "National-Radical Party", chaired by Simion Mândrescu, adhered to the LCC platform. From October, the LCC had a chapter in Bessarabia, supervised by Pantelimon Erhan and later joined by Dumitru Iov, who became its vice president. Elsewhere, the League also won the adherence of Sterie Ionescu, who founded in Caracal the newspaper Desrobirea ("Emancipation"), "at the service of plowmen, traders, and the League against Usury". On November 3, 1930, the LCC had absorbed into it ranks Eraclie Sterian's Association of Mortgaged Owners and Debtors. By 1931, it had a branch in Năsăud County, with the mechanic Mihai Buta as one of its prominent members.

With its specific attacks on Jewish creditors, the LCC also had radical-right tinges: Heinen sees it as an "antisemitic and markedly right-wing" party, or "protest movement". The LCC's branch in Bukovina included a Colonel Ioan Niculcea, who also sympathized with the National-Christian Defense League (LANC). In summer 1930, the latter movement had instigated "agrarian troubles of an antisemitic character", with Niculcea as an active instigator. In mid-1930, Niculcea was arrested alongside the LANC's Nichifor Robu and Dumitru Scriculeac, a measure which only resulted in more confrontations between their supporters and Romanian Police. However, upon forming the LCC chapter in Bacău during late July, I. Cristian declared that the movement "does not have an antisemitic character", being open to enemies of usury "no matter what religion or ethnic origin they may have." As noted at the time by La Revue Slave, the LCC also challenged the core antisemitic tenets, by showing publicly that the "usurers" were highly active in Oltenia, where Jews were virtually non-present. In that region, the LCC was especially focused on denouncing the PNL's banking monopoly. Eventually, in 1931, a LANC newspaper warned voters that the League was a "wolf in sheep's clothing", and merely a front for Lupu's party.

In other contexts, the LCC was regarded as a quasi-socialist movement or a front for the banned Romanian Communist Party (PCdR). In one report of January 1931, Argeș County authorities denounced the LCC as a front for both the PCdR and the Social Democratic Party (PSDR). As Pandrea notes, Lupu was suspected of being a "Bolshevik" by the banking lobby, but was merely a Romanian "Kerensky", his policies ones of compromise with the lenders. At a January 1930 LCC rally in Galați, Lupu discussed Romania being "surrounded by enemies", and detailed his explicitly anti-Soviet position. He demanded an increase in military spending, noting that "the Soviets have over 3,000 airplanes and 40 toxic gas factories", with which they had intimidated the Republic of China. Claims of collaboration with the LCC were dismissed by both socialists and communists. In its manifestos, the PSDR, which sided with the PNȚ, wrote off the League and the PȚ–L as opportunistic movements, "created for the love of pork barrels". A more radical position was taken by the PCdR, whose 1931 congress listed LLC among the "fascist and semi-fascist" organisations used by the bourgeoisie and landowners in order to channel the discontent of the masses.

Despite being joined by antisemites, the LCC was also open to members of various ethnic minorities. Its regional chapter in the Banat was led by Stefan Frecôt, a dissident and French-speaking member of the Danube Swabian community, who was also briefly the national LCC's Vice President. In Bukovina, where the LCC formed itself under the presidency of Dorimedont "Dori" Popovici from May 1930, its affiliates included non-Romanians such as Carol Weltman, Victor Orobko, and Rudolf Müller. In September of that year, Popovici himself left the enterprise, accusing Antonescu of using the LCC to further personal ambitions; he won over the Association of Mortgaged Debtors, being elected as its chairman, and considered forming a nation-wide Federation of Taxpayers. In February 1931, worker András Bencze and three other Székelys of Lueta joined the LCC chapter in Rupea—a move which reportedly led them to be persecuted by the Romanian Gendarmes. Ukrainian peasants were noted participants in Niculcea's anti-Jewish riot at Seletin.

=== 1931 election and inner divisions ===
The League acknowledged Carol II's return to the Romanian throne, and "appealed to the sovereign that he take debtors under his protection." By January 1931, from their shared headquarters at Batiștei Street 17, the League and the Association of Mortgaged Debtors had inaugurated a large-scale awareness campaign. On January 8, Alexandru S. Zisu presided over the LCC public gathering in Bucharest, where he asked that the monarchy intervene to prevent the PNȚ government from acting on behalf of creditors; a Teleorman delegate, Mavrodineanu, singled out ministers for indulging in luxuries at the taxpayers' expense, and for allowing "profiteering by the industrial cartels, thanks to whom we consume sugar at 42 lei per kilogram." Also then, Iarca announced that a peasant congress was being prepared. In March, the League and Association were at agricultural shows. These offered venues for airing LCC slogans, including: Dobânda este un furt ce nu trebuie plătit ("Interest is theft that we should not cover").

Carol toppled the National Peasantist cabinet in April, assigning Nicolae Iorga as his Prime Minister. As the latter noted, the appointment coincided with great turmoil, during which the LCC was preparing "an actual peasants' revolt" at Gorj. The possibility of revolts was also raised by Pandrea, who recalled the "1907 atmosphere" and "pre-revolutionary" feel of the LCC congress in Craiova. According to journalist Calman Blumenfeld-Scrutator, the "extraordinarily energetic" League was also especially strong in the Banat, where it looked like a real threat to the establishment. In the June 1931 general elections, convened by Iorga, the LCC ran under a sun cross logo (⊕). It coalesced into a bloc with the PȚ–L, activated by the LCC congress on May 3. This alliance, described by Antonescu as the only moral choice, was disliked by other League sections—the LCC chapter in Dâmbovița County decided to form separate lists. While delegates objected to Lupu's overtures toward Iorga's Democratic Nationalist Party (PND), Antonescu informed them that the LCC leadership was considering joining in that pro-government alliance. The opposition newspaper Lupta reports that, later in May, there was a direct rapprochement between the PND and the League: "All it took for this League to be engaged in negotiations was for Mr Em. Antonescu to address Mr Iorga a flattering letter." Talks continued even though the PND press reassured its readers that "measures of authority" would still be used against anyone encouraging peasants not to honor their debts. That month, Gorj's county prosecutor sought and obtained that Alexandru Magherescu (who was its best-placed candidate) and Aristide "Aristică" Magherescu be arrested and investigated their role in fomenting disorder.

The LCC eventually formed a loose alliance with both the PȚ–L and the left-wing agrarian Democratic Peasants' Party–Stere (PȚD–S). The latter registered on separate lists, but only put up candidates in Bessarabia. In parallel, Antonescu renewed his pact with the National-Radicals, allowing Mândrescu to run in the elections as a League man. In Bucharest, a similar pact was signed with Jean Th. Florescu and his political club Omul Liber (or "Liberal-Democratic Party"), with Florescu granted the top position for Ilfov County. By then, some members of the far-right wing had left the League: Col. Niculcea set up a Beetroot Cultivators' Collective (Obștea Cultivatorilor de Sfeclă), which caucused with the fascist Iron Guard. Far-right groups were nominally repressed during the election, with both Niculicea and Robu returning to jail, but Internal Affairs, then under Constantin Argetoianu, failed to take significant action on that front. At the time, the bulk of its surveillance activity was still focused on the LCC, the PCdR, and the Peasant Workers' Bloc. A left-wing daily, Dimineața, commented on May 28 that:

When it comes [suppression of the communists], we rarely hear anything. In truth and fact, they never truly mattered. [...] This leaves the far-right extremists and the League Against Usury. Savage persecution has been unleashed against the latter, everywhere one looks. The far-right extremists, on the other hand, are free to operate.

According to Scrutator, the LCC policy of presenting peasants as candidates "gives insomnia to the leaders of government organizations, as well as to those in the opposition." In the areas of Transylvania, Crișana, and the Banat, the LCC had its greatest score in Arad County, where it took eighth place with 2,442 votes, ahead of the LANC. As noted by historian Niculae Petrescu, the Democratic Peasantists had more to gain from their partnership with the LCC, increasing their share of the vote nationally. However, only 2.8% of the Romanian voters favored the alliance, winning it six seats in the Assembly of Deputies. The LCC took one seat and the PȚD–S took five. The party's national cartel with the PȚ–L granted it as a favor an extra seat, representing Gorj. Here, the two groups had gathered 3,940 votes between them. The courtesy seat went to Isac, who had been arrested for sedition during the campaign, forcing the authorities to release him.

The PND and its allies emerged victorious from the campaign, returning Iorga as Prime Minister. During the race, Iorga supporter Iosif Trifa had warned peasant voters: "The League Against Usury is a party that puts out promises about debt erasure. May we be allowed to worry that many of its own members are usurers. It is not to be seen as a serious party." In July 1931, Antonescu was consolidating the movement, establishing its official newspaper. Eponymously called Liga Contra Cametei, it was managed by Isac (who was also voted in as general secretary of the League, seconding Antonescu). By September, the LCC was effectively split between two rival groups, respectively led by Antonescu and Iarca. The Gorj section was itself split, with some backing Isac against the Magherescu family. The Isac group sought to assert itself with a major rally in Târgu Jiu, but Argetoianu issued orders to ban any such demonstrations; Isac was however received by Gorj's prefect, Miron Constantinescu, who expressed sympathy for the cause.

Iorga's new administration incorporated former LCC cadres, appointing Tutoveanu as the prefect of Tutova County. By February 1932, Stănoiu was a PND deputy. Though he had sold his property and its debt, he still supported the LCC platform on the issue, as well as a temporary ban on foreclosures—while also asking that banks which held agricultural land as a collateral be refinanced by the state. Around that time, Minister Argetoianu had embraced the slogan of debt relief, and Antonescu was asked to represent the LCC on a government-appointed "conversion committee". This made a good impression on the LCC and its allies. On February 10, some 100 members of the Bucharest chapter, instigated by lawyer Vasile Popescu, left the LCC headquarters on Batiștei Street and staged a thank-you ceremony in front of Argetoianu's house on Victor Emanuel Street. They were joined there by Dori Popovici, who was by then leading his own Association of Mortgaged Owners.

=== Decline and dissolution ===
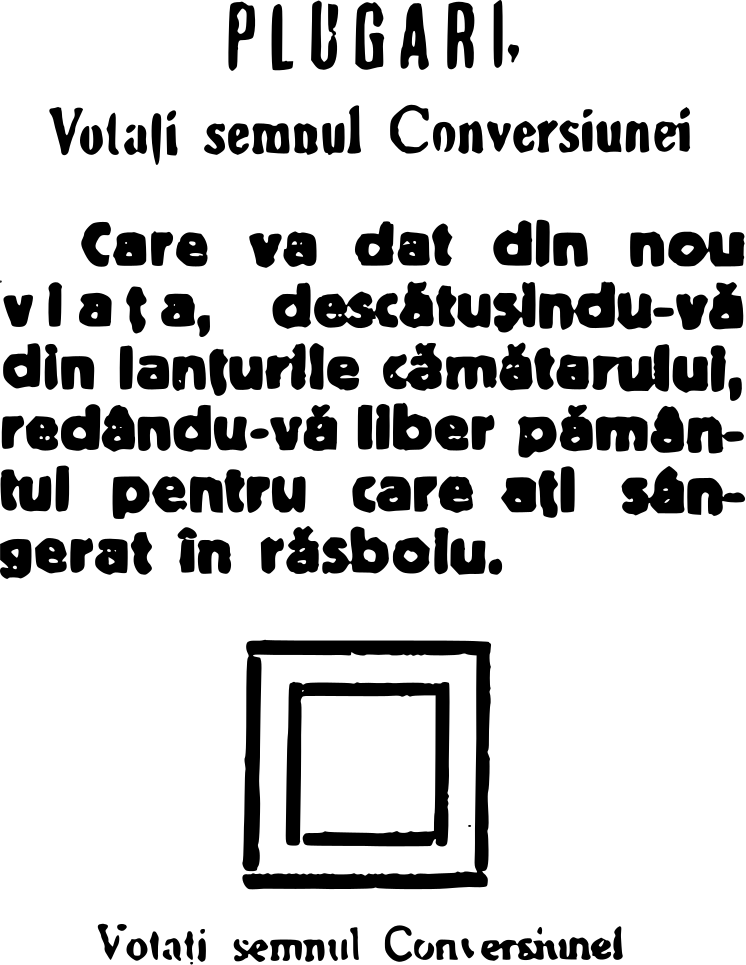
Democratic Nationalist poster for the elections of 1932, reminding plowmen to vote for "the symbol of [debt] Conversion", which had freed them from the "usurer's bondage"

Other splinter groups, formed in the wake of the 1931 elections, included the Ploughmen's Party of Greater Romania (PPRM), established in November 1931 by Iarca, Aristică Magherescu, and Sterie Ionescu. In February 1932, Iarca, as the PPRM chairman, was asking the Electoral Commission for the sun cross logo, to be used as its own symbol. The Commission, which was then under Lupu's leadership, denied them this privilege. The LCC still ran in the partial elections for the Assembly seat in Tutova (April 1932), separate from Lupu's own PȚ–L. During a PNȚ rally held at Bârlad's French Cinema, Eduard Mirto sought to persuade voters that the LCC was "all empty talk, with no possibility of being realized." The seat was taken by the Iron Guard's Corneliu Zelea Codreanu, who won 26% of the vote; the LCC had 13.7%, and the PȚ–L 6.2%. According to Heinen, the League still managed to draw votes away from the Iron Guard's niche, upsetting its growth; a report in Lupta claimed that Antonescu had received full support from Iorga's government, including by having his candidates taken on trips around the county with a government-owned automobile, carrying the Romanian tricolor.

On March 26, 1932, the Assembly voted 248 to 17 in favor of debt relief; all but one of the nays were from Grigore Filipescu's Vlad Țepeș League. The LCC opted to present its own candidates in the elections of July 1932. Already in May, it stirred controversy with posters showing "bloodsucking banks" and "inviting debtors to storm into those financial institutions that have dared to charge over 18% in interest." In mid-June, the cartel it had formed with the PȚ–L was still functional: "As such, Mr Nolică Antonescu shall run at the top of the Lupist list for Tutova." The pact was eventually denounced, allegedly because Lupu had refused to assign an eligible position in Alba County to Antonescu. On June 18, a general assembly of the LCC was held at the new headquarters on Aleea Alexandru 18, where 25 counties were represented. They deposed Antonescu, replacing him with a seven-man committee—Iarca (reinstated as an LCC member on that occasion), Dumitru Pavelescu-Dimo, and landowner I. Anca held the three eligible position on this body.

As explained by Iarca, the LCC's basis had been outraged by Antonescu's preference for an alliance with Lupu ("although [Lupu] had left our movement in the summer of 1930"), and by his less-than-enthusiastic support for Carol. Iarca also accused Antonescu of lassitude when it came to drafting the electoral lists, and alleged that he had negotiated with Argetoianu a fast-tracked debt forgiveness for some of the League's more well-positioned members. By July, Antonescu was attempting to register his own LCC as the real successor party. His associates in this project included Dorel Dumitrescu and Adam Ionescu, as well as, according to Iarca, "a general currently under arms, who has already clarified that he will be withdrawing, and who is barred from even engaging in politics". It absorbed Florescu's group, presenting Florescu himself as its candidate in Târnava Mare County; it also established an alliance with the Traders' Councils (Sfaturile Negustorești) and with "other economic associations".

Still affiliated with the PPRM in June, Aristică Magherescu went to the PȚD–S a month later, and became its candidate for Gorj. He ran directly against an LCC-and-Traders list headlined by Antonescu, as well as against Isac's own incarnation of the League. The situation was mocked in Calendarul daily, which observed that such factionalism had left the public "entirely bewildered by so many kinds of usury." Calendarul proposed that Gorj could now plausibly serve as the home for a "League of Defense Against the Leagues Against Usury." Shortly before this debacle, Isac had joined the PȚ-L, but, as noted by his political adversaries, he still "convened the villagers as if affiliated with the League Against Usury, without informing them about his new boss."

Isac's electoral flyers claimed the League presidency for himself, noting that Antonescu was in fact a member of the Economic Front, and through it a proxy of the National Peasantists. In such propaganda, the Economic Front was also singled out for being under "the kike Wilhelm Filderman, one of Moldavia's greatest usurers." Isac claimed to have won allegiance from all LCC branches in Oltenia, and used as his symbol the "two circles" (Ⓞ). Lupists acted similarly in Făgăraș County, where they shared the ballot with former LCC men, grouped under Ioan Leon. Antonescu's LCC complained about unfair competition in Târnava Mare, where I. Borcoman similarly presented himself as the League's candidate, aligned with the PȚD–S platform. In the end, the official LCC only registered candidates in two counties, while Antonescu also put himself up for election in Argeș County. His "dismal result" of 716 votes from 44,269 electors was registered by Filipescu as evidence that the LCC threat was always exaggerated.

Except for Isac's mandate (which was nearly invalidated on the spot, due to the polemics surrounding his campaign), none of the groups claiming to speak for the League took any seats. An LCC leadership still met in August 1932, when it presented a new set of political demands to the PNȚ cabinet formed by Alexandru Vaida-Voevod. Late that month, Antonescu, Grigore Fieroiu and Aristică Magherescu were recorded as belonging to the same LCC, which held its congress at Transilvania Hall, Bucharest, and had joined the larger Economic Federation, whose president was Dori Popovici. In early September, after a violent clash with Police outside the Imperial Hotel in Bucharest, several LCC figures, including Iarca and Captain Nicolai Mănescu, were taken into custody. On September 12, the LCC headquarters, now recorded as located on Edgar Quinet Street 9, were sealed off.

By September 25, Antonescu and Pavelescu-Dimo were again working together within a Front for the Defense of Debt Relief (Frontul pentru Apărarea Conversiunii), which insisted on support for agricultural production, as well as for the extension of debt forgiveness to Romania's city-dwellers. Largely rendered ineffectual by the adoption of debt relief and anti-usury legislation under the Iorga cabinet, the League supported the application of such laws once they were placed in peril by Vaida-Voevod. At the time, it was speculated that the LCC would form a "spontaneous" alliance with the PND and other parties. According to oral history, Antonescu once traveled to Râmnicu Vâlcea specifically so that he could meet Grigore Forțu, wishing to form a union between his followers and Forțu's own Citizen Bloc.

== Posterity ==
=== FAU and GAPP ===
On October 8, 1932, the LCC announced that it had joined a "Front for Urban Debt-clearance" (Frontul Asanării Urbane, FAU), alongside the Association of Mortgaged Owners and Debtors (API), and was again petitioning the PNȚ cabinet. The FAU leadership included Antonescu, Pavelescu-Dimo, I. Constantinescu, and N. C. Georgescu. In December, it became apparent that Argetoianu's Agrarian Union Party (PUA) was in the process of absorbing the LCC—their shared platform promised to save capitalism, but also to liquidate private debt. This unification included Alexandru Magherescu and his followers in Gorj, who still regarded themselves as legitimate heirs to the LCC. Some other sections continued to claim the LCC's name and history even beyond that moment. On February 3, 1933, Cuvântul hosted an announcement which ran: "Messrs members of the League Against Usury, mortgage debtors' section, are kindly asked to participate in a consultation to be held today [...]. This consultation will determine what attitude the League should have following Mr Antonescu's resignation as leader." Antonescu's version of events, presented in October, was that he had "abolished the League, since it had attained its goal and since he had no political ambitions for himself." Isac had switched to supporting Vaida-Voevod's cabinet, but, in early 1933, condemned police action against the Grivița strikers, describing the ruling classes as immoral, and workers as their "scapegoat".

In June 1933, with Argetoianu's blessing, Iarca formed a regional section of the Ploughmen's Front (FP) in Romanați County. This left-wing protest movement had been formed out of Transylvania by Petru Groza, and recruited reformed members of the Iron Guard. The other post-LCC factions also maintained their visibility. On August 7, members of the FAU stormed into Ramuri hall, Craiova, to prevent an anti-relief speech by Filipescu. On July 9, 1933, at his home on Sfântul Constantin Street 4, Antonescu had set up another organization, the (allegedly fascist) Guard for the Defense of Private Property (GAPP). This group protested against Vaida's return to insolvency legislation, and advanced the reduction of all debts by 75%; it welcomed in members of all ethnicities and creeds, also allowing them to be simultaneously members of any political party. According to its PNȚ-ist critics, the new party was a tool for Argetoianu's maneuvering, since it only represented the interests of high-end debtors, namely those who had incurred their debts "at the baccarat and roulette tables." By the time of its inaugural congress in September 1933, the GAPP had recruited Frecôt and Sterian, and was receiving visits from PUA delegates. By November, it had signed up to a platform of the Debtors' Movement, formed around Constantin Garoflid.

Around that time, Ion G. Duca, as the National Liberal Prime Minister, signed an order banning the Iron Guard. This prompted Filipescu to remark that the Guard was not in fact worse than "Nolică's leagues, who have been infecting this country for more than three years". The GAPP eventually participated in the December 1933 election as part of Argetoianu's PUA-led alliance. Isac presented himself in that race as a PȚ-L candidate—though the PNL government had him arrested, again on charges of sedition, for having encouraged "class conflict". An association called League Against Usury still existed in 1934 in Bucharest, collaborating with the API and as part of the FAU. They shared a building on Carol Street 62. The rival GAPP was also attested on October 7, 1934, when it held congress at its new headquarters in Dudești (Calea Dudești 85). By February 1936, N. C. Georgescu and Pavelescu-Dimo had joined a General Association of Debtors, which had poet Nicolae Mihăescu-Nigrim as its president.

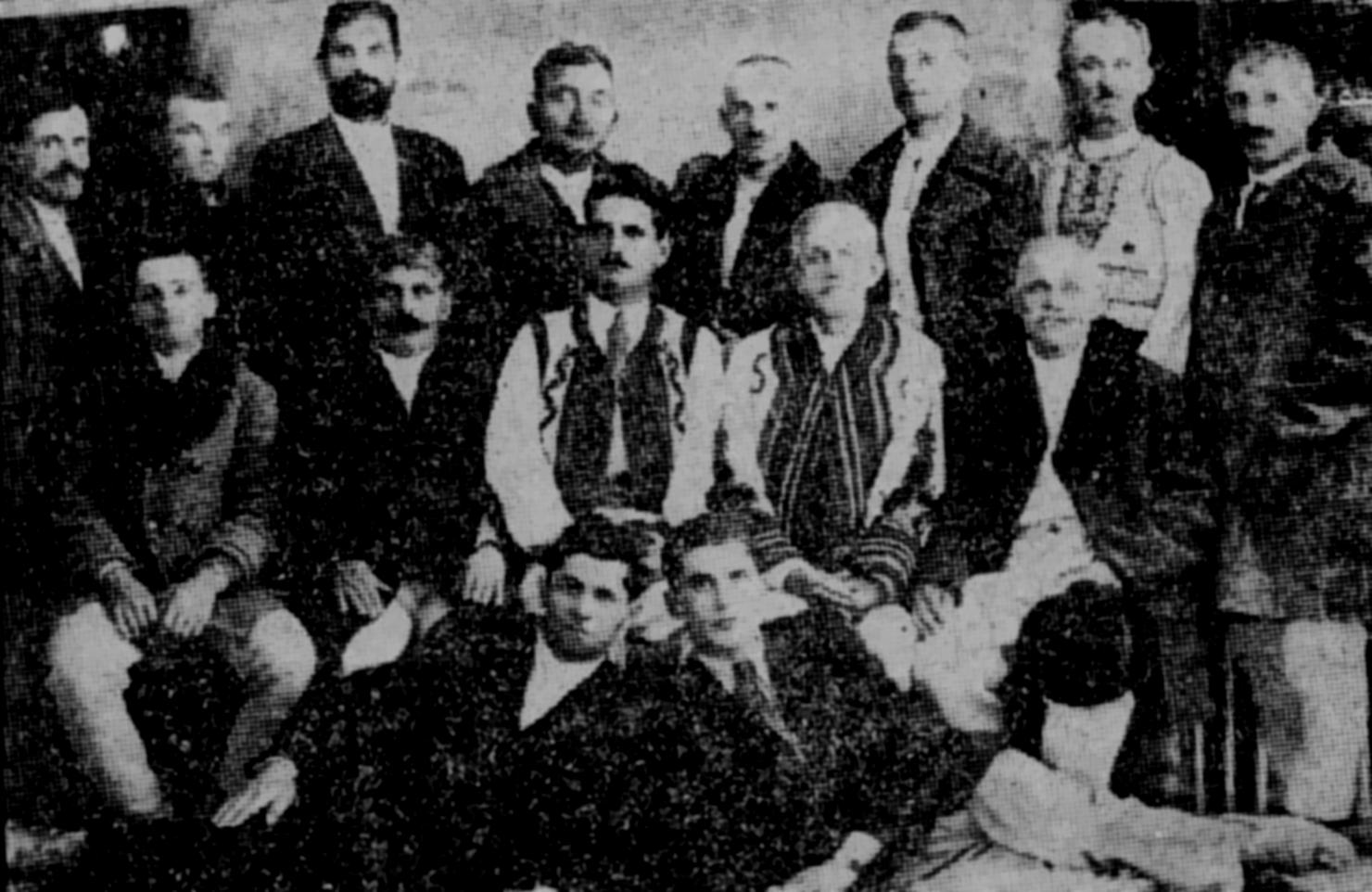
Aristică Magherescu and Gorj peasant debtors, photographed in May 1935

Iarca had reemerged in late 1935 as an organizer of vintagers and vine growers in Buzău County, leading as many as 6,000 in a protest against the spirits monopoly. In May of that year, Aristică Magherescu, as the PUA vice president, organized a rally of the PUA section in Gorj, electing Iarca as that organization's county leader. Sterie Ionescu, meanwhile, founded a Front of Debtors, and, in 1935, sought to reestablish the National Agrarian Party. In 1937, he was publishing the political gazette Buretele, which engaged in a violent polemic with the PNȚ. The latter responded by alleging that Buretele was a front for the PNL government, and by publishing Ionescu's bankruptcy records.

=== Later echoes ===
Before the general election of December 1937, the sun cross logo was taken up by a Radical Peasants' Party, under Grigore Iunian, while Sterie Ionescu registered his Agrarian Party in Târnava Mică County, with himself as a candidate for the Senate of Romania. With the start of World War II, Antonescu reemerged as a right-wing critic of the Iron Guard, whom he accused of fomenting violent dissent among his students. During the Iron Guard ascendancy with the "National Legionary State" of 1940–1941, lawyer Gogu Adam Popescu expressed the hope that insolvency crises would be curbed through stricter credit limits and "honest speculation". Popescu argued at the time that the League was responsible for the "demagogic and capitalist" debt-conversion trend. The Guard's Minister of Agriculture was the wealthy landowner Nicolae Mareș, one of the seventeen deputies to have voted against debt relief in March 1932.

Isac remained in national politics with Lupu's party, also setting up a Ploughmen's Syndicate; he withdrew from public affairs during World War II, but was for a while promoted under the postwar communist regime. In 1946, he was sitting in the Assembly of Deputies, serving as its Vice President; he sided with the National Peasants' Party–Alexandrescu, and produced a denunciation of his schoolteacher colleague, Titu Ciocănescu, as a former Iron Guard propagandist. Lupu himself had rejoined, then left, the PNȚ. Before communism, he presided upon a Democratic Peasants' Party–Lupu, which called itself the left-wing opposition to the PNȚ; in writing the group's manifesto, Lupu described "the law on debt conversion" as one of his own leftist credentials.

In late 1944, Aristică Magherescu had set up a new group called League Against Usury, which had as its twin organization the Ploughmen and Labor Party. On November 30, these were voluntarily absorbed by Groza's FP, which, upon reestablishment, had formed a tight alliance with the communists. Magherescu was made the Front's regional secretary, and in April 1945 hosted the Agriculture Minister, Romulus Zăroni, at his house in Drăgoieni. At a party rally in September 1945, he declared that the FP was a spiritual successor to the LCC, and celebrated the extensive land reform, enacted by the communists, as a fulfillment of peasant demands. During the final years of the pre-communist interlude, Magherescu himself became more right-wing. In 1947, he was listed as belonging to Argetoianu's National Union for Work and Reconstruction, becoming chairman of its Gorj chapter in August.

During the early stages of communism, the LCC continued to be regarded as an opportunistic movement, and was characterized as such in a 1961 essay by party historian Titu Georgescu. Other stances were taken up later in the 1960s by researchers such as Gheorghe Ioniță, who reclaimed the League as one of the "democratic organizations created, steered, and influenced by the [communist party]". Authors C. and F. Dumitrescu reached a similar conclusion, namely that the PCdR had had a "tight connection" with the League. In 1975, researcher Amuliu Cheța similarly placed the LCC among the "progressive mass organizations led or influenced by the communists". In a 1989 article discussing the peasantry as a revolutionary force, Ion Popescu-Puțuri listed the LCC, alongside the Ploughmen's Front and the Socialist Peasants' Party, as one of the communist party's "legal mass organizations".

== Electoral history ==
=== Legislative elections ===
Election	Votes	Percentage	Chamber	Senate	Position
1931	80,570	2.8	1 / 387	0 / 113	9th
1932		under 0.2	0 / 387	0 / 113	
