= Eraclie Sterian =

Romanian physician, writer and political activist (1872 - 1948)

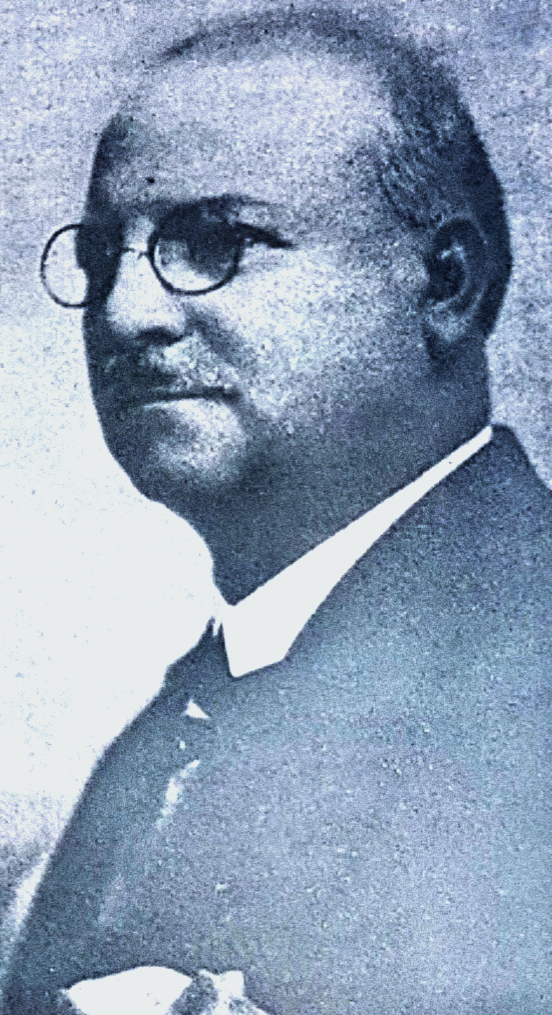
- Sterian in 1908
- Born: November 23, 1872; Galați, Principality of Romania
- Died: January 21, 1948 (aged 75)
- Scientific career
- Fields: Pathology; Sexology; Hydrotherapy; Social medicine; Social hygiene
- Institutions: Brâncovenesc Hospital; Bucharest Military Hospital; Colțea Hospital; Lariboisière Hospital

Eraclie Sterian (also known as Eracle, Eracli or Iraclie Sterian; November 23, 1872 – January 21, 1948) was a Romanian physician, writer, and political activist, known for introducing sexology and sex education in his country. Trained as a pathologist, he established his reputation as a popularizer of conventional and alternative medicine (primarily hydrotherapy), putting out the influential magazine Medicul Poporului. His early work also dealt with life extension practices and warnings about the effects of pollution. Sterian was a marginal ally of the Symbolist movement, to which his uncle Mircea Demetriade belonged; he had a longstanding friendship with poets Alexandru and Pavel Macedonski. He was a publisher of textbooks and literary works, including Demetriade's "Ali's Dream", and author of dramas. His pro-natalist propaganda play, Tout pour l'enfant, performed at the Théâtre Antoine in 1913.

As a doctor and a social critic, Sterian held unconventional views on eugenics, social hygiene, and the social role of sexual experiences. These caused a lasting scandal for their challenging of ancestral taboos—although, overall, Sterian remained a conservative and an avowed Christian, who claimed to have found a cure for compulsive masturbation. His sex manuals, aimed at a young audience, enjoyed success nationwide, and went through several editions in the 1910s. In parallel, as a disciple of René Quinton, he circulated claims that tuberculosis and its various complications could be successfully treated with seawater. Sterian's interests diversified with time, and he produced essays challenging scientific orthodoxy on topics such as human evolution and Indo-European studies. Also an advocate of Romanian nationalism, he rallied with the Conservative Party, before defecting to the National Liberals in 1914.

A Colonel in the Romanian Land Forces, Sterian was also an expert of typhus, having taken part in the World War I campaign against epidemics, and managing to survive that disease. Immediately after the war, he reported success in his treatment of gonorrhea-based inflammation, especially conjunctivitis. Sterian's results in this field were supervised by Victor Morax during clinical trials at Lariboisière Hospital, where Sterian worked for some three years in the early 1920s. In old age, at the height of the Great Depression, he focused on defending his status as a property owner in Bucharest, founding an Association of Mortgaged Owners and Debtors. He followed Jean Th. Florescu's schism from the National Liberal Party, afterwards joining the nationwide League Against Usury. Upon the latter's disestablishment, Sterian joined a Guard for the Defense of Private Property, then a Taxpayers' Syndicate. He was survived by his son, the writer-politician Paul Sterian, and by his daughter-in-law, painter Margareta Sterian; his granddaughter was actress Raluca Sterian.

== Biography ==
=== Early activities ===
Born in the port city of Galați, in what was then the Principality of Romania, Eraclie Sterian was the son of Dimitrie and Maria. Both parents were natives of Craiova, and participated in the Romanian War of Independence: Dimitrie as an officer in combat, Maria as a field nurse. His maternal uncle may have been the pioneering microbiologist Constantin Levaditi; on his paternal side, Eraclie was the nephew of actors Aristide Demetriade and Aristizza Romanescu, and of poet Mircea Demetriade. Some of Eraclie's political adversaries implied that he was of Greek ethnicity, a "genuine Romanian out of Athens". The Sterians were also widely thought of as Jewish, and, more specifically, Eraclie was rumored to have been baptized a Christian from Judaism. The family rejected such claims.

During the early years of the Romanian Kingdom, Eraclie left Galați and moved with his family to Craiova, where he would later graduate from Carol I National College, in the same class as mathematician Gheorghe Țițeica. From 1891 to 1897, he took courses at the University of Bucharest medical school, and then was an intern at Brâncovenesc Hospital. As a member of the Medical Students' Society from 1892, he gave lectures on the treatment of gonorrhea and the state of physician–patient privilege. In May 1897, he became a Doctor of Medicine with a thesis on aspergillosis, following up with papers on malaria (1899) and tuberculosis transmission (1902); he also edited for print I. T. Thomescu's courses on pathology and internal medicine, and lectured at the Romanian Atheneum on the prevention of gout. Settling in Bucharest, where he briefly put out the magazine Spitalul ("The Hospital"), Sterian married Alexandrina Gulimănescu, daughter of a florist from Pitești. Together, they had four children, including sons Paul (born 1904) and Constantin. Their home by 1912 was on Bibescu-Vodă Street, 22.

In parallel to his work in conventional medicine, Sterian was becoming a follower of Sebastian Kneipp's water cures. He published his own introduction on the subject, including a biography of Kneipp, in 1904. In 1903, he relaunched his work in medical journalism with a review called Tribuna Sănătăței ("Health Tribune"), and then involved himself in public debates over the medical implications of wearing corsets. By late 1904, he was arguing, against Dimitrie Gerota, that corsets were not harmful in themselves. From November 1, 1905, to May 7, 1911, Sterian put out a weekly magazine, first as Medicina Populară ("Popular Medicine"), then as Medicul Poporului ("People's Physician"). He began writing occasional articles for Familia, including a 1906 piece on life extension, advertising iodine-based cures.

By 1905, Sterian and his Demetriade uncle had joined the circle of Symbolist writers and connoisseurs formed around Alexandru Macedonski. Sterian also joined the Conservative League, a pressure group within the nationwide Conservative Party. In June 1905, ahead of scheduled elections in Bucharest, he hosted Macedonski and "over 150 electors" in his home. Speaking on this occasion, he urged all members of the League not to rebel against the party leadership. Sterian's various opinion pieces were published under pseudonyms: Ester (in Macedonski's Liga Conservatoare), Est, and Ilcare. Also in 1905, Sterian had become a grassroots organizer of the Conservatives. He was active in the Blue Ward of Bucharest, alongside Demetriade; in February 1906, they both issued a call for reunification between the Conservative mainstream and the Junimea splinter group, noting that the latter has absorbed some of the most talented cadres (including Petre P. Carp and Alexandru Marghiloman).

A year later, Sterian conferenced at the Atheneum on a highly controversial topic, declaring himself opposed to the immigration of Romanians from Austria-Hungary, and especially Transylvania. In his view, the Transylvanians were an invasive and pervasive presence, whose influence risked subjugating the culture of other Romanian subgroups. This stance was mocked by intellectuals who had embraced Romanian nationalism and anti-Symbolist traditionalism. In a March 1907 satire, George Ranetti proposed that Sterian's quarrel with the Transylvanians was inspired by Macedonski—since immigrants from that region were least likely to embrace, or even condone, the "decadent" school. In his other political stances, Sterian's outlook was that of a compliant nationalist. During the Bosnian crisis of 1908, he addressed the crowds at Dacia Hall to protest against Austria-Hungary and the Triple Alliance; in that context, he called for the Duchy of Bukovina to be annexed by Romania.

In a March 1910 article for Medicul Poporului, Sterian challenged American eugenicists and their policy of compulsory sterilization, as well as orthodox degeneration theory. In his view, sterilization could provide some form of racial hygiene, but could do nothing to curb crime, mental disease, or alcoholism. Around that time, as concerned members of the Romanian Orthodox Church, Sterian and Demetriade joined the movement supporting Gherasim Safirin, the Bishop of Roman, in his conflict with the secularizing Romanian Synod. Sterian publicly referred to the Synod as manipulated by "atheists" and "grave sinners". His wife Alexandrina soon became a major patron of Saint Catherine Church, Bucharest.

=== Sexology and natalism ===
Sterian's popularization of health subjects earned him a following among the youth and working-class readers. This is attested by writer Panait Istrati, who grew up reading Medicina Populară. In 1908, Sterian published his best-seller, Educația sexelor ("Sex Education"). It had another edition published that same year, and three more, including a French translation, before 1915. It was complemented by a sex manual, În noaptea nunții ("On Your Wedding Night"), published in two editions in 1909. Popular with the regular public, such works were found unpalatable by Christian critics, who objected in particular to Sterian's claim that sexual refinement was one of "the holy ancestral values". The Greek-Catholic intellectual Teofil A. Bălibanu, who read Educația sexelor in high school, called it "a diabolic work", alleging that "tens of thousands of young men and women" had been driven astray by Sterian. Doctor Ștefan Irimescu dismissed Sterian as a profiteer, noting that the sexology books, rich in "tiny disgusting details", "excite the morbid curiosity of his various readers". Nevertheless, the books took a conservative view on issues such as masturbation. Sterian believed that recluse male youth were driven into compulsive self-stimulation by "lack of exercise, lack of fresh air, [and by] reading sensual stories and novels", as well as by oxalic acid as found in chocolate. Sterian thought that chronic male masturbators could be recognized by their "pervasive scent of sperm", and also by mannerisms, such as laughing for no apparent reason. He also claimed to have cured thousands of "ephebes" with iodine syrup and injections of cacodylic acid. He used similar treatments for impotence, where he also recommended electroconvulsive therapy.

Sterian's range of interests extended over those years. His topical brochures dealt with life extension treatments, as well as with balneotherapy (at Băile Govora and on the Black Sea Littoral). From 1906, he had been applying René Quinton's theories, injecting dogs with a seawater-and-peptone water mixture, as a method of blood transfusion. His proposal that baths could cure tuberculosis was detailed in another 1908 pamphlet, Omul oceanic ("The Oceanic Man"). Also that year, he attended a congress of thalassotherapy in Opatija. First stated in 1908, his claim that, following Quinton, he could cure tuberculosis with seawater injections was met with indignation by the medical establishment. A French doctor, Charles Mongour, tried to replicate Quinton's results, and observed that the death rate neared 100%. Sterian objected, arguing that Quinton (and therefore Mongour) had failed to sterilize the water before use. Irimescu, as head physician of Filaret Hospital, called Sterian "illiterate", and suggested that Medicul Poporului was "intoxicating the public" with "repugnant" information.

Sterian was present for the massive Conservative and Conservative-Democratic rally of April 1910, which openly challenged political domination by the National Liberal Party (PNL), and allegedly included calls to violence against its leaders. However, just weeks after the 1911 legislative election, which gave the Conservatives (reunited with Junimea) a majority in Parliament, Sterian led the inner-party opposition to the Romanian Premier, Carp. This was covered by the Conservative-Democratic press as a paradox, with Sterian as leader of Praetorians, willing to sacrifice a former favorite. Before the elections of 1912, Sterian was also a public speaker at various other Conservative gatherings. He became noted, and ridiculed, for his urging the populist leader Nicolae Fleva to also join that party. To May 15, 1912, he served in the Conservative-led administration as Comptroller at the Ministry of Commerce. He quit the party in December, stating his indignation that newer recruits had been advanced to positions higher than his. He had rejoined by December 1913, but still took up that complaint in front of his party colleagues at a local congress, and left the room in protest.

Sterian was co-opted as a medical expert by the Romanian Army bulletin, Buletinul Armatei și Marinei, and also wrote for the nationally circulated weekly Săptămâna Politică și Culturală. In 1912, he had joined Victor Anestin's Astronomical Society, later becoming inducted into the Société astronomique de France. In 1913, he edited for print the poem "Ali's Dream", by his uncle Demetriade. His own tragicomedy, Tout pour l'enfant ("All for the Child"), was staged in Paris by Théâtre Antoine. Starring Ève Francis and Allain Dhurtal, it registered significant success during the summer 1913 season. If followed the tribulations of a sterile lady, Jeanne Montrose, who encourages her husband to force himself on the much younger Fernande. The conflict over the resulting child is miraculously resolved when Jeanne agrees to let Fernande replace her as Mrs. Montrose. Emery, the staff critic at Comoedia, gave the play a poor review, calling it a "loony bin". Robert de Flers wrote in Le Figaro:

Dr. Eraclie Stérian—apparently well-known in Romania for his scientific works—has set for himself no less a goal than to provide France with a new means to combat depopulation [...]. But heavens, how could Mr. Stérian imagine that in order to produce children for the French—something not at all easy to do—he should first set himself to produce a play—that which is even more difficult? [...] Mr. Eraclie Stérian has an exceedingly large conception of the family, but he also has only a faint notion of what dramatic art is."

With the 1913 book Cum putem mări cantitatea de vieață și Paradoxele longevității ("How Me May Enhance Life Quantitatively, and The Paradoxes of Longevity"), Sterian produced a more radical critique of degeneration theory, proposing a new take on human evolution. He hypothesized that modern man was an ape species that had suffered adaptation to syphilis, which, in his reading, meant increased intelligence. Although he believed that syphilitic infection was a "civilizing hero", Sterian noted that the modern form of the epidemic needed to be kept in check. The book mainly insisted on solutions for the increase of man's lifespan. During the research phase, Sterian offered free consultations to all of Bucharest's centenarians. His overall conclusion was that, through control of one's effort and cultivation of one's intellect, people could live up to age 124.

=== World War I and LCC ===
During early 1914, Sterian renounced his Conservative membership and joined the PNL, adhering to its Bucharest branch. In summer of that year, which was shortly before the start of World War I, La Presse Médicale published his French-language essay on the supposed medical hazards of asphalt concrete. Sterian argued that, being impossible to sweep clean, asphalt created unhygienic dust, and also warned that asphalt roads had a serious risk of structural collapse. During the following two years, in still-neutral Romania, he returned to his literary work, this time published in Romanian. Tout pour l'enfant was translated as Copilul ("The Child"), and bound together with Sterian's second comedy, O invenție ciudată ("A Strange Invention").

Following Romania's entry into the war, Sterian joined the medical officers' corps of the Second Army, becoming a Major on April 1, 1917, and a Lieutenant Colonel exactly four years later. He carried medical experiments on soldiers with massive hemorrhage, injecting them with seawater. In his overview of the results, he claimed that the injections acted as transfusions, allowing all subjects to be safely operated upon by military surgeons. He claimed that: "Soldiers who were dead—or nearly dead, due to massive blood-loss—came back to life..." During the rapid retreat of late 1916, he followed the troops into Western Moldavia. While in Bacău, he contracted typhus; he had fully recovered in March 1917, having been cared for by a military physician, Colonel Veniamin. Sterian earned distinction with his work in combating the disease, publishing his personal observations in 1918, when other articles of his also saw print in Ionescu-Caion's magazine, Cronicarul. The year also marked his son Paul's debut in literature, at age 14.

Sterian could return to Bucharest before or after the Armistice of November. At the Military Hospital and at Colțea, he experimented with a serum that, according to his own claims, managed to alleviate symptoms of monoarthritis, orchitis, prostatitis, and gonorrhea-sourced "rheumatism"; supervised by Colonel Ilie Constantinescu, he also used this substance in treating ophthalmia caused by infection with Neisseria gonorrhoeae. In March 1919, he had resumed his activity in the PNL, appearing at party gathering organized by Ștefan Sihleanu and Ion G. Duca. He asked the PNL to endorse legislative proposals that would chase out delinquent tenants; this proposal was met with laughter from those in the audience, one of whom exposed Sterian for his practice of hiking rents. Sterian interrupted this activity to focus entirely on his research, and, on October 15, 1920, left for Paris to continue his experiments under Victor Morax's supervision. In early 1921, he was working at Lariboisière Hospital, applying his serum to conjunctivitis brought on by N. gonorrhoeae.

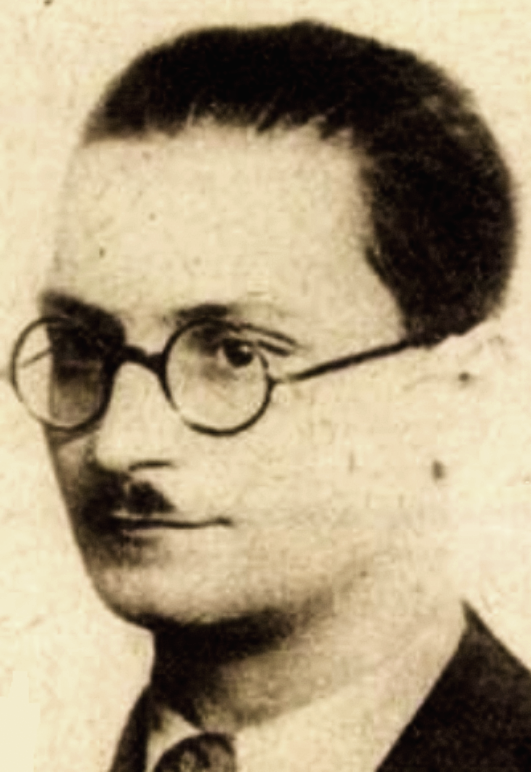
Paul Sterian in 1939

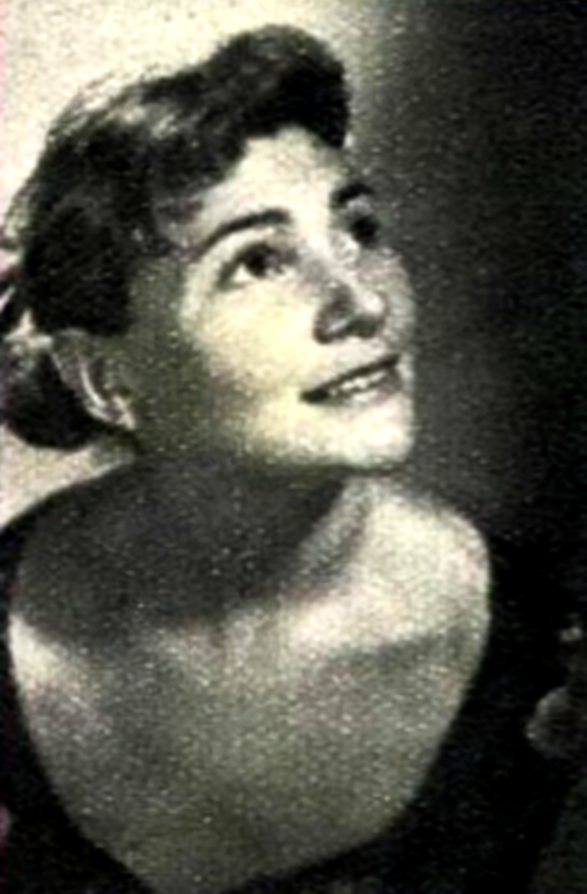
Raluca Sterian in 1958

When Sterian regained Bucharest in mid-1923, it was with assurances that his serum would be mass-produced by the Pasteur Institute. Decommissioned and promoted to reserve Colonel on October 1, 1924, he returned to his native Galați in April 1926 to give a lecture on social medicine and social hygiene—this enterprise was sponsored by the Cultural League for the Unity of All Romanians. In June, he publicly debated with jurist Ioan Gr. Periețeanu over medical malpractice; Sterian was of the opinion that doctors deserved absolute immunity (since such a doctrine would dis-inhibit experimentation), and extolled the continued use of medicine with known side effects, including Salvarsan. Lecturing to a proletarian public in Câmpina during January 1927, he advised them to wean their children off cow's milk, noting its association with Mycobacterium bovis (and therefore with tuberculosis in humans).

Having built himself a townhouse at his old home on Bibescu-Vodă, Sterian joined a protest movement of the Bucharest property-owners, initially aimed at tenants. Addressing one of the group's meetings in September 1923, he argued that tenants of shopping areas needed to pay a rent pegged to their yearly profits. In March 1925, he spoke at the owners' congress, and was mandated to present their grievances against property-tax hikes to Premier Ion I. C. Brătianu. This movement was consolidated as the Property Owners' Syndicate, founded on December 21, 1925, and presided upon by Constantin Tamara. At one of its meetings in October 1927, Sterian proposed that banking institutions be pressured into providing landlords with cheap credit "for any reparation work that their buildings would require." In parallel, he represented an informal union of medical reservists, who petitioned government to grant them higher ranks and pension rights.

Sterian also made a brief return to politics following the Great Depression, when he founded the activist Association of Mortgaged Owners and Debtors. It was especially active during early 1930, when, together with the larger League Against Usury (LCC), it preached anti-capitalist rebellion at agricultural shows. The authorities kept it under watch, viewing it as an outside associate of the outlawed Romanian Communist Party. By May, Sterian had broken with the National Liberals, whom he depicted as corrupt, and had joined Jean Th. Florescu's political club Omul Liber (or "Liberal-Democratic Party"). His own Association finally merged into the LCC in November 1930. Sterian was a minor candidate in the June 1931 general elections, seconding Florescu on the LCC list for Ilfov County. The national group was dissolved by September 1933, when Sterian was recruited by the Guard for the Defense of Private Property, presided upon by former LCC chairman Eftimie Antonescu.

=== Final years ===
In late 1933, Sterian was engaged in a protracted legal battle with the physicians' corps, after refusing to fill out his application under the provision of new laws regulating that profession. He continued with his advocacy for debt relief, engaging Toma Dragu, the politician and creditor, in a public debate over this topic. As Sterian noted in his open letter, carried by Adevărul of March 2, 1934, he had borrowed money in 1927, when the leu was a floating currency, and was forced to pay it back with no adjustment, after monetary stabilization. On July 11 of that year, he participated in the creation of a Taxpayers' Syndicate, being voted in as one of its two vice presidents. Sterian still made returns to medical research, and, in 1935–1936, claimed to have cured Pott disease using seawater ("marine plasma") injections, and also that he had again resurrected dogs through seawater transfusions. In mid-1938, the Romanian press asked him to weigh in on the case of an intersex person, Carol Eschenazi, which "has been preoccupying Romanian public opinion these past days." Sterian advised in favor of sex assignment surgery on pubescent individuals.

Over those years, Paul Sterian had surpassed his father's renown, becoming one of the leading poets of the Gândirea circle, as well as a noted economist, sociologist, and diplomat. He may have joined the fascist Iron Guard at some point in the early-to-mid 1930s and was alleged to be hosting shooting practice for its members on one of Eraclie's properties. Married to artist Margareta Sterian, Paul was later head of legation in Washington, D. C., then, during World War II, a public servant of the Ion Antonescu regime. The regime adopted hard-line antisemitic policies, and Paul Sterian was tasked with auctioning off confiscated Jewish property. The family again had to dismiss public rumors according to which they were Jewish (though Eraclie's son Constantin would go on to marry a baptized Jew, Silvia Sterian).

Also in 1941, Tout pour l'enfant, renamed Leagăn și Amor ("Cradle and Love"), was presented to a review committee of the National Theater Bucharest, chaired by Liviu Rebreanu. The board rejected its production, noting that the play was "not up to the ethical and aesthetic tenets of our country's most important stage". At that late moment in his life, Sterian Sr returned to publishing under the pen name Ave Caesar, with Încercări de etimologie ("Essays in Etymology", 1939–1940). Under his real name, he presented his findings to the Friends of Literary History in late November 1940. According to literary historian Victor Durnea, this contribution was forgettable, "obviously the work of a dilettante, often ridiculous in its claims." By late 1941, he was presenting his claim of having deduced "the origin of every word in any Indo-European language"; he also denied the Slavic influence on Romanian, postulating instead that Slavic languages were deeply influenced by Romanian.

During 1942, Sterian Sr was active as a member of Pavel Macedonski's Romanian Literary Salon. In late 1943, he returned to publishing with an astronomical tract, denying that the Sun is incandescent, and offering his musings on the possibility of extraterrestrial life. It was presented to the Romanian Academy by historian Nicolae Bănescu, on Sterian's own request. On January 24, 1946, he formed a "Romanian Etymological Society", located at his house on Bibescu-Vodă. In May of the following year, Sterian appeared at the Royal Foundations to give an overview of his lifelong pursuit for alternative cures. He restated his belief in seawater injections, and also argued for autotransfusion in the treatment of low back pain, angina, adenitis, boils, and various other afflictions.

Sterian died on January 21, 1948, and was buried two days later at Bellu Cemetery. This was just as Romania was entering a period of communist rule. The new regime marginalized, imprisoned, and ultimately rehabilitated his writer son, and also briefly arrested Constantin Sterian. The latter's daughter was the actress and model Raluca Sterian, who, during her father and uncle's persecution, protected her career by becoming the lover of communist minister Gogu Rădulescu; in 1964, she managed to emigrate to France, where she married a publisher, Jean-Jacques Nathan.
