= Alexander Marmureanu =

American-Romanian academic

Alexander R. Mărmureanu (in Romanian: Alexandru Mărmureanu, born 1962) is a Romanian-born American surgeon and academic.

== Early life and education ==
Marmureanu was born in Băile Govora, Romania. He attended the University of Medicine and Pharmacy of Craiova and graduated with a degree in medicine. He completed his general surgery internship and residency at the New York University School of Medicine and Mount Sinai School of Medicine from 1994 to 2000, serving as chief resident in his final year, and completing a postdoctoral research fellowship at NYU's Institute of Reconstructive Plastic Surgery from 1997 to 1998. As a surgeon, he is specialized in cardiothoracic surgery, and is board certified in both general surgery and thoracic surgery.

== Career ==
Marmureanu moved to the United States in 1990, after the Romanian revolution. After moving to the U.S., he completed his residency and surgical training at New York University and Mount Sinai Medical Center.

From 2000 to 2002, Marmureanu completed a fellowship in cardiothoracic surgery at UCLA Medical Center. From 2002 to 2003, he was a clinical instructor at UCLA Medical Center's cardiothoracic surgery division. He is board-certified by the American Board of Surgery (2002) and the American Board of Thoracic Surgery (2003).

In January 2003, he became the Medical Director of Cardiothoracic Surgery at Century City Medical Center. He later held the same position at Valley Presbyterian Hospital, Cedars-Sinai Medical Center, and California Hospital Medical Center and has held hospital appointments at Cedars-Sinai Marina del Rey Hospital, Providence Saint John's Health Center, and Hollywood Presbyterian Medical Center, among others. He is Director of Cardiothoracic Surgery at Centinela Hospital Medical Center in Inglewood and at Southern California Hospital at Culver City, and since 2023 has been an Assistant Professor of Surgery at the California University of Science and Medicine, where he chaired the school's Bylaws Committee, and currently serves as a Member of the Faculty Executive Council.

Marmureanu is the founder, president, and CEO of the California Heart & Lung Surgery Medical Center.

Marmureanu was selected for Los Angeles Magazine's Top Doctors 2024 and 2026. He was selected for Southern California Super Doctors 2026.

== Selected publications ==
- Crisera CA, Connelly PR, Marmureanu AR, Colen KL, Rose MI, Li M, Longaker MT, Gittes GK. Esophageal atresia with tracheoesophageal fistula: suggested mechanism in faulty organogenesis. Journal of Pediatric Surgery 1999 Jan;34(1):204-8. doi: 10.1016/s0022-3468(99)90258-0. PMID 10022173.
- Crisera CA, Connelly PR, Marmureanu AR, Li M, Rose MI, Longaker MT, Gittes GK. TTF-1 and HNF-3beta in the developing tracheoesophageal fistula: further evidence for the respiratory origin of the distal esophagus'. Journal of Pediatric Surgery 1999 Sep;34(9):1322-6. doi: 10.1016/s0022-3468(99)90003-9. PMID 10507421.
- Wieder JA, Laks H, Freitas D, Marmureanu A, Belldegrun A. Renal cell carcinoma with tumor thrombus extension into the proximal pulmonary artery. The Journal of Urology 2003 Jun;169(6):2296-7. doi: 10.1097/01.ju.0000065432.22782.0d. PMID 12771776.
- Marelli D, Laks H, Patel B, Kermani R, Marmureanu A, Patel J, Kobashigawa J; University of California at Los Angeles Heart Transplant Group. Heart transplantation in patients with diabetes mellitus in the current era. The Journal of Heart and Lung Transplantation 2003 Oct;22(10):1091-7. doi: 10.1016/s1053-2498(02)01219-6. PMID 14550818.
- Vaseghi M, Gima J, Kanaan C, Ajijola OA, Marmureanu A, Mahajan A, Shivkumar K. Cardiac sympathetic denervation in patients with refractory ventricular arrhythmias or electrical storm: intermediate and long-term follow-up. Heart Rhythm 2014 Mar;11(3):360-6. doi: 10.1016/j.hrthm.2013.11.028. Epub 2013 Nov 28. PMID 24291775; PMCID: PMC4253031.
