= Longaker =

Longaker is a surname of Norwegian or Danish origin. Notable people with the surname include:

- Christine Longaker, American pioneer in the hospice movement
- Michael Longaker, American medical researcher and plastic surgeon
- Richard Longaker (1924–2018), American political scientist
