= Treaty of Buftea =

Preliminary peace treaty between Kingdom of Romania and the Central Powers

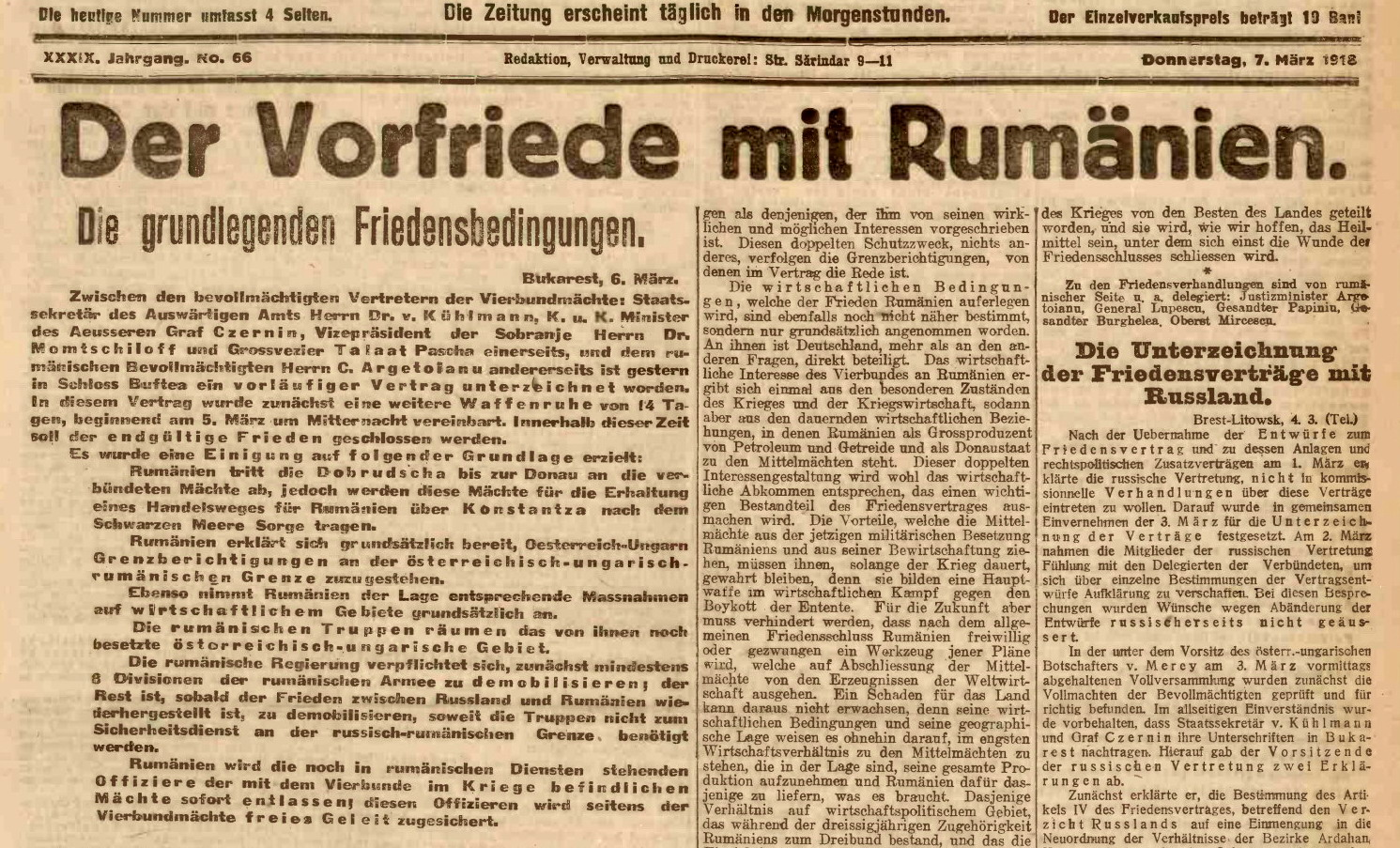
- Bukarester Tagblatt announcing the conclusion of the preliminary peace treaty
- Signed: 5 March [O.S. 20 February] 1918
- Location: Buftea, Kingdom of Romania (under Central Powers' occupation since December 1916)
- Effective: 5 March 1918
- Signatories: (German Empire) Richard von Kühlmann; (Austria-Hungary) Ottokar Czernin; (Ottoman Empire) Talaat Pasha; (Tsardom of Bulgaria (1908–1946)) Nikola Momchilov; (Kingdom of Romania) Constantin Argetoianu
- Parties: German Empire; Austria-Hungary; Ottoman Empire; (Tsardom of Bulgaria (1908–1946)) Bulgaria; (Kingdom of Romania) Romania

The Treaty of Buftea was a preliminary peace treaty between the Kingdom of Romania on one side and the Central Powers on the other.

Following the stalemate on the Romanian front after the campaign of 1917, the October Revolution and Russia's subsequent unilateral exit from World War I (see the Armistice between Russia and the Central Powers), Romania had little choice but to conclude a truce with the Central Powers (see the Armistice of Focșani).

On 27 February [O.S. 14 February] 1918, during the meeting between Ferdinand I of Romania and Ottokar Czernin, the Austro-Hungarian Foreign Minister, at the Răcăciuni railway station, the Central Powers issued an ultimatum to Romania, threatening to denounce the armistice and resume the hostilities in 48 hours. Therefore, King Ferdinand summoned a Crown Council on 2 March [O.S. 17 February] 1918 in Iași, the Romanian capital-in-exile. After long and difficult discussions, which lasted 3 days, and despite the strong opposition of Queen Marie and General Constantin Prezan, the Crown Council decided to accept the ultimatum and send envoys to Buftea to negotiate a preliminary peace treaty.

The Treaty of Buftea was concluded on 5 March [O.S. 20 February] 1918.

== Preamble ==
The preamble of the treaty stated the wish of the signatory parties to end the hostilities and to extend the truce for 14 days, starting with 5 March 1918, during which the provisions of the final treaty could be agreed upon.

== Terms ==
- Romania relinquishes to the Central Powers the Dobruja as far as the Danube.
- The Central Powers will take care to maintain the commercial route for Romania by way of Constanța to the Black Sea.
- The frontier corrections demanded by Austria-Hungary along the Austro-Hungarian-Romanian boundary are, in principle, accepted by Romania.
- Likewise, measures of an economic nature and adequate to the situation are, in principle, accepted.
- The Romanian Government obligates itself to demobilize forthwith at least 8 divisions of the Romanian Army. The operation of the demobilization will be carried out in common by the supreme command of the Mackensen army group and by the supreme command of the Romanian army. As soon as peace is reestablished between Russia and Romania, the remaining parts of the Romanian Army are also to be demobilized, in so far as they are not needed for the maintenance of order along the Russo-Romanian frontier.
- The Romanian troops must immediately evacuate the territory of the Austro-Hungarian monarchy occupied by them.
- The Romanian Government obligates itself to aid as far as lies in its power in transporting troops of the Central Powers by rail through Moldavia and Bessarabia to Odessa.
- Romania obligates herself to dismiss at once officers of the Allies and still in Romanian service. Safe conduct is insured to these officers on the part of the Central Powers.
- This treaty goes immediately into force.

== Aftermath ==
The preliminary treaty of Buftea was followed by the negotiation and signing of the final peace treaty between Kingdom of Romania and the Central Powers, concluded on 7 May 1918 in Bucharest.

== See also ==
- Romania during World War I
