= Agrarian League (Romania) =

Agrarian League Liga Agrară
- President: Constantin Argetoianu
- Founder: Constantin Argetoianu
- Founded: 1931
- Dissolved: 1933
- Split from: People's Party
- Succeeded by: Agrarian Union Party
- Ideology: Agrarianism; Monarchism; Romanian nationalism
- Political position: Centre

The Agrarian League (Romanian: Liga Agrară, LA) was a political party in Romania.

== History ==
A breakaway from the People's Party, the LA contested the 1931 elections as part of the National Union alliance. The alliance won 274 seats, of which the LA took four.

It ran alone in the 1932 elections, but received just 0.5% of the vote and failed to win a seat.

== Election results ==
=== Parliamentary elections ===
Election	Votes	%	Chamber	Senate	Position
1931	Part of the National Union		8 / 387	0 / 113	
1932	14,831	0.5	0 / 387	0 / 113	16th
