= Democratic Peasants' Party–Stere =

20th-century Romanian political party

The Democratic Peasants' Party–Stere (Romanian: Partidul Țărănesc-Democrat–Stere, PȚD–Stere) was an agrarian socialist political party in Romania.

== History ==
The party was established by Constantin Stere after he left the National Peasants' Party (PNȚ). In the 1931 general elections, PȚD–Stere ran in an alliance with the League Against Usury (LCC). The alliance received 3% of the vote, winning six seats in the Chamber of Deputies. The LCC took one seat and the PȚD-Stere took five. The party ran alone in the 1932 elections, receiving 1% of the vote and losing all five seats. It later merged into the new Radical Peasants' Party (PȚD), which was established in 1933.

== Election results ==
=== Parliamentary elections ===
Election	Votes	%	Chamber	Senate	Position
1931	80,570	2.83	5 / 387	0 / 113	9th
1932	41,454	1.43	0 / 387	0 / 113	14th
