= Paul Sterian =

Romanian civil servant (1904–1984)

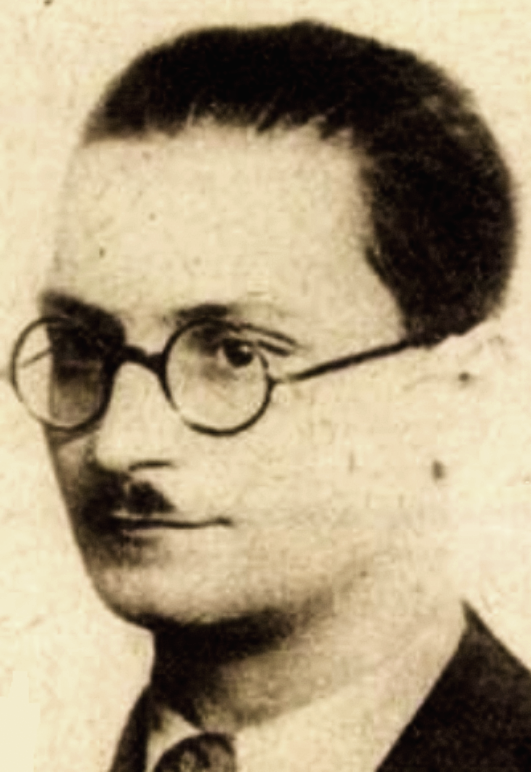
Sterian in 1939

Paul Sterian (May 1, 1904 – September 14, 1984) was a Romanian poet and civil servant.

== Biography ==
Born into a cultured family in Bucharest, his parents were physician Eraclie Sterian and his wife Alexandrina (née Gulimănescu); he was married to Margareta Sterian. From 1910 to 1917, Sterian attended the applied school of the society for the education of the Romanian people, followed by Gheorghe Lazăr High School from 1918 to 1921. From 1921 to 1924, he studied at the philosophy and law faculty of the University of Bucharest. He earned a degree magna cum laude, with a thesis on the emotions and the endocrine glands, applying a theory by Constantin Ion Parhon. Also at Bucharest, he took a doctorate in public law, his dissertation dealing with copyright. From 1926 to 1929, he studied at the University of Paris; Sterian's second doctoral thesis, in law and economics, had to do with Romania and World War I reparations. In Paris, upon the recommendation of Mircea Vulcănescu, Ilarie Voronca, and Benjamin Fondane, he worked for an insurance firm.

Dragus (1929) by Paul Sterian

He was valued by Dimitrie Gusti, performing psychotechnic tests in a rural environment as part of the sociologist's research teams and working on the 1929 film about Drăguș village. From 1929 to 1930, he was a civil servant at the Labor Ministry, then in 1931 headed the national office for student aid. In this capacity, he was able to join a League of Nations-affiliated institute in 1932. In 1931, he was in New York City on a scholarship from the Rockefeller Foundation. In 1932, he was an editor for Curentul and Cuvântul newspapers; the following year, he worked as an economic adviser. He was an administrator for the 1937 Paris Expo; in 1938, he became economic adviser to the Romanian legation in Washington, D.C. and head of Romania's economic legation in New York City. After returning home, Sterian worked at the Ministries of National Economy (1940–1941), Finance (1942) and Foreign Affairs (1944).

After the 1944 coup d'état, he was excluded from the government but not charged with war crimes; from 1945 to 1948, until nationalization, he headed a textile factory. In 1948, upon the advent of the communist regime, he became a day laborer, followed by an accountant's position in 1950. In 1951, he began inspecting credit records at Tecuci. He successively worked as an accountant in Bucharest (1953), Balotești (1954), and at the state fruit and vegetable monopoly Aprozar (1956). In 1957 and 1963, he was head of external relations for the composers' union, holding a similar position at the geriatrics institute from 1964 to 1969. In the late 1950s, he was arrested and sent to Aiud Prison; it is possible that this was due not to his work during the Ion Antonescu regime but because of his affiliation with the "Burning Pyre" (Rugul Aprins) Romanian Orthodox prayer group. Sterian had made donations to Antim Monastery and held conferences there in 1948-1949. He was amnestied in the early 1960s. His literary work appeared in Contimporanul, Azi, Floarea de foc, Gândirea, Cuvântul, unu and Viața Românească.
