= Grigore Iunian =

Romanian politician and lawyer

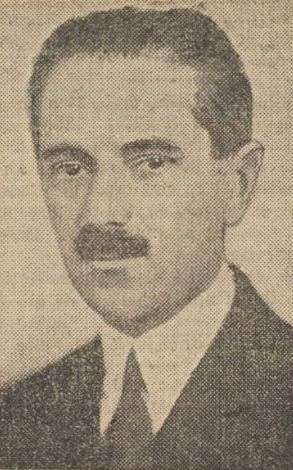
Grigore Iunian (1882–1940) was a Romanian lawyer and politician, Minister of Justice and Minister of Labour.

Grigore Iunian (September 30, 1882 – 1939) was a Romanian left-wing politician and lawyer. A member of the National Liberal Party (PNL) during the 1910s, he rallied with the Peasants' Party (PȚ) after World War I, and followed it into the National Peasants' Party (PNȚ), before leaving in 1933 to create the Radical Peasants' Party (PȚR), over which he presided until his death.

== Biography ==
Born in Târgu Jiu, Iunian was the son of a lawyer. He studied law at the University of Bucharest, and joined the bar association after first entering politics with the PNL and being elected to the Chamber of Deputies. According to the politician and memoirist Constantin Xeni,

"Gr. Iunian had ten years of fame in law practice. He honored the bar, and his memory deserves to live on. Among his contemporaries, between 1925 and 1938, there surely were more distinguished lawyers. But Iunian was not just a lawyer, not just a diligent jurist in studying the case and conscious in his exposition. He was a cultivated man, a warm-hearted and honest politician, a passionate fighter and a man with a heart as few others had."

During the Romanian Campaign of 1916-1918, when Bucharest was occupied by the Central Powers, Iunian took refuge in Iași (where the National Liberal Ion I. C. Brătianu headed government). As the conflict ended and Greater Romania was established, he became enthusiastic with the Poporanist cause of the newly created PȚ, and left the PNL. According to Xeni, he had also grown disenchanted with Brătianu's "dictatorial personality".

As a PȚ deputy, Iunian backed Minister of Agriculture Ion Mihalache during his controversial proposal for land reform; after Mihalache resigned on March 12, 1920, he took up the legislative proposal and advanced it in Parliament, thus prolonging the conflict that led to the fall of the Alexandru Vaida-Voevod executive. He subsequently became noted in opposition to the Alexandru Averescu People's Party cabinet. In March 1921, it became known that Aron Schuller, an associate of the Finance and Interior Minister Constantin Argetoianu, had attempted to contract a 20 million lire loan with a bank in Italy by using as collateral Romanian war bonds that he had illegally obtained from the Finance Ministry reserve — consequently, Iunian proposed a motion of no confidence against the Averescu cabinet, but it was defeated when the PNL chose to continue backing the cabinet.

Together with other left-leaning activists (Constantin Titel Petrescu, Dem I. Dobrescu, Nicolae L. Lupu, Constantin Mille, Constantin Rădulescu-Motru, Victor Eftimiu, Constantin Costa-Foru, Radu R. Rosetti, and Virgil Madgearu), Iunian established, in 1923, Liga Drepturilor Omului (League for Human Rights), which voiced protests against the new Brătianu executive.

After the PȚ merged with Iuliu Maniu's Romanian National Party (1926), Iunian became vice president of the newly created PNȚ. Beginning in November 1928, when the PNȚ came to power, Iunian was Minister of Justice in the Maniu and Gheorghe Mironescu cabinets. According to historian Toader Paleologu, Iunian attempted to preserve a middle ground in respect to the two centrifugal tendencies inside the grouping, while opposing the PNȚ tendency for collaboration with the increasingly authoritarian King Carol II:

"Grigore Iunian was the consistent partisan of openness in relations with Carol II, of strict legality in respect to the extremist parties and creating a large center-left coalition on the basis of an actual common program. In effect, his principled attitude placed him in a very courageous situation: partisans of the King competed in repressing extreme elements with the aid of measures that were debatable from a legal point of view, and the so-called left came to ally itself with the Iron Guard against the Liberals."

Confronted with the Great Depression and the insolvency of many small landowners, Iunian proposed to devalue the Romanian leu until most debts were to be paid; the idea failed to win him support. In October 1933, he took decision to leave and form the Radical Peasants' Party around the journal Deșteptarea on November 22, 1933. According to Xeni, Iunian also had "little sympathy" for Maniu's leadership. The new PȚR, having Mihail Paleologu among its prominent members, absorbed the Democratic Peasants' Party, created by Constantin Stere, in February 1933. At the time, Xeni argued, Iunian's support for democratic government was becoming "a pointless struggle".

In its columns, Deşteptarea stressed that "capitalism develops in its body the seed for its own destruction" and called for "socializing the means of production" in industry, while supporting "cooperative farming, through which the agricultural production would be managed and the equal sharing of produce will be ensured". Adding to this a call for economic planning, the PȚR indicated that its ultimate goal was "the democratic state of workers".

In 1936, Iunian was called as a witness in the trial of Petre Constantinescu-Iași and other seven members of the Romanian Communist Party, which was housed in Chișinău. Witnessing irregularities in procedures (such as Romanian Army soldiers guarding the hall), he stated: "I shall not lend myself to a farce. I did not know, upon arriving here, that it was to be a simulacrum".

The PȚR came to clash with the National Christian Party and the Octavian Goga cabinet in 1937-1938. It was eventually banned together with all other parties in early 1938, when King Carol created the National Renaissance Front; Iunian returned to the bar, but suffered a stroke and became afflicted with cerebral palsy, which, according to Xeni, were due to stress caused by

"political deceptions, the unequal tyranny with which he could not make his peace, the liquidation of all parliamentary activity which he cared so passionately for [...]."

He progressively lost his speech and motor skills, and ultimately died soon after turning 55.

== Legacy ==
After the establishment of a Communist regime in the wake of World War II, Iunian's son Petre, a physician, was held as a political prisoner in the Aiud penal facility. Nevertheless, Grigore Iunian's image was exploited by the Communists: alongside other members of Liga Drepturilor Omului, as well as Nicolae Iorga, Nicolae Titulescu, Traian Bratu, Grigore Filipescu, and Mitiță Constantinescu, he was considered a "progressive" forerunner. In a 1975 speech, Communist leader Nicolae Ceaușescu stated:

"A series of politicians such as Nicolae Titulescu, Nicolae Iorga, Grigore Iunian, Virgil Madgearu, Dem. Dobrescu, Grigore Filipescu and others took a stand against the aggressive expansion of Nazi Germany, unmasked the internal fascist activity, militated for developing collaboration with other states and strengthening the country's security."
