= Agrarian Union Party =

Defunct Romanian political party

Agrarian Union Party Partidul Uniunea Agrară
- President: Constantin Argetoianu
- Founder: Constantin Argetoianu
- Founded: 1933
- Dissolved: 1938
- Preceded by: Agrarian League
- Merged into: National Renaissance Front
- Ideology: Agrarianism; Monarchism; Romanian nationalism
- Political position: Center to center-right

The Agrarian Union Party (Romanian: Partidul Uniunea Agrară, PUA) was a political party in Romania.

== History ==
The party first contested national elections in 1931, when it was part of the National Union alliance created for the general elections that year. The alliance won 289 of the 387 seats in the Chamber of Deputies, although the PUA did not take any of them.

The party contested the 1932 elections in alliance with the National Union–Iorga, the Democratic Nationalist Party and the National Party. The alliance won five seats in the Chamber of Deputies, of which the PUA took two.

The PUA contested the 1933 elections alone, receiving 2.5% of the vote and winning five seats in the Chamber. However, its vote share fell to 1.7% in the 1937 elections, resulting in it losing all five seats. It did not contest any further elections.

== Election results ==
=== Parliamentary elections ===
Election	Votes	Percentage	Chamber	Senate	Position	Government
1931	Part of the National Union				–	Government
1932	Part of the National Union		2 / 387	0 / 113	–	Opposition
1933	73,208	2.5%	5 / 387	0 / 113	9th	Opposition
1937	52,101	1.7%	0 / 387	0 / 113	8th	Opposition
