= 1937 Romanian general election =

- 20 December 1937

All 387 seats in the Chamber of Deputies All 113 seats in the Senate
- Turnout: 66.07%
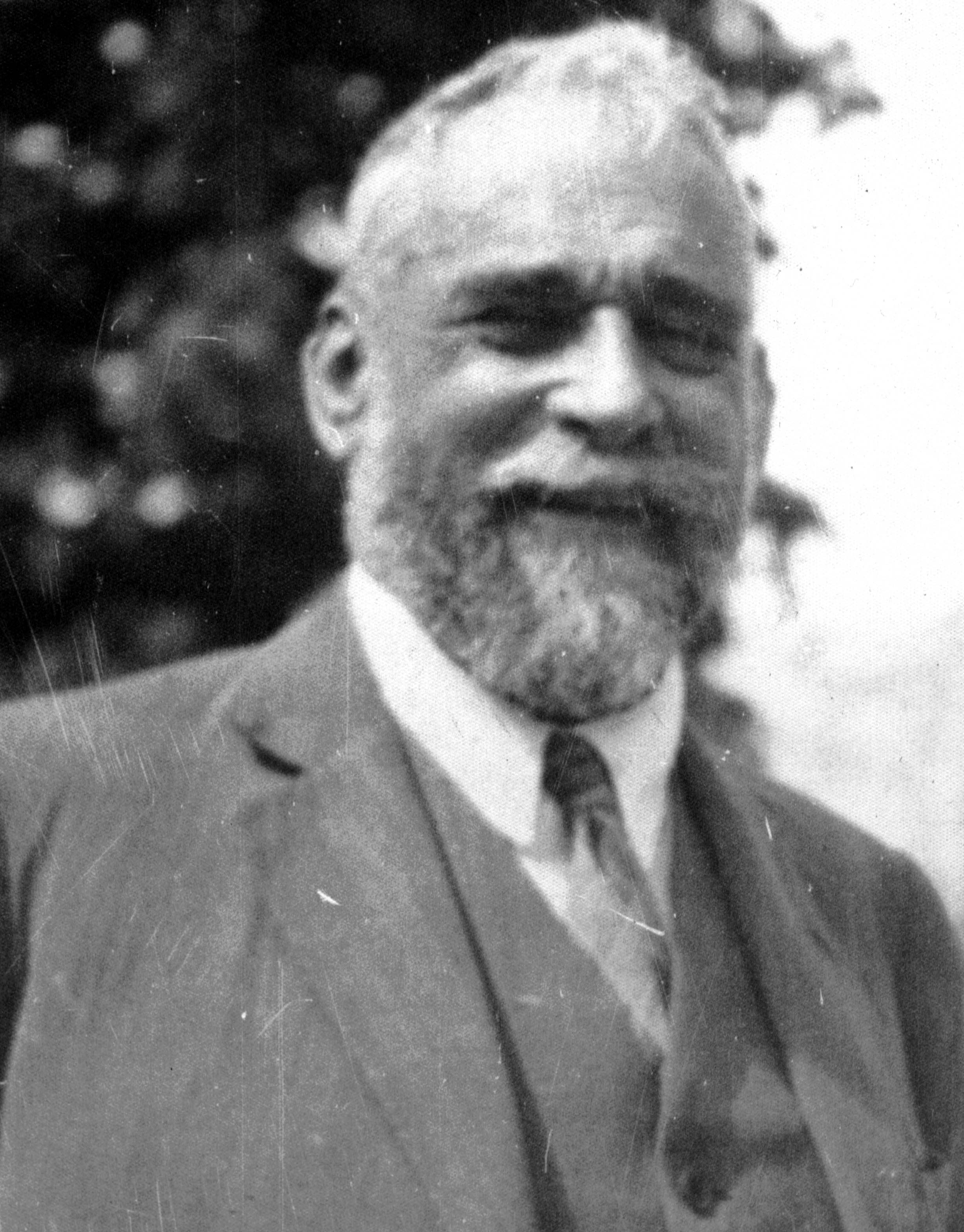

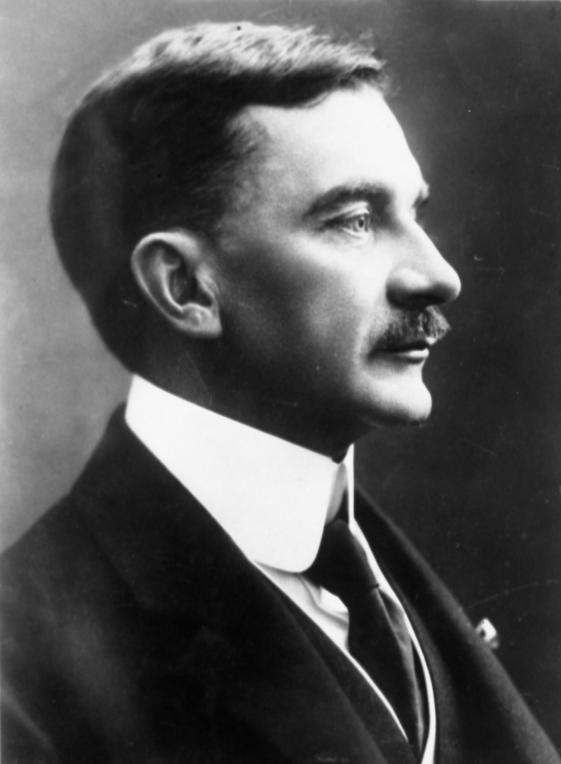

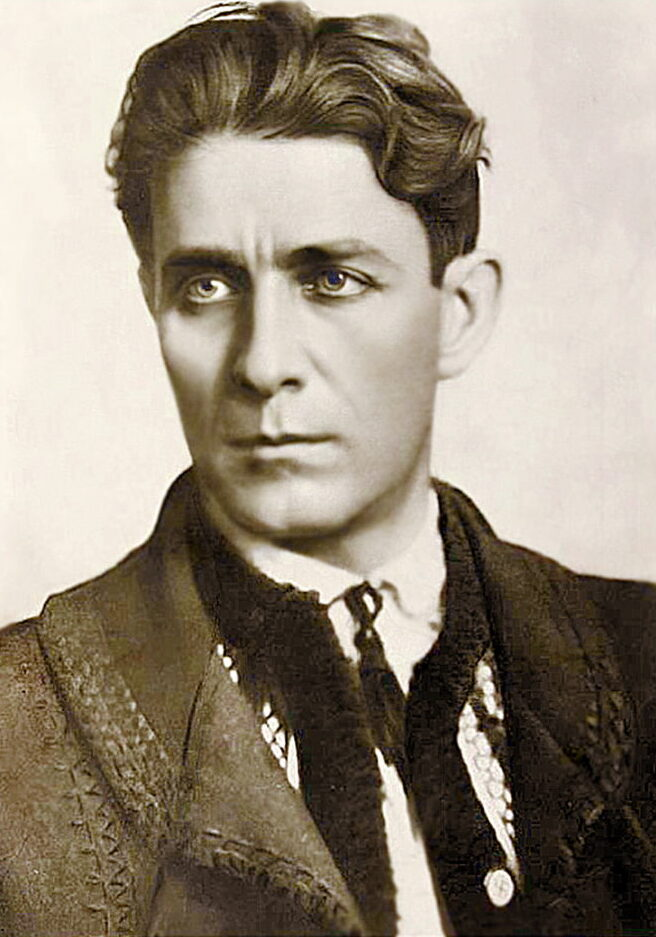

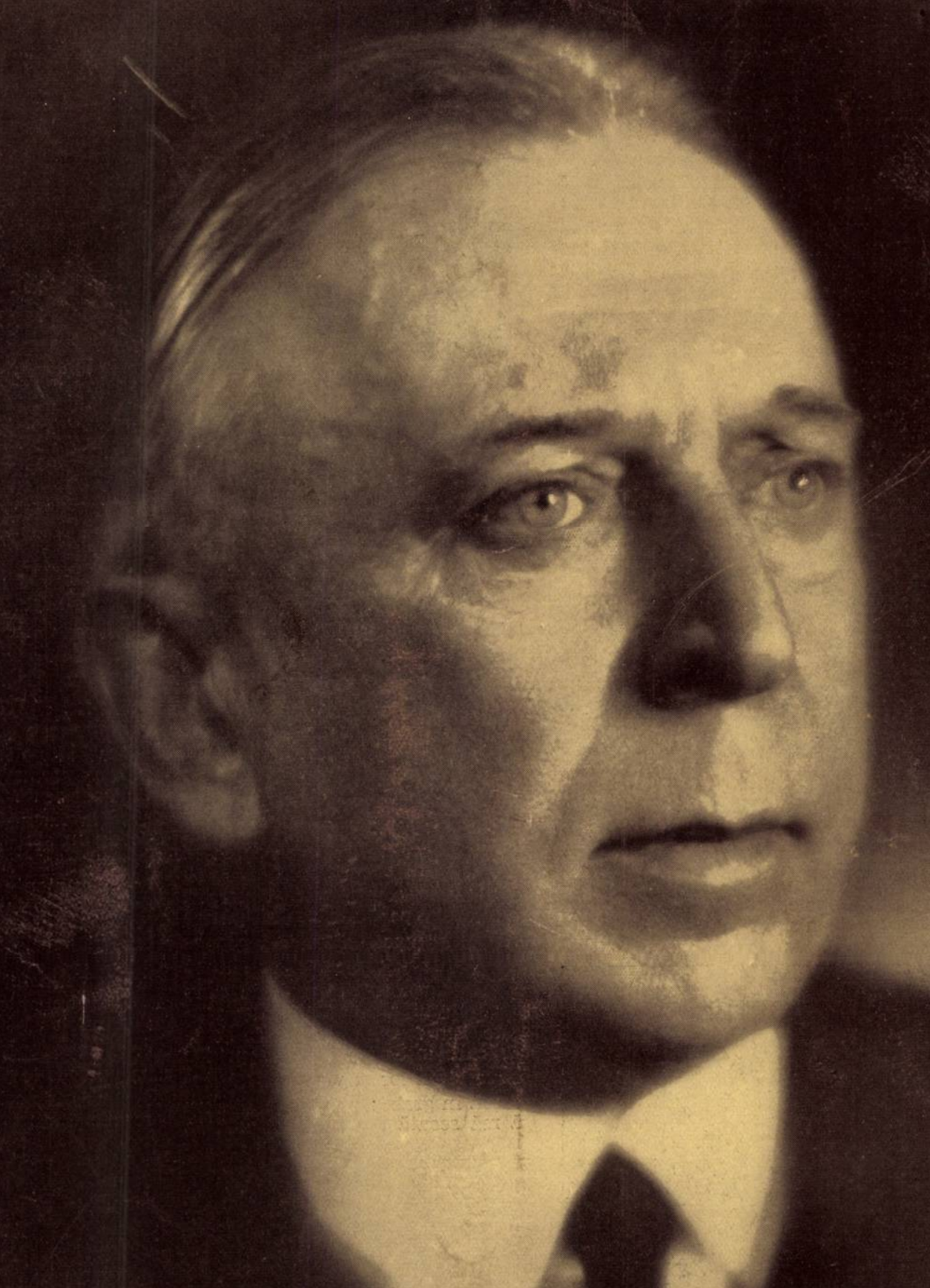
	First party	Second party
Leader	Dinu Brătianu	Iuliu Maniu
Party	PNL	PNȚ
Leader since	1934	1937
Last election	105 S / 300 D	0 S / 29 D
Seats won	97 S / 152 D	10 S / 86 D
Seat change	▼8 S / ▼148 D	▲10 S / ▲57 D
Popular vote	1,103,353 D	626,612 D
Percentage	36.46% D	20.71% D
	Third party	Fourth party
Leader	Corneliu Zelea Codreanu	Octavian Goga
Party	TpȚ	PNC
Leader since	1933	1935
Last election	–	0 S / 18 D
Seats won	4 S / 66 D	0 S / 39 D
Seat change	New	0 S / ▲21 D
Popular vote	478,378 D	281,167 D
Percentage	15.81% D	9.29% D
Prime Minister before election
Gheorghe Tătărescu
PNL
Elected Prime Minister
Octavian Goga
PNC

General elections were held in Romania in December 1937. The Chamber of Deputies was elected on 20 December, whilst the Senate was elected in three stages on 22, 28 and 30 December. Voting was by universal male suffrage, making them the last elections held before women could vote.

The National Liberal Party remained the largest party, winning 152 of the 387 seats in the Chamber of Deputies and 97 of the 112 the Senate seats. However, unlike all previous elections organised by partisan governments, the results did not give the governing party a majority. The National Liberals' unexpectedly poor showing prevented it from creating a government on its own (obtaining 40% of the vote would have automatically awarded them a large parliamentary majority). They ruled out a coalition with their arch-rivals, the second-placed National Peasants' Party, or with the third-placed Iron Guard's Everything for the Country Party. King Carol II invited the fascist Octavian Goga to form a government, though his National Christian Party finished fourth and had an avowedly antisemitic platform. Goga's government was formed on 29 December 1937.

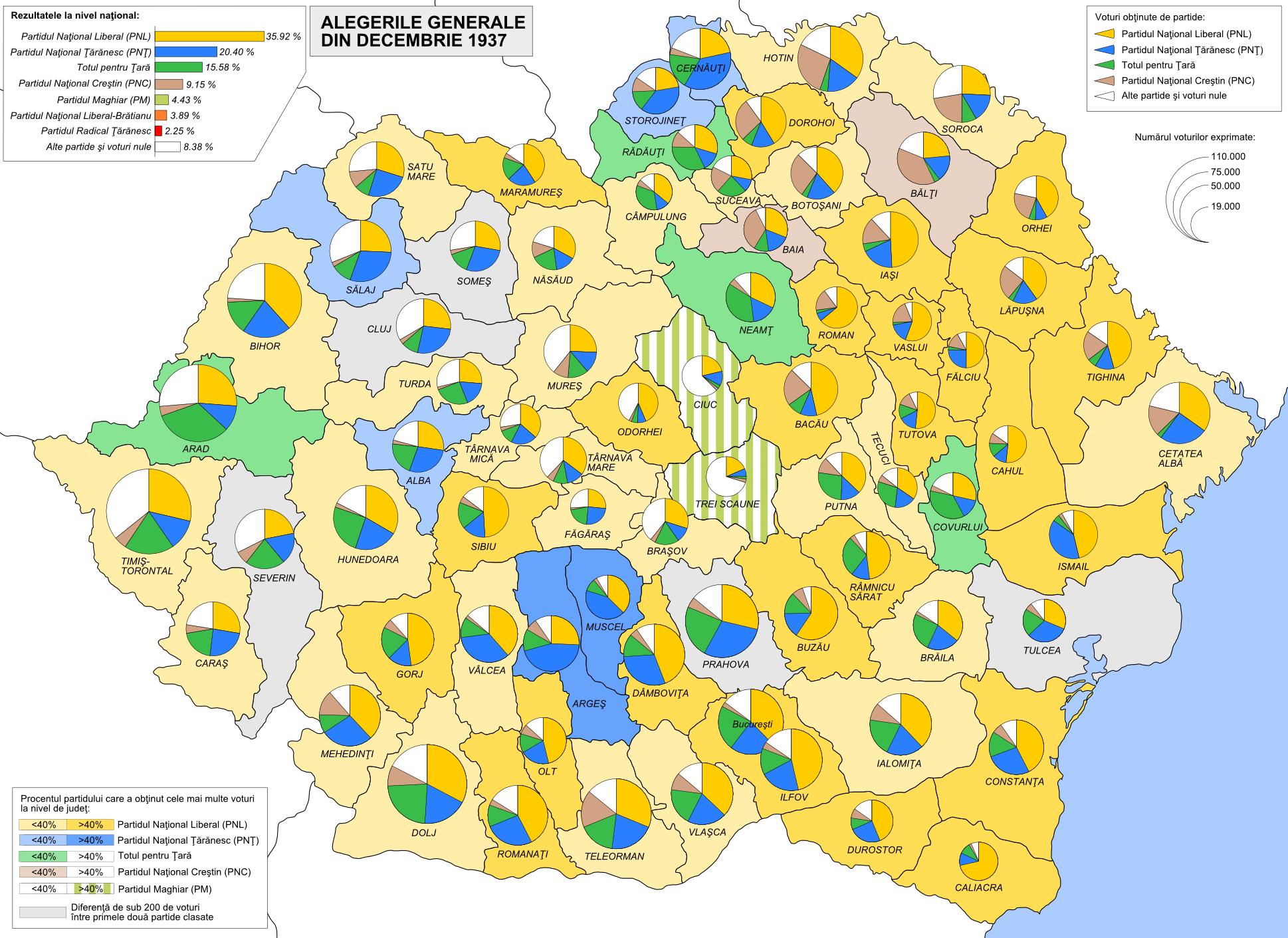
Results of the 1937 general elections at county level

== Electoral system ==
The members of the Chamber of Deputies were elected from multi-member constituencies with between two and twenty seats. Seats were allocated on a proportional basis, unless a party received over 40% of the vote nationally. If this happened, the party in question was awarded half of the seats in each constituency, with the other half divided proportionally amongst the all parties (including the victorious one), with an electoral threshold of 2%.

The Senate was elected on a plurality basis. Voters had to be at least 21 to vote in the Chamber elections and 25 to vote in Senate elections. Candidates for both bodies had to be at least 40 years old.

== Campaign ==
The campaign was marred by violent clashes between the two fascist groups, the National Christian Party's Lăncieri and the Iron Guard. During the first round, clashes occurred at Orhei and Târgu Mureş, when four were killed and which led to 300 arrests.

After the vote, the Electoral Commission surprised observers by deciding, in its allocation of seats by proportional representation, to count the entire country as one district, rather than use smaller districts, as had been the norm.

== Results ==
=== Chamber of Deputies ===
Party	Votes	%	Seats	+/–
National Liberal Party	1,103,353	36.46	152	–148
National Peasants' Party	626,612	20.71	86	+57
Everything for the Country Party	478,378	15.81	66	New
National Christian Party	281,167	9.29	39	+21
Magyar Party	136,139	4.50	19	+11
National Liberal Party–Brătianu	119,361	3.94	16	+6
Radical Peasants' Party	69,198	2.29	9	+3
Agrarian Union Party	52,101	1.72	0	–5
Jewish Party	43,681	1.44	0	0
German Party	43,612	1.44	0	New
Social Democratic Party	28,840	0.95	0	0
People's Party	25,567	0.84	0	0
Traders Council	1,219	0.04	0	0
Other parties	16,912	0.56	0	–
Total	3,026,140	100.00	387	0
Valid votes	3,026,140	98.52		
Invalid/blank votes	45,555	1.48		
Total votes	3,071,695	100.00		
Registered voters/turnout	4,649,163	66.07		
Source: Sternberger et al., Nohlen & Stöver

=== Senate ===
Party	Seats	+/–
National Liberal Party	97	–8
National Peasants' Party	10	+10
Everything for the Country Party	4	New
Magyar Party	2	–1
Total	113	+5
Source: Nohlen & Stöver

== Aftermath ==
The elections were the last elections held under the nominally democratic 1923 constitution. On 18 January 1938, less than a month after the elections, Goga asked Carol to dissolve Parliament. Carol granted the request, with a view toward holding fresh elections that winter. However, Carol became alarmed with overtures being made by the National Christian Party towards the Iron Guard, and on 10 February 1938 he sacked Goga after only 45 days in office, suspended the constitution, cancelled the elections, and seized emergency powers. Later that year Carol pushed through a new constitution that concentrated all power in his hands, effectively codifying his emergency powers and turning his government into a royal dictatorship.

As a result, the elections were the last free multi-party elections until 1990. Elections held in 1939 featured a single list from Carol's National Renaissance Front. By the time of the first elections after World War II in 1946, the country had passed through two more dictatorships and a fourth, Communist one was rapidly consolidating.
