= Radical Peasants' Party =

Defunct political party in Romania

The Radical Peasants' Party (Romanian: Partidul Radical-Țărănesc, PRȚ) was a political party in Romania.

== History ==
The party was established by Grigore Iunian on 22 November 1933, absorbing the Democratic Peasants' Party–Stere. It won six seats in the Chamber of Deputies in the December 1933 general elections. In the 1937 elections it won nine seats, but was banned the following year following the introduction of the 1938 constitution.

== Election results ==
=== Parliamentary elections ===
Election	Votes	%	Chamber	Senate	Position	Status
1933	82,930	2.84	6 / 387	0 / 113	8th	Opposition
1937	69,198	2.29	9 / 387	0 / 113	7th	Opposition
