= Băile Govora =

- Town
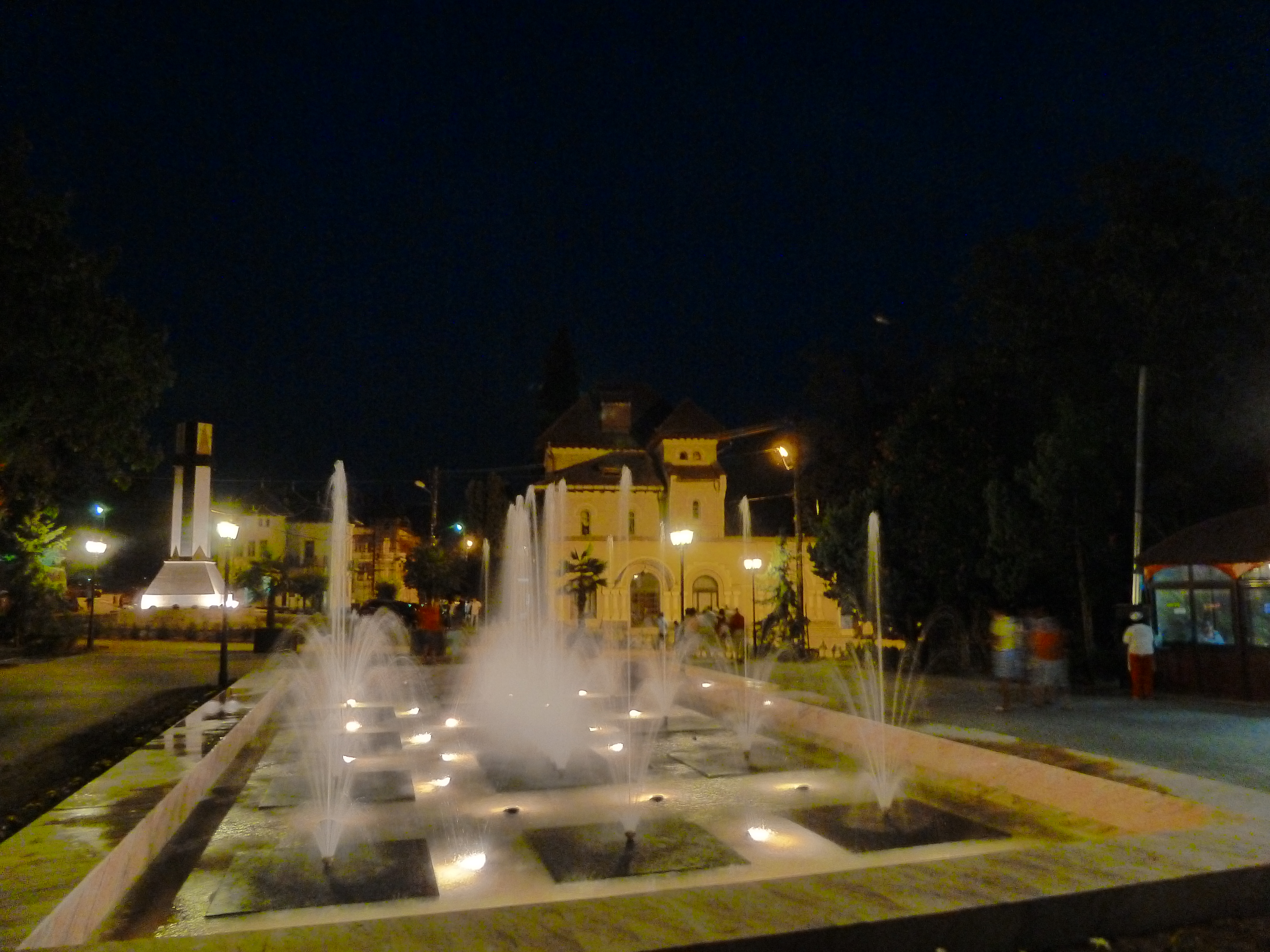

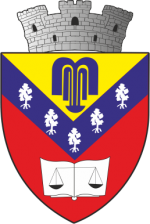
- Coat of arms

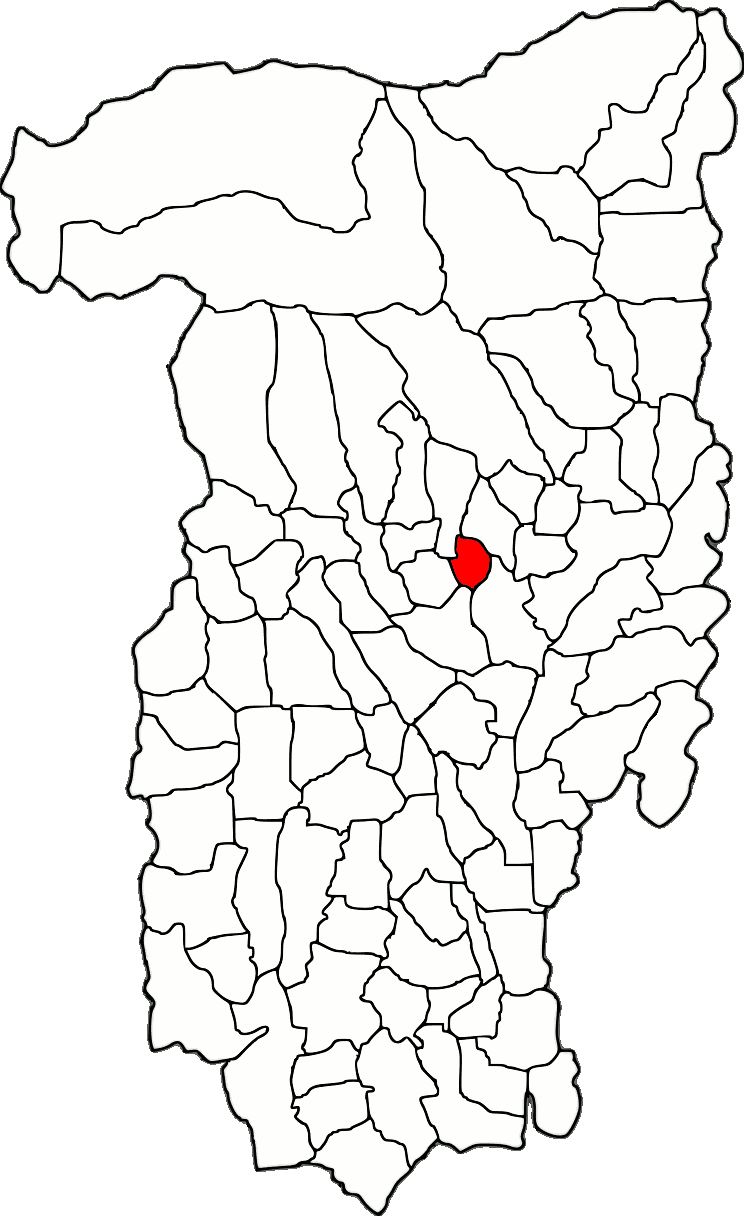
- Location in Vâlcea County

- Location in Romania
- Coordinates: 45°4′48″N 24°10′47″E
- Country: Romania
- County: Vâlcea

Government
  - Mayor (2024–2028): Mihai Mateescu (PSD)
- Area: 13.79 km^{2} (5.32 sq mi)
- Elevation: 300 m (980 ft)
- Population (2021-12-01): 2,158
  - Density: 156.5/km^{2} (405.3/sq mi)
- Time zone: UTC+02:00 (EET)
  - Summer (DST): UTC+03:00 (EEST)
- Postal code: 245200
- Area code: (+40) 02 50
- Vehicle reg.: VL
- Website: www.primaria-baile-govora.ro

Historical population
| Year | Pop. | ±% |
|---|---|---|
| 1930 | 910 | — |
| 1948 | 1,156 | +27.0% |
| 1956 | 1,590 | +37.5% |
| 1966 | 2,189 | +37.7% |
| 1977 | 2,749 | +25.6% |
| 1992 | 3,023 | +10.0% |
| 2002 | 3,147 | +4.1% |
| 2011 | 2,353 | −25.2% |
| 2021 | 2,158 | −8.3% |
Source: Census data

Băile Govora (or just Govora) is a Romanian spa town in Vâlcea County, about 20 km (12 mi) south-west of Râmnicu Vâlcea and west of the Olt River, in the historical region of Oltenia. Notable features of the town (beside its mineral springs, recommended for a variety of ailments) include the Govora Abbey (built in the 15th century and consolidated by Matei Basarab and later by Constantin Brâncoveanu) and the nearby Dintr-un lemn Monastery (16th or 17th century; the legend of its origin was recorded by Paul of Aleppo).

Govora Abbey was the site where Matei Basarab introduced the first printing press in Wallachia – where the first written code of laws in Romanian was published, Pravila de la Govora, in 1640.

The town administers three villages: Curăturile, Gătejești, and Prajila.

== Notable people ==
- Mihai Constantinescu (1932–2019), film director and screenwriter
- Alexander Marmureanu (born 1962), surgeon
