= 1931 Romanian general election =

- 1–8 June 1931

All 387 seats in the Chamber of Deputies All 113 seats in the Senate
- Turnout: 72.48%
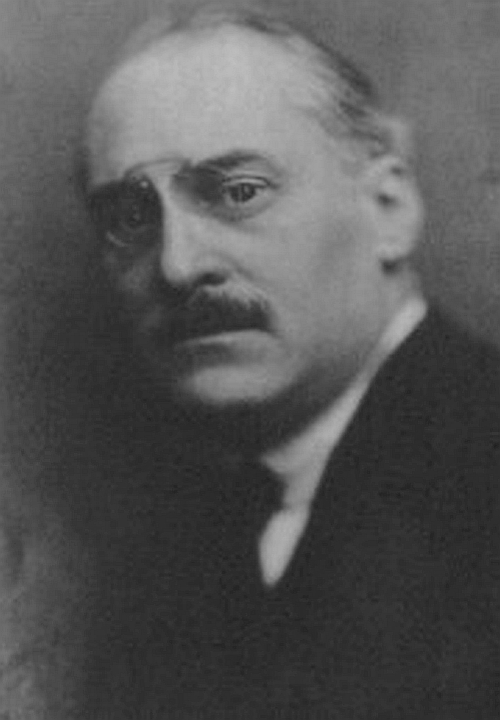

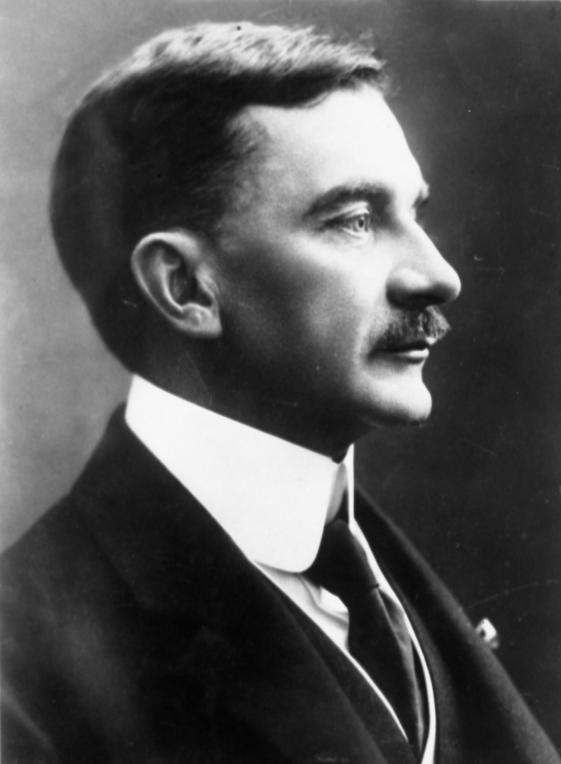

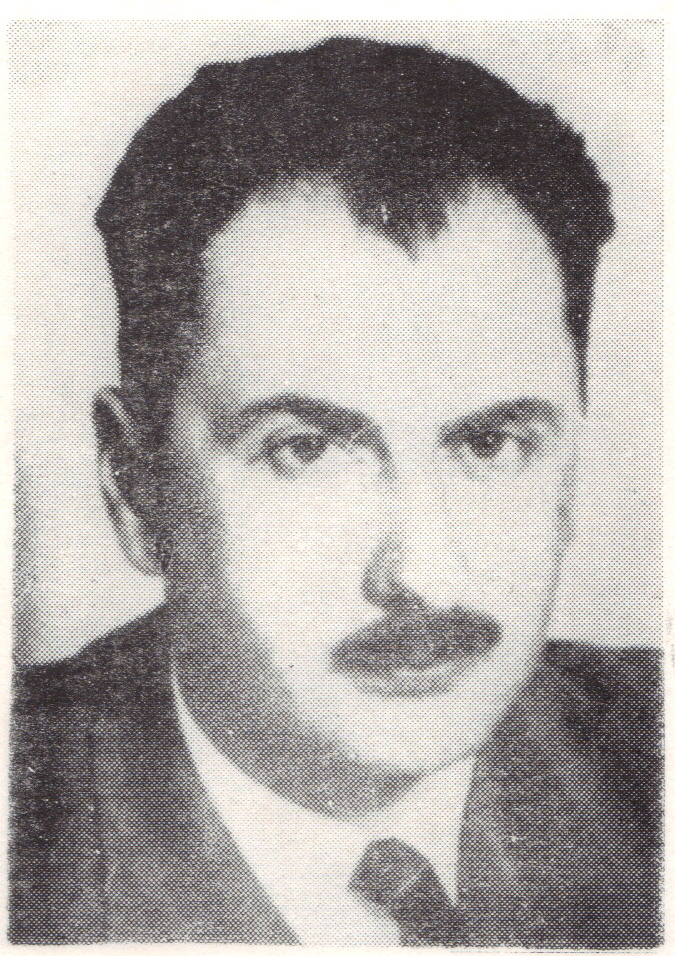

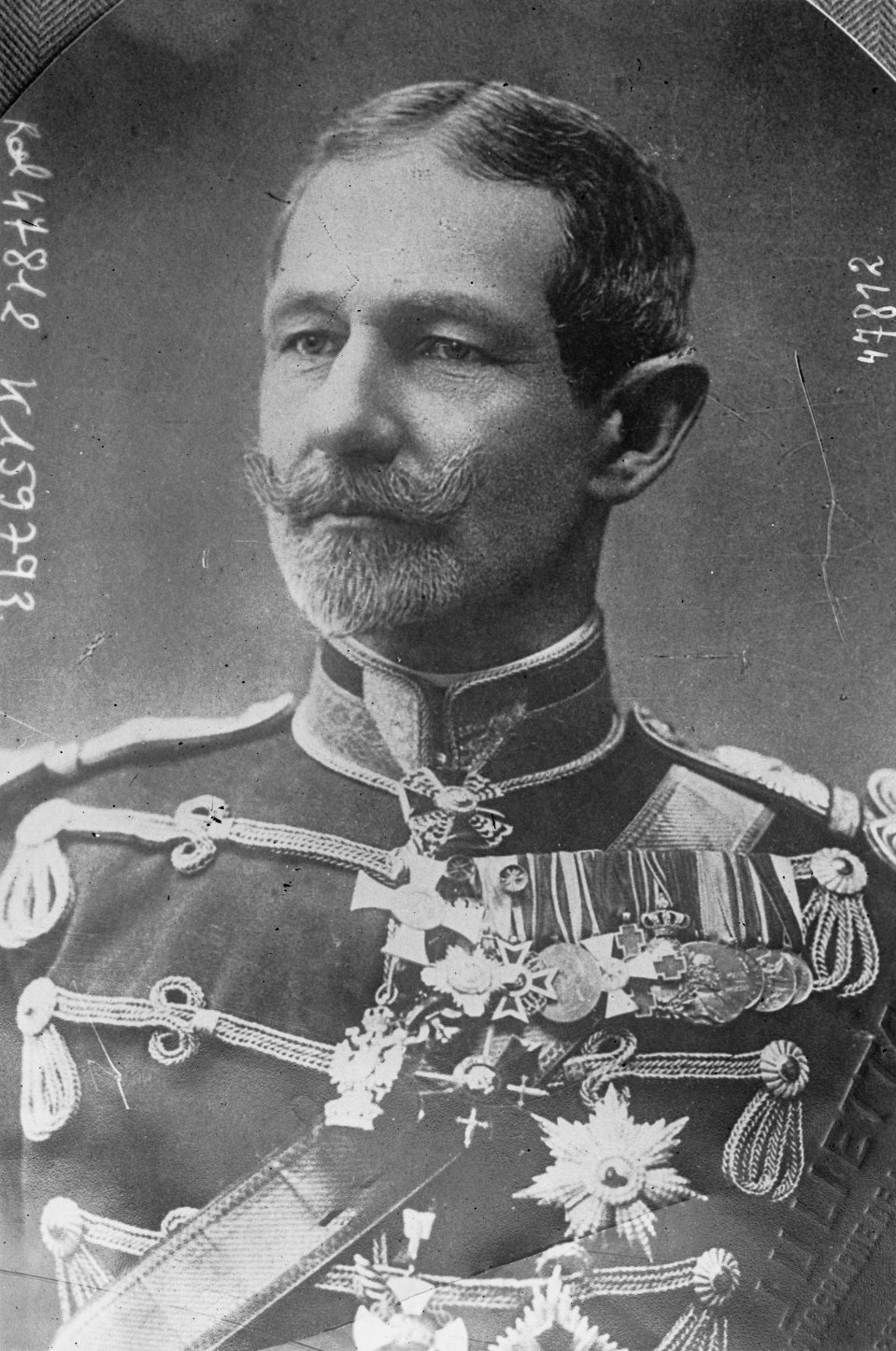

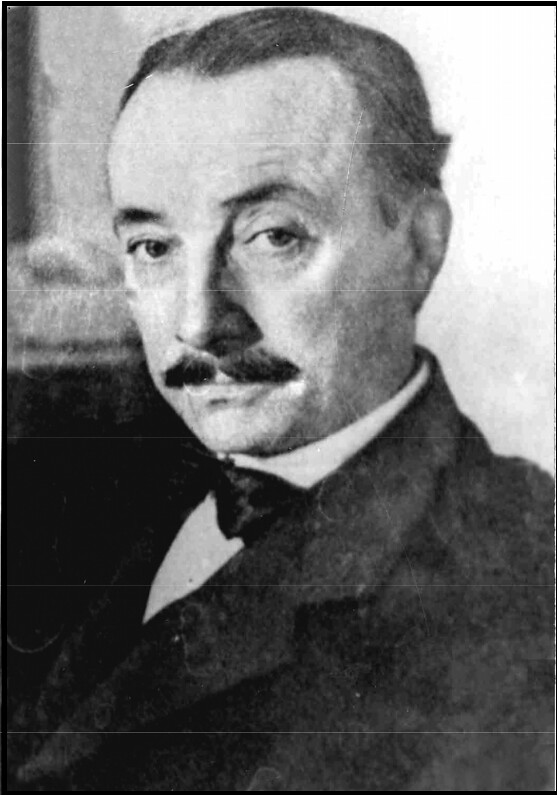

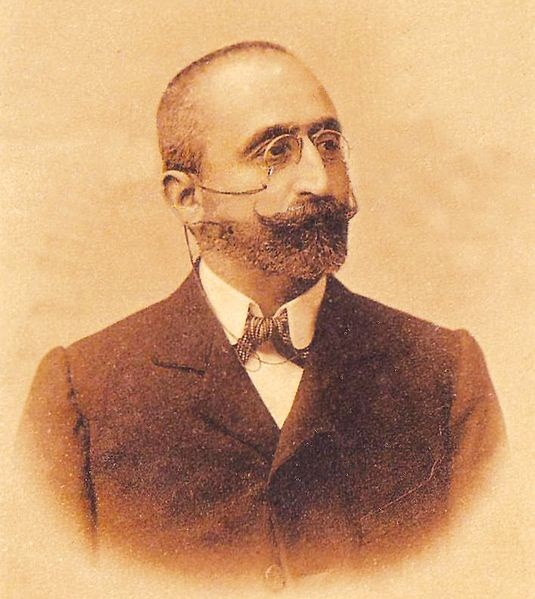
	First party	Second party	Third party
Leader	Ion Duca	Iuliu Maniu	Gheorghe Brătianu
Party	National Union	PNȚ	PNL–Brătianu
Leader since	28 December 1930 (PNL-Duca)	10 October 1926 (party foundation)	15 June 1930 (party foundation)
Last election	–	105 S / 348 D	–
Seats won	108 S / 289 D	1 S / 30 D	0 S / 12 D
Seat change	New	▼104 S / ▼296 D	New
Popular vote	1,389,901 D	438,747 D	173,586 D
Percentage	48.86%	15.42%	6.10%
Swing	New	▼63.8pp	New
	Fourth party	Fifth party	Sixth party
Leader	Alexandru Averescu	György Bethlen	A. C. Cuza
Party	PP	PM	LANC
Leader since	3 April 1918 (party foundation)	1 April 1926	March 1923 (party foundation)
Last election	0 S / 5 D	0 S / 16 D	0 S / 0 D
Seats won	0 S / 10 D	0 S / 10 D	0 S / 8 D
Seat change	0 S / ▲5 D	0 S / ▼6 D	0 S / ▲8 D
Popular vote	141,141 D	139,003 D	113,863 D
Percentage	4.96%	4.89%	4.00%
Swing	▲2.5pp	▼1.3pp	▲2.8pp
Prime Minister before election
Nicolae Iorga
PND
Subsequent Prime Minister
Nicolae Iorga
PND

General elections were held in Romania in June 1931. The Chamber of Deputies was elected on 1 June, whilst the Senate was elected in three stages on 4, 6 and 8 June. The result was a victory for the governing National Union, an alliance of the National Party, the National Liberal Party, the German Party, the Agrarian Union Party, the Vlad Ţepeş League, the Agrarian League and several other parties. The Union won 289 of the 387 seats in the Chamber of Deputies and 108 of the 113 seats in the Senate elected through universal vote. The five seats won by the Communist-dominated Peasant Workers' Bloc were ultimately invalidated by the new Parliament.

== Results ==
=== Chamber of Deputies ===
Party	Votes	%	Seats	+/–
National Union (Note: Of the 289 National Union seats, eighty were taken by the National Liberal Party-Duca, ten by the German Party and eight by the Agrarian League. Three mandates (Mircea Iorga, Dimitrie Pompeiu and Petre Topa) were taken by PND.)	1,389,901	48.86	289	–
National Peasants' Party	438,747	15.42	30	–296
National Liberal Party–Brătianu	173,586	6.10	12	New
People's Party	141,141	4.96	10	–
Magyar Party	139,003	4.89	10	–6
National-Christian Defense League	113,863	4.00	8	+8
Peasants' Party–Lupu	100,682	3.54	7	+2
Social Democratic Party	94,957	3.34	6	–3
League Against Usury–PȚD-Stere (Note: Of the six seats won by the League against Usury and Democratic Peasants' Party–Stere, five were taken by the PȚD-S and one by the League against Usury.)	80,570	2.83	6	New
Peasant Workers' Bloc	73,716	2.59	5	+5
Jewish Party	64,193	2.26	4	+4
Legion of the Archangel Michael	30,783	1.08	0	New
Other parties	3,412	0.12	0	–
Total	2,844,554	100.00	387	0
Valid votes	2,844,554	97.18		
Invalid/blank votes	82,568	2.82		
Total votes	2,927,122	100.00		
Registered voters/turnout	4,038,464	72.48		
Source: Sternberger et al., Nohlen & Stöver

=== Senate ===
Party	Seats
National Union	108
Magyar Party	4
National Peasants' Party	1
Total	113
Source: Nohlen & Stöver
