= Constantin Argetoianu =

Romanian politician (1871–1955)

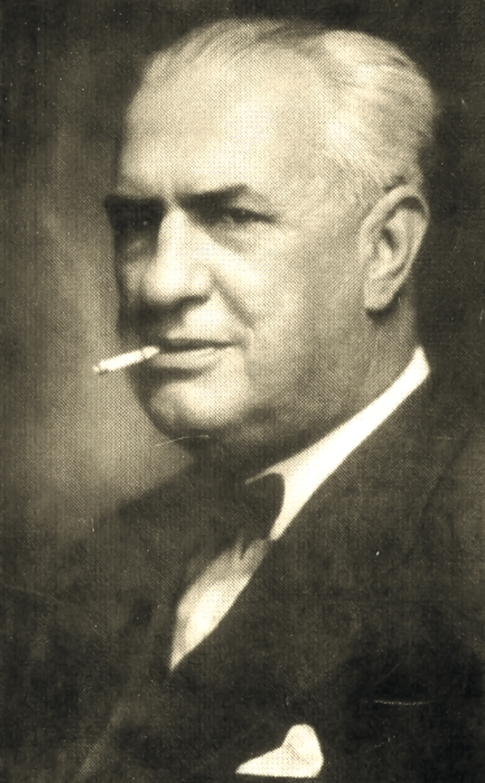
- Argetoianu in 1933

41st Prime Minister of Romania
- In office 28 September 1939 – 23 November 1939
- Monarch: Carol II
- Preceded by: Gheorghe Argeșanu
- Succeeded by: Gheorghe Tătărescu

35th President of the Senate of Romania
- In office 15 June 1939 – 5 September 1940
- Preceded by: Nicolae Iorga
- Succeeded by: None (Senate suspended in September 1940 and abolished on 15 July 1946)

Minister of Internal Affairs
- In office 13 June 1920 – 13 December 1921
- Prime Minister: Alexandru Averescu
- Preceded by: Alexandru Averescu
- Succeeded by: Ion Cămărășescu

Minister of Foreign Affairs of Romania
- In office 28 June 1940 – 4 July 1940
- Prime Minister: Gheorghe Tătărescu
- Preceded by: Ion Gigurtu
- Succeeded by: Mihail Manoilescu
- In office 18 April 1931 – 26 April 1932
- Prime Minister: Nicolae Iorga
- Preceded by: Ion Mihalache
- Succeeded by: Dimitrie I. G. Ghica

Minister of Industry and Commerce
- In office 10 February 1938 – 31 March 1938
- Prime Minister: Miron Cristea
- Preceded by: Ion Gigurtu
- Succeeded by: Mitiță Constantinescu

Personal details
- Born: 15 March 1871 Craiova, Romania
- Died: 6 February 1955 Sighet Prison, Romania
- Party: Conservative Party (1913–1918); People's Party (1918–1923); Democratic Nationalist Party (1924–1925); Romanian National Party (1925–1926); National Liberal Party (1926–1930); Agrarian League (1931–1933); Agrarian Union Party (1933–1938); National Renaissance Front (1938–1940); Party of the Nation (1940)
- Spouses: Clemența Talievici (divorced) Valentina Lahovari (née Boambă) (m. 1928)
- Children: Marie-Jeanne Argetoianu
- Profession: Businessman, physician, jurist

Constantin Argetoianu (15 March [O.S. 3 March] 1871 – 6 February 1955) was a Romanian politician, one of the best-known personalities of interwar Greater Romania, who served as the Prime Minister between 28 September and 23 November 1939. His memoirs, Memorii. Pentru cei de mâine. Amintiri din vremea celor de ieri (Memoirs. For those of tomorrow. Recollections of yesterday's world) — a cross section of Romanian society, were made known for the sharp critique of several major figures in Romanian politics (using a sarcastic tone which had made his previous political speeches notorious).

== Biography ==
=== Early life ===
Born in Craiova as the son of Army general Ioan Argetoianu, he trained in Law, Medicine, and Letters at the University of Paris, and later entered the diplomatic service (1897).

He was an exceptionally prosperous man (a noted Stock Exchange player and landowner in Breasta, Dolj County), and his frequent change in political allegiances was attributed by some of his contemporaries to his financial independence. In 1913 he served as a combat medic with the rank of captain in the Second Balkan War, where he faced a cholera epidemic.

=== World War I ===
A Freemason, Argetoianu was first elected to the Senate in 1914 as a Conservative Party representative, where he oscillated between the mainstream Conservatives of Petre P. Carp and the dissident group around Take Ionescu (the latter was welcoming Romania's entry into World War I on the side of the Entente Powers, which Argetoianu also proposed).

Throughout 1918, during the final stages of the Romanian Campaign, Argetoianu was Justice Minister, sitting on the first Averescu cabinet (at the time when authorities had retreated to Iași, once the southern half of the country was occupied by Imperial German, Austro-Hungarian and Bulgarian troops). He was also head of the Romanian delegation at the Peace preliminaries of Buftea, in 1918. The talks resulted in the punitive Treaty of Bucharest of May, which consecrated Romania's defeat by the Central Powers. His actions at the time were later the subject of an epigram by Cincinat Pavelescu (Pavelescu expressed his belief that the treaty and Argetoianu's views on fiscal policies were to be the subject of scorn for future generations):

Argetoiene, răutatea
Noi ți-o iertăm, căci ne iubești,
Dar ce va ști posteritatea?
Că-ți datorăm fiscalitatea
Și pacea de la București.

Translation:

Argetoianu, we can forgive your evil
Because you deeply love our nation,
But how shall we remember you as people?
By the excessive taxation
And the Bucharest Treaty's negotiation.

=== People's Party ===
Argetoianu followed Averescu into opposition to the Ion I. C. Brătianu's National Liberal Party (PNL) cabinet, and joined the People's Party (PP) created by the former. He later documented the populist message of the movement, and left testimonies of Averescu's spontaneous adulation by the crowds of peasants.

Argetoianu was Finance Minister and later Interior Minister in the second Averescu government of 1920. In March 1921, it was uncovered that an associate of his named Aron Schuller had attempted to contract a 20 million lire loan with a bank in Italy, using as collateral Romanian war bonds that he had illegally obtained from the Finance Ministry reserve. Argetoianu, who was still in charge at the time, became the target of attacks from the opposition group formed by the Romanian National Party and the Peasants' Party, being pressed by Virgil Madgearu and Grigore Iunian to explain himself (Iunian proposed a motion of no confidence, but the PNL continued to show its support for the PP).

=== Clash with communism and split with Averescu ===
Argetoianu soon became noted for his anti-communist stance: he carried out arrests of those Socialist Party members who, during their party's congress in May 1921, supported a maximalist platform and voted in favor of aligning their Socialist-Communist faction (future Communist Party of Romania) with the Comintern, citing the latter's condemnation of Greater Romania; all those arrested were prosecuted in the Dealul Spirii Trial. Argetoianu later stated that the arrest lacked legal grounds, and indicated that he purposely gave the Socialist Gheorghe Cristescu approval to hold the congress as a means to incriminate the faction. Faced with mixed reactions inside the cabinet (Averescu hesitated, while the Minister of Justice Grigore Trancu-Iași refused to give him support), he ordered the move without his fellow ministers' prior knowledge, and thus faced them with a fait accompli.

The standoff between Averescu and the parliamentary opposition eventually witnessed a decisive incident: during a prolonged debate over Averescu's proposal to nationalize enterprises in Reșița, Argetoianu addressed a mumbled insult to Madgearu; the PNL, seeing an opportunity for a return to power, expressed sympathy, and all opposition groups appealed to King Ferdinand, asking for Averescu's recall (14 July 1921).

Despite Averescu's eventual defeat in December 1921, Argetoianu was kept in office by the Take Ionescu and Brătianu cabinets. During the spring of 1922, he ordered the killing of several Communist activists who were held in prison custody, including Leonte Filipescu, staging their attempts to flee from under escort as a pretext. Nevertheless, pressures on the revolutionary grouping were relaxed in summer, when King Ferdinand approved an amnesty and Argetoianu officially declared that "communism is over in Romania".

=== PND and PNL ===
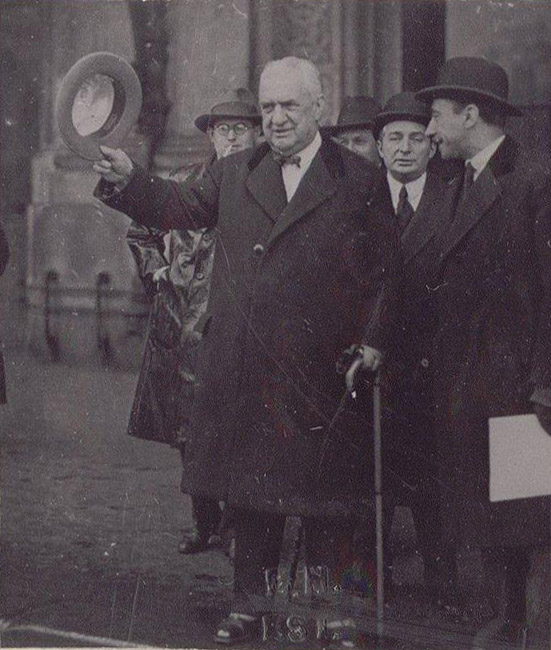
Argetoianu on a diplomatic tour to Western Europe, 1932

In 1923, after Brătianu again assumed power, he clashed with Averescu and proclaimed himself leader of the PP, being eventually expelled. Having joined Nicolae Iorga's Democratic Nationalist Party (PND), he soon vehemently protested against the latter's alliance with the Romanian National Party, and moved to the PNL.

Following the sudden death of Ion I. C. Brătianu in 1927, and choosing, in contrast to the policies of Dinu Brătianu, to support the new King Carol II in 1930, Argetoianu left the party and subsequently defined himself as an independent. In effect, he moved into the camp of politicians approving of an authoritarian regime around Carol. As the monarch's relations with the traditional political class were souring, Argetoianu allegedly engaged in a campaign to draw new allegiances from other environments, aiding to establish a Romanian camarilla — it was even reported that, using the official commitment to neutral technocracy as a means to appoint his choice of people to positions of influence, he had recruited his fellow Jockey Club of Bucharest members. Among his most vocal supporters at the time was the far-right philosopher Nae Ionescu.

=== Iorga cabinet and Agrarian Party ===
He was again in charge of Internal Affairs and Finance from 1931 to 1932, during the Iorga government, when he took a harsh stance against the fascist Iron Guard, outlawing it and arresting some of its members (which led to a string of violent confrontations). Argetoianu was hotly contested as Finance Minister: faced with the widespread insolvency of small agricultural holdings in front of the Great Depression, he proposed a form of liquidation that was considered in breach of the 1923 Constitution. Various other issues forced Argetoianu to cease payments of salaries for civil servants at certain intervals, causing far-reaching problems.

The government was voted out of office in the elections of 1932, when Iorga was replaced by Alexandru Vaida-Voevod, a member of the National Peasants' Party (PNŢ) who was himself challenged with solving the agrarian issue; Argetoianu subsequently founded the minor Agrarian Union Party, which, after the National Liberals returned to power with Ion G. Duca, remained a close associate of the king in his competition with traditional forces; when Duca was assassinated by the Iron Guard in the final days of 1933, Argetoianu, together with his former adversary, PNŢ dissident Grigore Iunian, and the National Agrarian Party's Octavian Goga, was probably one of the king's main options in his attempt to create an altogether new political establishment around the camarilla, relying on a compromise with Corneliu Zelea Codreanu (leader of the Iron Guard). Codreanu refused to accept negotiation, but Carol successfully approached the PNL's "young liberals" faction, which came to power with Gheorghe Tătărescu (January 1934).

=== Royal dictatorship and World War II ===
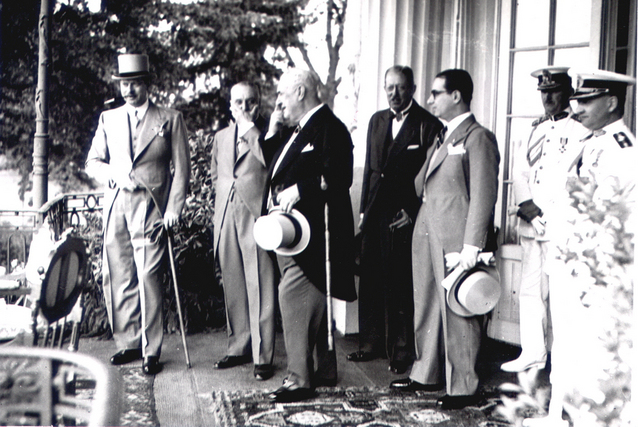
King Carol II (left) and Argetoianu (third person from left to right), 1939

The frequent target of attacks in the Iron Guard press, Argetoianu led his grouping until 1938, when, faced with the unstoppable rise of the Iron Guard, Carol banned all parties and established his National Renaissance Front (FRN).

His own short-lived FRN cabinet, established after that date, was, after Gheorghe Argeşanu's the second in quick succession to the violent clash between the Guard and monarch (after the murder of Armand Călinescu by the former). The Argetoianu government was replaced by that of Tătărescu, who had to deal with the Soviet Union's occupation of Bessarabia and Northern Bukovina and was in turn replaced with Ion Gigurtu (Argetoianu, who remained influential throughout the period, began calling for a rapprochement between Romania and the Soviets).

Carol's regime crumbled after the Second Vienna Award, when Romania had to cede Northern Transylvania to Hungary; it was replaced by the Iron Guard's National Legionary State, which, itself repressed during the previous years, began a campaign of retaliation — like Tătărescu and several others, Argetoianu was kidnapped on 27 November 1940 in the wake of the Jilava massacre, and faced assassination until being rescued by the intervention of Romanian Army officials.

Retreating from public life during World War II and the Ion Antonescu dictatorship (see Romania in World War II), Argetoianu left the country in the spring of 1944, settling in Switzerland. Romania's withdrawal from the Axis in August and the start of Soviet occupation caused him to return in November, seeing an opportunity in the apparent decrease in the appeal of traditional parties and expanding on his vision of Romanian-Soviet cooperation. He was the subject of derision in the National Peasants' Party press (Dreptatea wrote of him: "leading the intrigue in favor of a private property–based communism, a capitalist-based socialism, a mass-free democracy... The country is trustingly placing itself at your disposal. Here are your strings: pull them! Here are your back rooms: maneuver them! Here is your «people»: take it away!").

=== UNMR, arrest, and death ===
Attempting in vain to mediate between the Communists and the PNȚ, Argetoianu was rejected by both sides, and, in January 1947, formed his own grouping — the "National Union for Work and Reconstruction" (Uniunea Națională Muncă și Refacere, UNMR) —, alongside Nicolae Ottescu, Nicolae D. Cornățeanu, Zamfir Brătescu and others. It was kept under surveillance by the Communist-controlled Petru Groza government, and was infiltrated by the pro-Communist "National-Agrarian Action" (Acțiunea Național-Agrară, ANA). The UNMR disbanded over worries that Argetoianu was losing credibility with Soviet authorities—the group around Cornățeanu joined Premier Groza's Ploughmen's Front, while others entered the Union of Patriots.

Argetoianu, who was ill at the time and had just undergone surgery on his prostate, withdrew from public life for a second time. Referring to the commonly-held belief at the time that an American-led invasion of Eastern Europe would topple the Soviet-backed communist government (Vin americanii!), he exclaimed in April 1950, "Even if they came with a wheelbarrow, they would have arrived by now." On the morning of 6 May 1950, he was arrested by the Securitate; while being taken away, he was heard saying: "Man, you sure are tough, you communists, if you are afraid of a flatulent old man such as myself". He died in the infamous Sighet prison five years later, never having been put on trial.

== Legacy ==
In 1999, attorney and civil rights activist Monica Macovei, representing Argetoianu's two granddaughters – Yvonne Oroveanu Niculescu and Constantina "Dina" Oroveanu – before court cleared Argetoianu of all charges, with prosecutor Mihai Carp admitting that Argetoianu's detention had been an abuse.

A street in his native city, Craiova, is named after him, and so is a school in Argetoaia, Dolj County.
