= Michael Longaker =

Plastic surgeon

Michael T. Longaker
- Awards: Society of University Surgeons Lifetime Achievement Award
- Scientific career
- Institutions: Stanford Diabetes Research Center (2018-)

Michael T. Longaker is an American medical researcher and board-certified plastic surgeon. He has been a member of the Stanford Diabetes Research Center since 2018. He is the Deane P. and Louise Mitchell Professor for Plastic and Reconstructive Surgery, and by courtesy a Professor of Materials Science and Engineering.

He is a co-founder of the medical research venture capital fund TauTona Group, as well as of biotechnology companies Arresto Biosciences and Neodyne Biosciences.

== Education ==
Longaker attended Michigan State University and Harvard Medical School. After obtaining degrees at both schools, he went on to become a resident at the University of California, San Francisco. He studied wound healing in the unborn fetus under Michael R. Harrison.

At Michigan State, he was on the 1977-78, 1978-79, and 1979–80 Michigan State Spartans men's basketball team, where he played as a guard.

== Career ==
Longaker has worked in research on organ development, but has been more involved in the science of wound healing since the 1990s.
