= Romanian Front =

Romanian Front Frontul Românesc
- President: Alexandru Vaida-Voevod
- Founded: March 12, 1935
- Dissolved: March 30, 1938
- Split from: National Peasants' Party (PNȚ)
- Succeeded by: National Renaissance Front (FRN)
- Headquarters: Elisabeta Boulevard 8, Bucharest
- Newspaper: Gazeta Transilvaniei; Frontul Românesc; Ofensiva Română
- Paramilitary wing: Panduri
- Ideology: Fascism; Monarchism
- Political position: Far-right
- National affiliation: National Bloc (1935–1936)
- Colours: Black

The Romanian Front (Romanian: Frontul Românesc, FR) was a fascist party created in Romania in 1935. Led by former Prime Minister Alexandru Vaida-Voevod, it originated as a right-wing splinter group from the mainstream National Peasants' Party (PNȚ). While in power, Vaida had an ambiguous approach to the Iron Guard, and constructed his own radical ideology; the FR had a generally xenophobic program of positive discrimination, being implicitly (and eventually explicitly) antisemitic. It was subsumed to the policies of King Carol II, maneuvering between the mainstream National Liberals, the PNȚ's left-wing, and the more radically fascist Guardists. Vaida tried to compete with the former two and appease the latter, assuming fascist trappings such as the black-shirted uniform. Like the Guard, he supported aligning Romania with the Axis powers, though he also hoped to obtain their guarantees for Greater Romania's borders. The FR's lower echelons included Viorel Tilea and other opponents of Vaida's approach, who believed in Romania's attachments to the League of Nations and the Little Entente.

Albeit invested with the king's trust and counting experienced politicians among its cadres, the FR was always a minor force in Romanian politics, and was habitually defeated in by-elections. Its peak influence was recorded during the local elections of June 1937, when it emerged as the second most popular party in Ilfov County. Early on, it was courted by other radical groups, narrowly failing to absorb the National Agrarian Party. It came to depend on the more powerful National Christian Party, with which it formed a political alliance in 1935. Called "National Bloc", it too failed to produce a full merger between its components, as Vaida had qualms about the unchecked Germanophilia of his partners; his Romanianization project was also regarded as too mild by National Christian standards. In later years, the FR made several sustained efforts to reunite with, or to absorb, the "centrist" wing of the PNȚ.

The FR's hostility toward successive National Liberal governments gave way to cooperation after the latter also embraced ethnic discrimination. This rapprochement eventually resulted in a cartel, formed by the two parties during the 1937 general election. This controversial move bled the FR of members and supporters, including a massive defection by D. R. Ioanițescu and his supporters. After the country witnessed a descent into political violence with clashes between monarch and the Guardists, the Front allowed itself to be absorbed into Carol's sole legal party, the National Renaissance Front in 1938. From 1940, Vaida served as the Front's Chairman.

== History ==
=== Origins ===
The Front had its roots in the second and third governments of Vaida-Voevod (1932 and 1933), which were characterized by growing levels of antisemitism and discussions regarding the possibility of barring Jews from a number of public posts (Jewish quotas). As an ideologue shaped by the Transylvanian school of nationalism, Vaida-Voevod found inspiration in the work of economic antisemites and authoritarians such as Karl Lueger and Aurel Popovici. In the late 1920s, his views were shaped by eugenics and biopolitics, leading him to demand the state-managed preservation of a pure peasant stock, against "biological competition". The antisemitic measures were taken to the background of agitation by another homegrown fascist movement, the Iron Guard, which Vaida-Voevod had initially protected and supported in his terms as Interior Minister (from 1928). Specifically against the Guard and other violent organizations, Vaida-Voevod passed laws limiting political freedoms and establishing curfews (although he allowed the Transylvanian Saxons to form Sturmabteilung units which targeted Jews).

Vaida was in turn attacked by the Guardist press as a "Freemason", even though, Vaida claimed, his attachment to the Lodge was purely formal and instrumental. This issue had been highlighted during the 1920s by A. C. Cuza's National-Christian Defense League (LANC). According to its manifestos, "the Freemason Vaida" had acquiesced to the Minority Treaties, which "delivered us, arms tied, legs tied, to the Kikes". Another accusation brought up against Vaida was his partnership in Jewish-owned businesses, in particular the Marmorosch Blank Bank. In defending himself and reclaiming a similar discourse, Vaida argued that his brief experience with the Lodge had cemented in him the belief that Masons were "Jewified".

Rival politicians regarded Vaida as a man who secretly cultivated the Guard, and who thus refrained from intensifying its persecution. This accusation was voiced by Gheorghe Beza, Armand Călinescu, Victor Iamandi and Victor Moldovan. At the time, Vaida had emerged as the leader of a distinct, radical-right, faction of the PNȚ. He backed the increasingly authoritarian King Carol II, while the moderates, under Iuliu Maniu, supported liberal democracy, calling the right-wing "extra-constitutional". For his part, Vaida wanted the group purged of remnants from the old Peasants' Party. Party unity was maintained courtesy of Maniu's Transylvanian supporters, including a centrist group led by Zaharia Boilă and Corneliu Coposu.

Writing at the time, the left-wing radical journalist Petre Constantinescu-Iași claimed that the conflict also reflected differences in global orientation: Maniu's Francophile support base against Vaida's Anglo–Germanophilia. The latter, he proposed, was aiming for "the complete, vigorous and definitive, fascization" of Romania. Vaida still viewed himself as a moderate Francophile, chiding other figures for being in complete "subservience to France"; he also rejected the League of Nations as a "spawn of the Jews". Overall, he declared his sympathy for André Tardieu and his French conservatism. His praise for a "Christian France" puzzled commentators, who noted that this political culture no longer existed in the form imagined by Vaida, or that it was reduced to the "invalid" Croix-de-Feu. Following the German election of March 1933, the Premier played down the Nazi Party's victory and its significance for antisemitic agitation in Romania. Addressing the Romanian public on May 10, he declared that Adolf Hitler's social program was less advanced than what the PNȚ had to offer. He also referred to the LANC as an older, "wiser", and more "adaptable" version of Hitler's movement.

By November 1933, the two wings of the PNȚ were fighting each other out in the open, notably so at a riot in Sibiu. The king encouraged such dissent, hoping to weaken his rivals, but also finding that Vaida-Voevod's politics were largely compatible with his own. Nevertheless, the government found it hard to tackle the effects of the Great Depression, and was brutal in its handling of the Grivița workers' strike. The growing rift inside the government party, but also evidence of the Prime Minister's complicity with the Guard, caused additional dissatisfaction among sections of the electorate. The cabinet ultimately fell when the PNȚ's left-wing published a pamphlet against the king, which the latter used as a pretext for demanding Vaida-Voevod's resignation.

The National Liberal Party (PNL), imposing itself on the king with the threat of "civic resistance", was returned to power, and Ion G. Duca became prime minister. In late 1933, Duca, who organized a clampdown against the Guard and was assassinated by one of its death squads, and the cabinet came to be led by Gheorghe Tătărescu. In the wake of the killing, Vaida spoke favorably of Iron Guard men who were on trial for sedition. He also alleged that the murder was somehow tied to Duca's inner-party rivalry with Iamandi, an allegation that Iamadi dismissed as "incoherent and illogical". Vaida was presumed to be insincere when crediting such rumors: according to Beza's account, Codreanu distanced himself from the team of assassins only after Vaida advised him to do so.

=== Emergence ===
Vaida's dissidence was immediately useful for the king: it absorbed Maniu's attention and toned down PNȚ attempts to restore the constitutional order. According to historian Petre Țurlea, Vaida was "supported by the king, though not as much as he would have liked". Increasingly marginalized by his party colleagues, in January 1934 Vaida announced that he would not resign, but "waited to be thrown out". He also threatened that his ouster would come with "fireworks". His lead was followed by Viorel Tilea and Eduard Mirto, both of whom attacked Maniu in private conversations or in public speeches. During February, the various PNȚ factions made a final attempt at reconciliation, with their leaders meeting at Bistrița.

Tătărescu returned at the helm of a new cabinet, despite Vaida's hopes that the king would prefer an alliance of the far-right parties, including his own faction. Over the following months, Vaida tested Maniu's resolve by instigating another conflict in Timiș-Torontal County. Supported by the PNȚ newspaper Țara, he fought for the local party presidency against Maniu's favorite, Sever Bocu. Vaida was able to win the seat in June, but, at a September summit in Sovata, the PNȚ decided to depose him. Attempting to regain control of the electoral base, Vaida took up radicalism in the social sphere as well, promising peasants that he would bring about a new land reform. These policies got him expelled from the PNȚ in early 1935, leaving that party to be controlled by left-wing agrarianists.

The "xenophobic and antidemocratic", "antisemitic radical right-wing", Romanian Front was born from this split. It began to function in April 1935 (officially: on March 12), declaring itself ready to serve the king's wishes, and counting on support from traditional PNȚ voters to become the catch-all far-right group. By mid March, when his speech at Oradea drew in an "immense attendance", Vaida-Voevod had organized "separate Vaidist sections" in 60 counties. The split exasperated other PNȚ wings, and resulted in more clashes: the National Peasantist paramilitary guard, or Voinici, staged an attack on Vaida's newspaper, Gazeta Transilvaniei. By 1937, the Front had set up another Transylvanian newspaper, called Ofensiva Română and published from Cluj. Vaidists took over the PNȚ newspaper of Constanța, Aurora Dobrogei, and founded their own regional organs: Basarabia Creștină (Chișinău), Biruința (Botoșani), and Chemarea Noastră (Ismail). At Piatra Neamț, N. Borș put out the affiliate paper Frontul Românesc Neamț.

The new party included Vaida's two sons, Aurel and Mircea, alongside Tilea, Sever Dan, Virgil Potârcă, and Voicu Nițescu. Gheorghe Mironescu (himself a former PNȚ prime minister) became a founding member on March 15, 1935, when he published an open letter supporting Vaida. The PNȚ then shunned him as an enemy of "peasant democracy". A while after, the FR registered in its ranks a prominent PNL defector, Constantin Angelescu. A wave of disgruntled PNȚ cadres also signed up for the FR, including Mirto, Aurel Vlad, D. R. Ioanițescu, and Gheorghe Ionescu-Sisești. The Orăștie chapter, organized by Vlad, included the nationalist priest Ioan Moța. Other PNȚ colleagues from Vaida's native Transylvania also joined the FR; major figures include Emil Hațieganu, Dionisie Roman, Gavril Iuga, and Teodor Bohățiel. The Front's branch in Brașov County, supervised by Nițescu, also had among its members Victor Braniște and Iosif Blaga.

On April 20, 1935 the FR established its own group in the lower chamber. On that day, five deputies of the Peasants' Party–Lupu, including Ioan Modreanu of Someș, Mihai Isăcescu of Constanța, and Alex. D. Rotta of Cetatea Albă, affiliated with "Vaidism". Other members of note were Savian Bădulescu (former Mayor of Bucharest), Coriolan Baltă, Ion Buzdugan, Romulus Cândea, and Ioan Gr. Periețeanu. The Front's section in Dolj was established by a former PNȚ deputy, Nicolae C. Iovipale; the one in neighboring Gorj, which is attested from October 1935, was run by Adrian Brudariu, who split his activity between Gorj and Timiș-Torontal. For the previous two years, Brudariu had led a minor, and nominally left-wing, Independent Peasantist Party. The FR was soon joined by professors such as George Moroianu and Mihai Șerban, and had an active cell at the University of Iași, under Petre Dragomirescu. Author N. Porsenna was also a member by mid 1936.

Estimates suggest that only some 10% or 15% of PNȚ cadres followed Vaida. The group recruited among newcomers to politics: in late 1937, Tilea, as leader of the FR's Sibiu County branch, welcomed Generals Spiridon Mihăilescu and Ștefan Orescovici into its ranks. Overall, in the academic world, some 10 professionals rallied with the FR. This was ahead of the Guard, but well below other parties on the right. The schism actually contributed to disciplining the National Peasantist elites: emerging as the new party president, but feeling threatened by Maniu's potential return, Ion Mihalache hinted that he would expel the entire Transylvanian wing at any sign of revolt. The FR claimed that the "Masonic" establishment was also sabotaging its influence within both Romanian churches, Eastern Orthodox and Eastern Catholic. According to Vaida, Orthodox Patriarch Miron Cristea and Cluj Bishop Iuliu Hossu were both sympathizers of the Front.

Notable figures of the Front
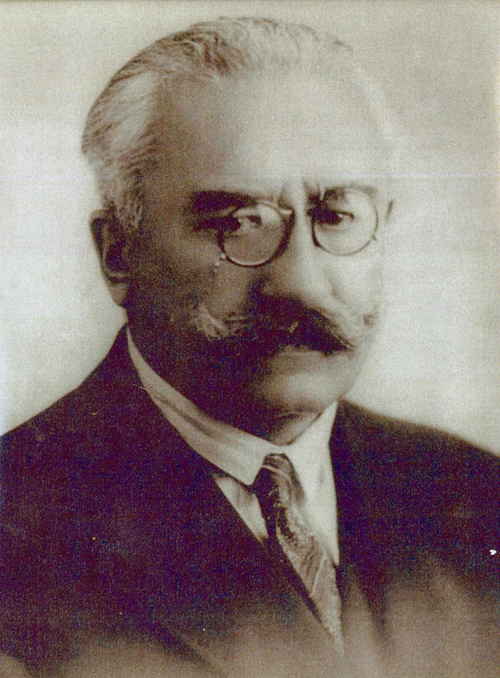
Alexandru Vaida-Voevod (1930s)

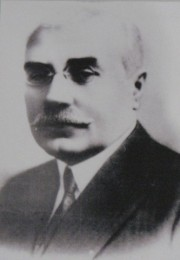
Constantin Angelescu (ca. 1933)

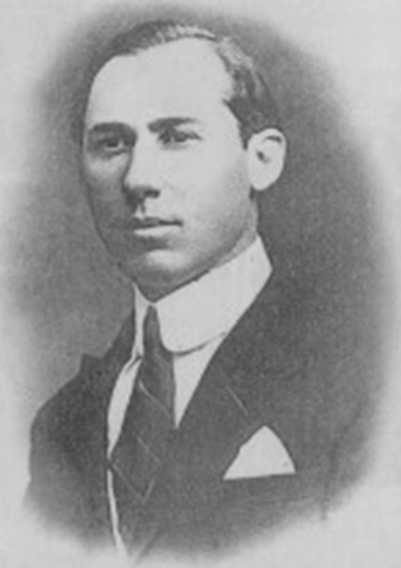
Ion Buzdugan (1920s)

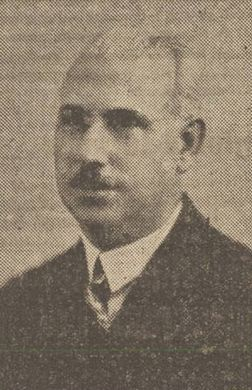
D. R. Ioanițescu (1933)

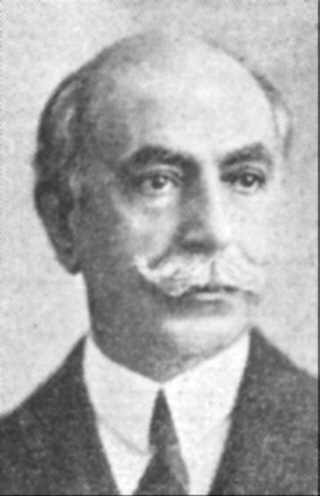
Gheorghe Mironescu (ca. 1932)

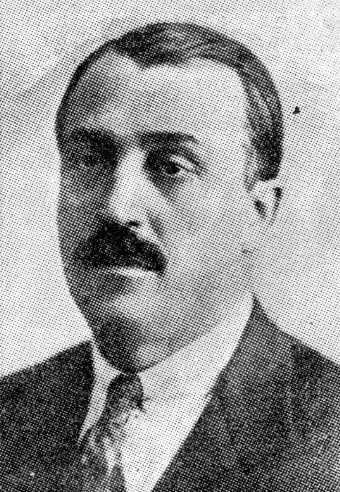
Eduard Mirto (1932)

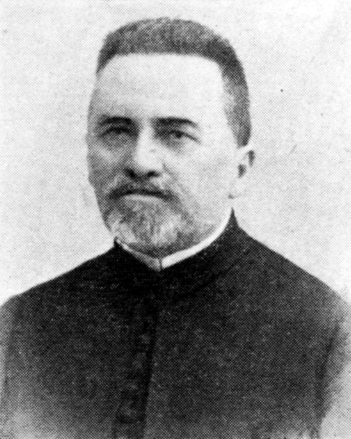
Ioan Moța (ca. 1930)

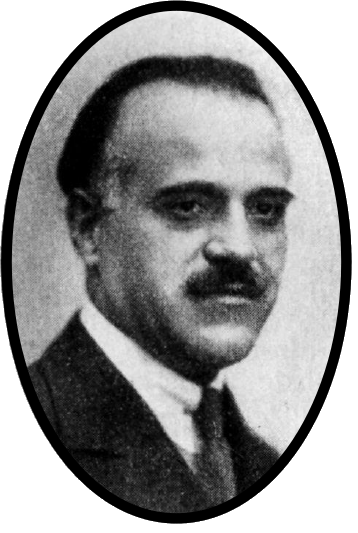
Voicu Nițescu (1933)

=== Vaida's platform ===
==== Main tenets ====
The FR is often assumed to have been insincere or vague about its political radicalism—or, according to Iamandi, simply "chaotic". Analysts have dubbed it a "semi-fascist" or "profascist" party, one undecided about whether to support a fully-fledged dictatorship or a milder "national democracy". One theory is that the FR was born from collusion between Vaida, Carol, and Police chief Gavrilă Marinescu, as an attempt to divide and subdue the extremist vote. The party program dictated that elections were the cause of Romania's political problems, and therefore operated on the "authoritative criterion", including the nomination of the party elite "by the supreme leader"; the cadres were only entrusted with "deepening the penetration of the ideology [...] among the masses". Vaida, who declared publicly that he had in him "a spark from Hitler's soul", imitated Italian fascism, Nazism, and the Guard itself at a primarily visual and declarative level. The authoritarian party leader, saluted by his followers with chants of Ura Vaida ("Hurrah for Vaida"), commanded over a network of watches, centuriae, and legions, with a political uniform consisting of black shirts. From June 1935, the Front's chapter in Constanța County also had a youth paramilitary wing, called Panduri (in honor of the 1821 Wallachian rebels).

One of the main points of FR policy was Vaida-Voevod's idea of minority quotas, which he termed the numerus Valachicus: the share in economy and culture "in proportion to [the Romanians'] ethnic number." One left-wing columnist at Lupta suggested that some of Vaida's own followers were "stunned" by its discriminatory undertones, and had to accommodate it with their "personal obligation" toward Vaida; another columnist argued that some of "Mr Vaida's partisans [had been] ardent and committed philosemites" until 1934. Shaped by such new imperatives, the FR program emphasized that "there must be no policy of hatred towards the minorities", adding: "an end must be put to the privileged situation resulting from the past." As noted in 1935 by the Bulgarian-Romanian paper Dobrudzhanski Glas, the proposal effectively meant that the FR could never recruit members from among the minorities. Reportedly, in mid 1935 the FR attempted a rapprochement with the Jewish Party, which was notoriously opposed to Jewish assimilation. An assimilationist Jewish leader, Wilhelm Filderman, suggested that Vaida was producing messages calling for "collaboration" with exponents of right-wing Zionism, while he "condemns the Regat's Jews for joining [mainstream Romanian] political parties."

Numerus Valachicus replicated Guardist tactics, but did so in a positive discrimination manner, one not ostensibly antisemitic. However, Gazeta Transilvaniei put our numerous articles which concentrated on maligning Jewish "colonialists", claiming for instance that they controlled 80% of Romania's industry, with firms it described as "parasitical". Calculations by the Front's press had it that Jews and Hungarians were overrepresented in the liquor business: although Romanians made up a majority of retailers, their suppliers were still largely non-Romanian. Overall, radical antisemites were reserved about Vaidist proposals. The Iron Guard's "Captain", Corneliu Zelea Codreanu, wrote that: "if Vaida was ever antisemitic, he was one of the old school". During that interval, the Guard's intellectuals also gave mixed reactions to the FR's antisemitic program. Sociologist Traian Brăileanu cautiously commended the FR for wanting to break away from "kike imperialism" and "kike finance", while philosopher Nae Ionescu referred to the numerus Valachicus as "a platform for agitation, not at all a political program."

Within the political mainstream, the numerus advocacy was seen as exaggerated, but not unworkable. As acknowledged by Vaida himself, Maniu was vexed by educational quotas, but favored curbing the influence of "foreigners" and adopting trust-busting legislation. Other figures were more skeptical of the program. Dante Gherman, a People's Party supporter, argued that the economic over-representation of minorities was not a matter to be addressed new laws, but simply required old laws being properly enforced. As noted at the time by Vaida's rival, Constantin Argetoianu, the issue of enforced discrimination was paradoxical, since minorities were largely absent from the state apparatus; introducing quotas would have meant "opening up such careers to a significant number of Jews." That practical matter did not dissuade the "scoundrels of our cities", "the Jew-eaters and extollers of racism", from campaigning around the concept. However, Vaida viewed Argetoianu as a marginal ally. Within the FR itself, Potârcă also objected to Vaida's ideas on ethnic protection, viewing them as exaggerated. When bar associations began voting their own "Romanianization", the FR's Iovipale criticized a complete purge, proposing that up to 4% of the legal practices could still go to non-Romanians. Among Hungarian conservatives, Miklós Bánffy predicted that the FR would never act on its threats, since Romania's population was "so very decent"; as noted by Bánffy, Romanians would not even chase dogs away from a sidewalk, let alone minorities from their workplaces.

The group was otherwise compatible with the Iron Guard: both were seen by Guard sympathizer Petre Țuțea as exponents of the "revolutionary right", destined to blend together into "a single party or a state party." As noted by his colleague Mihail Sebastian, Ionescu took part in agitating for Vaida, and argued that the Front's alliance with the Guard and their common victory over Tătărescu were still inevitable. Monarchist writer Ion Sân-Giorgiu claimed that Ionescu was sponsoring the FR with money that ultimately originated in Nazi Germany, and actively trying to create tensions between Vaida and Carol. Allegedly, Ionescu also intervened to save the FR's Mirto when the latter was found to be running a smuggling business.

==== Socioeconomics ====
In his speeches, Vaida declared that fascism was primarily a natural development of the "national-social ideas"; he claimed primordiality for Romanian nationalism, which, he believed, had been jolted into existence by the Transylvanian revolt of 1784. The Front's spokesman, Ioan Alexandru Bran-Lemeny, declared the party to be pragmatic rather than ideological, noting that it did not deal in "abstraction"—and that Maniu's belief in the "peasant state" was a "hybrid, unworkable construct". Bran-Lemeny acknowledged instead that his group disapproved of "some methods employed by German national-socialism", but challenged his adversaries to view fascism and Nazism as more economically efficient than liberalism. Another such plea was issued by FR member C. I. Odor, who argued that "Romanian organization", modeled on Nazism, fascism, and the Estado Novo, would triumph against "alienism, above all [against] Judaism". While he exercised supreme command within the FR, Vaida conceded that the state needed to be placed under the "proud king" with his sweeping powers; he chided Maniu for favoring a crowned republic.

Numerus Valachicus was thus seen by the FR's leader as a pathway to a reformed and regimented society. The party pledged that, if appointed Governor of the National Bank of Romania, Angelescu would be in a position to redirect credit only toward Romanian-dominated enterprises. Vaida claimed that he was merely fulfilling his old agenda, arguing that, in places such as the Banat Romanians could only find employment doing menial labor. He then argued that the effects of his approach could be observed in the experiment of Leghia, where a Romanian entrepreneur, Mihail Manoilescu, had taken over control of a "Jewish" mine, then restaffed it with Romanian engineers. Proclaiming that "capital and labour must be subservient to the superior object of the Nation", the party program also looked to "the selection of the best elements among the children of the race" to take place within the school system.

The process of instituting ethnic protectionism would contribute to the emergence of a "really (biologically) national state", the "national organic State" (which "must be a Constitutional Monarchy"), with "the abolition of all class war". One variant sketched out in FR circles was social corporatism, as popularized by Ioanițescu through his own magazine, Drum Nou. According to political scientist Victor Rizescu, this vision had been forged in left-liberal circles, before undergoing an appropriation by the nationalist right. Ioanițescu further proposed that mandatory spending and protective tariffs could be used to favor infant industries and model consumption. This protectionism was not extended into debt relief for the peasantry: among FR members, Vlad stood out for opposing such measures, noting that they would incapacitate the credit unions of Transylvania.

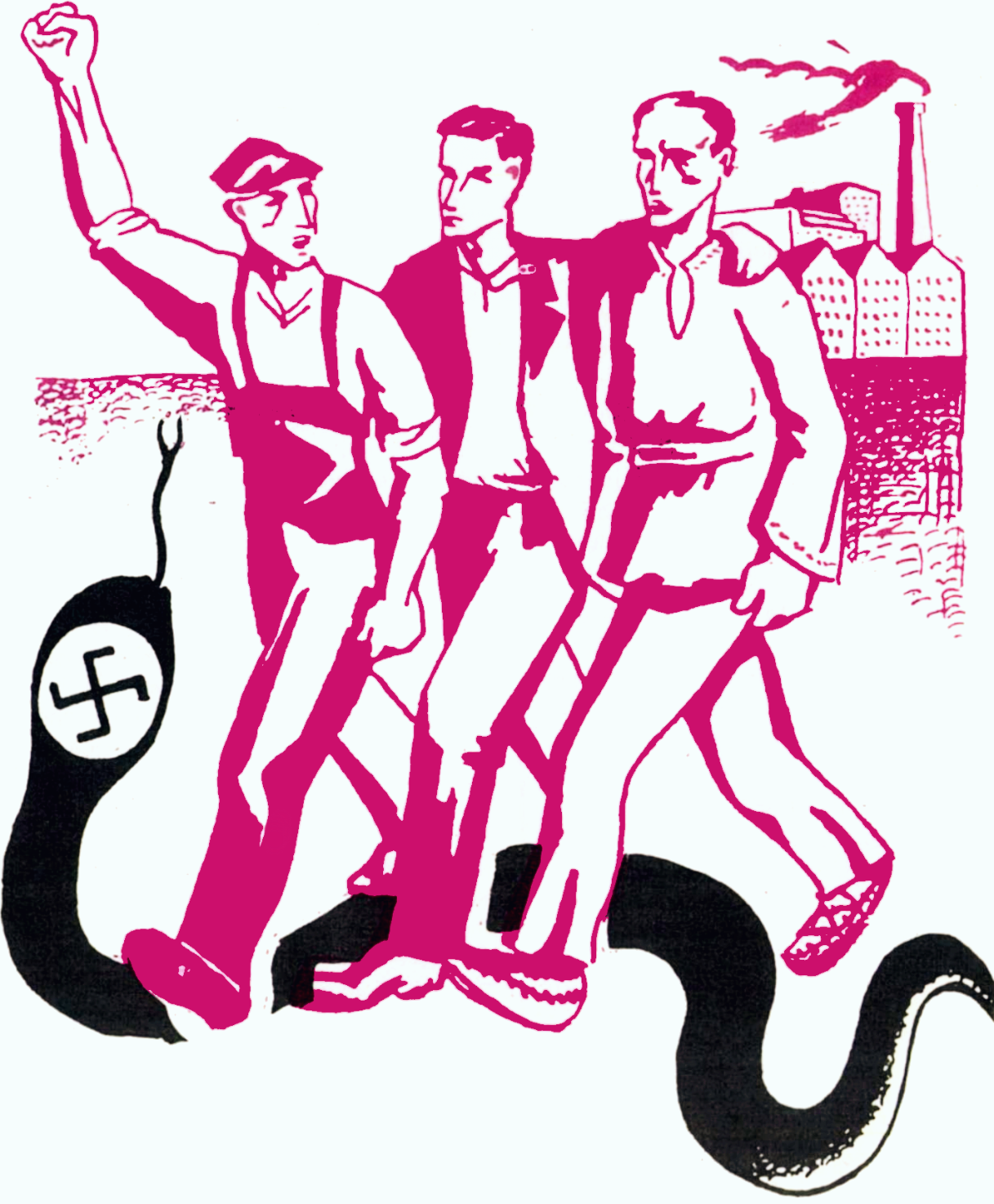
Depiction of the popular front against fascism (including a peasant figure), in a Cuvântul Liber cartoon of 1935

Upon creating the FR, Vaida declared his opposition to agrarian socialism and the cooperative movement as ideals embraced by the PNȚ's left-wing. Speaking for this current, Țara de Mâine journal argued that he was committing "political suicide" by turning his back on the "peasant uplift". Cooperatist doctrinaire Victor Jinga additionally noted that the FR leader had shown his political incompetence by building himself a large manor in Olpret, while its "purely Romanian" villagers were living in "indescribable squalor". The FR was similarly castigated by the left-wing essayist Constantin Prisnea, who argued that Guardism and Vaidism were "duping the youth with 'ideology', which is nothing other than the very demolition of Romanian cultural values".

Vaida also stated his radical anticommunism which, as historian Armin Heinen writes, "clashed bizarrely with the actual insignificance of the Communist Party." In at least one instance, he equated democracy itself with "the left [and] all its parade of revolutionary ideas, its free propaganda in favor of kolkhozes, its portraits of Stalin everywhere on display". Ever since the 1910s, Gazeta Transilvaniei had endorsed the conspiracy theory of "Jewish Bolshevism", enhanced after 1935 by allegations that the Jewish community was entirely subordinate to the Comintern; it also claimed that mainstream Labor Zionist groups such as HeHalutz were in reality champions of communism. A series of articles in Basarabia Creștină argued that Bessarabia had been the original target for settlement by the Jewish Colonization Association, and was still being "undermined" by "agrarian kikes". FR papers expressed sympathy with the Arab Revolt, arguing that Zionists represented a nation that "is gleefully being expelled from all countries of the world."

In conjunction with this theory, Vaida circulated allegations that the PNȚ left, which was in contact with the Communist Party, was also financed by, and forever indebted to, the "Jewish minority". Communists such as Constantinescu-Iași reciprocated Vaida's sentiments, calling the FR part of the "black warmongers' bloc" and of "the fascist peril". Gazeta congratulated Craiova's prosecutors who obtained a conviction for communist Ana Pauker in 1936, citing this as a victory for "Romanian solidarity" against "foreign emissaries". Nonetheless, Pauker's defense team included Mircea Lepădătescu, who was both a leading FR cadre and a contact for Dolj's Marxist study circles.

=== Nationalist Bloc ===
Despite official backing and circumstantial supporters, the Front failed to prosper, and was always a "frail party". As noted by Heinen: "Within just a few weeks, it became clear that Vaida could not fulfill the hopes invested in him [by the king]." On May 15, 1935, an FR meeting at Vox Hall in Bucharest gathered some 5,000 spectators, though, reportedly, many of them were delegated by the Iron Guard. The first electoral test was a by-election in Prahova, where the FR only managed 6,000 votes, well below the PNL and PNȚ. In the June by-elections for the Senate seat at Mehedinți, Vaida himself obtained less than 3,000 votes. One contributing factor was that Premier Tătărescu himself introduced some laws implicitly aimed against the Jewish community, whilst also seeking to deliberately contain the FR and other radical groups. The FR could still boast a strong presence in Guardist-dominated regions such as Câmpulung Moldovenesc, where its senator, Dumitru Tinu, ran a successful consumer cooperative.

In early 1935, Vaida was interested in toning down the perception of his party as a Carlist puppet. For this reason, he negotiated a rapprochement with the anti-Carol Constitutional Front, formed by Gheorghe Brătianu and Alexandru Averescu. Reportedly, in April 1935 Vaida had asked that the king's influential mistress, Elena Lupescu, be forced into exile, although his colleague Mirto was still widely perceived as a member of Lupescu's camarilla. The National Agrarian Party (PNA), headed by Vaida's old rival Octavian Goga, also approached the Front with offers of alliance or merger. Reportedly, Goga offered to fuse his group into the FR, only demanding the position of Vice President; Vaida refused, since he had promised that role to Vlad.

The FR's wish to create a "strong nationalist pole" also drove it into negotiations with Carlist supporters on the extreme right. Its first partners were the LANC, in particular its youth wing, and a more minor Iron Guard splinter group, the Crusade of Romanianism. On May 16, it was rumored that the FR would absorb both the LANC and the PNA: "Vaida will be the president of the Romanian Front, Goga will be his vice president, and Cuza will be offered the honorary presidency." However, the FR and the LANC were irreconcilable over Vaida's numerus Valachicus doctrines. Cuza wrote at the time that Vaida's system of quotas, "instead of signifying the defense of Romanian elements, will bring about the complete extinction of [our] ideal, 'Romania for the Romanians'." Around August 1935, the Front was reportedly negotiating a merger with I. V. Emilian's "Fire Swastika", which had broken out of the LANC. Vaida's antisemitic ideology also won him the endorsement from Colonel Ștefan Tătărescu, brother of the Premier and former leader of the Romanian National Socialists. They signed a pact, which allowed Vaida's followers focused on campaigning in Transylvania and the Banat; Col. Tătărescu was taking primacy in all other regions, as head of the Numerus Valachicus National Movement.

Clashes with the PNȚ were still reported during that interval: in October 1935, the Sighet home of a Vaidist was reportedly attacked by a PNȚ crew under Ilie Lazăr. Shots were fired during the scuffle, leaving Lazăr wounded in the arm. By then, the FR was negotiating an alliance with the more powerful National Christian Party (PNC), which had resulted, with Carol's blessing, from the LANC's merger with the PNA. In August 1935, the new FR newspaper, also titled Frontul Românesc, announced that the two groups would only agree on a "minimal platform" for government, with fusion only occurring "naturally and automatically" at some point in the future; from the PNC side, Goga put out a similarly cautious message.

Together, the PNC and the FR established a Nationalist Bloc, the second-largest coalition in Parliament (after the PNL's). The PNC leader, Goga, welcomed Vaida as a fellow combatant "for the national cause." Nevertheless, the alliance saw PNC activists such as Nichifor Crainic, whose radical ethnocratic program was rejected by Vaida-Voevod, leaving in protest. By November 1935, Maniu and the PNȚ had grown fearful of this rapprochement, noting that it could produce an electoral sweep by "the right". The FR still discussed a merger with the PNC, but advanced talks exposed other fundamental disagreements between the two sides. Reportedly, Vaida was upset by the PNC's foreign policy, which openly celebrated revanchism and German re-armament. Carol was enthusiastic about the promised merger, which he hoped would give him a "strong party of the right" to control. In early January 1936, Vaida announced that fusion was no longer being sought, and also that the FR would not field candidates in any partial elections scheduled for that year; demoralized by what he saw as Carol's machinations, he declared his intention to withdraw from politics. Despite renewed efforts by the king, a complete merger between the two parties again failed to materialize, and, to the Guard's stated satisfaction, both the PNC and the FR experienced major internal dissension.

=== Stagnation ===
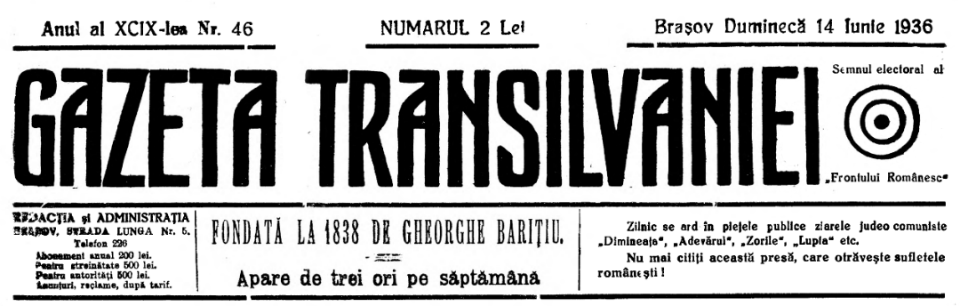
Nameplate of Gazeta Transilvaniei on June 14, 1936, with FR logo and a condemnation of the "Judaeo-communist" press, including Adevărul

At that stage, the FR moved closer to the Guard. Vaida was a guest of honor at the Guard's student congress, held at Târgu Mureș in March 1936. In April, he made a stop at Iași, where an Aromanian man confronted him, "ask[ing] Mr Vaida that he spare no violence toward enacting his program." Vaida was upset by this take, replying: "I will never resort to violence in applying our program." During May, he and Mironescu had private meetings with the Guard, hoping to persuade its leaders to renounce also violent methods. Contrarily, in his interviews with Carol, Vaida voiced his praise toward the Guard, while shunning the PNC. He and Carol agreed that the Guardists needed to be coaxed and kept away from reaching an understanding with Maniu.

Meanwhile, Vaida had caused a national controversy by visiting Timișoara and declaring a radical agenda in terms of foreign policy. This included demands that France "stay out of our internal politics", and unprecedented territorial claims on the Kingdom of Yugoslavia (in respect to Vojvodina). He declared that the League of Nations was powerless against the "victorious discipline" of the Italian Empire and the Hitlerian "unity of sentiment and willpower". During that time, he increased his pressures on the party base, hoping to accelerate its paramilitary transformation. This effort sparked revolt among the FR sections in Brăila County, whose leaders Anastase Petrescu and Marin Panait handed in their resignations.

A reshuffled Tătărescu government took over in mid-1936. The Front still held its large rallies, boasting that 20,000 affiliates heard Ioanițescu speaking at Galați in March. However, according to the regional journal Viața Ardealului, summer 1936 was a "period of stagnation" for the FR and "the nationalist current as a whole". The Front was still "sure of its destiny", but "organizing in depth" and keeping secret about it. Vaida and Angelescu now advanced the notion of a PNȚ–FR reconciliation, arguing that it could successfully bring down the PNL cabinet. By late August, rumors had emerged that the FR was considering an alliance with the PNC and Argetoianu's Agrarian Union Party. News of this reached the FR's former allies in the Crusade of Romanianism, who noted that such alliances were being engineered by the local Freemasonry; according to the Crusaders, Vaida's nationalism was in fact revealed to have been "driven by the international Masonic mafia." One other option, advanced by Carol and journalist Pamfil Șeicaru, was for the FR to join efforts with the breakaway Radical Peasants' Party (PRȚ). The latter was at the time clarifying its anti-Vaidist position, calling out the FR squads as "criminal gangs".

Meanwhile, revelations about German re-armament, pushed the FR closer to Nazism. In June, following the Rhineland crisis, L'Humanité reported that the "racist parties" (the Front, the Iron Guard and the PNC) staged a march outside the French embassy in Bucharest, with chants of "Long live Hitler!" With this, Vaida declared that Germany was marching toward realizing the Anschluss, pleading for France to discard its Popular Front and rejoin the "nationalist" camp. In response, Lupta noted that Vaida was not up to date on French politics: the Popular Front had "proceeded to destroy all Jewish capitalists and bankers", whereas Vaida's personal idol, François de La Rocque, had attended at least one memorial service in a synagogue. Vaida's optimism was also castigated by Conservative Party leader Grigore Filipescu, who warned Vaida that his other idol, Benito Mussolini, was an opportunist, and that "Mussolinism has no Vaidist sympathies."

Speaking at Oradea in October, Vaida saluted both Axis powers. According to Vaida, the Locarno Treaties were naturally obsolete, and Germany was right to ignore them; however, he cautioned that the borders of Greater Romania needed to be guaranteed by both Germany and France. This stance was ridiculed by the PNȚ youth: in a September communique, it noted that Vaida, "that old fascist parrot", was silent on the issue of Italian support for Hungarian irredentism, though this would have entailed the loss of Transylvania to Hungary. From the PNȚ's left, Nicolae L. Lupu described the FR as stoking "racial [and] Germanophile violence"; in response, the FR played down such incidents as "the excesses of certain youths", while noting brawls started by the PNȚ's own Voinici. In November, as Mussolini expressed full support for a Hungarian expansion, Vaida joined other Romanian politicians in voicing his indignation. He and his party sought to tone down the "hysteria", informing their partisans that Mussolini would never risk going to war over Hungarian demands in Transylvania. Vaidists pledged themselves to combat propaganda by the Hungarian Unity Party, arguing that it "falsifies the most obvious truths". The FR also noted that Mihalache's anti-revisionism was a diversion used by communist and Jewish infiltrators.

On September 4, the FR and PNC had agreed on another collaboration, and presented a single list for the local elections of that year. The PNȚ alleged that the two parties also unified their political militias. It described a case in Baia County, where two priests, Hreamătă and Dăscălescu, respectively led the Lăncieri and Vaidist "gangs", which coordinated with each other in assaulting their political opponents. Brătianu's Georgist Liberal Party also collaborated with the two parties in places such as Brașov; though invited to join this "purely Romanian list", the PNȚ declined. In Ilfov County, the two-party list was headed by Ioanițescu, with the PNC man Stan Ghițescu taking the second eligible seat. The Front's registered logo, "two concentric circles and a dot", doubled as the alliance symbol. Called "target" or "wheel" in party documents, this drawing symbolized Greater Romania as an outside circle, and, within, "the belt strap tightening around The Black Dot, namely the xenophile". According to Gazeta Transilvaniei, the symbolism was poorly understood by illiterate sympathizers, who mistakenly voted with the PNȚ's circle (which had been intensely popularized by Ioanițescu before his defection).

=== Electoral failure and PNȚ rapprochement ===
FR performance during the local elections of June 1937

A November 1937 piece in Lupta noted that there was a simmering conflict opposing "centrists" such as Vaida and Angelescu to the PNC-aligned Ioanițescu and Nițescu. On New Year's Day 1937, Vaida sent a telegram to La Rocque and his French Social Party, which stated: "May God grant that our two countries can successfully fight for their shared ideals of peace, respect for family, and work, freely and honestly." La Roque replied, expressing his similar wishes for the "Romanian and French sister nations"; the FR celebrated this exchange as the inauguration of a direct relationship between "nationalist France" and "nationalist Romania". According to the Jewish magazine Új Kelet, Vaida was conspicuously the "great favorite" for the post of prime minister, and could afford to ignore offers of collaboration from the PNC.

Over the following months, the FR was effectively marginalized: in March 1937, Tătărescu banned the FR's black insignia and uniforms, alongside those of other paramilitary movements (including the Guard and the PNC). Early 1937 saw rumors of a tentative co-operation between Vaida and the PNȚ, which was still chaired by Mihalache. According to various outlets, Vaida had ordered his propagandists to only focus criticism on Maniu, while Tilea mediated between the two parties. The parties clashed again in February, during the international incident sparked by the Moța–Marin funeral. This event, celebrating Guardist participation in the Spanish Civil War, was attended by Axis diplomats, causing an uproar among mainstream politicians. Speaking for the FR, Ioanițescu criticized foreign meddling in Romanian affairs, but also alleged that the PNȚ had desecrated a "heroic sacrifice" by raising a political issue.

According to left-wing journalist Emanoil Socor, the FR's response to this "defiance of stately prerogatives" was dictated by the PNC, but in fact contrasted with the moderation of regular party members. Later that year, the Vaidists and the PNȚ's left were still irreconcilable, with FR venues again pressing for a nationalist–monarchist alliance. This approach became normative after April elections for council seats in Sibiu County: Vaidists and National Christians ran on separate lists, which diminished both parties' chances; the FR also discovered that, though Nazified, Saxon voters preferred Saxon moderates to Romanian nationalists. Similarly, a local FR–Iron Guard alliance for the local council of Piatra Neamț failed to make an impact. In April, the Front and the PNC were ridiculed for their anti-PNȚ alliance in Deva, which also offered an eligible position on the municipal council to Mór Lőrincz, of the local Jewish community. During the May election at Chișinău, the FR ran its on list. It only gathered 249 votes, below the PNC's 652; the PNȚ list, meanwhile, took the majority with 3,736.

The PNȚ boasted several victories in the local elections of June. The National Peasantist press noted that victory came despite a "conspiracy" between government and "right-wing parties" (PNC and FR), and despite an "unhinged" propaganda campaign mounted by the extreme right "united under the Vaidist sign". Similar claims were advanced by a leftist daily, Dimineața, who noted that the Front had been defeated by Ilie Lazăr in Maramureș County, "although they fell back on the most outlandishly antisemitic propaganda ever witnessed in Maramureș, and despite all the benevolent support from the Liberals [and] from some propagandists of the Iron Guard". PNȚ activists were incensed by Tilea's claim that Maniu had turned republican, which they described as calumny; in reaction, they claimed that Tilea, the "kinglet of Vaidism", ran a forestry business financed by Jewish capital.

Vaida played down the election as "unimportant", arguing that the poor showing was a result of his party refusing to corrupt itself with sponsorships. At the end of this race, the FR's best result was a second place in Ilfov, with 13,505 of the votes cast, a 22% of the total. This gave it 13 seats in the Bucharest–Ilfov Council. During its campaign, the Front had promised to expropriate land all around Bucharest, to be used for affordable housing and a green belt. The unusual success was also made possible by divisions within the PNL, which as a result took no seat. The FR representation, led by Ioanițescu, had an enduring ideological conflict with the PNȚ chapter under Virgil Madgearu, which only had a 4-man majority.

In July, the FR sought to revive itself in other regions by accepting pacts with the PNL and the PNC for the county elections in Putna. With the PNȚ ready to assume power, but waiting on the royal prerogative, Carol II ordered it to accept Vaida-Voevod at Internal Affairs. As noted by Tilea, "Mr Ion Mihalache never even dared cross Mr Vaida's threshold", since doing so would have alienated him from its supposed sponsors, "the foreign bankers". By most accounts, Carol knew that this request would be ignored, and only hoped to create more rifts between the two currents within the PNȚ. Carol also pressed on for a "cute" merger between the two parties, arguing that both Vaida and Mironescu were essentially Peasantists in their outlook. This intervention renewed the tensions within that group: Armand Călinescu, who had served under Vaida and was close to the king, criticized the party leadership for not sealing a deal with the FR. This pact was endorsed in October 1937 by Vaida and Tilea, who reportedly accepted the supremacy of "National-Peasantist ideology". Maniu was also persuaded during secret meetings with Nițescu, describing his break with Vaida as a "temporary" matter. However, during new talks in November, Vaida clarified that he still expected the PNȚ's left to be expelled, and only wanted to absorb the centrists.

Meanwhile, Vaida was collaborating with Carol on the old project of uniting right-wing monarchists into a single governing bloc. In November 1937, he participated in a secret gathering of Carlist figures, including Averescu, Brătianu, Cuza, Filipescu, the PRȚ's Grigore Iunian, and the Iron Guard's Zizi Cantacuzino. They discussed forging a "national union" from their respective parties. However, Filipescu also denounced such dealings and favored the PNȚ—who, he argued, "will take power without Vaida and without Iunian". The FR preserved its nominal independence ahead of the new general election. According to diarist Liviu Rebreanu, this was after Mihalache had openly refused to accept Vaida; the latter was persuaded by "that foul man Tilea" into supporting a new Tătărescu administration. Rebreanu described the arrangement as Vaida's political destruction. In December, the FR registered for this with a new electoral symbol, comprising a rectangle split into solid-white and solid-black halves. The "target" was instead being reused by Al. Samoilă's group, the General Union of Small Industrialists.

=== PNL alliance ===
Before the race, the PNȚ had signed its own "non-aggression pact", with the Iron Guard. The FR (having failed in its bid to coalesce with the Guard) ran as an ally of the PNL. Iunian provided a quick reaction to the news: "The Liberals, a party which claims to be democratic and opposed to the far-right, have found nothing better to do than to associate themselves with Mr Vaida. You are aware of his program: numerus Valachicus and other more or less serious pleasantries. [...] Had the electoral law been modified, we would not be witnessing this demeaning spectacle." The pact was ridiculed by analyst Osvald Al. Teodoreanu as a "tiny monstrosity". Teodoreanu rejected claims that it was an attempt by the PNL to outdo its PNC competitors; he argued instead that Vaida had successfully duped his allies into assigning eligible positions to his clients. As part of this understanding, the two parties shared a single lists, but no Vaidists were allowed to run in four counties of Western Moldavia—Botoșani, Fălciu, Iași and Roman.

FR propaganda explained that Vaida's ideas had "corrected" the PNL's stance on various topics, adjusting it to the "stringent necessities of life." Tilea reported to disgruntled FR members that the PNL was largely consonant with a "consolidation of Romanian forces", and that the alliance was aimed at defending Romania against encroachment by the Soviet Union, whose "tentacles extend like a spider's web over Europe in its entirety". As noted in its election manifesto, the FR had largely accepted PNL guidelines in foreign affairs: "The Romanian Front is determined to respect the directives of our traditional policy, meaning that it is committed to those countries who have contributed toward unifying the Romanian land [in 1918], and whose interests we share. But [it also] believes that we should maintain good relations with all states, refusing to meddle into their internal affairs, or to initiate any crusades for the victory of this and that ideology."

Such re-positioning created a new set of tensions between the FR and the Guardists. In Putna, a local Vaidist was physically assaulted after referring to the Guardists as "thieves and criminals", reminding them about the Duca assassination. The PNC also publicly turned against the FR, punishing its apparent conciliation with the Carlist project. Goga's colleague Istrate Micescu published scathing attacks against Vaida, which were then popularized in Western media. The FR alliance was welcomed in Germany as a sign that the PNL was being Nazified from within. One tangible consequence was that the National Liberals stripped Jews from their electoral lists, on Vaida's request. As head of the PNL chapter in Roman County, Ion Manolescu-Strunga explained to his followers that the FR was right about "the Jews who have arrived in this country after 1919", as these "form a dangerous anti-state element, one which will also end up ruining the native Jewish element." At the time, the Front's own antisemitic discourse became more explicit, with Vaida asking that Romania be "deloused" of its Jews, slated for mass deportation to Mandatory Palestine. Also joining this pact was the Nazi-influenced German Party, brought into it by a separate understanding with Vaida. The two agreed to run on a "nationally oriented" platform, against communism.

In some respects, the pact was a failure. Vaida himself explained to his colleagues that he would become Tătărescu's "staunchest opponent", and that the FR agenda remained intact—although, as Argetoianu writes, the nationalist current was "in shambles". On the PNL side, Iamandi actively sabotaged the alliance, and was probably responsible for the exclusion of Vaidist candidacies at Iași; a similar move took place in Neamț County. In tandem, Glasul Bucovinei, as the PNL mouthpiece in Cernăuți County, noted that the local "Vaidist organizations" were not actively supporting the common effort. Hațieganu and other Transylvanians quit the Front, calling it a "mockery" and a "sold-over". They maintained control over Frontul Românesc newspaper, which they reissued as Frontul. Upon being reintegrated by the PNȚ's regional committee, Hațieganu declared Vaida to be a "great man, but one who errs". The FR leadership retorted, alleging that Hațieganu, had been a "zealous protagonist" in FR–PNL talks. According to this source, Hațieganu was actually angered by the Front's refusal to sanction his electoral nepotism.

The deal was only apparently lucrative for the PNL: the FR had registered significant gains in some by-elections, but the extra votes came from members of the Guard, as the latter had opted not to put up candidates of its own. Some of the FR's electorate refused to vote for the PNL, and Jewish National Liberal supporters were also largely alienated. Following indecisive results, Carol used his prerogative to call in a PNC minority government, under Goga. This act surprised Vaida, who was sure that no explicitly antisemitic party would ever be let into government by Carol. Since he had been overlooked by Carol, he reportedly resumed his negotiations with Maniu, and proposed himself as chairman of the reunified PNȚ. In parallel, he agreed to collaborate with the PNC, but asked that he lead the coalition cabinet; this notion was rejected by Goga.

Goga also courted the Guard, but was swiftly refused, which led to campaigns of violence on both sides. Vaida was horrified by this outcome, and spoke out publicly against Guardist agitation, ridiculing its slogans. During its brief period in government, the PNC modified the electoral law to limit representation for smaller parties, hoping to attract the FR into a merger; Vaida refused, but Ioanițescu agreed, bringing the entire Old Kingdom sections of the FR under Goga's control. The pact also created tensions within the PNC itself, since it required Goga's followers to also accept reconciliation with Potârcă. As a consequence, PNC radicals staged an anti-Potârcă riot in Craiova. In January 1938, the PNȚ newspaper Facla reported that "the Vaidist party" had lost all credit with the public, and was "morally supporting" the PNC. According to the same source, the FR's fripturiști ("parasites") were pressing Vaida to accept complete merger.

Vaida's cooperation with Goga ended abruptly on January 15, when the former withdrew parliamentary support, noting that Goga "endangers the true nationalist principles." Goga himself publicly celebrated Ioanițescu's induction, boasting that the PNC government had effected the desired fusion of right-wing groups. He referred to the cabinet as a "National-Christian, Peasantist, Romanian union". Serving Goga as Interior Minister, Călinescu prepared new electoral regulations for the national vote, scheduled for March 1. His system outlawed political symbols of any kind, and assigned the competing lists a number of dots (or "eyes"), depending purely on the order of applications received—the Vaidists had three. The law was described by Mihalache as a "swindle" which borrowed and manipulated the electoral customs of Siam, and was intended to confuse voters; Maniu called on the Court of Cassation to overrule it, and asked for the FR to be cited as a witness.

=== Demise ===
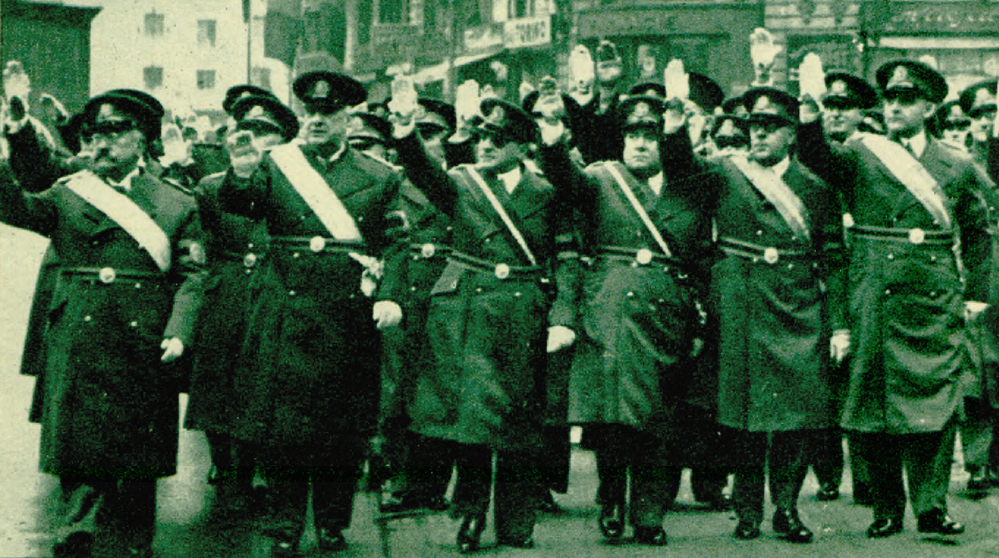
Leaders of the National Renaissance Front on Calea Victoriei, marking the first-year anniversary of the Carlist Constitution (February 1939). From the left: Vaida, Constantin Argetoianu, Armand Călinescu, Victor Iamandi, Victor Slăvescu, Mihail Ghelmegeanu

On January 24, the FR reached an agreement with the PNȚ and the Iron Guard, whereby the three groups would distribute their parliamentary seats on a parity basis. The Electoral Commission revised its decision on January 29, when it assigned three dots to the PNȚ, and four to the FR. Vaida received visits from two PNȚ militants, Grigore Gafencu and Mihail Ghelmegeanu, who pushed for a reunification of the two groups. Patria, a PNȚ newspaper, reported that a fusion was planned to take place before February 1. On that day, Dragomirescu informed the public that the FR would continue as an independent group, in the process of reorganizing itself, and ready to collaborate with the PNC government. He reported that the Front was now divided into regional chapters. He himself was leader of the Western Moldavian chapters; Angelescu, Nițescu and Cândea respectively chaired over the Old-Kingdom (excluding Moldavia), Transylvania, and Bukovina sections. Patria reported that Argetoianu and his Agrarian Union Party had engaged the Vaidists in talks to form an electoral cartel. Mirto had resigned from the FR during the final days of January, citing as his reason "Mr Vaida's duplicitous policy toward the nationalist government which is presided upon by Mr Goga."

On February 10, after "sham consultations" with Vaida and other opposition leaders, Carol toppled Goga and set up a government of his choice, under Patriarch Miron. Six former FR politicos, beginning with Ioanițescu, became ministers of that cabinet. The FR's strategists proposed to Carol that he outlaw all parties that were not explicitly monarchist; among their competitors, Călinescu proposed that these be merged into a single-party system. Vaida examined the option and remained a skeptic, since he believed Romanians were essentially unruly and too "Byzantine" to accept discipline and a unified command. In one of its final manifestos, penned by Nițescu, the FR had noted that Germany could not be trusted to guarantee Romania's borders, and that the "old alliances and friendships", including the Little Entente, still worked best for Romania. Nițescu also noted that solving the "Jewish question" could be done without German intrusion, and that antisemitism was important to the FR only as a facet of its "anti-alienism".

Formal disestablishment came on March 30, 1938. In the end, both the FR and PNC were officially subsumed by the National Renaissance Front (FRN) when Carol chose in favor of Călinescu's more dictatorial project. This catch-all group emerged in December 1938, and had six FR men signed on among the 53 founding members. One of them was Vaida himself, who noted: "I have the greatest spiritual satisfaction that, having submitted to the legal requirement of dissolving the 'Romanian Front', I witness HRH Carol II's 'National Renaissance Front', a new Phoenix, emerging from its ashes and those of other patriotic and well-meaning entities." He became critical of his peers in January 1939, when he noted that the numerus policy had been proclaimed, but never enforced, and that a ban on the Jewish liquor trade was not fully imposed. With the FRN takeover, Tilea became Carol's ambassador in the United Kingdom, trying to salvage the British–Romanian alliance in the face of German encroachment. During an international incident of March 1939, he warned that Germany would invade and carve-up Romania. Brudariu similarly accepted FRN offices, but expressed his dissidence, which was increasingly leftist and anti-fascist in tone.

Carol encouraged Vaida to hope that the FR and other groups would be reestablished as the loyal opposition to the FRN, but he eventually allowed Călinescu to veto any such proposals. "Vaidists" were still acknowledged as an "intermediary group", or distinct FRN faction, during the sham elections of June 1939, though Călinescu took pains to prevent their interference with the electoral process. One-time FR affiliates were the plurality of FRN leadership cadres in Cluj and Hunedoara counties. Upon his electoral validation, Vaida became Chamber President through acclamation, subsequently helping to pass legislation that introduced protectionism and banned workers' strikes. He took a conciliatory line in his discourse on minorities, arguing that these needed to be "kept on our side"; his stance was welcomed by the Hungarian deputy Ádám Teleki. Over that interval, Călinescu oversaw a repression of the Iron Guard, which resulted in him being assassinated by another Guardist death squad in September 1939. Immediately after, Vaida was considered for the position of Prime Minister ad interim, but lost to Gheorghe Argeșanu. From January 1940, Vaida was also FRN Chairman. In private, he derided this arrangement, noting that "renaissance" was a misnomer: "all the old politicians are today eminences of the [National Renaissance] Front."

In contrast to Tilea, Vaida accepted Nazi demands and, in 1940, acknowledged the Nazi-imposed cession of Northern Transylvania to Hungary. Almost uniquely among Carol's advisers, he also recommended a population exchange. Attempting to steer Romania close to Germany, Carol was again considering Vaida, widely seen as a Nazi favorite, for the Romanian premiership. The FR's former leadership took different paths during the later stages of World War II. In late 1940, the FRN regime was replaced by the Iron Guard's National Legionary State, which was aligned with Nazism. Tilea refused to return home, and organized a pro-Allied Romanian lobby in London, also reaching out to the PNȚ opposition. Vaida remained in Romania during the interval. He was detained after the pro-Allied coup of 1944, and died in March 1950 while under house arrest in Sibiu. By then, Potârcă had emerged as a spokesman of the former FR, leading some of its members back into the PNȚ. In 1945–1946, former FR activist Hațieganu became the last-ever PNȚ man in government, serving as minister without portfolio under Petru Groza. In January 1945, communist Iosif Ardeleanu publicized his critique of Maniu as a man under "fascist influence", as shown by his cultivating Vaidists and Iron Guard defectors.

Mirto was allowed back into the PNȚ, but defected again in May 1946, before the parliamentary election in November. He joined the Alexandrescu Peasantists and was allowed into the communist-run Bloc of Democratic Parties, while Potârcă became one of its prominent critics. After 1948, a communist regime proceeded to investigate and imprison various other figures associated with the FR. In 1950, a "screening" campaign at the Ministry of Metallurgy expelled from the Communist Party a certain Botez, who had been found to be a former magistrate and FR affiliate. After having returned into PNȚ ranks, Vlad was arrested and sent to Sighet prison, where he died in July 1953. Potârcă was tortured and died in similar circumstances the following year; Hațieganu and Sever Dan were also held at Sighet, but both survived. Brudariu was initially accepted into Groza's Ploughmen's Front, but came under investigation in 1956. He was released from prison upon Groza's intervention in 1958, but died shortly after. While Buzdugan evaded arrest by going into hiding, Iovipale spent time in Pitești prison, and died while on probation in 1964. By contrast, his colleague Lepădătescu was promoted to high office within the Securitate, and helped to prosecute National Peasantist opponents of the regime.
