= Assassination of Armand Călinescu =

1939 murder of Prime Minister of Romania

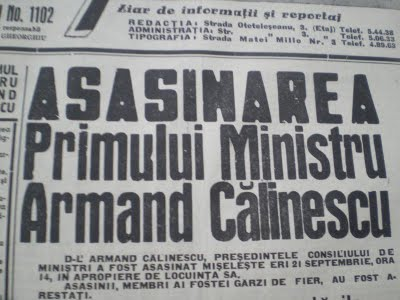
- Newspaper headline announcing the assassination
- Date: 21 September 1939; 86 years ago
- Location: Cotroceni, Bucharest, Romania
- Deaths: Prime Minister of Romania Armand Călinescu and his bodyguard, Radu Andone
- Accused: Members of the Iron Guard with Nazi support
- Sentence: Summary execution of hundreds of members of the Iron Guard, including the 9 assassins

Armand Călinescu, the then Prime Minister of Romania, was assassinated on 21 September 1939, aged 46, in Bucharest by Iron Guard members under the direct leadership of Horia Sima (exiled in Steglitz at the time). This was the culmination of several assassination attempts against him, which included an attack on the Romanian Athenaeum and bombing a bridge over the Dâmbovița River — both of which were uncovered by police. Călinescu was on a secret blacklist at the same time as Nicolae Titulescu, Dinu Brătianu, and General Gabriel Marinescu.

== Assassination ==
The action was carried out with German approval and assistance. According to historian Armin Heinen, the Legionary leadership exiled in Germany in 1938 received support from Alfred Rosenberg's NSDAP Office of Foreign Affairs, and possible SD backing for the assassination of Călinescu. On 1 September 1939, representatives of Germany, Fascist Italy, and the Iron Guard met in Copenhagen with Mihail R. Sturdza (Romania's ambassador to Denmark and a supporter of Sima), to discuss Călinescu's killing. Some details of the subsequent plan were offered to Romanian authorities by a renegade member of the Iron Guard, Mihai Vârfureanu. A death squad was formed, having as its members the lawyer Dumitru "Miti" Dumitrescu (who had been trained by the Gestapo and returned to Romania through Hungary), the students Cezar Popescu, Traian Popescu, Ion Moldoveanu, Ion R. Ionescu, and the draftsman Ion Vasiliu. Contacting each other in the area around Ploiești, they initially planned to kill Călinescu, King Carol, and General Marinescu together, and probably aimed to accomplish this in the Prahova Valley.

On 21 September, while passing through the Eroilor area on its return from the Cotroceni Palace, Călinescu's luxury automobile, a Cadillac, was ambushed by that of the assassins, who shot Călinescu, his bodyguard Radu Andone, and his driver. Miti Dumitrescu drove his car into the Premier's, which came to sudden stop as it ran into a cart — Andone was gunned down as he stepped out of the car, and Călinescu was shot while he was waiting on the back seat; over twenty bullets were recovered from his body. Sima, who is known to have crossed the border illegally in August of that year, was alleged to have disguised himself as a woman in order to witness the actions from nearby; other sources indicate a certain Marin Stănculescu as the covert supervisor. Ironically, Călinescu had never trusted the safety of his Cadillac, and had repeatedly asked Gavrilă Marinescu to allow him use of an armored car.

The group of assassins left the vicinity before the arrival of police forces, and stormed into offices of the Radio Broadcasting Society, holding the employees at gunpoint and cutting short the live airing of classical music, performed by the radio orchestra conducted by violinist Constantin Bobescu. Traian Popescu announced that the group had killed the Premier. The message was not broadcast, as, unbeknownst to the assassins, transmission had already been interrupted by Vasile Ionescu (one of the presidents of the Romanian Radio between 1935 and 1945), who managed to push the safety button and set off the alarm. Ionescu summoned two armed guards, Theodor Coșciug and Vasile Crâșmaru, and ordered Miti Dumitrescu and the seven other legionnaires to drop their guns and put their hands up.

== Legacy ==
The vast majority of sources reacting to the events made ample mention of German backing for Călinescu's killers, with the exception of German media. German sources alleged that Polish and British political forces had supported the assassination as a means to pressure Romania into abandoning its neutrality — this version was supported by, among others, Hans Fritzsche.

An even more severe repression of the Iron Guard followed under the provisional leadership of Gheorghe Argeșanu. It was inaugurated by the immediate execution of the assassins and the public display of their bodies at the murder site for days on end. A placard was set up on the spot, reading De acum înainte, aceasta va fi soarta trădătorilor de țară ("From now on, this shall be the fate of those who betray the country"). Students from several Bucharest secondary schools were required to visit the site (based on the belief that would dissuade them from affiliating with the Guard). Mass executions of known Iron Guard activists were ordered in various places in the country (some were hanged on telegraph poles, while a group of Legionnaires was shot in front of Ion G. Duca's statue in Ploiești). In all, over 300 members of the Iron Guard were killed. Călinescu was succeeded by Marinescu as Minister of the Interior and by Ioan Ilcuș as Minister of Defense.

One year later, the Iron Guard took its revenge against the repressors. Under the National Legionary State (the Iron Guard's government), Marinescu and Argeșanu, alongside other politicians, were executed in Jilava Prison, in the Jilava massacre on 26 November 1940. Also at that time, the Călinescu family crypt in Curtea de Argeș was dynamited, while a bronze bust of him which awaited unveiling was chained and dragged through the streets of Pitești. Călinescu's wife Adela was required to hand all of her husband's personal documents and, in a letter to Conducător Ion Antonescu, claimed to have been repeatedly harassed by agents of Siguranța Statului.
