= National Renaissance Front =

National Renaissance Front Frontul Renașterii Naționale
- Leaders: Armand Călinescu; Gheorghe Argeșanu; Constantin Argetoianu
- Founder: Carol II
- Founded: 16 December 1938
- Dissolved: 6 September 1940
- Merger of: Agrarian Union Party; People's Party; Romanian Front; Socialist Peasants' Party
- Headquarters: Bucharest, Romania
- Youth wing: Straja Țării
- Paramilitary: Garda Națională
- Labor wing: Muncă și Voe Bună
- Ideology: Authoritarian conservatism Corporate statism
- Political position: Right-wing to far-right
- Colours: Navy blue White
- Anthem: "Unity is written on our flag"

Party flag

The National Renaissance Front (Romanian: Frontul Renașterii Naționale, FRN; also translated as Front of National Regeneration, Front of National Rebirth, Front of National Resurrection, or Front of National Renaissance) was a Romanian political party created by King Carol II in 1938 as the sole legally permitted party in the country following his decision to ban all other political parties and suspend the 1923 Constitution, and the passing of the 1938 Constitution of Romania. It was the party of Prime Ministers Armand Călinescu, Gheorghe Argeșanu, Constantin Argetoianu, Gheorghe Tătărescu, and Ion Gigurtu, whose regimes were associated with corporatism and antisemitism. Largely reflecting Carol's own political views, the FRN was the last of several attempts to counter the popularity of the fascist and antisemitic Iron Guard. In mid-1940, Carol reorganized the FRN into the more radical Party of the Nation (Partidul Națiunii or Partidul Națiunei, PN), designed as a "totalitarian unity party". The party's anthem was "Pe-al nostru steag e scris Unire". It effectively ceased to function the following year when the Parliament of Romania was dissolved.

== History ==
=== Founding Members ===
Portfolio as of 16 December 1938

Incumbent Cabinet Ministers
Portfolio	Name	Party before 16 Dec. 1938
Patriarch; President of the Council of Ministers; Crown Councillor	Miron Cristea	
Minister of the Interior	Armand Călinescu	PNȚ
Minister of Finance	Mircea Cancicov	PNL
Minister of Justice	Victor Iamandi	PNL
Minister of the National Economy; Governor of the National Bank of Romania	Mitiță Constantinescu	PNL
Minister of Agriculture, Property, and Cooperation	Gheorghe Ionescu-Sisești	PND
Minister of National Education	Petre Andrei	PNȚ
Minister of Labour	Mihai Ralea	PNȚ
Minister of Public Works and Communications	Mihail Ghelmegeanu	PNȚ
Undersecretary of State at the Ministry of National Education	Dumitru V. Țoni	PND
Incumbent Politicians
	Grigore Gafencu	PNȚ
	Victor Slăvescu	PNL
	Dumitru Alimănișteanu	PNL
	Constantin C. Giurescu	PNL
	Ștefan Ghițescu	PND
	N. Miclescu	PND
	Alexandru Hodoș (ziarist)	PND
	Anibal Teodorescu	PND
	Nicolae Vasilescu-Karpen	PND
	Ioan Gr. Periețeanu	FR
	Viorel Tilea	FR
Industrialists
	Constantin Garoflid	
	Ion Gigurtu	
	Ion Bujoiu	
Generals
Chief of the General Staff (1927–1932, 1934–1937)	Gen. Nicolae Samsonovici	Army
	Gen. Gheorghe Rusescu	Army
	Gen. Nicolae Rujinschi	Army
Chief of the General Staff (1937)	Gen. Ion Sichitiu	Army
People of Culture
	Gheorghe Manu	
	Constantin Rădulescu-Motru	
	Ion Petrovici	
	Dimitrie Gusti	
	Iuliu Hațieganu	
	Victor Vâlcovici	
	Lucian Blaga	
Crown Council Members
Chief of the General Staff (1916–1918, 1918–1920); Crown Councillor	Mareșal Constantin Prezan	Army
President of the Council of Ministers (1919); Crown Councillor	Gen. Artur Văitoianu	PNL
President of the Council of Ministers (1919–1920, 1932, 1933); Crown Councillor	Alexandru Vaida-Voevod	FR
President of the Council of Ministers (1930, 1930–1931); Crown Councillor	Gheorghe Mironescu	PNȚ
President of the Council of Ministers (1931–1932); Crown Councillor	Nicolae Iorga	PND
President of the Council of Ministers (1933–1934); Crown Councillor	Constantin Angelescu	FR
President of the Council of Ministers (1934–1937); Crown Councillor	Gheorghe Tătărescu	PNL
Crown Councillor	Constantin Argetoianu	PUA
Marshal of the Court 1936–1937); Crown Councillor	Gen. Ernest Ballif	

Individuals who did not join was: Iuliu Maniu (former Prime Minister 1928–1930, 1930, 1932–1933, PNȚ), Virgil Madgearu, Mihai Popovici, Grigore Iunian, Nicolae L. Lupu, Dinu Brătianu and Gheorghe I. Brătianu

=== Context ===
The conflict between Carol II and the Iron Guard became noted during the election of December 1937, when the monarch backed the National Liberal Party (PNL) of incumbent Premier Tătărescu, expecting it to carry the vote; in effect, the result was inconclusive, with none of the parties receiving enough of a percentage to be awarded a majority bonus, and with political rivalries preventing any single coalition. Faced with this outcome, Carol chose to back the antisemitic National Christian Party (PNC) of Octavian Goga and A. C. Cuza, appointing Goga as the new Prime Minister on December 26, 1937—effectively, this led the two main traditional parties, the PNL and the National Peasants' Party (PNȚ), to become marginalized. Instead, the new regime's establishment caused a migration of politicians from the PNȚ, comprising Armand Călinescu, who chose to support the new policies and joined the Goga cabinet.

A paramilitary grouping, the blue-shirted Lăncieri, was established as the new arm of the regime, and soon began acting against both groups of Iron Guard agitators and members of the Jewish community. The incidents had negative effects on Romanian society: the Jewish middle class boycotted the system by withdrawing their investments and refusing to pay taxes (to the point where the National Bank of Romania declared the regime's insolvency), while France and the United Kingdom threatened Romania with sanctions, and the Soviet Union withdrew its embassy from Bucharest.

=== Clash with the Iron Guard ===
After an initial violent confrontation with the Iron Guard, Goga, assisted by the Polish envoy Mirosław Arciszewski, signed a pact with its leader Corneliu Zelea Codreanu (February 8, 1938), a move which threatened to topple Carol's original designs. Two days later, the PNC was deposed and the monarch created a national government around Miron Cristea, Patriarch of the Romanian Orthodox Church, backed by right-wing figures such as Tătărescu, Alexandru Averescu, Alexandru Vaida-Voevod, Nichifor Crainic, and Nicolae Iorga.

The new corporatist and authoritarian Constitution of Romania, promulgated on February 20, 1938, proclaimed stately interest to be above individual ones. According to its text, "all Romanians, regardless of their ethnicity and their religious faith" were required to "sacrifice themselves in defending [the country's] integrity, independence and dignity", while it was stipulated that "no one can consider oneself free from civil and military, public or private duties on the grounds of one's religious faith or any other kind of faith".

A law passed in April, defining the "defense of state order", restricted all other forms of political association, forbade political chants and paramilitary displays, banned the press organs of political parties, and condemned political contacts between Romanian forces and outside patrons.

In April, following an orchestrated conflict between Iorga and Codreanu, a large number of Iron Guard activists, including Codreanu himself, was prosecuted and jailed on orders from Călinescu, the Minister of Internal Affairs. As Carol witnessed the failure of European countries to defend themselves from Nazi German advances, consecrated by the Anschluss and the Munich Agreement, he met with Adolf Hitler at Berghof (November 24, 1938), and became convinced that Romania faced a similar fate. He subsequently ordered the Iron Guard, whom he perceived as a fifth column for the Germans, to be decapitated: during the following days, Codreanu and the majority of top-ranking Guardists were assassinated, while secondary ones, led by Horia Sima, fled the country and took refuge in Germany, where they remained after the outbreak of World War II. There, they began plotting a revenge against the regime's officials, including Carol.

=== Creation ===
The FRN itself was created as the first monopoly party in Romania's history, through the Royal Decree of December 15, 1938. The legislation proclaimed that, ex officio, all members of the Royal Council were its members, while all citizens over the age of 20 could apply to join; by law, people who engaged in any other political activity faced being stripped of their civil rights for as long as 5 years. Writing at the time, Călinescu defined the FRN as "mainly a spiritual movement", proclaiming the FRN's goals of "re-establishing the rights of the State, its natural parts", "promoting the general interests of the collectivity" and "[giving] life a sense of moral value".

In May 1939, the electoral law suffered drastic changes: the voting age was raised to 30, voters had to be literate and employed in one of three fields (agriculture and manual labor, commerce and industry, intellectual professions), and new, fewer precincts were drawn up (11 in all, standing for the 10 new ținuturi and Bucharest). The Senate, whose eligible members could only be voted into office by high-ranking members of corporations or guilds (bresle), comprised a number of members for life (in addition to those already holding the office by the time the law was adopted, these were religious leaders and various members of the House of Hohenzollern-Sigmaringen—a seat was reserved for Mihai, the heir to the throne and "Grand-Voivode of Alba Iulia", from the date of his coming of age).

Carol's regime has generally been viewed as (if at all) superficially fascist, and endorsed by the United Kingdom and France as a means to present a line of defense against Nazism in the Balkans (the Western press held, overall, a sympathetic view of the FRN). The Front adopted fascist symbols and discourse. After January 1939, party members wore uniforms (navy blue or white in color), with various ceremonial hats. The Roman salute was a mandatory greeting.

Ever since the years of its existence, the FRN and its government have been the target of ridicule, and their ideology has been described as "operetta fascism". After attending a Parliament session in 1939, Marthe Bibesco mocked the sight of uniforms:

"It is a garden of lilies and daisies, a colonial parliament. […] Argetoianu looks like a white elephant. […] The old politicians […] have [thus] been whitewashed, like fruit trees or train station water-closets—like anything requiring disinfection."

=== Political tendencies ===
Ideologically, the FRN took inspiration from three main sources. It fused messages borrowed from and used against the Iron Guard with those of the traditional Right, while also stressing several left-wing tenets. Among the far right tendencies it absorbed was the small-scale fascist-inspired feminist and racist movement formed by Alexandrina Cantacuzino (Gruparea Națională a Femeilor Române, the National Grouping of Romanian Women). Although Cantacuzino's ideology remained relatively influential for the following years, the Grouping itself was dissolved in 1939.

The FRN continued to make use of antisemitism, and appealed to nationalists by promising to find an answer to the "Jewish Question". Before 1940, no Antisemitic law was passed, but, as a rule, Jews were denied FRN membership. The arbitrary measure of the Octavian Goga cabinet, through which hundreds of thousands of Jews had been stripped of their citizenship, was continued through a requirement that all those excluded be registered as foreigners. Members of the community were encouraged to leave the country. Nevertheless, violence was reduced, especially since its main agents, the Iron Guard and the National Christian Party, had been outlawed.

The Front's policies in respect to other ethnic minorities, as Călinescu reported, aimed to "show [the new regime's] benevolence to the foreign elements, as long as they are sincerely integrated in the life of the State". Also according to Călinescu, the FRN rejected all notion of territorial reshaping ("There are not, and cannot be any territorial problems […]"). In one notable example, Carol chose to reestablish the seat held in Parliament by the Polish minority of Bukovina, and awarded it to Tytus Czerkawski — this followed intense campaigning from politicians and journalists in the Republic of Poland for Romania to review the centralist policies set by Ion Nistor in 1919.

Notably, the FRN also incorporated much of the leftist tendency inside the PNȚ (Călinescu, Mihail Ghelmegeanu, Petre Andrei, Mihai Ralea, Cezar Petrescu), drawing on a Poporanist legacy, while enlisting support from well-known socialists such as Gala Galaction, Ioan Flueraș, and George Grigorovici, the later becoming undersecretary in the Ministry of Labour and member of the Senate of Romania.

The corporatist structure, which, in theory, covered the entire Romanian society, was centered on newly founded guilds, overseen by Flueraș and forming the basis for representation in Parliament. A minimum wage was imposed on private enterprises, while a body regulating leisure, Muncă și Voe Bună, was created on the model set by the Nazi Strength Through Joy and the Italian fascist Opera nazionale dopolavoro. The organization grouping youth, Straja Țării, had been functioning since 1934–35; in addition, university students were enrolled in work teams and required to assist in harvests and other countryside projects. As part of the FRN's focus on modernization (which it imposed from top to bottom), special mobile teams visited villages and provided hot showers for peasants.

=== Factionalism and opposition ===
While, arguably, most Romanian citizens accepted the new political context, the FRN had relatively few convinced cadres—its upper ranks were occupied by traditional politicians who were popularly associated with corruption and Carol's, and much of its membership comprised civil servants whose affiliation was mandatory. According to Marthe Bibesco:

"Among [the parliamentarians], many have daubed the king in mud and, at the smallest proof of weakness on his part, are ready to daub him anew. This is probably why he has given them clothes that stain easily—to prevent them from smirching themselves. But who could ever stop them?"

Businessmen associated with Carol continued to make the bulk of their income from state contracts, progressively orienting themselves towards the arms industry (Nicolae Malaxa, an industrialist and personal friend of Carol, collected profits of 300–1,000% during the FRN period).

Mihai Ralea (standing) and Gheorghe Grigorovici (in FRN uniform) at a National Renaissance Front meeting. Behind them is a giant portrait of King Carol II of Romania. Both were leaders in the interwar left-wing Romanian politics.

In January–February 1939, a conflict erupted between Carol and Nicolae Iorga, following the latter's refusal to wear the FRN uniform during public ceremony, and worsened by his protest against Constantin Rădulescu-Motru's proposal to have all Romanian Academy members join the Front. When Iorga used the academy hall to publicize his opinion, the king sent Colonel Ernest Urdăreanu to end the proceedings. Censored, Iorga appealed to other means of making his opinions known, and, during a seminar he held in his home, voiced harsh criticism of the FRN:

"See the outings of the tyrant [Carol] among silent crowds with eyes sparkling [out of anger] and yet the next day journals announce that the sovereign was acclaimed… No book can be published without reaching the tyrant. The sovereign disposes of public opinion each morning, as soon as he wakes up. There is no public opinion, there is a committee of public opinion coordinating the wishes of the crowd. Raise not your voice, or else a will spy betray you, a plain clothes man will arrest you, a gendarme or a butcher will beat you up savagely, and occasionally, in the Police cellars, your head will be crushed or put up against the wall. It is as if we were living under the terror of the GPU in Lubyanka. […] Constitutional guarantees have disappeared. We know a man can be arrested, killed. Individual security is a trifle. We have no representatives in Parliament to decide our taxes and tell our grievances."

Iorga also made an angry remark in respect to the new Constitution:

"Our Constitution should be the product of the nation, relying on strict principles of the soul and the manifestations of our people. Our first Constitution was created by a certain Alecu Constantinescu, and that of last February by Istrate Micescu, an idiotic jurist who only sees that which is written in his manuals and that which the king has told him."

Similar criticism was voiced in respect to Armand Călinescu, who had repeatedly pressured him to accept wearing the uniform. Eventually, Carol reconciled with the academic, and Iorga even agreed to wear the FRN uniform (while specifying that he was doing it upon the monarch's request, and not for "those […] who believe themselves to be the founding-figures of a country"—in likely reference to Călinescu).

The political structure continued to be marked by rivalries between various politicians—according to Argetoianu, these opposed Tătărescu to the Royal Commissioner Victor Iamandi, as well as to a Transylvanian faction formed around Alexandru Vaida-Voevod (successor to the Romanian Front), and the latter grouping to the one around A. C. Cuza, emerged from the National Christian Party. Argetoianu stressed that this process was similar to "the era of elections". Despite such contradictions, the regime did exert an attraction on lower middle class people who had been underrepresented in previous decades.

In contrast with official ideology, Carol allowed other opposition parties to exist in all but on paper, kept contacts with them, and, in early 1940, had meetings with the PNL's Dinu Brătianu, the PNȚ's Ion Mihalache, and the dissident left-winger Nicolae N. Lupu, attempting to persuade each to merge their groupings with the FRN. Reacting to the collaboration between PNL and PNŢ, he offered the former a chance to form a new cabinet, but the offer was refused following its rejection by Gheorghe I. Brătianu. According to the leading PNȚ member Ioan Hudiță, the Front continued to find sympathy inside his own party, and some of its figures (including Mihalache, Virgil Madgearu, and Mihai Popovici) allegedly considered affiliating with it.

In this context, social opposition and the labor movement were insignificant. Having always been a minor grouping, the Communist Party of Romania (PCdR) had been driven in the underground by repression during the 1920s and early 1930s, and had survived inside the country by infiltrating the left wings of other groupings. After 1939, the PCdR received an order from the Comintern to attempt infiltrating the FRN at a local level and attract its members to the far left. The main left-wing group, of the Social Democrats, continued to function in the same terms as other traditional parties, and organized several cultural and social events, all tolerated by the regime and part of them copied or arrogated. At the other end of the political spectrum, Corpul Muncitoresc Legionar, the Iron Guard's answer to trade unions, had only marginal appeal and was also driven underground.

=== FRN decline and Party of the Nation ===
The decline of the FRN came largely as a result of German successes in the early stages of World War II. In late summer 1939, the Romanian public opinion was shocked by news of the Molotov–Ribbentrop Pact, which effected an agreement between Romania's most powerful adversaries, and the regime began preparing for war: it organized military training for the population beginning in late August, and invested large sums into arms production (it was announced that the Romanian Naval Forces were fitted with one vessel each month). These measures signified that salaries of state employees fell by as much as 40%, to which was added the toll of expropriations. The United Kingdom significantly increased its imports from Romania, attempting to prevent products from reaching Germany, while Minister of Finance Mitiță Constantinescu imposed a tax on many outgoing products (according to Argetoianu, the decision was approved due to "the exceptional times we are living through, when we must sacrifice all interest to save the country's borders").

In parallel, several assassination attempts, ordered by Horia Sima from Germany, were foiled by Siguranța Statului before a death squad was able to murder Armand Călinescu, who had previously replaced Cristea as Premier, on September 21, 1939. At the same time, Romania began offering Germany a series of deals, hoping to dissuade its hostility: the latter received advantageous clearing agreements, while the Reichswerke joined Nicolae Malaxa in taking over the businesses of Max Auschnitt, who had been arrested in September. The property of other Jewish businessmen, in the oil industry (Astra Română), as well as in the sugar industry and in logging, was taken over by the state over the following months.

Eventually, as Germany completed its invasion of Poland and continued to voice support for Hungary in relation to Romanian-ruled Transylvania, Romania conceded to German economic demands (on March 7, 1940, the Gheorghe Tătărescu executive agreed to direct almost all cereal and oil exports towards Berlin). Romania did however offer assistance to Polish troops fleeing their country immediately after the start of Nazi occupation (see Polish–Romanian alliance). The country's position became even more precarious after the fall of France in May—as a direct consequence, Romania renounced its alliance with the United Kingdom and began attempts to join the Axis.

The change in policy also resulted in the reorganisation of the FRN as the Party of the Nation (June 21–2), under the leadership of Ion Gigurtu. The PN's character was significantly more fascist and totalitarian than the FRN had been, to the point where it has been described as a newly founded grouping. Indeed, the decree announcing the PN's creation depicted it as a "single and totalitarian party under the supreme leadership of His Majesty, King Carol II." The party restated its goal as "lead[ing] the moral and material life of the Romanian nation and state." A law passed during the same interval criminalized "activities against the interests of the Party of the Nation", "propaganda against the interests of the Party of the Nation", as well as "publicly removing, destroying, deteriorating, out of contempt or derision, the Party of the Nation's badges, emblems, uniforms, manifestos or publications". However, the FRN had been taking on a more fascist character for a time before then; as early as 1939, ministers greeted Carol with a fascist-style salute.

Carol also decided to appeal to Iron Guard assistance, allowed its freed activists to join the PN if they chose to do so, and, on June 25, 1940, he signed an agreement with Sima. Consequently, Sima became Minister of Culture in the Gigurtu cabinet, and two other Guardists were appointed to similar positions (Sima himself was to resign after just four days). The notorious Antisemite Nichifor Crainic, who was sympathetic to the Guard, was also assigned a cabinet post, as Minister of Propaganda. The new authorities produced the first racial segregation laws, based on the Nuremberg Legislation and aimed at the Jewish community—these notably introduced the legal concept of români de sânge ("Romanians by blood"), as a distinct category inside the body of Romanian citizens.

=== Downfall ===
In the wake of the Molotov–Ribbentrop Pact, on June 26, 1940, Romania was presented by the Soviet Union with an ultimatum demanding the cession of Bessarabia and Northern Bukovina. As a result, Romania withdrew its administration from the region, leaving room for Soviet annexation. On July 3, after the retreat had been completed, Carol remarked:

"News from Bessarabia is even sadder. Unfortunately I was right about the so-called [National Renaissance Front], as some of its leaders there seem to have converted to Bolshevism and were among the first to welcome Soviet troops with red flags and flowers."

The process described by Carol is known to have occurred in Soroca, where FRN officials (the former Prefect Petre Sfeclă, the Mayor Gheorghe Lupașcu, party branch leader Alexandru Anop, and school inspector Petre Hrițcu) hosted a ceremonial welcome for the Red Army.

On August 30, 1940, Germany and Fascist Italy pressured Romania into signing the Second Vienna Award, which assigned Northern Transylvania to Hungary (which also brought the German military presence within hours of the oil fields in Prahova County). Through the cession of Southern Dobruja to Bulgaria (the Treaty of Craiova) in early September, Greater Romania had come to an end, ending up in the shape it had at the end of World War I.

As Hungarian troops entered Northern Transylvania, Bucharest became the scene of massive public rallies, which called for the PN government to be replaced with one that would support the recovery of lost regions. The Iron Guard also maneuvered into action: on September 3, its cells in various cities attempted to take over the administration, but failed due to the authorities' response.

Faced with such incidents, Carol chose to reform his own government, and appealed to his rival, General Ion Antonescu, to form a military dictatorship and a cabinet. After agreeing, Antonescu, with support from various political forces and the Romanian Army, pressured Carol to step down and be replaced with his son Mihai. On September 6, 1940, the monarch agreed to leave his throne and country, settling in Brazil at the start of 1941; what contributed to this decision was Sima's support for Antonescu, and threat to assassinate Carol. Eight days after Carol's departure, the Iron Guard joined Conducător Antonescu in government, thereby establishing the National Legionary State (in existence until the Legionnaires' Rebellion of January 1941).

Right after dealing with opposition inside his own camp (by marginalizing the radical faction of Ion Zelea Codreanu), Sima issued calls for a violent reprisal against the former top FRN and PN politicians. On the night of November 26–27, 1940, sixty-four political prisoners were massacred in Jilava by Corpul Muncitoresc Legionar and Iron Guard affiliates in the Romanian Police (in theory, as reprisal for the killing of Corneliu Zelea Codreanu). At the same time, three former Police commissioners, held under arrest in Bucharest precincts, were also assassinated. On the evening of November 27, Iron Guard members stormed into the houses of Nicolae Iorga and the PNȚ's Virgil Madgearu—the two were kidnapped and shot; earlier in the day, Army officials intervened to save the lives of former Premiers Constantin Argetoianu and Gheorghe Tătărescu.

== Cultural legacy ==
Carol's regime in general and the FRN period in particular were noted for their large-scale cultural ventures. This was an integral part of Carol's designs to impose himself on collective memory as a new founder and a modernizing monarch, with a claim that Romania was undergoing full development under his rule. Lucian Boia indicated that, in contrast with his predecessors, Carol depicted himself as "a modern, dynamic king, present in the center of all that was happening in Romanian society".

Boia concluded that, despite his innovative stance, Carol encouraged similar praise of his predecessor, Carol I of Romania, to whom he was frequently associated in iconography and cultural reference (notably manifested in the 1939 inauguration of a massive equestrian statue of the first Hohenzollern-Sigmaringen king, crafted by Ivan Meštrović and erected near the Royal Palace).

== Electoral history ==
=== Legislature ===
Election	Leader	Votes	%	Seats		Position	Status
Election	Leader	Votes	%	Deputies	Senate	Position	Status
1939	Armand Călinescu	1,587,514	100	258 / 258	88 / 88	1st	Government (1939–1940)
