= Petre Andrei =

Romanian sociologist and politician

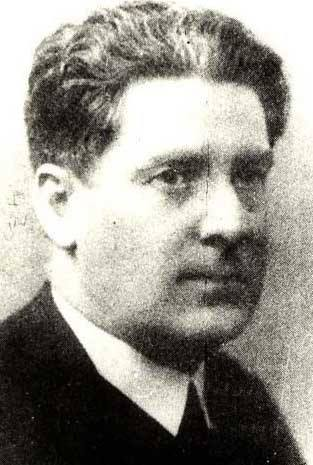
- Born: 29 June 1891; Brăila, Kingdom of Romania
- Died: 4 October 1940 (aged 49); Iași, Kingdom of Romania
- Cause of death: Suicide by cyanide poisoning
- Resting place: Eternitatea Cemetery, Iași
- Occupations: Academic, politician
- Spouse: Alice-Georgette Tulbure (m. 1920)
- Children: 4

Academic background
- Education: University of Iași
- Thesis: Filosofia valorii (1918)
- Doctoral advisor: Dimitrie Gusti
- Other advisor: Ion Petrovici

Academic work
- Discipline: Sociology
- Institutions: University of Iași
- Influenced
- Military career
- Allegiance: Romanian Army
- Service years: 1916–1918
- Conflicts: World War I; Third Battle of Oituz; Slănic-Moldova; Cașin Valley
- Awards: Order of the Star of Romania; Order of the Crown of Romania

Minister of National Education
- In office 5 December 1938 – 3 July 1940
- Prime Minister: Miron Cristea; Armand Călinescu; Gheorghe Argeșanu; Constantin Argetoianu; Gheorghe Tătărăscu
- Preceded by: Armand Călinescu
- Succeeded by: Dumitru Caracostea

Personal details
- Party: National Peasants' Party; National Renaissance Front

Petre Andrei (29 June 1891 – 4 October 1940) was a Romanian sociologist, philosopher, and politician who served as Education Minister in 1938–1940.

== Biography ==
=== Origins and work ===
He was born in Brăila, the fourth child of a family of low-ranking civil servants, Costache Andrei and Vasilica, née Conduriotis. He attended Nicolae Bălcescu High School from 1902 to 1910. He then moved to Iași, where he enrolled in the literature and philosophy faculty of the University of Iași, graduating in 1913. While a student, his mentor was Ion Petrovici. Andrei continued his education in Berlin, where he audited a seminar on logic and history of philosophy conducted by Alois Riehl, and in Leipzig. Returning home when the war broke out, he volunteered for service, in spite of being exempt due to the fact that his father was deceased. He was assigned to the 38th Infantry Regiment in March 1915, and from July to September 1916, during which time Romania entered the war, he attended the reserve officers' school in Târgoviște. He was sent to the 13th Regiment, effective November, and distinguished himself in the battles at Oituz, Slănic, and the Cașin Valley. For his acts of bravery, he was awarded the Order of the Star of Romania, the Order of the Crown, and the War Cross with Bars.

Petre Andrei's Filosofia valorii, published in 1945

In 1918, he defended his thesis, Filosofia valorii, at Iași, receiving the title of doctor in philosophy; the thesis defense committee consisted of Alexandru Philippide (presiding), Dimitrie Gusti (advisor), and Ion Petrovici (referee). His thesis would be published in 1945 by his son, Petru. In 1920, Andrei married Alice-Georgette Tulbure, a relative of Constantin Meissner. Initially a high school teacher, he was on the faculty of several Iași institutions: the National College, the Military High School, and the Orthodox High School for Girls. He was then a substitute professor of history of philosophy in the sociology department of the University of Iași, becoming a full professor in 1922. The appointment to this post, left vacant upon the departure of Gusti, prompted a fierce battle within the faculty that drew the attention of the contemporary press. One wing, led by Ion Găvănescu, pushed for Garabet Aslan; another, which Petrovici headed, wanted Andrei. The latter faction was joined by Garabet Ibrăileanu when Petrovici promised to support Mihai Ralea's appointment after the latter's return from France; and by the new dean, Traian Bratu, a bitter adversary of Găvănescu and his ally Orest Tafrali.

From 1927 to 1930, Andrei headed the local magazine Minerva, dedicated to cultural synthesis. His sociological ideas, which Andrei promoted both within and outside the department, are encapsulated in a series of studies and articles, among them: Sociologia revoluției, 1921; Problema fericirii; Fundamentul etic sociologic, 1921: Fascismul, 1927; Probleme de metode în sociologie, 1927; Probleme de sociologie, 1927; Sociologie generală, 1936; Manual de sociologie, 1938. He was among those professors who opposed the university's politicization. In 1924, as a member of the faculty senate, he condemned not only Corneliu Zelea Codreanu's assassination of Constantin Manciu, but also A. C. Cuza for using his department to spread nationalist ideas, calling him the "true moral assassin".

=== Politics ===
Attracted by its promise of deepening bourgeois democracy, Andrei joined the new National Peasants' Party (PNȚ) in 1928, becoming president of its Vaslui County chapter. He sat in the Assembly of Deputies while the PNȚ was in power from 1929 to 1933, making frequent speeches before the body. He spoke memorably of the role of parliament in the nation's political life, and worked to pass modern legislation, particularly in the fields of education and administration. In particular, he pushed for a law late in 1929 that brought about administrative decentralization, commenting that it would allow for a genuine exercise of national sovereignty. He was undersecretary of state at the Agriculture and Domains Department (1930) and the Public Instruction, Religious Affairs and Arts Ministry (1932–1933).

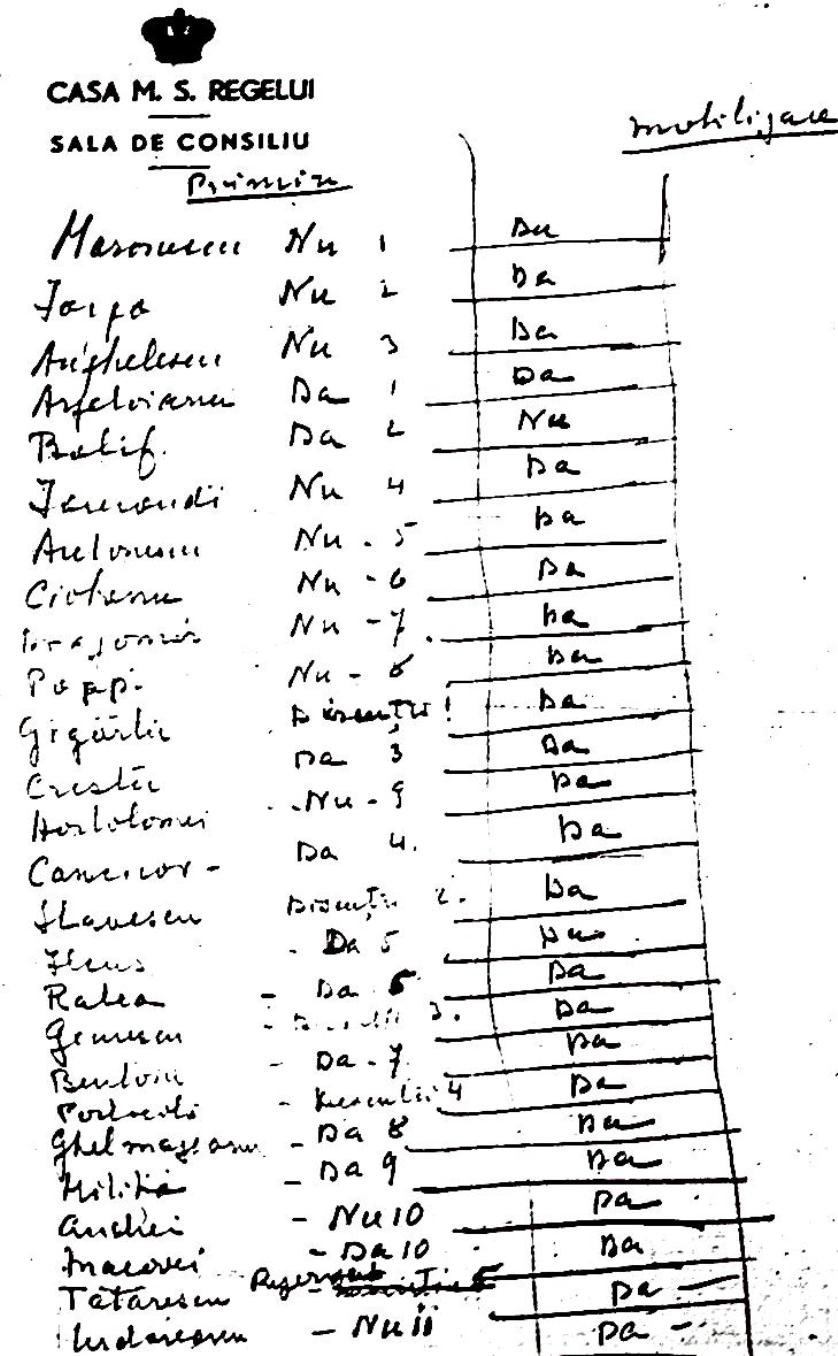
Andrei's first vote on the Soviet ultimatum and mobilization, registered on Romanian government stationery, alongside those of his cabinet colleagues

Andrei was conflicted when King Carol II established an authoritarian National Renaissance Front (FRN) regime in 1938. On the one hand, his character and civic impulses recoiled at the idea of dictatorship; nevertheless, he joined forces with what he saw as the only viable means of preserving domestic order, maintaining the country's traditional pro-French foreign policy, and crushing the Iron Guard. Andrei's hesitation can be seen in the diary he kept, where he opines that the law and not political assassination, which he utterly rejected, should decide serious national questions. Under the FRN regime cabinets of Miron Cristea, Armand Călinescu, Gheorghe Argeșanu, Constantin Argetoianu, and Gheorghe Tătărescu, he served as Education Minister from December 1938 to July 1940. His term witnessed the adoption of a law on the organization of professional, lower and middle education; and one on industrial boys' education. In addition, the foundations were laid for a law on higher education.

On 26 June 1940, the Soviet Union issued an ultimatum, demanding that Romania cede Bessarabia. During the Crown Council deliberations the next day, Andrei first voted to reject the ultimatum while accepting mobilization, but on the second, decisive ballot, he voted with the majority to accept it. The subsequent Soviet occupation of Bessarabia and Northern Bukovina sent Romania into a deep political crisis.

=== Downfall and legacy ===
Carol's abdication and the establishment of a National Legionary State in September 1940 had dramatic consequences for Andrei. The incoming Education Minister, Traian Brăileanu, ordered his dismissal from higher education, while the new dictator, Ion Antonescu, had him put under investigation. In early October, while Iron Guard members were searching his home and due to be arrested, he committed suicide, swallowing potassium cyanide. His political testament is contained in two letters: one to his wife, the other to his four sons. He is buried at Eternitatea Cemetery in Iași.

After World War II, the authorities of the new communist regime arrested his son Petru for having taken part in student anti-communist demonstrations; he was imprisoned from 1949 to 1952. Initially banned, the work of Petre Andrei was censored, with all passages referring to communist concepts, doctrine and practice excised, even from an authoritative edition published in the 1970s. Nevertheless, a rehabilitation of sorts began in 1970, when one of his most famous books, Sociologie generală, appeared at Editura Academiei in 1970. A further four volumes, under the heading Opere sociologice, came out between 1973 and 1983. In 1974, a treatise on sociological thought relegated Andrei to a "departmental sociologist", prompting a vigorous response from his son. Later in the decade and into the 1980s, Ovidiu Bădina and Romanian Communist Party ideologue Ștefan Voicu engaged in a polemic on the value of Andrei's work.

This could only be appreciated in full after the Romanian Revolution, when Petru Andrei made it his mission to preserve and publish his father's writings. In 1990, on the occasion of the 50th anniversary of his death, the private Petre Andrei University of Iași was founded. In January 1991, he was elected a titular post-mortem member of the Romanian Academy. His diary was published at Iași in 1993. Streets in Brăila and Iași bear his name.
