= Jilava massacre =

1940 massacre in Romania

Coordinates: 44°20′06″N 26°06′27″E

The Jilava massacre took place during the night of 26 November 1940, at Jilava Prison, near Bucharest, Romania. Sixty-four political detainees were killed by the Iron Guard (Legion), with further high-profile assassinations in the immediate aftermath. It came about halfway through the fascist National Legionary State and led to the first open clash between the Guard and conducător Ion Antonescu, who ousted the Legion from power in January 1941.

== Background ==
Under King Carol II, repressive measures against the Iron Guard gathered pace in the late 1930s; a cycle of violence on both sides left many dead, including Prime Minister Armand Călinescu and Corneliu Zelea Codreanu, the Guard's founder and leader. After Carol abdicated in September 1940 and the Guard ascended to power, its members thirsted for revenge, seeking to eliminate those who had participated in the various legal and illegal actions taken by the king's regime. The more restrained Antonescu sought punishment through legal means. Within his first month in power, he approved an official probe into all those who could not account for becoming wealthy very fast in the last years of Carol's rule, and established a special court to investigate crimes committed by the previous regime's principal figures, or in their name, against the Guard.

The court ordered the arrest of those to be investigated, had them imprisoned at Jilava, and entrusted them to the custody of special Legionary formations, described by Alexandru Creţianu as "nothing less than an improvised version of the SS strong-arm squads".

The investigation underway, the court, wishing to obtain testimony from the detainees in order to prepare for their trials, ordered several of them to be transferred to another jail, where their depositions would be taken. However, Ștefan Zăvoianu, the Bucharest Prefect of Police in charge of the Legionary squads guarding the prisoners, believed Antonescu had changed his mind about executing those responsible for Codreanu's death and refused to comply with the order. This alerted the military authorities, who decided to replace the squads with regular military guards and move the prisoners themselves. Zăvoianu was informed of this decision on November 26, and that night the squads shot dead every one of their charges: politicians, senior military officers, and policemen accused of complicity in Codreanu's arrest and execution.

== Victims ==
The 20-strong execution team, armed with semi-automatic Mauser pistols, was commanded by Dumitru Grozea, head of the Legionary Workers' Corps. Its members were aged between 18 and 25. Gheorghe Crețu, who killed 14 inmates, testified at his trial that Grozea gave the order to shoot at around 11:45 p.m., whereupon each executioner was sent to a particular cell, ordered the prisoners to stand and shot them. The executioners then gathered before the guards; together they went and paid homage before Codreanu's remains.

In all, 64 people were killed in the 19 cells of the prison. Each victim was shot at least twice; in all, some 579 bullets were fired during the 15 minutes the massacre lasted. Among those assassinated were former Prime Minister Gheorghe Argeșanu (who had presided over the reprisals following Armand Călinescu's assassination), former Justice Minister Victor Iamandi, former Bucharest police prefect and interior minister Gabriel Marinescu, several high-ranking officers of the Gendarmerie, including its head inspector General Ioan Bengliu, Colonel Zeciu (who had organised the killing of Codreanu and thirteen other Legionnaires), Majors Aristide Macoveanu and Iosif Dinulescu (who had prepared and carried out the killing), Staff Sergeant Sârbu (who had actually tightened the wire around Codreanu's neck, strangling him), as well as Mihail Vârfureanu (a former Legionnaire who turned informant and was responsible for female Guardist Nicoleta Nicolescu's assassination).

Also killed were former Chief of Secret Police Mihail Moruzov and his deputy, Niki Ștefănescu, who was shot 38 times. These two were not responsible for excesses against the Iron Guard, but in the past they paid many of its members, including Codreanu's successor as leader, Horia Sima, for services rendered as informants. Zăvoianu knew that the Legion would like to be rid of such inconvenient witnesses before any trials or investigations could take place.

== Aftermath ==
As a result of the massacre, the simmering power struggle between Sima and Antonescu reached crisis proportions. Informed of what had taken place on November 27, the latter immediately called a special meeting of the Council of Ministers, demanding that the government and the Legion issue a joint public statement disassociating themselves from and condemning the recent events. When asked why they did not attempt to prevent bloodshed, the Legionary ministers denied having any foreknowledge and tried to act as surprised as anyone else. Still, they all attempted to justify the murders, claiming it was the general impression among Legionaries that the court had no intention of punishing any of the accused, whom they assumed would eventually go free. Antonescu, unswayed, declared that: "the handful of reprobates who have committed this crime will be punished in an exemplary manner. I will not allow that the country and the future of the nation be compromised by the action of a band of terrorists... I was reserving the punishment of those held at Jilava for the justice system of the country. But the street decreed otherwise, proceeding to implement justice itself".

Sima replied that such a deed would not be repeated, to which Antonescu drew his attention to the fact that Nicolae Iorga's safety was threatened by Legionaries and he should take steps to ensure no harm was done.

Sima agreed, but by the end of the day was informed that Iorga, the venerable historian and former prime minister, had been murdered. Several Guard members had attacked him and Virgil Madgearu, secretary general of the National Peasants' Party, in their homes, kidnapped and shot them, and abandoned their bodies in a roadside ditch. Also on November 27, Zăvoianu and his men rounded up more leading figures of the Carlist regime, including former prime ministers Constantin Argetoianu and Gheorghe Tătărescu (saved by the quick intervention of Lt. Col. Alexandru Rioșanu), former prime minister Ion Gigurtu (saved by Sima) and former ministers Mihail Ghelmegeanu and Nicolae Marinescu; they were brought to the Police Prefecture with the intention of executing them, but spirited away to safety in the heavily fortified building of the Interior Ministry.

Codreanu, whose body was discovered on November 25, was reburied on November 30, along with the Decemviri and Nicadori. The Guard would claim that the assassins acted solely out of fury and a desire for revenge (the remains of their hero were being unearthed a short distance away as the massacre proceeded), and while the discovery doubtless stirred them to action, the procurement of arms and prison plans involved detailed planning that took time and premeditation. In July 1941, Zăvoianu, along with the former Legionary police officers Gheorghe Crețu, Octavian Marcu, Constantin Savu, and Ioan Tănăsescu, and the Legionary Dumitru Anghel, were sentenced to death and shot for perpetrating the massacre. That month, Dumitru Grozea and thirteen of his accomplices, mainly former police officers and Iorga's assassins, were condemned to death in absentia.

== See also ==
- Un comisar acuză, a film by Sergiu Nicolaescu based on the Jilava Massacre.
