= Iosif Blaga =

Romanian politician (1864–1937)

Iosif Blaga (Note: Romanian pronunciation: [ˈjosif ˈblaɡa]) (July 1, 1864–June 2, 1937) was an Austro-Hungarian-born Romanian literary theorist, aesthetician, priest, politician and educator.

Born in Lancrăm, near Sebeș in Transylvania, he studied at the local high school and in Alba Iulia, where he obtained a baccalaureate in 1884. He then studied at the Romanian Orthodox theological seminary in Sibiu (1884–1887) and at the Faculty of Letters of the University of Budapest (1887–1891), earning a doctorate in philosophy with a thesis on the problem of attention from a psychological and pedagogical viewpoint. He was a teacher and later principal at Andrei Șaguna High School in Brașov. From 1901 to 1912, he headed a society for promoting Romanian-language theater.

While traveling in Norway, Sweden and France from 1916 to 1919, he advocated on behalf of his native province, as well as for Romania, then under occupation by the Central Powers. He took part in a press committee in Stockholm, while in Paris, he helped draw an ethnographic map of Transylvania as part of the National Council for Romanian Unity. He was an elected member of the Great National Assembly that proclaimed the union of Transylvania with Romania at Alba Iulia. He returned to Brașov in 1919, and served as chief school inspector in the area from 1924 to 1925. Blaga was ordained archpriest of Brașov in 1924; his parish was St. Nicholas Church in Șcheii Brașovului.

Blaga represented Săcele in the Romanian Senate, of which he was vice president. He was part of the ASTRA national council and of the metropolitan council. He published several didactic, oratorical and psychological works, as well as literary theory: Teoria dramei (1899) and Din estetica tragicului (vol. I-II, 1900–1901). He was the uncle of Lucian Blaga. Late in life, he belonged to the Romanian Front. He died in Brașov in 1937, and was buried in the city's Groaveri cemetery.
