= Mihail Ghelmegeanu =

Romanian politician (1896–1984)

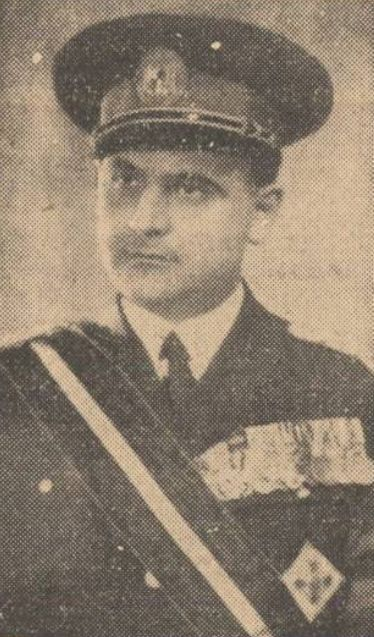
- Mihail Ghelmegeanu wearing the National Renaissance Front uniform

Minister of Interior of Romania
- In office 1939–1940

Minister of Public Works and Communications of Romania
- In office 1938–1939

Personal details
- Born: 25 June 1896 Craiova, Romania
- Died: 1984 Bucharest, Romania
- Party: National Renaissance Front (1938-1940)
- Other political affiliations: National Peasants' Party (1926-1938, 1940-1944); Socialist Peasants' Party (1944); Ploughmen's Front (1944-1953; Romanian Workers' Party/Romanian Communist Party (1953-1984)
- Education: University of Bucharest; University of Paris
- Profession: Jurist
- Awards: Order of the Star of the Romanian People's Republic, third class (1957)

Mihail Ghelmegeanu (25 June 1896 – 1984) was a Romanian jurist and politician.

Born in Craiova, he attended high school in Pitești. Subsequently, he entered the Faculties of Law and Literature at the University of Bucharest, and received a doctorate in law from the University of Paris in 1922. Admitted to the Ilfov County bar that year, in 1926 he joined the new National Peasants' Party (PNṬ). Elected to the Assembly of Deputies for Ismail County in 1928, he was a centrist within the party, supporting a focus on agricultural production. In 1932, he spoke out in the Assembly against the majority bonus system, arguing that representation should reflect the votes cast. During the Alexandru Vaida-Voievod government, he was undersecretary of state in the Agriculture Ministry, as well as head of the directorate for national minorities. Under Iuliu Maniu, he was state secretary for agriculture from 1932 to 1933.

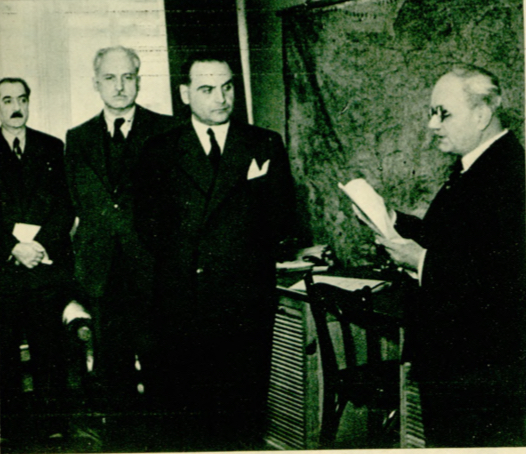
Ghelmegeanu, second from right, as Communications Minister in autumn 1938

A founding member in 1938 of the National Renaissance Front, between that year and the following, in the governments of Miron Cristea, Armand Călinescu, Gheorghe Argeșanu and Constantin Argetoianu, he was Minister of Public Works and Communications. From 1939 to 1940, he was Interior Minister. Following World War II, he was named president of the Romanian committee for applying the armistice convention, leading this body from 1945 to 1946. Again elected to the Assembly in 1946, he obtained a seat in the Great National Assembly in 1948, following the establishment of a Communist regime. He was a professor at the Bucharest Law Faculty until 1953, conducting research at the Romanian Academy's Legal Research Institute from 1954 to 1964. In 1964, he was awarded the Order of the Star of the Romanian People's Republic, 3rd class.
