= 1939 Romanian general election =

- 1–2 June 1939

All 258 seats in the Chamber of Deputies All 88 seats in the Senate
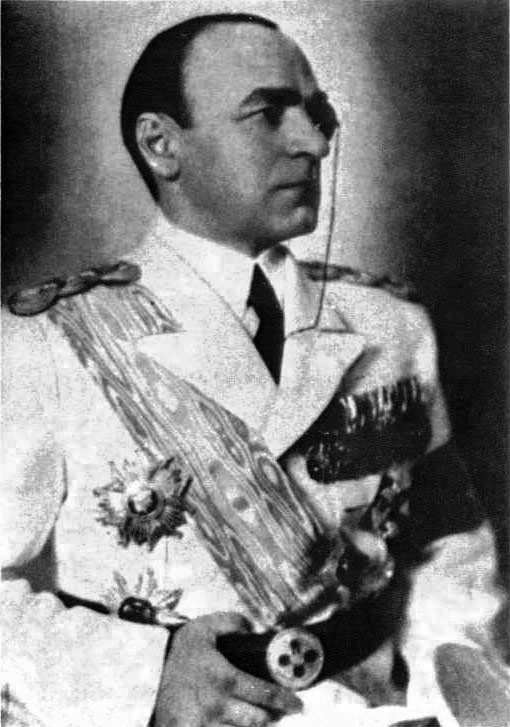
	Majority party
Leader	Armand Călinescu
Party	FRN
Seats won	258 C / 88 S
Seat change	C / - S
Popular vote	1,587,514
Percentage	100%
Prime Minister before election
Armand Călinescu
FRN
Subsequent Prime Minister
Armand Călinescu
FRN

General elections were held in Romania in June 1939. The Chamber of Deputies was elected on 1 June, and the Senate on the following day. They were the first elections since the introduction of the royal dictatorship of King Carol II under the 1938 constitution. Voters were presented with a single list from the National Renaissance Front, which had been the only legally permitted party in Romania since December.

== Electoral system ==
The new electoral system saw voters elect candidates in eleven constituencies. Within the constituencies voters and candidates were divided into groups based on their occupations, and could only vote or stand in those groups. Each constituency having between five and ten seats per occupational group. The number of seats for each group was the same in every constituency, even if the number of voters was different, leading to the over-representation of some groups, including the Industry and Commerce group. Voters had as many votes as there were seats available. The number of seats in the Chamber of Deputies was reduced from 387 to 258, whilst the number of seats in the Senate awarded through elections fell from 113 to 88.

The voting age was also raised from 21 to 30, with franchise limited to literate men and women who were effectively working in agriculture, commerce or industry or had an intellectual occupation. Opposition parties were banned.

== Results ==
=== Chamber of Deputies ===
Party	Votes	%	Seats
National Renaissance Front	1,587,514	100.00	258
Total	1,587,514	100.00	258
Valid votes	1,587,514	95.31	
Invalid/blank votes	78,045	4.69	
Total votes	1,665,559	100.00	
Source: Nohlen & Stöver

=== Senate ===
Party	Seats
National Renaissance Front	88
Total	88
Source: Nohlen & Stöver
