= Ioan Bengliu =

Romanian general (1881–1940)

- Born: 16 November 1881; Târgu Jiu, Gorj County, Oltenia, Romania
- Died: 26 November 1940 (aged 59)
- Cause of death: Jilava massacre

Ioan Grigore Bengliu (16 November 1881–26 November 1940) was a Romanian lieutenant-general.

== Biography ==
He was born in Târgu Jiu, Gorj County, in the Oltenia region of Romania.

From 1938 to 1940, he was Inspector-General of the Romanian Gendarmerie. After retiring, he was arrested by the Ion Antonescu-Horia Sima government, imprisoned at Jilava Prison, and subsequently assassinated by members of the Iron Guard in the 1940 Jilava massacre.
