= Corpul Muncitoresc Legionar =

Fascist association of workers in Romania

- Founded: 1936
- Dissolved: 1941
- Headquarters: Bucharest
- Location: Romania
- Members: N/A
- Key people: Gheorghe Clime; Dumitru Groza
- Affiliations: Iron Guard

Corpul Muncitoresc Legionar or Corpul Muncitorilor Legionari (CML, the Legionary Worker Corps or Legionary Workers' Corps) was a fascist association of workers in Romania, created inside the Iron Guard (which was originally known as the Legionary Movement) and having a rigid hierarchical structure. From its creation until September 1940, the CML was led by Gheorghe Clime; afterwards, the position was filled by Dumitru Groza, who oversaw the Corps during the period when the Iron Guard was in power — the National Legionary State —, and involved it in the 1941 Rebellion and Pogrom. The CML had its headquarters in Bucharest, on Calea Călăraşilor.

Together with the Iron Guard, it was outlawed by Conducător Ion Antonescu during the Rebellion, and dissolved itself. In time, the group formed around Dumitru Groza was drawn into collaboration with Antonescu, and later refused to become involved in talks with the Romanian Communist Party over the possibility of a political truce.

== History ==
=== Context and creation ===
Even before the Corps creation, the Legionary Movement's leader, Corneliu Zelea Codreanu, had already manifested a special interest in the labor movement. As early as 1919, he had joined Constantin Pancu in his Garda Conştiinţei Naţionale, an association of workers, engaging in street battles with those whom they saw as Bolshevik agitators and drafting a political program which owed inspiration to the Austrian Christian Social Party and, possibly, to the DNSAP. In 1933, he was among those who condemned the repression of the Grivița Strike by the National Peasants' Party cabinet of Alexandru Vaida-Voevod. Nevertheless, Roger Griffin's analysis of the relations established between the Movement and the working class indicates that such interventions were marginal in respect to other goals set by Codreanu, and largely fruitless. In contrast, Codreanu himself is thought to have based his decision on the fact that industrial employees were already joining his grouping in relevant numbers.

Corpul Muncitoresc was created on October 25, 1936. The first of its units, centered in Azuga, was established in 1938. Soon afterwards, all working-class political cells (cuiburi, or "nests") withdrew from their affiliation with local structures, and were reunited inside the CML. Codreanu underlined the class' importance in the context of his ideology, and, through an appeal to the CML in particular and the proletariat in general, he indicated:

"In your fight, up to now, you have strayed on hundreds of slanting paths and you have been defeated. All your attempts have been crushed. This time around, you will vanquish under the Legionary symbol, your sacrifice will be rewarded with a reward of the victorious and the masters of a country."

=== Early trends ===
Various other statements of Legionary leaders clarified their intention to marginalize left-wing politics inside the labor movement, while making vague promises regarding social equality (appealing to "authentic workers", they indicated their refusal to accept "transforming the administrative and professional problem into a terrible political weapon", and proclaimed a will to balance the labor cause with capitalism, leading to a world were employers and employees would be "comrades"). Dumitru Groza, who expanded on the theme of Legionary workers being "masters of their own country", is known to have deemed Codreanu "the Messiah of the Romanian worker".

The Corps, coinciding with a peak in Iron Guard popularity and influence, as well as with the apex of interwar industrialization in Romania, signified a major shift in regard to recruitment policies. Before the period of persecution and Codreanu's killing (November 1938), it swelled in numbers. There are several views in respect to its overall importance inside the larger movement: according to Aurel Dragoş Munteanu, the Corps was the largest and most popular branch, while Francisco Veiga describes it as "an elite organization", and argues that its strength lay in determination rather than sheer numbers.

Initially, the CML made gains in the ranks of semi-skilled workers. Soon after, it came to draw much of its membership (around 8,000 people) from the industrial areas of Bucharest, most notably Grivița, and from the city's major employers (both in the services industry, with Societatea de Transport București, and in Nicolae Malaxa's factories). Veiga indicates that the organization had only marginal impact on the Prahova County, where the oil industry was centered.

It soon began organizing a series of leisure ventures, including several low-cost restaurants (one of them was maintained in Grivița), which also functioned as charity canteens for the poor. Following a model instituted by Opera nazionale dopolavoro in Fascist Italy, a number of campsites were set up, offering free vacationing to working-class children.

Following King Carol II's 1938 decision to monopolize stately power and the subsequent creation of the National Renaissance Front as the single ruling party, the CML remained active in the underground, but was much weakened and efficiently supervised by the secret police (Siguranţa Statului). It has also been argued that the Corps nonetheless gained political support, as an indirect consequence of Carol's similar move to outlaw all trade unions.

=== National Legionary State ===
Under the National Legionary State, created soon after Carol's fall in 1940 as a partnership between General Ion Antonescu (who took the title of Conducător) and the Iron Guard's Horia Sima, Dumitru Groza's CML was instated as an official institution, officially replacing all trade unions. It developed an autonomous structure, which included its own paramilitary wing (garnizoană), and rose to over 13,200 members in Bucharest. Advertised as a new social nucleus of the nation, the CML increased the number of its ventures, owning its own cinemas, and even criticized various employers for the treatment they offered to workers (which played a part in the proclamation of a theoretical minimum wage). At the time, the Iron Guard's Minister of Labor Vasile Iaşinschi was quoted as saying:

"among the workers today will be recruited the tomorrow's factory owners, if not in the first generation, at least in the second."

In autumn 1940, as tensions between the Guard and Antonescu escalated, the movement began appealing to Romanian Army personnel, in an attempt to draw support away from the military leaders. In the process, the CML and Ajutorul Legionar, the Guard's humanitarian venture, were depicted as evidence that the Sima's was the only political body capable of dealing with the social problems faced by soldiers. In parallel, the CML's paramilitary troops took part in waves of violence and repression, occasionally taking initiative; on November 26–27, 1940, together with Legionary sympathizers in the Romanian Police, it carried out the killings of former National Renaissance Front officials who were detained in Jilava.

The CML was among the main participants in the Legionary Rebellion of January 21, 1941, when the final clash with Antonescu took place. It also played a prominent part in the parallel pogrom, organizing a roundup of Jews. The Corps transported those captured to the forest in Jilava, where they were shot. Among those killed were the two sons of Rabbi Zvi Gutman (shots were also fired in Gutman's direction, as he laid down on the ground, but missed their target).

=== Aftermath ===
Although Antonescu singled out Dumitru Groza as one of the Rebellion leaders, Siguranţa Statului obtained the former CML's leader collaboration for much of World War II. In 1945, following Antonescu's downfall and the onset of Soviet occupation (see Romania during World War II), and the establishment of the Petru Groza executive, state authorities progressively came under control from the Romanian Communist Party. In the process, the factionalized and underground interior branch of the Iron Guard was approached by the Communist Party's Teohari Georgescu and Alexandru Nicolschi with an offer for a truce (evidence was also cited that the agreement was directly ordered by Soviet overseers). Such talks were mainly carried out with Nicolae Petraşcu, who claimed to represent the exiled leadership of Sima. Dumitru Groza's faction refused to partake in the deal.

During the Communist regime, established in 1948, the CML's impact in industrial areas of Bucharest was obscured, with the PCR claiming to have been the main agent of political agitation during the 1930s. As part of their conflict with Gheorghe Gheorghiu-Dej, both Ana Pauker and her associate Georgescu were accused of having orchestrated the enrollment of Legionaries in the Party (Pauker is known to have publicly welcomed former members of the Iron Guard on one occasion in 1945, and it has been argued that she took part in the actual negotiations).
