= Manya Botez =

Romanian pianist and children's music teacher

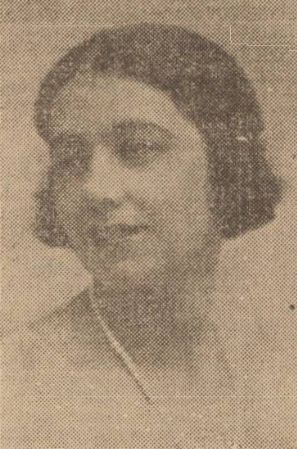
Manya Botez

Manya Botez (1896–1971) was a Romanian pianist and children's music teacher.

== Background and education ==
Manya Botez was born Mania Goldman, of Jewish parents, in Sulina. She studied in Berlin and in Paris, and taught in Berlin until 1939. She founded the "Manya Botez" Music School in Bucharest in 1930, where, in 1939, amongst her young pupils, was the Romanian composer Aurel Stroe (then aged 7). She returned to Romania at the outbreak of World War II. Later she taught at the Conservatoire de Paris and in London.

Botez was still actively teaching when she died in Richmond, London.

== Personal life ==
She was the second wife of Romanian writer Eugeniu Botez (known as Jean Bart), whom she married after his first wife, born Marioara Dumitrescu, died in 1913. They had a daughter, Ada Botez, in 1918. In 1926, the marriage ended in divorce, with Ada remaining in the custody of her father. Manya then married General Gheorghe Argeșanu, becoming Manya Botez Argeșanu, but kept her professional name Manya Botez.

== Publications ==
- Manya Botez, Musikalisches A.B.C. "(A Musical A.B.C.)", Romanian children's songs, Bucharest, 1937
