= Armand Călinescu =

Prime Minister of Romania in 1939

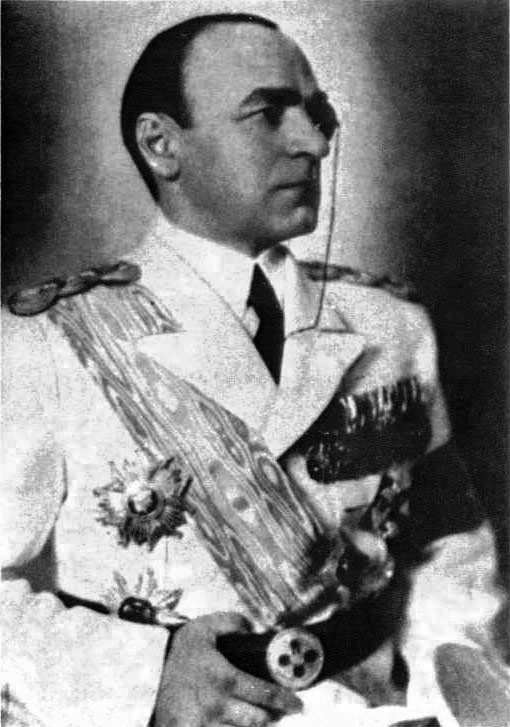
- Official portrait, 1939

39th Prime Minister of Romania
- In office 7 March 1939 – 21 September 1939
- Monarch: Carol II
- Preceded by: Miron Cristea
- Succeeded by: Gheorghe Argeșanu

Deputy Prime Minister
- In office 1 February 1939 – 6 March 1939
- Prime Minister: Miron Cristea

Minister of Interior
- In office 29 December 1937 – 21 September 1939
- Prime Minister: Octavian Goga; Miron Cristea; Himself
- Preceded by: Richard Franasovici
- Succeeded by: Gabriel Marinescu

Personal details
- Born: 4 June 1893 Pitești, Romania
- Died: 21 September 1939 (aged 46) Bucharest, Romania
- Cause of death: Assassination
- Resting place: Curtea de Argeș Monastery
- Party: Peasants' Party (1926); National Peasants' Party (1926–1937); Independent (1937–1938); National Renaissance Front (1938–1939)
- Spouse(s): Adela Călinescu (1895–1983) Children = Barbu Armand Calinescu. Grandchildren = Alexandra Calinescu & Marina Calinescu Rubin
- Education: University of Bucharest; University of Paris
- Profession: Economist

Armand Călinescu (4 June 1893 – 21 September 1939) was a Romanian economist and politician, who served as 39th Prime Minister from March 1939 until his assassination six months later. He was a staunch opponent of the fascist Iron Guard and may have been the real power behind the throne during the dictatorship of King Carol II. He survived several assassination attempts but was finally killed by members of the Iron Guard with German assistance.

== Biography ==
=== Early life ===
Călinescu was born in Pitești as the son of Mihai Călinescu, a Romanian Army veteran, and his wife Ecaterina, née Gherasim. Mihai Călinescu was a landowner and relatively wealthy man.

Călinescu attended secondary school and high school in his native city at Ion Brătianu High School. Between 1912 and 1918 he studied Law and Philosophy at the University of Bucharest, before taking a PhD in Economics and Political Sciences at the Faculty of Law and Economics from the University of Paris, with a thesis on Le change roumain. Sa dépreciation depuis la guerre et son rétablissement ("The Romanian Exchange Rate. Its Depreciation Since the War and Its Recovery").

=== PȚ and PNȚ ===
Initially, Călinescu intended to enter the political scene as a member of the dominant National Liberal Party (PNL), but his views on politics were rejected by its leader Ion I. C. Brătianu. Instead, he joined the Peasants' Party (PȚ), a rising opposition group, falling under the influence of Ion Mihalache. He was first elected to office in 1926, as one of the 38 PŢ deputies in opposition to the second Alexandru Averescu cabinet, and was reelected for consecutive terms until 1937.

After the PȚ merged with the Romanian National Party to create the National Peasants' Party (PNȚ), he stood on the group's left wing, together with Mihai Ralea, Ernest Ene, Mihail Ghelmegeanu, Petre Andrei and Nicolae L. Lupu. He was the PNȚ local leader for Argeș County and, when the party came to power with the Iuliu Maniu cabinet in 1928, served as prefect of Argeș before being appointed general secretary to the Ministry of Agriculture by Mihalache (who was titular Minister). In 1930, he was appointed Under Secretary of State in the Alexandru Vaida-Voevod-led Ministry of the Interior.

In the latter capacity, Călinescu oversaw actions against the illegal Communist Party: he ordered the troops to carry out arrests of suspected agitators after the miners' strike in Lupeni, and ordered troops to open fire on demonstrators during the Grivița strike of 1933, leading to the deaths of seven workers.

His equally firm opposition to the fast rise of the fascist Iron Guard (the Legionnaires, a group he helped outlaw in January 1931), contributed to the fall of the 1933 Vaida-Voevod government of which Călinescu was a member. The Guard's leader, Corneliu Zelea Codreanu, had by then issued intimidating replies in the far right press.

In opposition to the Gheorghe Tătărescu PNL cabinet, Călinescu warned against the latter's tolerant stance toward the Legionnaires, especially after the murder of Ion G. Duca in December 1933 and the desecration of his memorial plate in 1936 ("The Iron Guard is not a movement of the [public] opinion, but rather an association of assassins and foul profaners of tombs").

=== Carol's minister ===
A staunch ally of France and the United Kingdom and a steadfast adversary of the Iron Guard movement in Romania, Călinescu also supported King Carol II's move to counter the Iron Guard's success; he first confronted the PNȚ leadership during the elections of 1937, after it signed an electoral agreement with the Iron Guard. Eventually, he defied his party by becoming Minister of the Interior after December of that year, in the short-lived Octavian Goga cabinet formed by the National Christians, being immediately expelled from the PNȚ.

He began preparing himself for the confrontation with the Iron Guard. While organizing the early elections of March 1938, he took steps to limit the Guard's propaganda machine, and closed down all press linked to the Guard, causing violent clashes between the movement and representatives of state authorities.

Călinescu remained in office during the royal dictatorship established by King Carol in 1937, serving as vice-premier under Miron Cristea. According to historian Joseph Rothschild, he was actually the real power in the government. He was also a founding member of the National Renaissance Front (FRN) created by as the sole legal party in December 1938, and was generally seen as very close to Carol. He soon became involved in a virulent dispute with historian Nicolae Iorga, when the latter issued harsh criticism regarding Carol's January 1939 initiative to dress large sections of the society, including Romanian Academy members, in various uniforms (a measure backed by Călinescu); Iorga remarked with irony: "I'm prepared to wear the FRN uniform, but allow me to wear a speared helmet on my head, on which to place [that is, to impale] the Minister of the Interior". Eventually (in May of the same year), Iorga gave in to the demands and became a supporter of the regime.

In May, after witnessing the result of German pressure on Austria (see Anschluss), Călinescu decapitated the Guard by ordering arrests of its leaders, beginning with that of Codreanu, as well as many of its members and sympathisers (including Nae Ionescu and Mircea Eliade). Codreanu and other leaders (probably as much as 300 people) were consequently killed in custody; ostensibly because they were "killed while trying to escape". Other Legionaries were pressured to sign "declarations of dissociation". Many other Guard leaders, including Horia Sima, fled to various locations in Germany.

On 7 March 1939, after brief stints as Minister of Health and Minister of Education, he replaced Cristea as Premier upon his death, being considered the "man of steel" able to prevent the Iron Guard's political rise and to keep Romania out of the pro-German war camp (the nickname "The Man of Steel" probably originated, under the form l'homme d'acier, in essays written by the French journalists Jérôme and Jean Tharaud on Romanian topics). However, he had been Prime Minister in all but name since February, when he was granted extensive powers in the wake of Cristea's illness. Călinescu was also Minister of the Interior and Minister of Defense. In September of that year, after the invasion of Poland, certain members of Iron Guard alleged that Călinescu and the King Carol planned with the British Intelligence services to blow up the Prahova oil fields, preventing Germany from taking control and using them. Armand Călinescu allowed the Polish Government-in-Exile and civilians to take refuge in Romania and also ordered Romanian trains to be sent to Poland to evacuate Polish national treasures, which were sent to England from the Romanian port of Constanța, an action which made the Third Reich very angry with the Romanian Government.

== Death ==
Călinescu was shot dead on 21 September 1939 in Bucharest by Iron Guard members under the direct leadership of Sima. This was the last of several assassination attempts, including an attack on the Romanian Athenaeum and bombing a bridge over the Dâmbovița River, both of which were thwarted by the police.

It seems that the action was carried out with German approval and assistance.

== Legacy ==
The vast majority of sources reacting to the events made ample mention of German backing for Călinescu's killers, with the exception of German media. German sources alleged that Polish and British political forces had supported the assassination as a means to pressure Romania into abandoning its neutrality, a version that was supported by, among others, Hans Fritzsche.

A more severe repression of the Iron Guard followed under the provisional leadership of Gheorghe Argeșanu and was inaugurated by the immediate execution of the assassins and the public display of their bodies at the murder site for days on end. A placard was set up on the spot, reading De acum înainte, aceasta va fi soarta trădătorilor de țară ("From now on, this shall be the fate of those who betray the country"). Students from several Bucharest secondary schools were required to visit the site (based on the belief that would dissuade them from affiliating with the Guard). Executions of known Iron Guard activists were ordered in various places in the country (some were hanged on telegraph poles, while a group of Legionnaires was shot in front of Ion G. Duca's statue in Ploiești); in all, over 300 members of the Iron Guard were killed without trial. Călinescu was succeeded by Marinescu as Minister of the Interior and by Ioan Ilcuș as Minister of Defense.

One year later, under the National Legionary State (the Iron Guard's government), Marinescu and Argeșanu, alongside other politicians, were executed at Jilava Prison (September 1940); it was also at that time that the Călinescu family crypt in Curtea de Argeș was dynamited, and a bronze bust of him which awaited unveiling was chained and dragged through the streets of Pitești. Călinescu's wife Adela was required to hand all of her husband's personal documents and, in a letter to Conducător Ion Antonescu, claimed to have been repeatedly harassed by agents of Siguranța Statului.
