= Conducător =

Title of Romanian dictator Ion Antonescu during WWII

Conducător of Romania

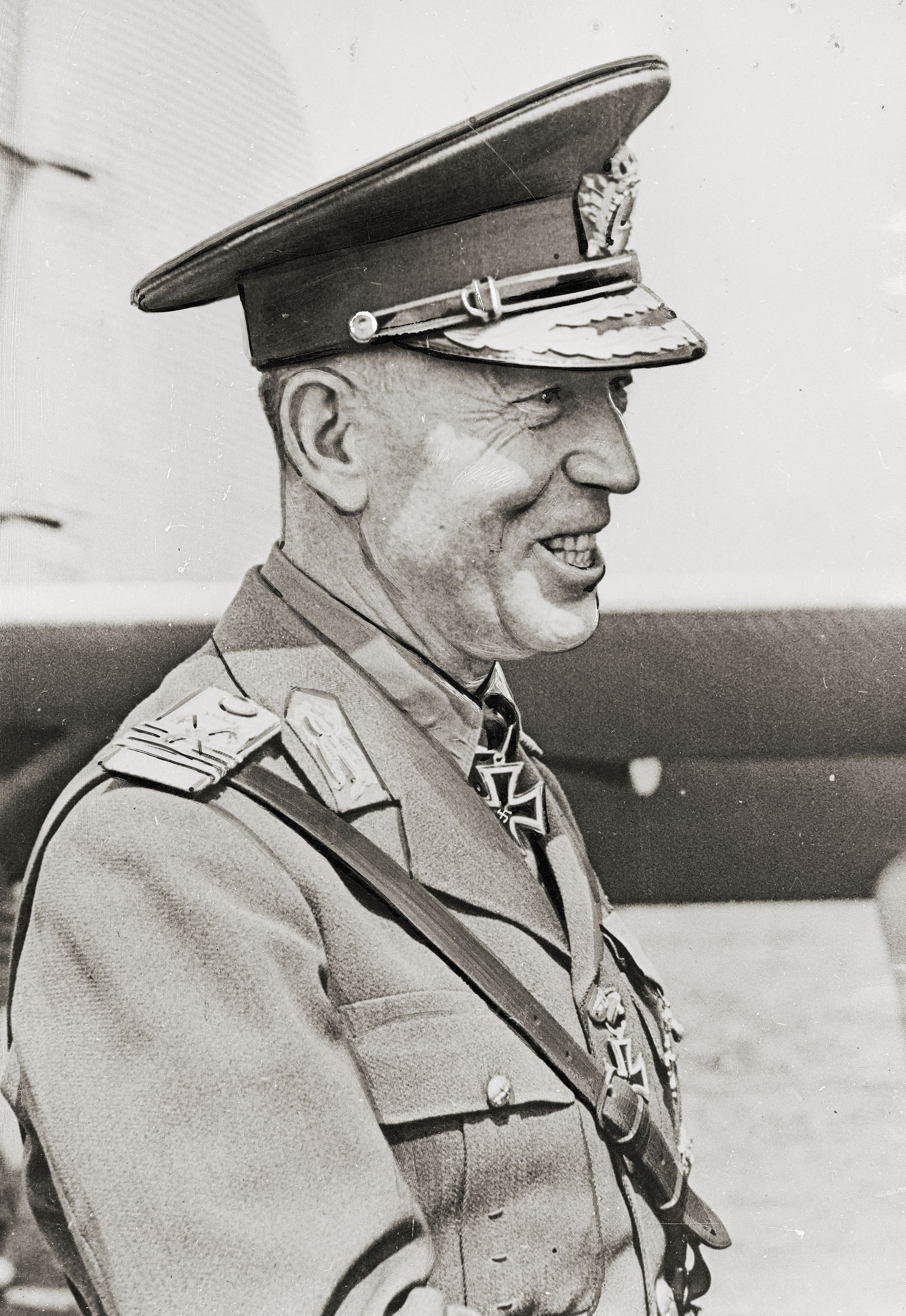
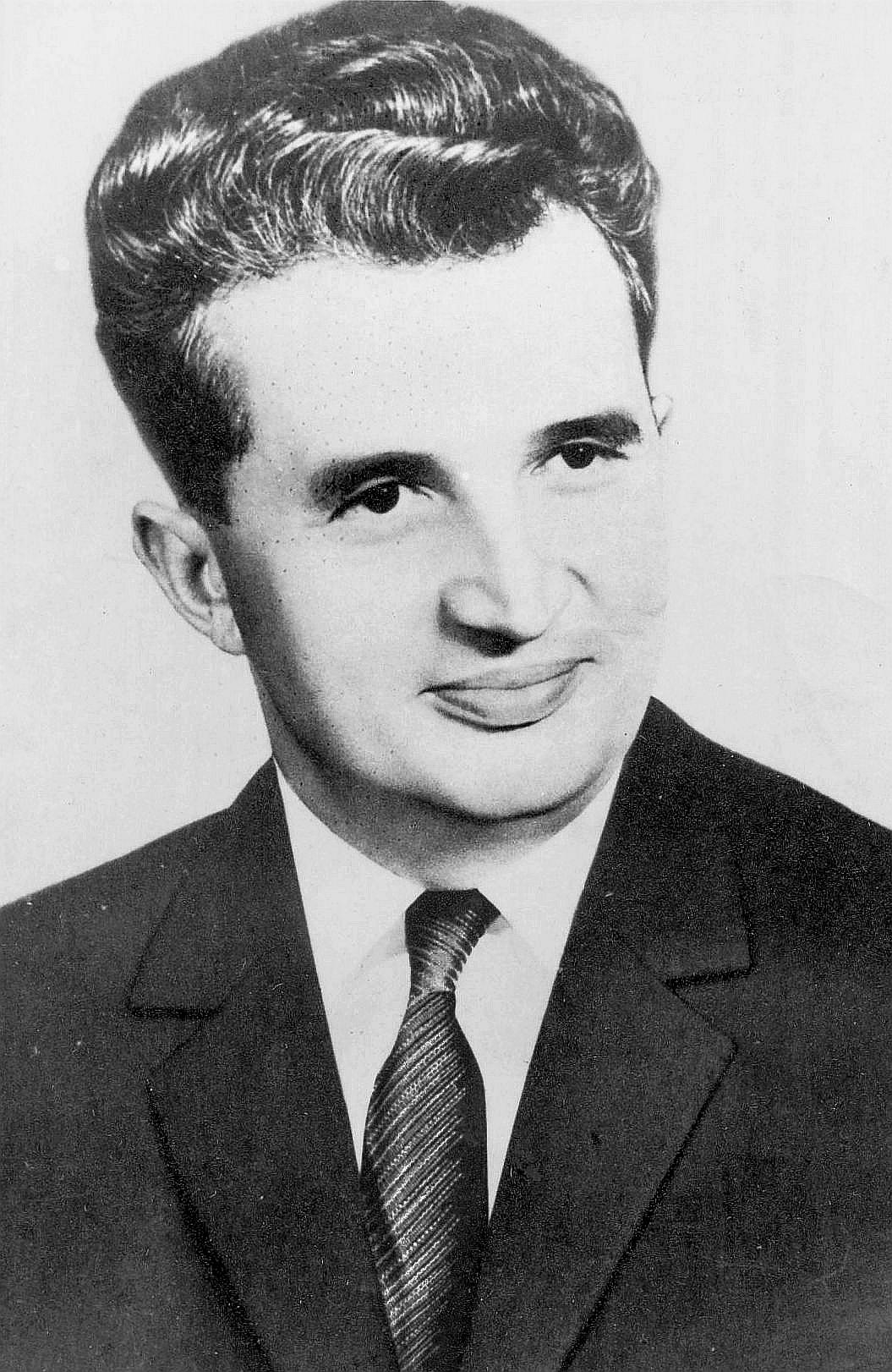
- Best known users of the title: Ion Antonescu (above); 5/6 September 1940 – 23 August 1944; Nicolae Ceaușescu (below); 6 July 1971 – 22 December 1989

Conducător (Romanian: [kondukəˈtor], meaning 'Leader') was the title used officially by Romanian dictator Ion Antonescu during World War II, also occasionally used in official discourse to refer to Carol II and Nicolae Ceaușescu.

== History ==
The word is derived from the Romanian verb a conduce, from the Latin ducere ("to lead" or, "to drive" in Romanian), cognate with such titles as dux, duke, duce and doge. Its meaning also parallels other titles, such as Führer in Nazi Germany, Duce in Fascist Italy and Caudillo in Francoist Spain.

It was first employed as an additional title by King Carol II during the final years of the National Renaissance Front regime, and soon after employed by Marshal Ion Antonescu as he assumed dictatorial powers after September 14, 1940. Nominally, Antonescu was Prime Minister and the role of head of state was filled by King Michael, but all real power rested with Antonescu. According to historian Adrian Cioroianu, through the use of the term, Antonescu meant to highlight connections with Germany, and after the fall of the Iron Guard from shared government (the National Legionary State), his own personal regime.

The term was occasionally used in official discourse as a reference to Nicolae Ceaușescu, leader of the Socialist Republic of Romania, starting in the period after 1971, at a time when the Romanian Communist Party grew in membership but decreased in importance due to Ceaușescu's increasing personality cult. It was used in parallel with the rarer cârmaci ("helmsman"), in turn borrowed from similar rhetoric as North Korea under Kim Il Sung and China under Mao Zedong after his visit to both countries in June 1971, as well as in parallel to caudillismo of anti-colonial Latin American leaders whom he met such as Fidel Castro of Cuba and Juan Perón of Argentina. While references to the Party as the "vanguard of the working class" fell out of use, power became centered on Ceauşescu's prerogative to issue orders to the political apparatus.

The choice of the term was also meant to highlight a symbolic connection with the Princes of Wallachia and the Princes of Moldavia (another comparison in use was that between Ceaușescu and the Dacian leaders of Antiquity). Additionally, during the same period, Communist sources began depicting Antonescu in a favorable light. Starting from a model applied to the entire Eastern Bloc by Polish political scientist Andrzej Korboński, differentiating Communist leaderships in types of primus inter pares (collective leadership) and primus (personal rule), Cioroianu concluded that Romania's choice for the latter alternative was most likely based on local political tradition. In Cioroianu's view, Ceaușescu's system drew its other major source of legitimacy from political clientelism (resulting in what he called "an orbital political system").

The new political relations, largely based on the Conducător's charisma, were likened to various other dictatorial regimes of the 20th century, and included by Houchang Esfandiar Chehabi and Juan José Linz among the various "Sultanistic regimes" – the title itself has drawn comparisons with other ones created by dictatorial leaders for themselves: Aryamehr (used by Iran's Mohammad Reza Pahlavi), Mobutu Sese Seko Kuku Ngbendu Wa Za Banga (in Joseph-Désiré Mobutu's Zaire), the Imperial designation of Central Africa (under Jean-Bédel Bokassa), Benefactor de la Patria (imposed by Rafael Leónidas Trujillo in the Dominican Republic), and Conqueror of the British Empire etc. (in Idi Amin's Uganda).

== Influence ==
Several Serbian sources have repeatedly alleged that the Croatian politician Ivan "Stevo" Krajačić, a member of the League of Communists of Croatia inside Communist Yugoslavia and a confidant of President Josip Broz Tito, was an active campaigner for Croatian independence. Among other allegations, Krajačić was accused of having adopted the nickname "Conducător of Separatism", as a compliment to Ceaușescu's dictatorial stance.

== See also ==
- Führer
- Duce
- Caudillo
- Poglavnik
- Fører
