= Gheorghe Argeșanu =

Romanian general (1883–1940)

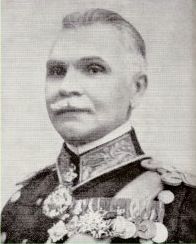
- Argeșanu in the 1930s

40th Prime Minister of Romania
- In office 21 September 1939 – 28 September 1939
- Monarch: Carol II
- Preceded by: Armand Călinescu
- Succeeded by: Constantin Argetoianu

Minister of National Defence
- In office 30 March 1938 – 13 October 1938
- Monarch: Carol II
- Prime Minister: Miron Cristea
- Preceded by: Ion Antonescu
- Succeeded by: Nicolae Ciupercă

Personal details
- Born: 28 February 1883 Caracal, Romania
- Died: 26 November 1940 (aged 57) Jilava Prison, Romania
- Cause of death: Execution
- Resting place: Ghencea Cemetery, Bucharest
- Spouse: Manya Botez
- Education: University of Bucharest
- Occupation: Soldier, politician
- Awards: Order of the Star of Romania, 1st Class

Military service
- Allegiance: Kingdom of Romania
- Branch/service: Cavalry, Romanian Land Forces
- Years of service: 1903–1940
- Rank: General de divizie
- Unit: 3rd Regiment Roșiori, 2nd Regiment Călărași, 2nd Infantry Division, 4th Infantry Division, 2nd Cavalry Division
- Commands: 2nd Regiment Călărași, Guards Division
- Battles/wars: Second Balkan War; World War I; Romanian campaign; Hungarian–Romanian War

Gheorghe Argeșanu (28 February 1883 – 26/27 November 1940) was a Romanian cavalry general and politician who served as Prime Minister of Romania for about a week in September 1939.

== Biography ==
Born in Caracal, he was promoted to a leadership position in the Romanian Army during World War I, and served as the first Romanian military attaché to Japan (1921–1922) and as Minister of Defense in the second Miron Cristea cabinet (March–October 1938).

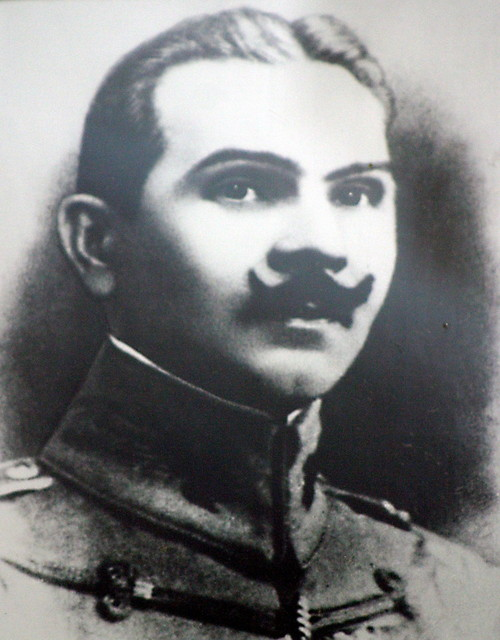
Gheorghe Argeșanu in the 1910s

Argeșanu was appointed as premier by King Carol II after the assassination of his predecessor Armand Călinescu by the nationalist Iron Guard, and promoted to the rank of Lieutenant General. His first noted measures included the public display of the bodies of Călinescu's assassins (who had been killed by orders from Horia Sima) and the arbitrary arrest and execution without trial of at least three Iron Guard members in each county. Over 300 legionnaires were summarily executed in reprisal for Călinescu's assassination. He was replaced as premier by Constantin Argetoianu. In June 1940, he was awarded the Order of the Star of Romania, 1st Class.

== Death ==
Immediately after the establishment of the Iron Guard's National Legionary State in September 1940, Argeșanu himself was imprisoned without trial in the Jilava Prison, and ultimately killed there during the Jilava massacre by members of the Iron Guard on the same night together with 63 other political prisoners, in retaliation for the violence he had endorsed.

Argeșanu was married to the pianist Manya Botez.
