= Ion Valeriu Emilian =

Romanian Politician

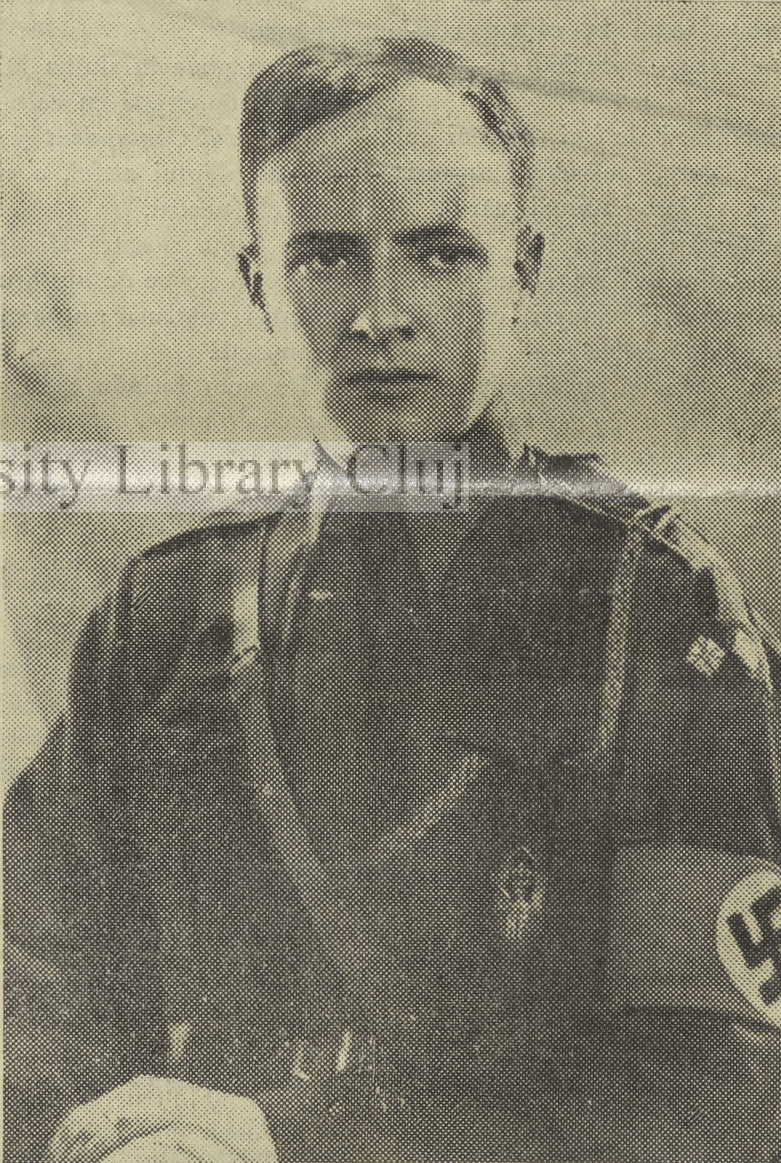
- Born: December 14, 1906; Craiova, Dolj, Kingdom of Romania
- Died: July 6, 1985; Munich, West Germany
- Occupation: Politician
- Known for: Founder of the Swastika of Fire
- Notable work: The Knights of the Apocalypse
- Political party: National-Christian Defense League (?-1935) Swastika of Fire (1935–1938)

Ion Valeriu Emilian; (Romanian: [jˈon valˈeɾi͡ʊ ˌemiljˈan]; 14 December 1906 – 6 July 1985) was a Fascist Romanian politician, commander of the Lăncieri and the founder of the Swastika of Fire, an ultranationalist organization active in the 1930s. With the dissolution of his political party following the Self-coup of Carol II of Romania, Emilian volunteered on the Eastern Front during Operation Barbarossa. A cavalry captain during the war, he then went on to publish The Knights of the Apocalypse, a book relating the course of the war.

== Biography ==
=== Early life ===
Ion Valeriu Emilian was born in Craiova on 14 December 1906. His paternal grandfather, Ștefan Emilian, was a teacher of Avram Iancu, whereas his mother originated from a family of independent farmers from South Moldova. He finished Sf. Iosif High School, followed by the Military High School hosted at Dealu Monastery. Under pressure from his family, he pursued a career as a lawyer instead of becoming an active officer.

=== National-Christian Defense League and PNC ===
Emilian was active in the ranks of the National-Christian Defense League, contributing to publications such as Porunca Vremii. He was the commander of the "Blue Shirts" (colloquially known as the Lăncieri), the paramilitary wing of the LANC Youth organization before the merger with Octavian Goga's National Agrarian Party. During the short Goga-Cuza government, Emilian was named prefect of Neamț. As prefect, Emilian supposedly refused orders from Istrate Micescu, at that time the minister of foreign affairs to assassinate Corneliu Zelea Codreanu.

=== Leader of the SDF ===
Viewing of the merger of the LANC and PNA as an act of Political opportunism and being dissatisfied with the naming of Nichifor Crainic as commander of the Blue Shirts, Emilian would go on to form Swastika of Fire. Due to the party's association with the Lăncieri, they inherited the "Blue Shirts" nickname in Siguranța reports. In its early phase, the SDF's symbolism minimally differed from that of the LANC, given its continued use of blue shirts shortly after breaking away. By late 1936 and onward, its symbolism included brown shirts, brown peaked caps and berets, diagonal belts, and, similar to the LANC, the tricolor armband featuring a swastika with inverted colors: a blue armband, a yellow circle, and a red swastika positioned at the center of the circle. According to a Siguranța report from 5 October 1936, the party's membership in Bucharest was that of 200 "punks", mostly homeless and, "in the best case, street vendors". By 1937, some intellectuals and professors joined the ranks of the party.

==== Ideology and relation to other movements ====
The SDF espoused national socialism, fascism and Germanophilia, while also empathizing Romanian Orthodox Christianity.

The merger of the LANC with the PNA was seen as a "suicide" in the eyes of the SDF. Reasons given for breaking away from the PNC include the party's less radical platform compared to that of the LANC as well as the claim that the LANC has been infiltrated by a "Trojan Horse" of Freemasonry. It was claimed that not long before the merger, LANC began accepting "suspicious" members who later facilitated the merger, most likely referring to Nichifor Crainic. By the end of 1937, Emilian hoped to return to his former party. He sought to integrate his party as an elite assault and protection squad for its leaders, mainly inspired by the Schutzstaffel. The merger of the two parties never occurred.

Emilian kept cordial relations with Corneliu Zelea Codreanu, a former colleague from their times in the LANC, and even participated in the swearing in of the first legionaries in 1927. He found the event ridiculous, rather than solemn. The SDF would later shortly declare itself in conflict with the Legion of Archangel Michael, especially after Codreanu refused to collaborate with Emilian's organization. In contrast, the shared rivalry of both movements with the LANC and the PNC could justify their amicable relations.

=== Military career ===
Emilian volunteered in the Romanian Armed Forces as a reserve officer of the 2 Călărași regiment, mainly composed out of natives of Romanați County. He named his horse "Dac", in reference to the Dacians. A fighter both during Operation Barbarossa and after Romania joined the Allied Powers, he claims to have received the Order of Michael the Brave, Iron Cross and the "Pabela" Soviet medal. Emilian felt "shame" after turning his arms against the Axis Powers, claiming that he had "died" after the suicidal assault on Silicka Planina. On the 17th of January 1945, he surrendered to the German 4th Mountain Division. Believed to be dead, he claimed he was decorated post-mortem with the Order of Bogdan Khmelnitsky and the "Victoria" medal.

=== Post-War activity ===
Emilian reached Vienna, where he joined a "National Romanian Government" under Horia Sima. At the start of the Cold War, Emilian collaborated with the Counterintelligence Corps. Due to his ties to American intelligence, he claimed to have become a target of the NKVD, which allegedly tried to assassinate him in 1950 and 1956 respectively. His brother, Marcel Emilian, was allegedly executed on 13 December 1949.

Starting from 1953, Emilian began publishing Stindardul, a newspaper which managed to release 154 issues. In 1973, he wrote „Les Cavaliers de l’Apocalypse” (The Knights of the Apocalypse) in collaboration with Jean Marcilly, as he believed that he has not yet mastered the French language. By 1977, the book was also published in Germany.

Emilian was accused of being a Securitate informant.

=== Death ===
Emilian passed away on 6 July 1985. He was buried in the Furstenfeldbruck cemetery. Some 200 people were present at the burial.
