= Swastika of Fire =

Romanian interwar nazi party, 1935–1938

Swastika of Fire (Fire Swastika) Svastica de Foc (SDF)
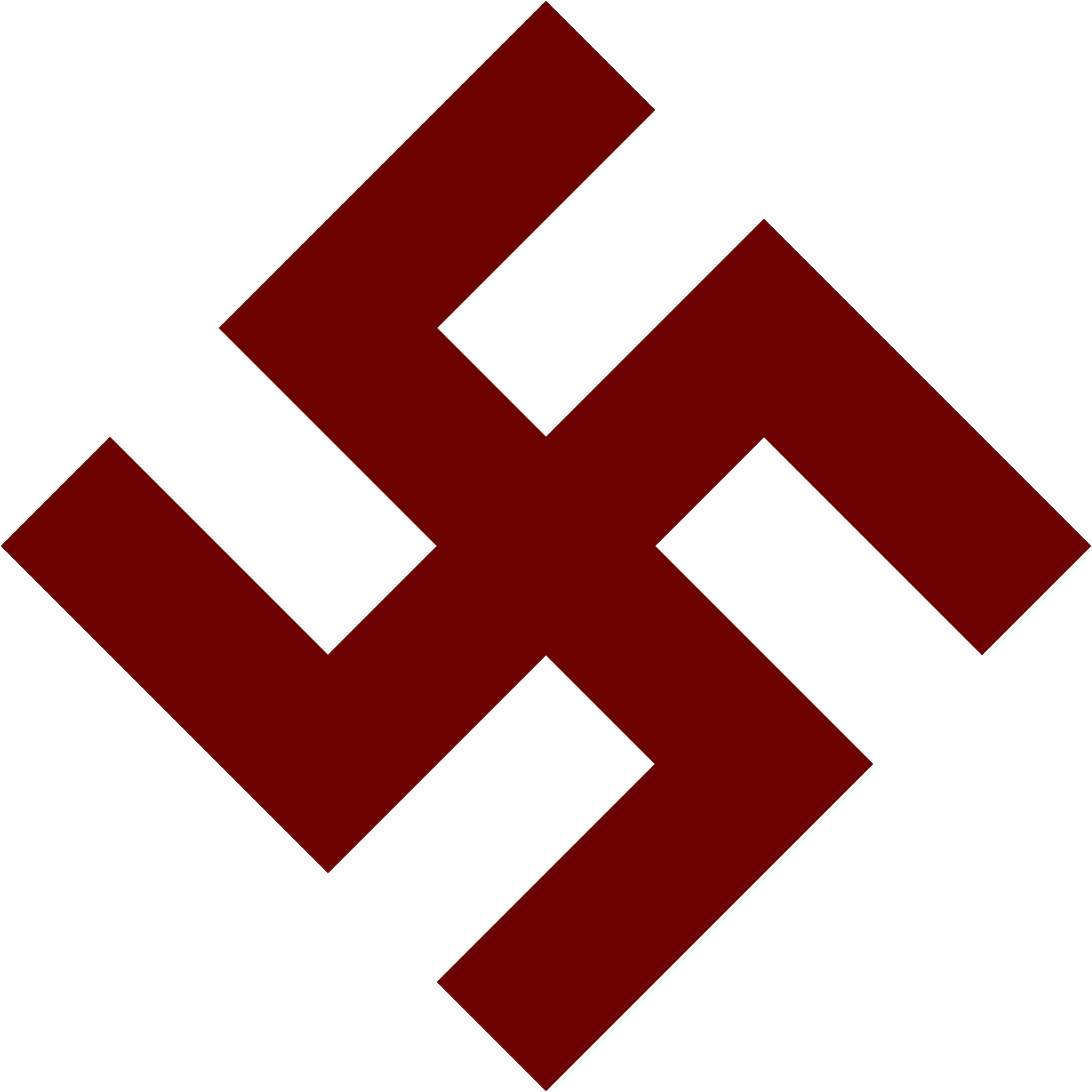
- Founder: Ion Valeriu Emilian
- Founded: 14 November 1935; 90 years ago
- Dissolved: 27 February 1938; 88 years ago
- Split from: National Christian Party
- Newspaper: Svastica de Foc (1935-1938)
- Ideology: Nazism
- Political position: Far-right
- Religion: Romanian Orthodoxy
- Slogan: Trăiască Svastica de Foc! ("Long live the Swastika of Fire!")

Election symbol
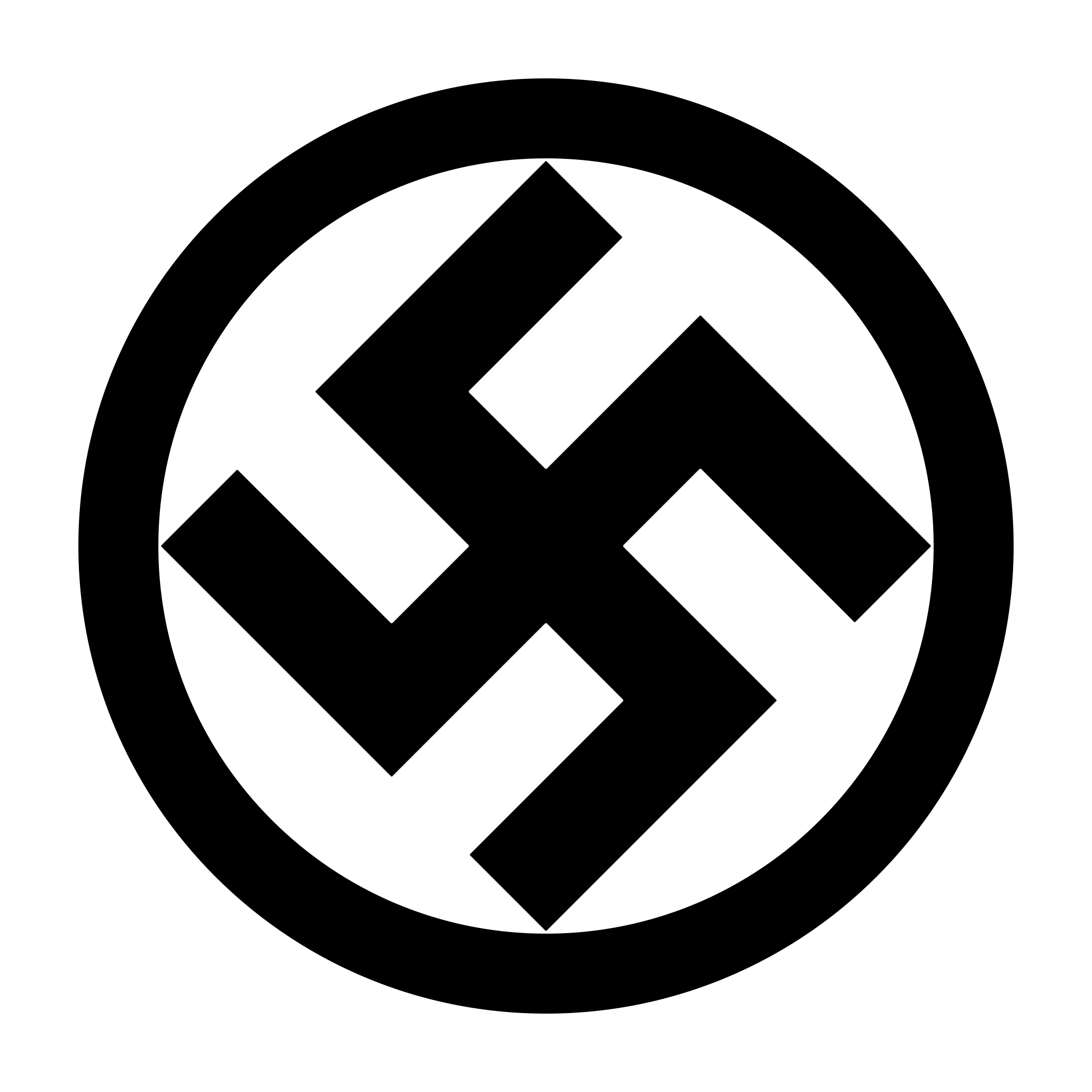

Party flag
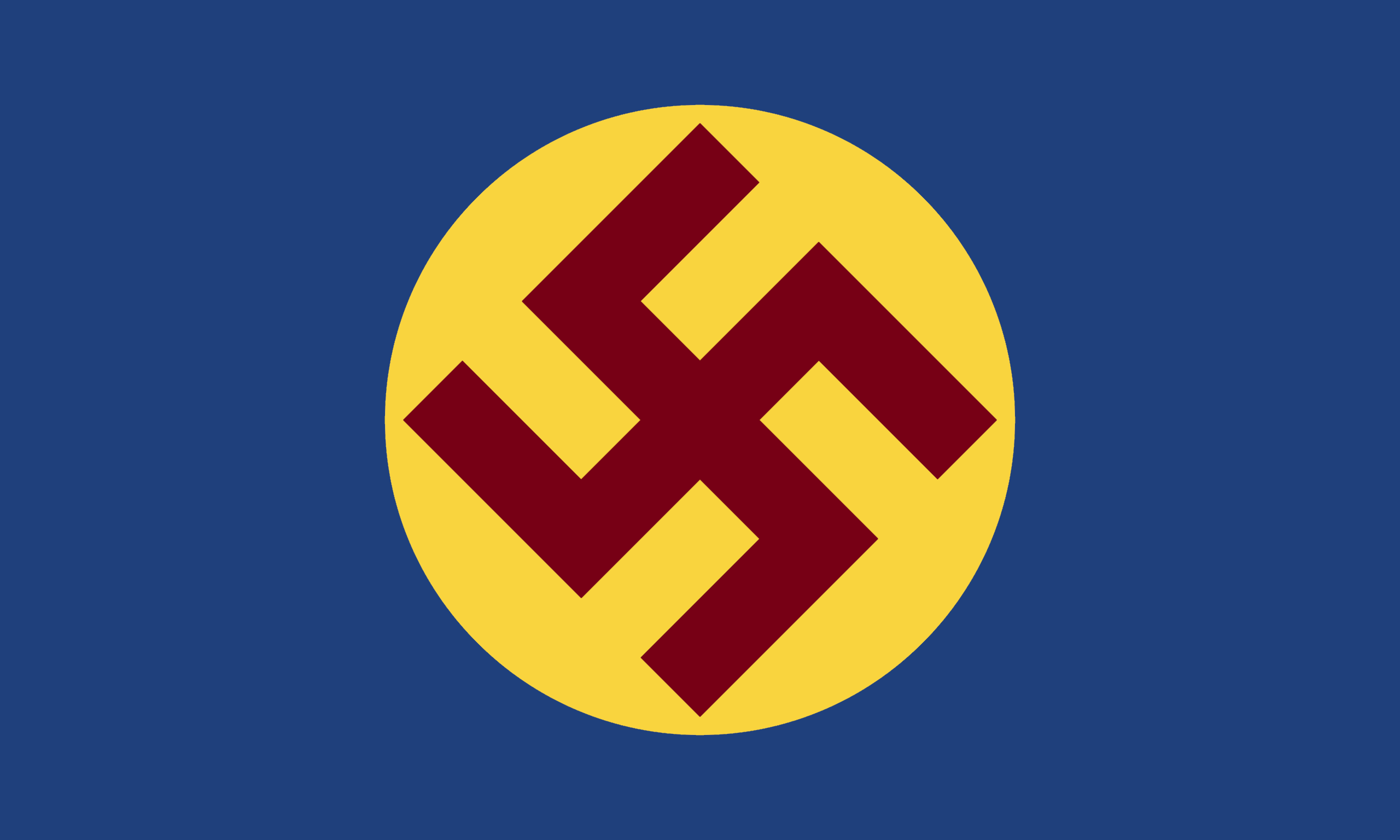

Swastika of Fire (also Fire Swastika; Romanian: Svastica de Foc, or SDF), colloquially known as the "Blue Shirts" (due to their prior association with the National Christian Party's youth paramilitary organization), and later as the "Brown Shirts" a customary inspired by the Nazi paramilitary Sturmabteilung (SA), was an interwar Nazi political party in the Kingdom of Romania that split from the National Christian Party. Ideologically-wise, the SDF espoused national socialism, fascism, Germanophilia, and Romanian Orthodox Christianity. Historian Francisco Veiga briefly described the SDF as "another copy of the NSDAP".

== History ==
=== Origins ===
The National Christian Party (PNC) had been formed in 1935 through the merger of Octavian Goga's National Agrarian Party (PNA) and A. C. Cuza's National-Christian Defense League (LANC). Nichifor Crainic, a prominent ultranationalist ideologue and future vice president of the PNC, was reportedly involved in a secret agreement with Octavian Goga to facilitate a merger with LANC, which was supposedly the reason he left the Iron Guard to join LANC in February 1935 in the first place. According to researcher Roland Clark, at one point the National Christian Party had become a tool for Crainic to promote a new political party he intended to found — the Christian Workers' Party.

A. C. Cuza, the president of LANC, frequently used anti-politicking rhetoric and claimed to oppose political opportunism. He attempted to distinguish LANC from traditional political parties by describing it as a "fraternal fellowship"; thus, Cuza continued, "it's a league, not a party". Traditional parties were described by Cuza as tools of the "enemy" of the Romanian people – the Jews. According to him, these parties were allegedly funded through Jewish subsidies and therefore served Jewish interests rather than those of ethnic Romanians. The SDF would also adopt this stance, describing itself as a "fraternal fellowship" rather than a party.

In itself, this claim was populist and hypocritical, as the merger of LANC with the PNA was largely opportunistic, and Cuza himself had acted opportunistically on several other occasions. This was later pointed out in issues of the SDF's newspaper, which bore the same name – Svastica de Foc. Furthermore, Goga sponsored Cuza's candidacy for membership in the Romanian Academy in order to appeal to his ego.

=== I. V. Emilian and the founding of the SDF ===
The merger dissatisfied several of the LANC's older leaders, including Ion Valeriu Emilian — commander of the "Blue Shirts" (colloquially known as the Lăncieri), the paramilitary wing of the LANC Youth organization prior to the merger — who began opposing Octavian Goga. After the merger, command of the Blue Shirts was handed over to Nichifor Crainic, further dissatisfying Emilian. Subsequently, Emilian began provoking incidents that undermined the integrity of the PNC. In October 1935, Crainic, then vice president of the PNC, removed Emilian and other dissidents from the party, after which Emilian went on to found the SDF on 14 November 1935.

I. V. Emilian, a lawyer and cavalry captain in the Romanian Army, had been a LANC militant since the movement's founding in the 1920s. In his post–World War II memoir, "Cavalerii Apocalipsei" (English: "The Knights of the Apocalypse"), he nostalgically recalls his "crazy youth" as a LANC militant. After the founding of the SDF, Emilian held on to the hope of returning to his former party, where he had once served as commander of the blue-shirted Lăncieri.

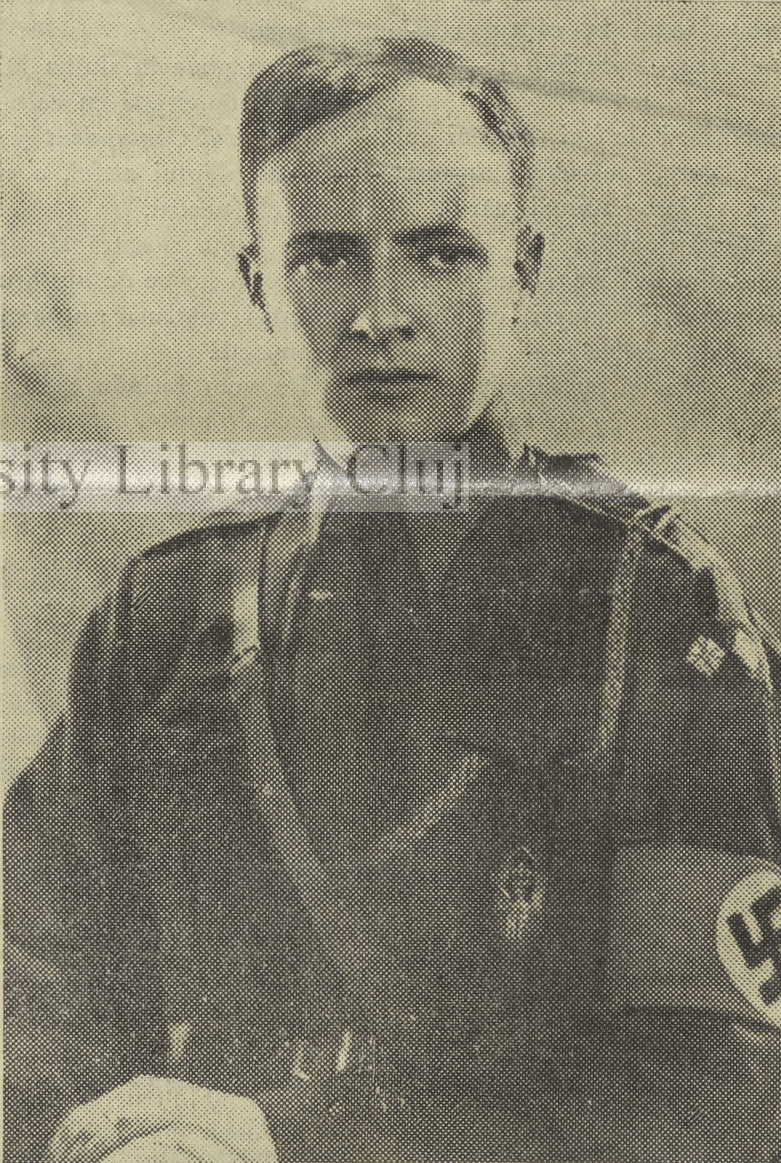
I. V. Emilian, the leader of the SDF, wearing the organization's uniform, 1936.

The merger of LANC was seen as a "suicide" by the SDF. In the first issue of the Svastica de Foc newspaper, among the reasons given for breaking away from the PNC — such as political opportunism and its less radical platform compared to that of LANC — was the claim that LANC had been broken apart by a "Trojan Horse" of the Freemasonry, which had supposedly infiltrated nationalist organizations for that very purpose. Furthermore, it was claimed that not long before the merger, LANC began accepting more or less "suspicious" members who later facilitated the merger; this likely referred to Nichifor Crainic, who had indeed negotiated and facilitated the merger. For his involvement in the merger, some political scientists consider Crainic a "royal executor", given King Carol II's ambition to create a party that would serve his interests.

=== Identity shaping ===
In reports of the Siguranța and newspapers publications, SDF members were referred to as the "Blue Shirts" or the "Blue Shirts group", most likely due to their prior association with the blue-shirted Lăncieri of the PNC — already notorious for their activity in LANC between 1923 and 1935, during which they carried out more pogroms and exorbitant antisemitic violence across Romania than the Iron Guard.

In its early phase, the SDF's symbolism hardly differed from that of the LANC, given its continued use of blue shirts shortly after breaking away. By late 1936 and onward, its symbolism included brown shirts, brown peaked caps and berets, diagonal belts, and, similar to the LANC, the tricolor armband featuring the swastika — although with inverted colors: a blue armband, a yellow circle, and a red swastika positioned at the center of the circle.

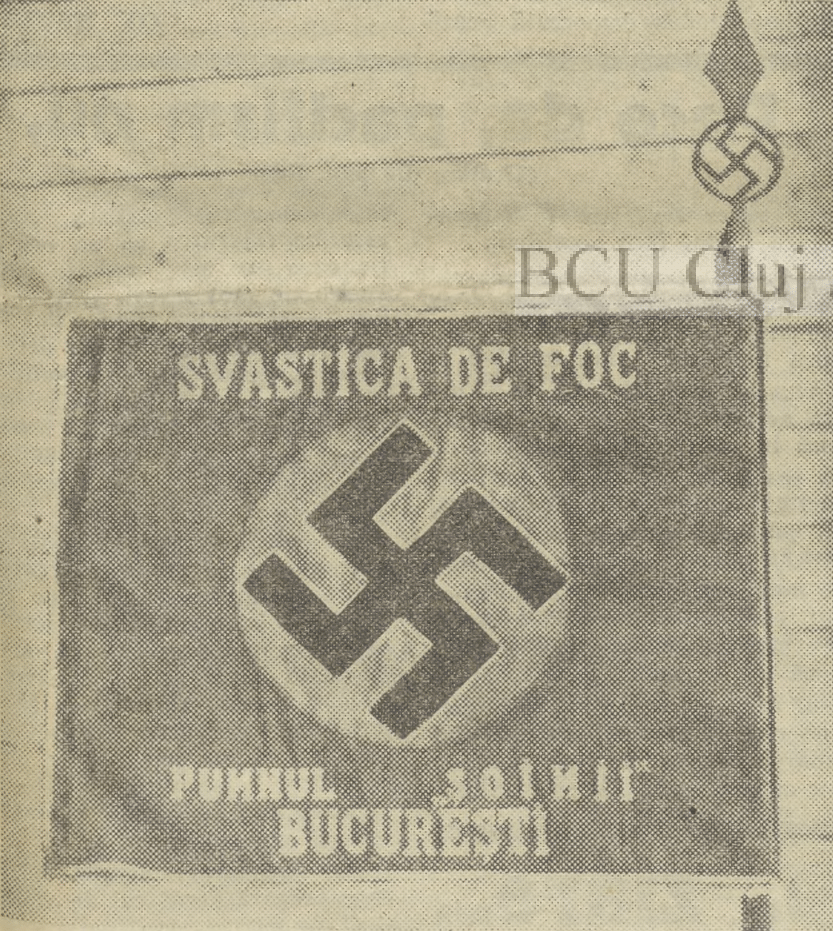
SDF flag of the "Șoimii" (English: The Hawks) Fist from Bucharest. The colors were as follows: blue field, yellow circle, and a red swastika in the center.

Beginning in 1933, several organizations officially adopted uniforms inspired by the German Nazi paramilitaries, a practice that continued until the ban of political uniforms in March 1937. Violent acts committed by the Iron Guard and LANC were sometimes misattributed by the authorities — possibly the case here as well, as the authorities may have initially perceived the SDF as merely rogue Blue Shirts of the PNC, before the group began shaping its own identity and formally organizing as the Swastika of Fire on 14 November 1935.

The newspaper of the National Peasants' Party, Patria (English: The Motherland), reported on the ban of political uniforms on 4 March 1937 and listed the colors associated with each organization: "Black shirts (vaidists), blue (cuzists), green (legionaries), white (archers), yellow (avarescians), brown (Swastika of Fire), violet (National Guard), carmine (Crusade of Romanianism) and red (Democrat Youth)."

=== Membership, organization, and activity ===
A Siguranța report from 5 October 1936 on the Swastika of Fire's Bucharest branch claimed that it comprised circa 200 "punks" of unknown occupation, mostly homeless and, "in the best case, ambulant merchants", who roamed the streets selling the organization's newspapers. According to researchers D. Beldiman and C. Beldiman, however, the organization had somewhat of a positive evolution in regard to its membership, as by the end of 1937 it also included numerous intellectuals and renowned professors.

One notable member was the writer and diplomat Vintilă Horia, a close collaborator of Nichifor Crainic, who contributed to periodicals directed by him, such as Porunca Vremii and Sfarmă Piatră. During the Antonescu regime, Vintilă was accused of legionary activity and investigated by the Siguranță; he declared that he had been part of LANC's youth wing in 1934 but claimed to have ceased all involvement after the merger of LANC with the PNA. In further investigations carried out by the communist Securitate after World War II, his cousin stated at Aiud Prison on 4 January 1964 that Vintilă had not been a member of the Iron Guard but rather of the Swastika of Fire, and that the merger of LANC had supposedly "disillusioned" him.

Organizationally, the SDF's basic unit was the Pumn (English: Fist). A Fist was composed of nine members, organized primarily according to proximity, shared characteristics, location, and background. Several Fists together formed a Cerc (English: Circle), and multiple Circles formed a Grup (English: Group). A Commandment of the Brotherhoods of the Cross (youth units) was also formed alongside the feminine Fists, thus copying organizational models of the Iron Guard.

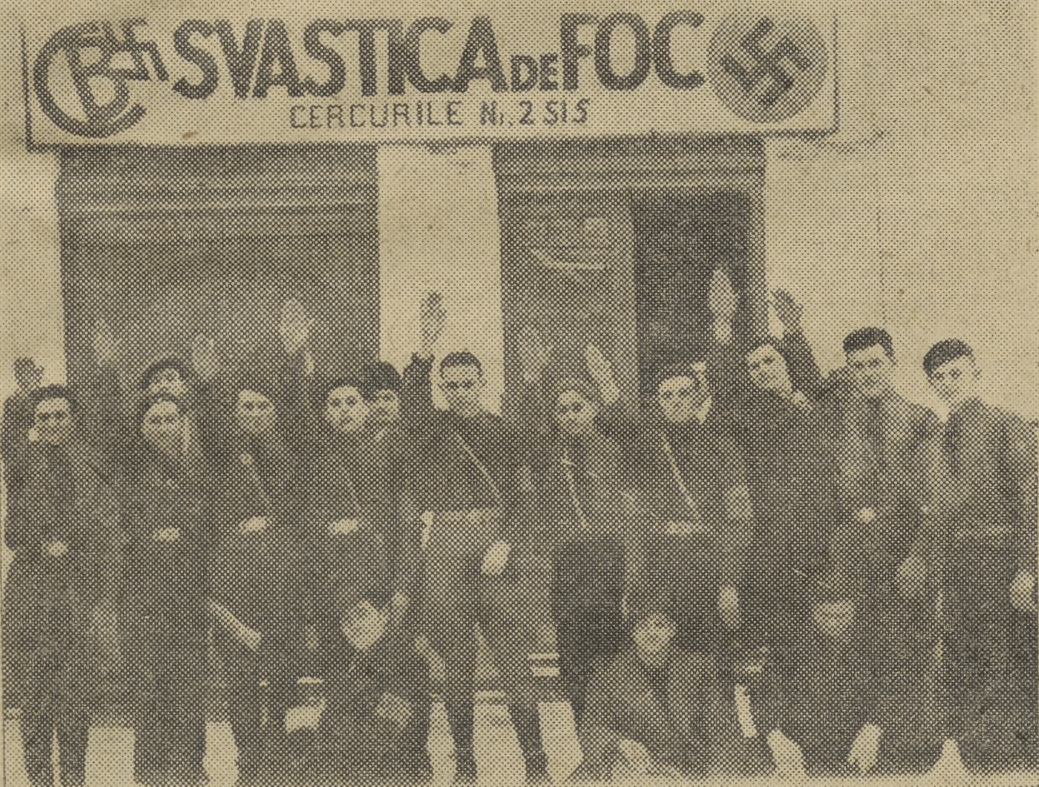
Members of the SDF from the 2nd and 5th Circles at the first SDF headquarters, located on Bulevardul Pache No. 144 in Bucharest. The constitutive act of the SDF was signed there on 14 November 1935.

Although it had not caused major disturbances for the authorities, there were some serious incidents; a suggestive example in this regard is when, on 6 October 1935, two trucks carrying circa 100 SDF brown shirts led by I. V. Emilian were stopped on the Bucharest-Giurgiu roadway by six gendarmes and asked to identify themselves. The brown shirts refused and subsequently disarmed the gendarmes. They then marched to the village of Călugăreni, where they thrashed the gendarmerie post and the town hall. Afterwards, they held speeches and agitated the population in the village center.

On another occasion, in April 1937, members of the SDF led by Emilian stormed a building where a meeting of the PNC was being held, presided over by Octavian Goga, shouting and provoking disorder among the attendees. The authorities intervened to restore order, and the report of the investigation following the conflict was forwarded to the Great Council of War to judge the case.

=== SDF in relation to the Iron Guard and the National Christian Party ===
I. V. Emilian had maintained cordial relations with Corneliu Zelea Codreanu ever since the latter left LANC in 1927 to form what would later be known as the Iron Guard. That same year, he participated in the swearing-in ceremony of the first legionaries (members of Codreanu's new movement), which he found more ridiculous than solemn. Despite the good relations between Emilian and Codreanu, the SDF would later declare itself in conflict with the Iron Guard, especially after Codreanu refused to collaborate with Emilian's organization. Another basis, alongside the good relations between the two, for a possible collaboration could have been the fact that both organizations positioned themselves against the PNC. The Iron Guard had a long-standing rivalry with both LANC and the PNC.

By the end of 1937, the SDF was attempting a reconciliation with the PNC (which, in December, had been appointed by Carol II to form the government). Emilian proposed reorganizing the SDF within the PNC as an elite assault and protection squad for its leaders, invoking the Schutzstaffel as a model. The merger never took place. In this position, the foreign Minister, Istrate Micescu, demanded Emilian to assassinate Corneliu Zelea Codreanu, but Emilian, hoping at a future reconciliation with the Iron Guard, refused.

== Gallery ==
Photos of the SDF
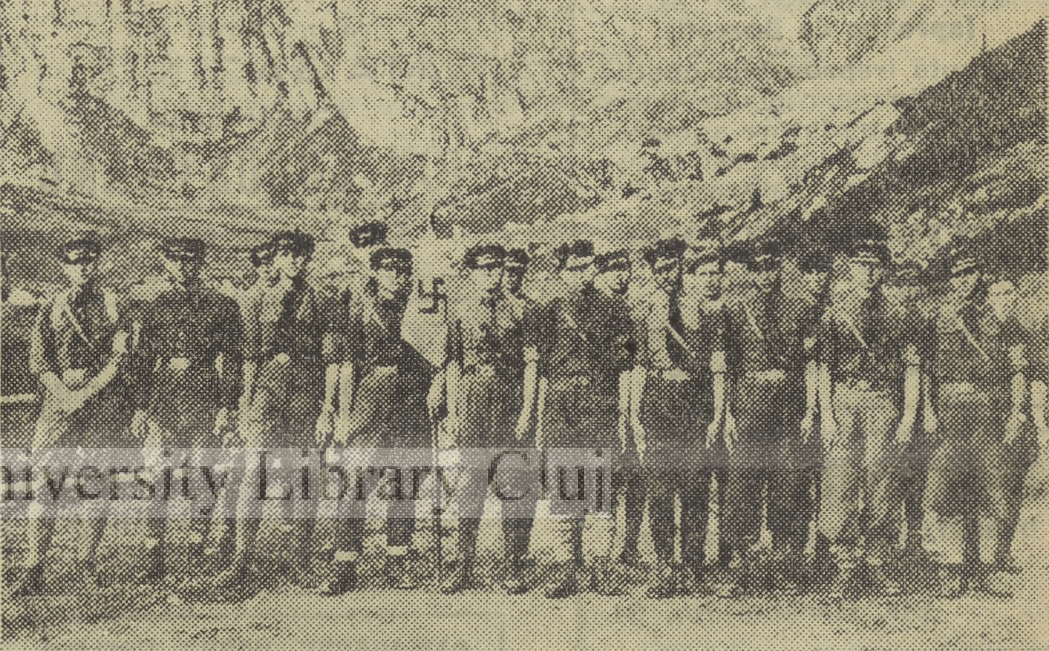
SDF members from Bucharest at Mălăești, under the Padina Crucii ridge. (1937)

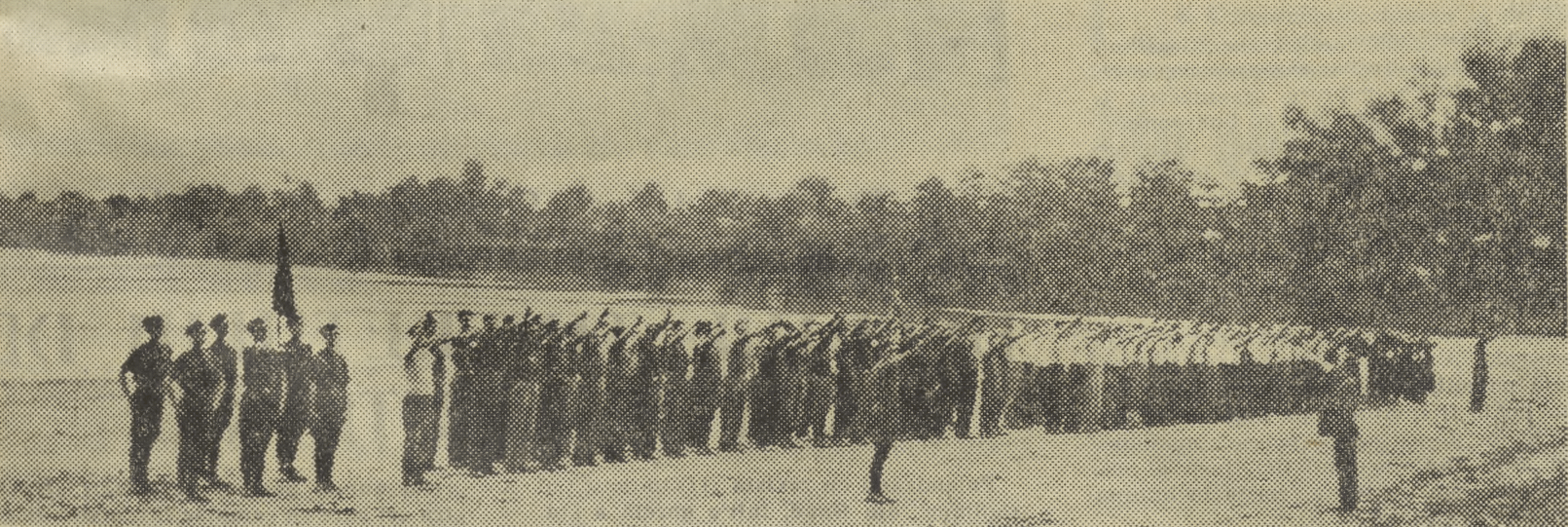
I. V. Emilian and members of the SDF, at Suseni on the bank of the Argeș. (1937)

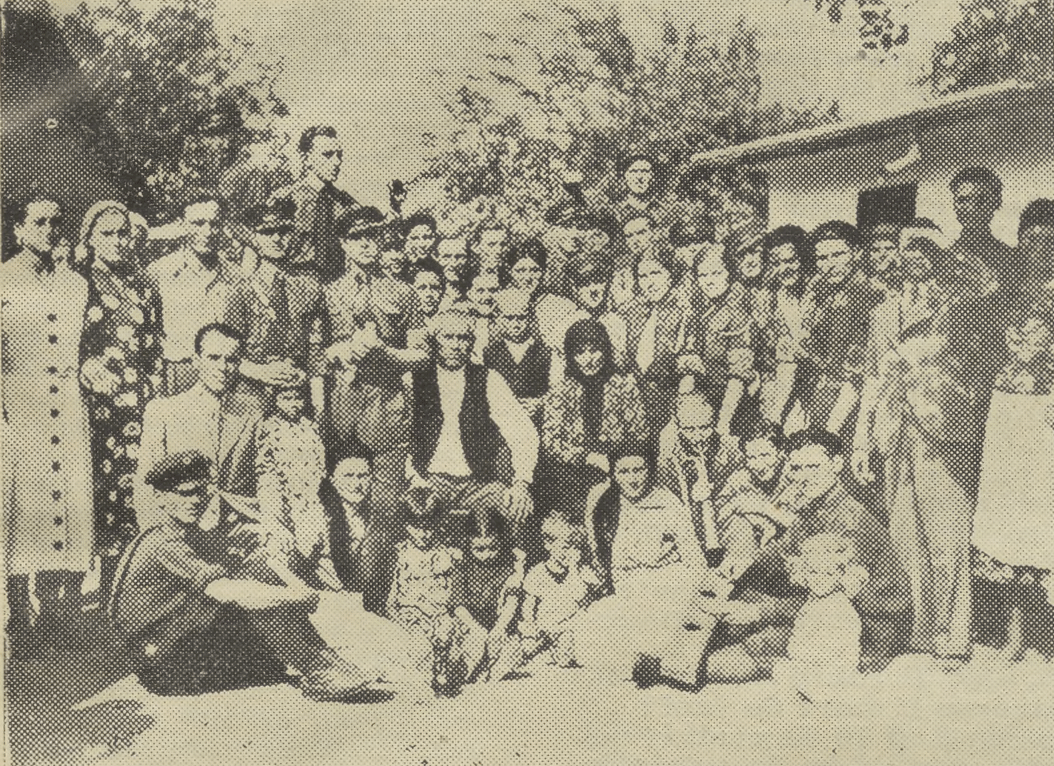
SDF members from Ialomița. (1937)

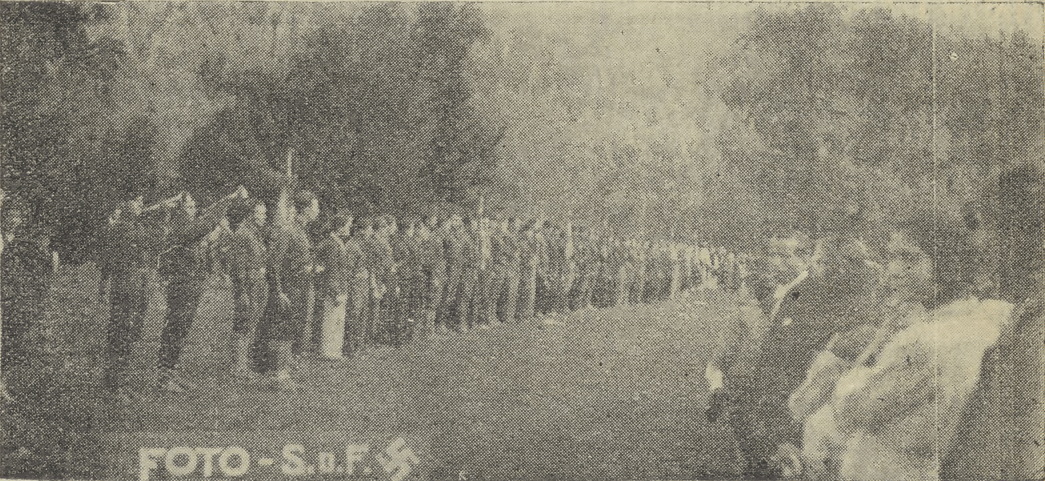
SDF members from Dâmbovița, at Poiana Cârligului. (1937)

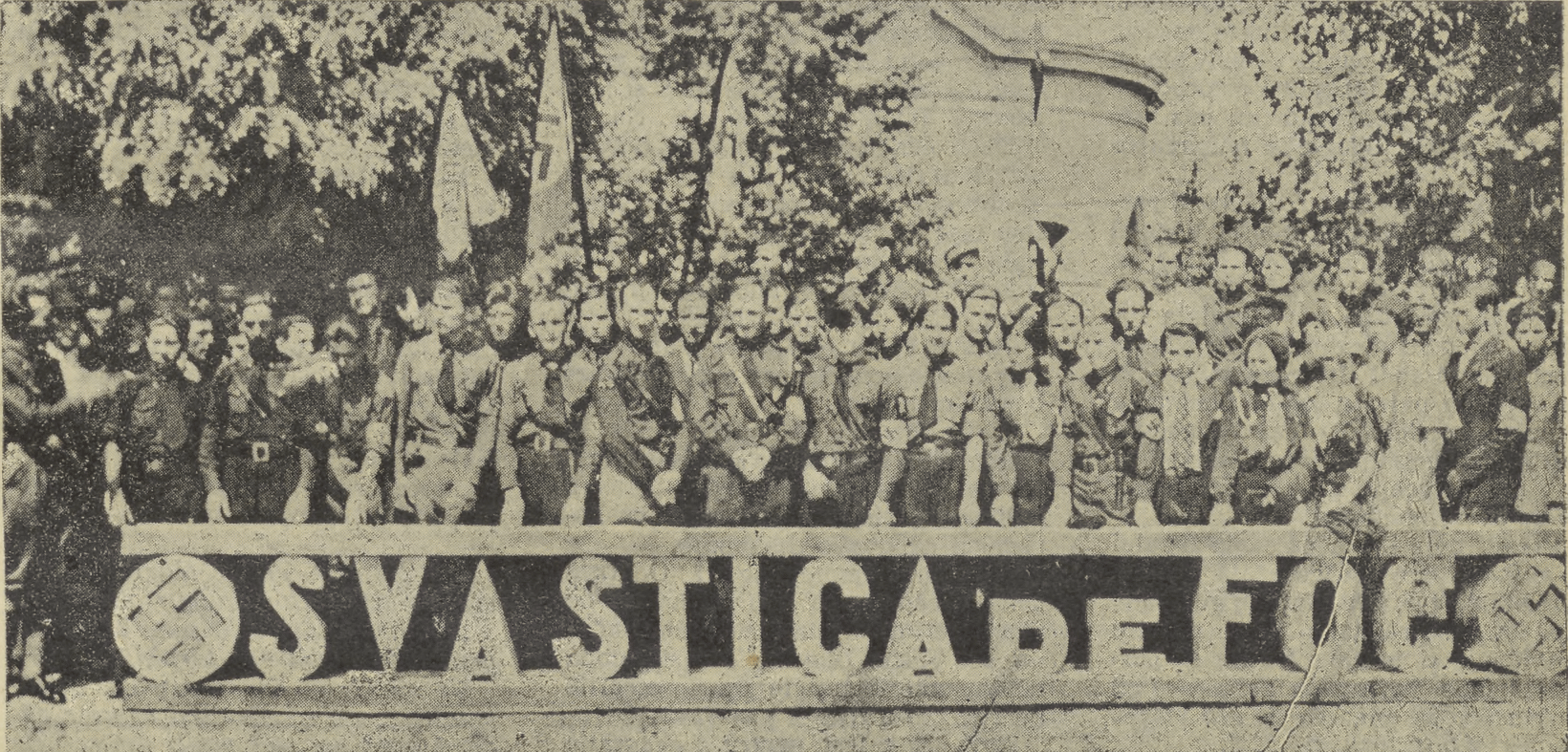
SDF local organization inauguration in Brăila. (1937)

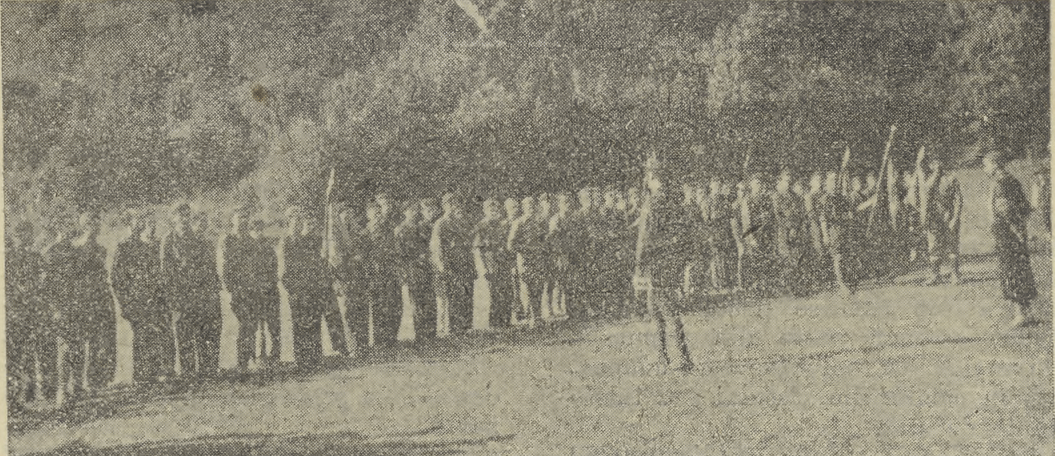
SDF Brown Shirts. (1937)

== Electoral history ==
=== Legislative elections ===
Election	Votes	Percentage	Assembly	Senate	Position
1937	83	0,003%	0 / 387	0 / 113	Other
