= National Agrarian Party =

National Agrarian Party Partidul Național-Agrar
- Abbreviation: PNA
- President: Octavian Goga
- Founded: April 10, 1932
- Dissolved: July 14, 1935
- Split from: People's Party
- Succeeded by: National Christian Party; National Agrarian Party (Valjean faction); Union of National Awareness (from 1938)
- Newspaper: Țara Noastră
- Ideology: Agrarianism; Romanian nationalism; National conservatism; Monarchism; Antisemitism; Corporatism; Fascism (disputed)
- Political position: Right-wing to far-right
- National affiliation: Antirevisionist League (1933)
- Slogan: Dumnezeu, Patrie, Rege ("God, Fatherland, King"); Rod mult, bun și cu preț ("More, better, valuable bearings")

The National Agrarian Party (Romanian: Partidul Național-Agrar or Partidul Național-Agrarian, PNA) was a right-wing agrarian party active in Romania during the early 1930s. Established and led by poet Octavian Goga, it was originally a schism from the more moderate People's Party, espousing agrarianism in combination with national conservatism, monarchism, antisemitism, and Germanophilia; Goga was also positively impressed by fascism, but there is disagreement in the scholarly community as to whether the PNA was itself fascist. Its antisemitic rhetoric was also contrasted by the PNA's acceptance of some Jewish members, including Tudor Vianu and Henric Streitman. The group was generally suspicious of Romania's other ethnic minorities, but in practice accepted members and external collaborators of many ethnic backgrounds, such as the Gagauz Dumitru Topciu and the Romani Gheorghe A. Lăzăreanu-Lăzurică.

The PNA existed as a venue for supporting the authoritarian King, Carol II, whose political program it partly enacted. The National Agrarianist economic and social proposals included the protection of smallholders, with echoes of dirigisme and promises of debt relief. It was strongly opposed to the more left-wing National Peasants' Party, describing it as corrupt and denouncing its autonomist-regionalist tendencies. In Parliament, PNA representatives, largely inherited from the People's Party, collaborated mostly with two other anti-establishment groups: the Georgist Liberals and the Lupist Peasantists. The PNA was able to absorb some National Peasantist sections, primarily in Bucharest and Transylvania.

The PNA registered its best result nationally in the December 1933 election, when it took 4.1% of the vote. Despite its relative insignificance, its leader Goga was often perceived as a likely contender for the office of Prime Minister. The PNA had contacts in Nazi Germany, who regarded it as a political ally. While cautious about the Nazis' take on international politics, Goga traveled to Berlin in late 1933, meeting Adolf Hitler and returning as an enthusiastic admirer. Moving closer to the far-right and abandoning his own membership in the Romanian Freemasonry, Goga sought alliances with the more radical movements. The PNA tried but failed to unite with the Iron Guard and the Romanian Front, finally merging with the slightly more powerful National-Christian Defense League in July 1935.

The resulting National Christian Party (PNC) offered a venue for conservative antisemites with fascist sympathies, but was rejected by PNA moderates, as well as by some of the League's radicals. A splinter group, led by Ion Al. Vasilescu-Valjean and centered on Romanați County, continued to call itself PNA, surviving to December 1937. Briefly serving as Prime Minister, Goga was asked to step down by Carol II, whose 1938 Constitution introduced a royal dictatorship. Goga died soon after; although the PNC was not repressed under the new regime, it suffered an internal crisis, with PNA men establishing a Union of National Awareness. Both it and other PNC factions were then absorbed by Carol's National Renaissance Front.

== History ==
=== Emergence ===
The party emerged with a split in the more mainstream People's Party (PP), which was led by General Alexandru Averescu. This followed a major dispute between Averescu and Goga, prompted by the latter's unconditional support for Carol II, who had taken the throne under disputed circumstances in 1930. Historian Adolf Minuț argues that Carol personally intervened to create a rift between the two men, this being one of a "web of Carlist machinations" to isolate his constitutionalist adversaries. The same is noted by memoirist Vasile Netea, who describes Carol as performing "scissiparity" on the old parties. In January 1932, Goga had vaguely announced his bid for the PP chairmanship, while also hinting that he was prepared to leave with his partisans if his candidacy were to be rejected. On March 3, Averescu formally denounced Goga's maneuvers in a circular letter to regional affiliates, noting that a conspiracy was in place to break up the PP.

In response, Goga accused Averescu of tarnishing the crown's prestige, claiming that his own faction was now Romania's "one monarchist party"; according to Goga, a reigning king was to be held as an expression of the "Romanian soul". Goga and his group were now situated on the extreme of Romanian nationalism, with "some sympathies toward fascism". However, their caucus was also able to absorb more moderate sections of the PP, leaving Averescu's group severely weakened. Averescu and his colleague, Grigore Trancu-Iași, fought back by asking for all dissidents still holding seats in the Assembly of Deputies to be deposed. This proposal was eventually defeated by a vote, during which the National Liberal Party voted in Goga's favor.

Goga's party originated with a PP congress at Enescu restaurant on March 12, attended by 45 of 65 sections, which proclaimed Goga as People's Party chairman. By March 21, Averescu was able to regain control over most PP chapters, though he lost all presence in places such as Argeș, Cluj, and Mehedinți. Goga also enjoyed strong support in places such as Caraș County, where a local activist and landowner, Romulus Boldea, also embraced the schism. Following this confrontation, Goga announced he would take on the "painful task" of leaving Averescu's group. As noted by scholar Armin Heinen, the National Agrarians' genesis coincided with the parallel rise of the Nazi Party in Weimar Germany: the PNA began organizing during Weimar's presidential election, in which Adolf Hitler came second.

Goga's "general staff" included former minister Ion Petrovici, alongside Ion Al. Vasilescu-Valjean and C. Brăescu, who had been Vice Presidents of the Deputies' Assembly. According to Valjean's own recollections, he was recruited by the PNA together with the "independent liberal group", which he had established as a parliamentary party. Three other prominent Averescu supporters, Leon Scridon, Silviu Dragomir and Ioan Lupaș, also joined Goga during his departure. Early defectors also included a large part of the PP eminences in Transylvania and the Banat: Sebastian Bornemisa, Eugen P. Barbul, Laurian Gabor, and Petru Nemoianu. This remained "the most painful" of all schisms endured by the PP. On April 10, 1932, this dissidence held its congress at Rio Cinema, Bucharest. Its first presidium included Lupaș, General Constantin Iancovescu, Stan Ghițescu, Ilie Rădulescu, and Iancu Isvoranu; Goga was reconfirmed as People's Party chairman, before the party changed names. The "PNA" name was adopted hours later, following a motion submitted by deputy D. D. Burileanu—having been first submitted for discussion a week earlier, during a more private meeting of party leaders. The group registered as its electoral symbol "two dots within a circumference", sometimes described as a circle with "two eyes". Whether intentionally or not, this symbol closely resembled the circle used by a more democratic agrarian group, the National Peasants' Party (PNȚ). Transylvanian defectors from the PNȚ initially organized some of the PNA branches, but, in June 1932, returned to their old party. More dedicated support came from the former PNȚ chapters in Ilfov County and the "Black" (northeastern) sector of Bucharest, which were absorbed into Goga's new movement.

Țara Noastră, put out from Transylvania by Ion Gorun, endured as the central party organ, with another party newspaper of the same name appearing at Buzău. While establishing itself regionally, Goga's party took over or established several regional newspapers: Cuvântul Poporului, put out by Elie Mărgeanu of Sibiu; Agrarul Vâlcei, published by Dumitru Zeana in Râmnicu Vâlcea; Cârma Vremii of Iași and Chemarea of Vaslui; as well as two sheets in Brăila and Constanța, both named Brazda Nouă. PNA cadres included four important figures in Romania's commercial and industrial life, who, as Netea writes, were especially treasured by Goga. These were Ghițescu, Tilică Ioanid, I. D. Enescu, and Leon Gigurtu. The group also reached out of its PP constituency, and had traction among people not previously involved in party politics, such as Virgil Molin, a journalist and president of the Craiova chamber of labor. Also joining the PNA were the literary critic Tudor Vianu and his brother, the essayist Alexandru Vianu, alongside poet Sandu Tudor and philosopher Alexandru Mironescu. A small PNA chapter existed at Iași; it was very joined by another writer, Păstorel Teodoreanu, who had publicized disagreements with the local chairman, Florin Sion, and quit the party shortly after. The party's Câmpulung Moldovenesc branch was headed by lawyer Traian Popovici.

PNA figures
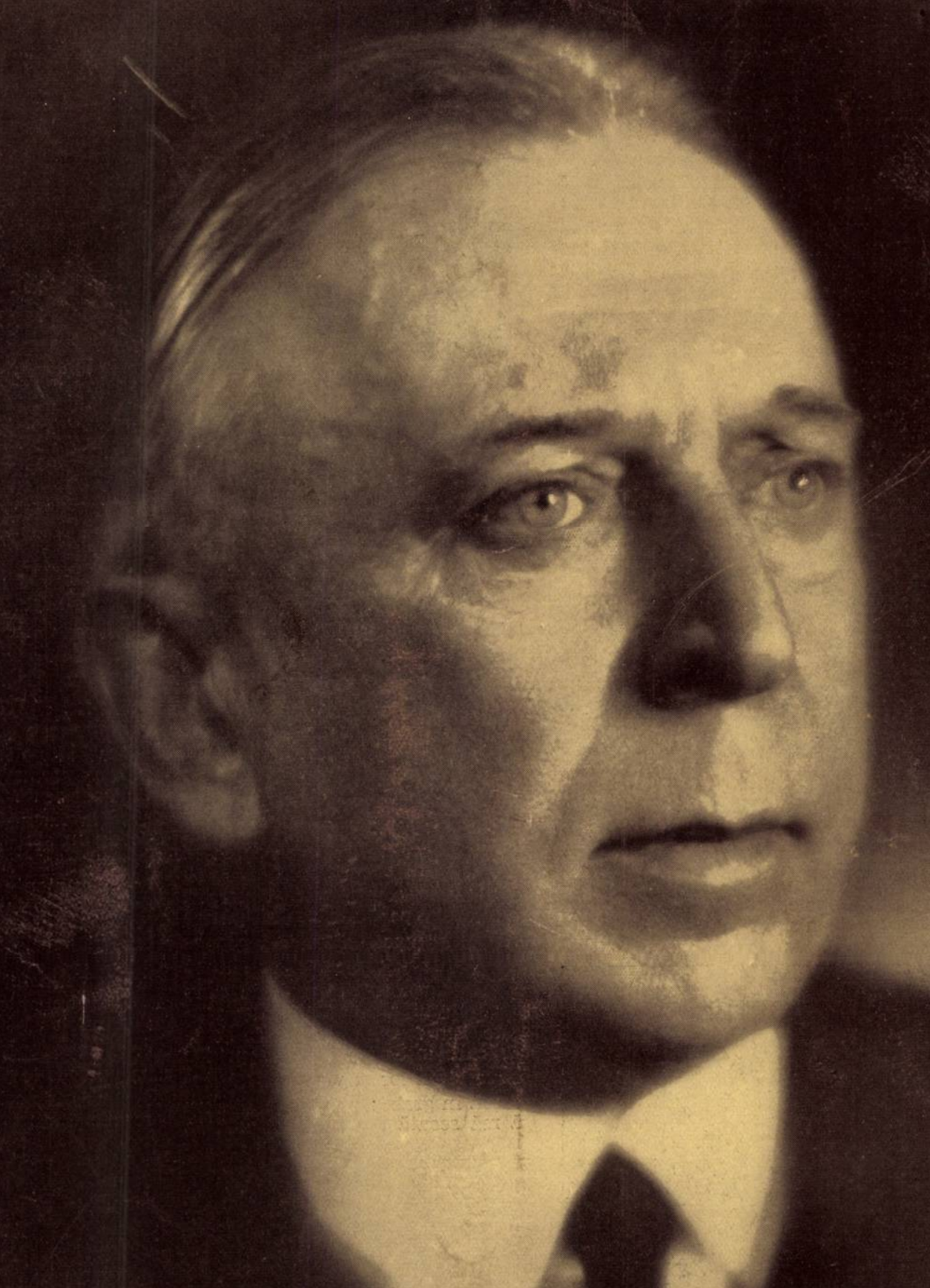
Octavian Goga in 1938

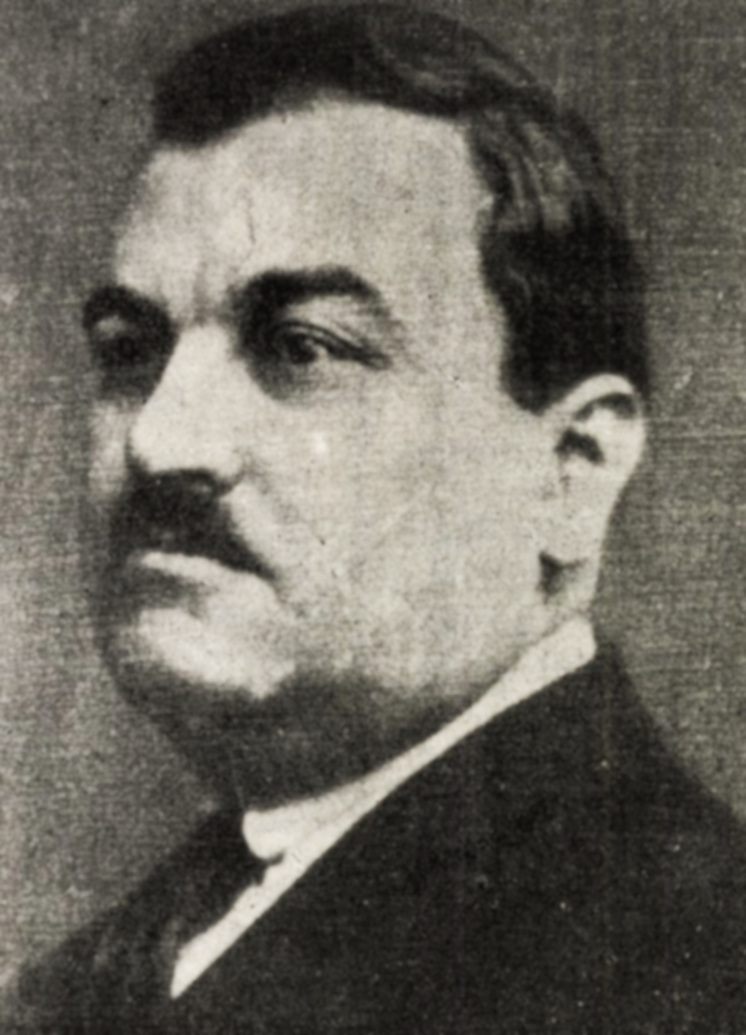
Sergiu Niță in 1926

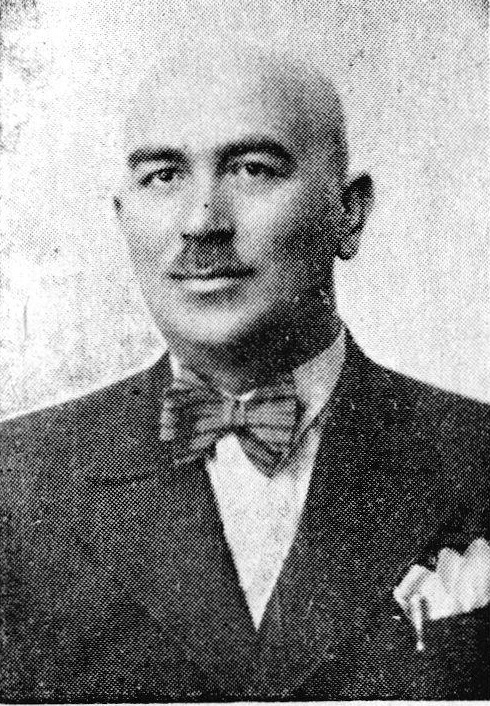
Traian Popovici in 1934

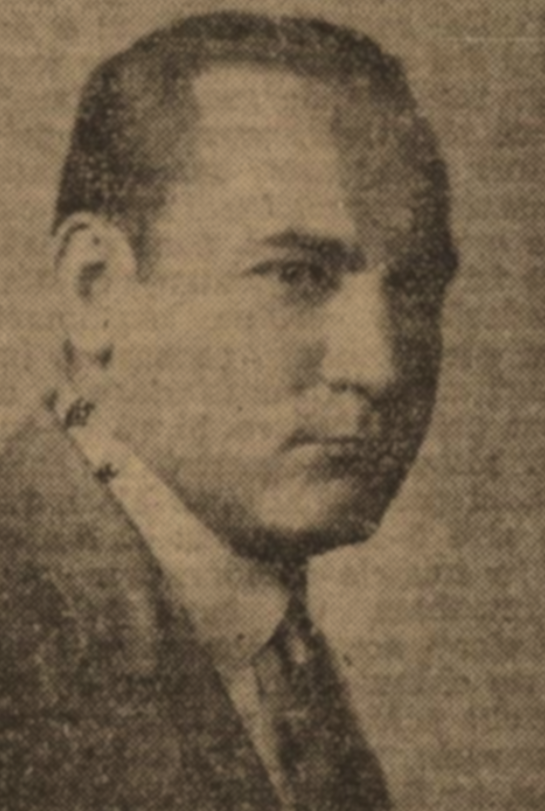
Leon Scridon c. 1930

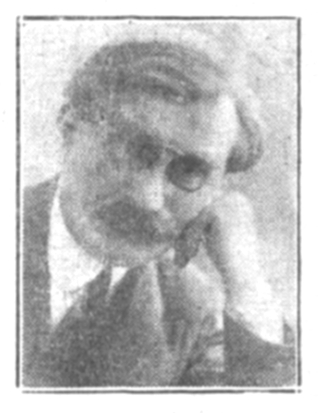
Henric Streitman in 1938

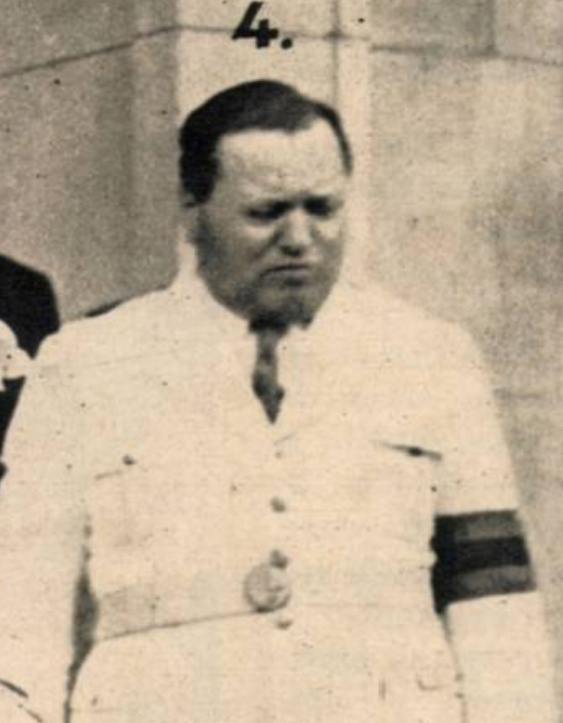
Dumitru Topciu in 1940

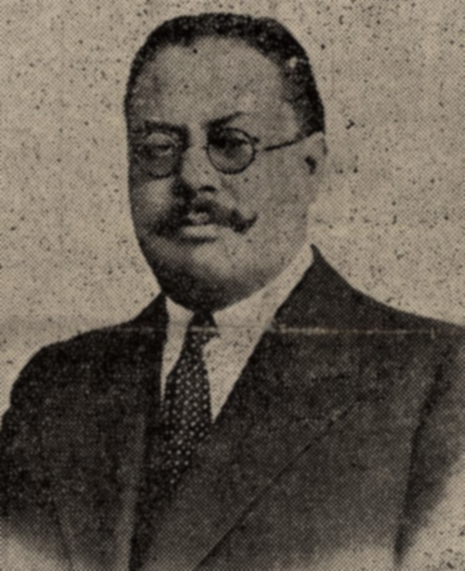
Ion Al. Vasilescu-Valjean in 1935

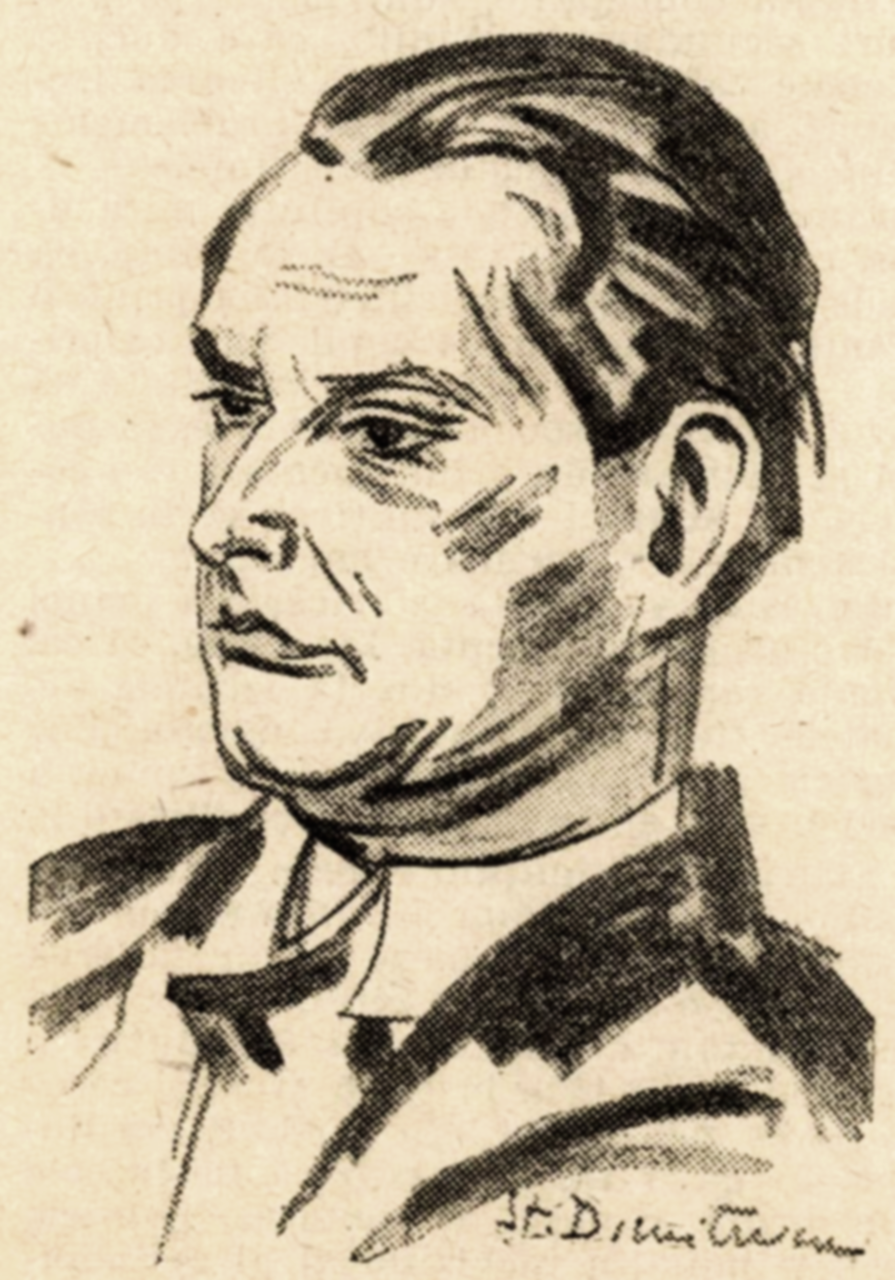
Tudor Vianu in 1926

=== Platform ===
==== Conservatism, radicalism, agrarianism ====
As Heinen notes, the PNA was one of several groups channeling popular discontent following the Great Depression; it was also the most authentic, and a "remarkable force." Historian Stanley G. Payne describes the splinter group as authoritarian nationalist and "rightist", or "rather more overtly right radical" than Mihail Manoilescu's own dissident faction. The issue of its labeling has caused some disputes in the community of experts. Nicholas Nagy-Talavera viewed Goga as a "bourgeois fascist", but his assessment was challenged by Heinen, according to whom the PNA's "radical nationalism" was "entirely devoid of that revolutionary pathos which set apart all the fascist parties." Overall, "too many PNA members were still tied to the People's Party directives in both manners and ideas of political combat." Researcher Ion Mezarescu likewise viewed the PNA ideology as "within the coordinates of interwar bourgeois democracy". However, according to scholar Irina Livezeanu, Goga was in the process of migrating "across the conservative-radical divide". National Peasantist Nicolae Carandino, who was a political reporter in the 1930s, describes his disappointment with witnessing Goga's transition into a "politician and by no means a statesman". According to Carandino, the PNA leader had "no politically autonomous values", and was essentially a "high-end prostitute".

While reaching out to the far-right, the PNA remained staunchly monarchist—according to Heinen, Goga was a "national conservative" among the "Carlists". The National Agrarians adopted Dumnezeu, Patrie, Rege ("God, Fatherland, King") as their slogan, a rallying cry already associated with Goga before the party's formation. The group's rejection of democracy had its roots in Goga's 1927 book, Mustul care fierbe ("The Frothing Must"), which argued that the masses needed a "moral eminence" to "inspire in them tranquility and safety." The PNA suggested modifying Romania's Constitution of 1923, reducing Parliament to an "orderly and useful instrument", reformed around a corporative representation. Simultaneously, the party campaigned for widening the suffrage, primarily by allowing women to vote; to this end, the wives of PNA eminences created their own "women circles", which also took up the task of promoting social hygiene in rural areas.

In time, the PNA adopted another slogan: Rod mult, bun și cu preț ("More, better, valuable bearings"). This notion reflected its commitment to an agrarian economy, which Goga identified as the core of Romania's potential for export, in tandem with the Romanianization of labor and capital. Its leadership promised to suspend payments on Romania's external debt; in exchange, it promised a tax reform that would benefit both local and foreign investors. Goga's agrarianism was identified as the main point of attraction by recruits such as Dumitru Topciu; it rested on the notion that peasants were a unifying factor, their shared culture transcending regional divisions. In 1935, Valjean similarly proclaimed that all classes were "subordinate to the plowmen". His PNA intended to make the smallholders key players in Romania's economy, encouraging credit unions and land purchase, as well as describing a future in which labor and its product would be more expensive; it also promised to enact agricultural dirigisme, with tools such as a state plan for developing agriculture, pomology, sericulture, and handicrafts.

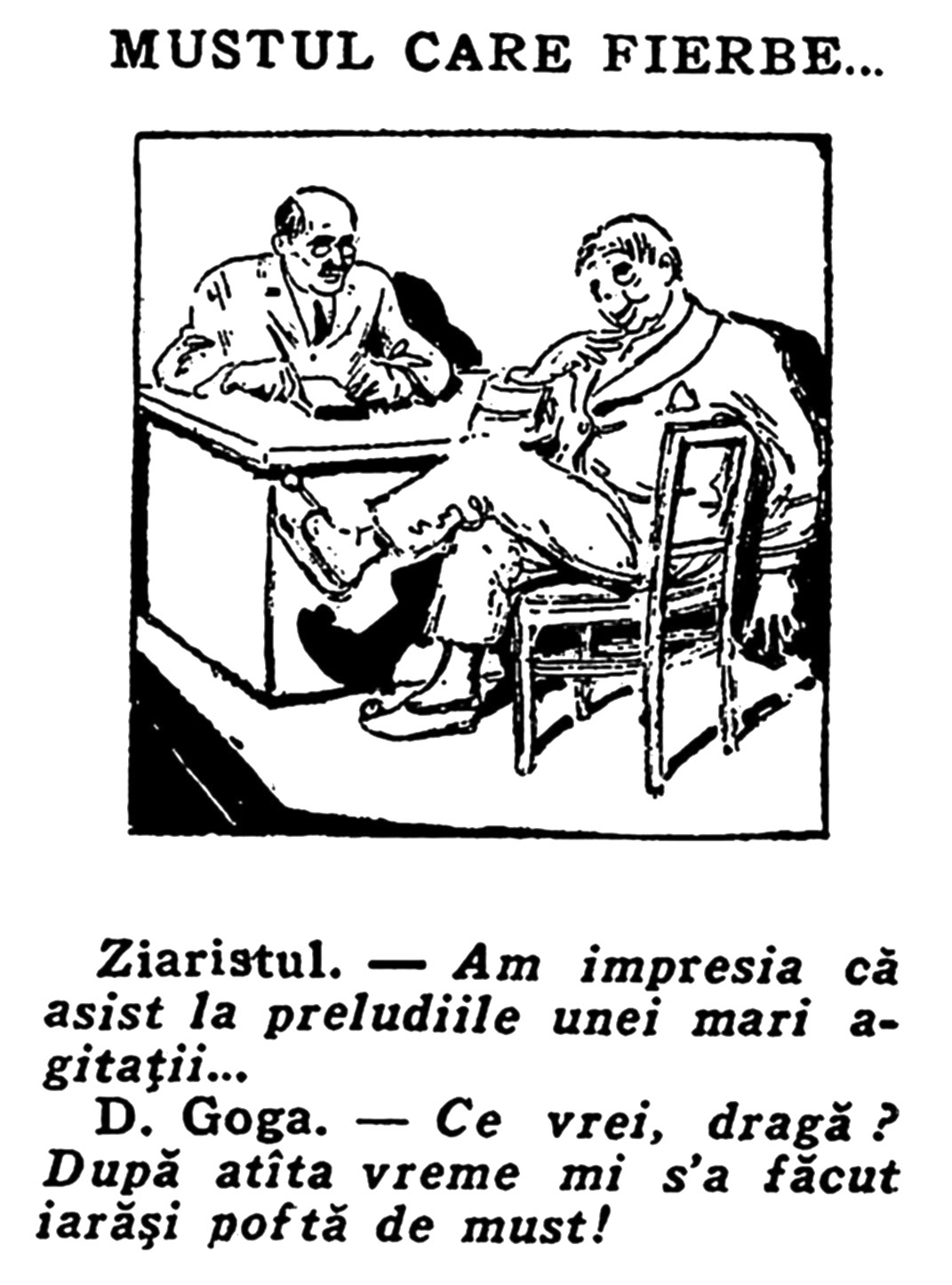
Goga acknowledging his thirst for "frothing must", as the prelude to a "great agitation", in an imaginary interview. Cartoon published by the left-wing review Viața Românească in 1933

In parallel, Goga's intellectual debt to corporatism took form as promises to enact class collaboration, or "harmonious solidarity between workers, peasants and all other productive forces". Historian Oltea Rășcanu Gramaticu, who focused on the politics of Tutova County, noted that the PNA enjoyed "some popularity", due to its "radical solutions for revitalizing small plots owned by the peasants". However, as argued by researchers Cornel Popescu and George Daniel Ungureanu, the PNA was agrarian "in name", and had a mostly right-wing program. While seeking ways to improve the peasants' economic status, the party pledged itself to administrative reform and a full clampdown on corruption. By October 1932, its deputies were engaged in a public confrontation with the PNȚ cabinet, headed by Alexandru Vaida-Voevod, over the issue of debt relief. Goga wanted most of the small- and mid-sized plots to be cleared of debt with state support, and wanted to extend that principle to public debt held by urban localities. He also wanted communes to exercise more control over local tribunals. Such proposals were balanced out by the PNA's adversity toward decentralizing projects, in which Goga saw evidence of pushes for Transylvanian autonomism, as endorsed by the PNȚ. The PNA understood administrative reform to be necessary, but would only commit itself to projects which would befit "national unity as an instinct".

==== The PNA on minorities ====
The party's stances evidenced Goga's conversion to antisemitism, which he had not explicitly embraced before 1932; within that framework, Goga was arguing that Jews were endorsing "Magyarization" in Transylvania. However, already in the 1910s Goga was modelling himself on Karl Lueger, Cisleithania's antisemitic doctrinaire; Lueger's influence also reached directly to other PNA affiliates, including Boldea. In the 1920s, Goga's Țara Noastră had expressed sympathy with the growing antisemitic trend among students, and indirectly with the Iron Guard. In Mustul care fierbe, Goga further hinted that Jews were to blame for the ills of modernity. He voiced alarm about Greater Romania being invaded by "parasites" and "guess... who". However, he framed his support for the students in terms of social rejuvenation, and noted that violent antisemitism was perhaps an "incorrect slogan". During the elections of 1926, Goga, as Minister of the Interior, had obtained favors for A. C. Cuza's National-Christian Defense League (LANC), which was virulently antisemitic. However, his assistance proved a moderating influence, obliging Cuza to purge the LANC of radicals such as Ion Zelea Codreanu, Valer Pop, and Traian Brăileanu.

While commenting on Goga's political duplicity, Carandino argued that he "was just as ready to serve the monarchy, the [National] Liberals, [the Jewish businessman] Aristide Blank, or anyone else who would have hired him." In 1931, Goga was still reassuring his readers that he was not an antisemite. According to Minuț, his subsequent drift was a consequence of his taking money from antisemitic industrialists, and in particular from Ion Gigurtu. Xenophobic radicalization was additionally enhanced by the PNA–PNȚ conflict: Goga castigated his adversaries for their alleged grafting during the "Škoda Affair", which had profited the Polish industrialist Bruno Seletzky. However, Minuț notes, Goga was "contradictory" even at this late stage, sometimes stating his belief in the minorities' integration, but often decrying their participation in public life.

The PNA nevertheless had various Jewish affiliates, including the Vianus, who probably believed that membership would complement their assimilation, and journalist Henric Streitman, who was primarily motivated by anticommunism. While Tudor Vianu co-chaired the PNA Studies Circle, alongside Petrovici, Streitman was appointed on the PNA's Executive Committee. They were joined by Jewish philosopher Iosif Brucăr, but only briefly. As Brucăr explained years later, he had resigned upon learning what the party actually stood for. Another leading party figure was Jewish businessman Leon Preiss, who chaired the PNA section in Bucharest's Black Sector and, in 1932, still referred to Goga as a friend of the Jews. Boldea, who now chaired the PNA section in Caraș, was married to a Bosnian Catholic woman of German, Italian, and possibly Jewish ancestry.

The party remained open to other ethnic minorities: its branch in Durostor County, organized by M. Magiari and Pericle Papahagi, counted Turks, Bulgarians and Aromanians among its members; as noted by scholar Ivan Duminică, Topciu, who was an ethnic Gagauz from Tomai in the Budjak, "managed to attract many of his brethren to the party." PNA sections in Bukovina were led by Petro Ivanciuc, Andriv Zemliuc and Necolai Palli, who were probably Ukrainian. Goga also had contacts within the Romani community, including activist Gheorghe A. Lăzăreanu-Lăzurică, who acted as an electoral agent for both the PNA and the Iron Guard. PNA politico Rădulescu was allegedly of Romani origin, and was attending Romani congresses in a private capacity. Such issues highlighted the schism between the two Romani organizations, respectively led by Lăzăreanu and Calinic Șerboianu. At the time, Șerboianu accused his rival of being Goga's puppet.

=== Electioneering and Nazi influence ===
According to Heinen, the PNA can be grouped into an "antisemitic [and] markedly right-wing" segment, alongside the LANC and the Citizen Bloc—but distinct from the more radical Iron Guard. The three parties had 9% of the vote in the July 1932 election, with the PNA itself at 3.64% (or 4% and 108,857 ballots, in Minuț's count). The leading candidates included Dragomir, Ghițescu, Gorun, Ioanid, Lupaș, Nemoianu, Scridon, Topciu, Valjean, Sergiu Niță, I. C. Atanasiu, as well as the party leader and his brother Eugen Goga. Eight were elected, including Octavian Goga for Mureș, Ioanid for Mehedinți, Ghițescu for Teleorman, Pavel Guciujna for Orhei, and Valjean for Romanați; Scridon also entered the Assembly by taking the second seat in Năsăud County, with 2,069 votes. With less success, the PNA also fielded other recruits—including Sion at Iași, Teodor Cudalbu in Tutova, and Theodor Rășcanu in Vaslui. The latter defected to the Iron Guard before election-day.

According to Netea's first-hand account, O. Goga's victory was hard-won: peasants rounded up to mock him during his campaign tour at Deda. Speaking for his party, Ghițescu accused Premier Vaida of having falsified the vote. The PNA chose not to compete in the by-elections of September, announcing that it was too caught up organizing its base. Vaida's paper, Gazeta Transilvaniei, ridiculed this decision, noting that Goga had been "shamed" and was not risking further embarrassment. The National Agrianists had by then cultivated a relationship with two other splinter groups of the classical parties: the Georgist Liberal Party and the Lupist Peasantists. It developed into a working alliance, though Valjean went public with his criticism of the Georgists' republican tendencies. Preparing for a foreseeable PNȚ downfall, the PNA held large-scale rallies announcing its preparedness for government. In April, at Caracal, Goga hinted that Carol was seriously considering forming a PNA cabinet. On June 26, addressing a crowd gathered outside Târgoviște, he announced his contempt for the PNȚ, describing its leader, Iuliu Maniu, as "responsible for all misfortunes that have fallen upon this country." In December 1933, Carol asked Vaida to step down, and the National Liberals took over, with Ion G. Duca at the helm. Duca then approached the PNA leadership to establish a coalition, conditioned on Goga toning down his nationalism; Goga refused. The PNA leader was also dissatisfied with the details of the offer, and in particular with Duca's history as an anti-Carlist. Discarding such mainstream arrangements, the PNA issued press releases referring to the Duca team as a clientele of the Jewry.

Before the December 1933 election in Romania, Germany had come under Nazi control. The PNA found itself intensely courted by the new regime, which pursued Eastern European alliances. Goga was a regular guest at the German Legation, and accepted offers for collaboration; however, he also insisted that Nazi Germany vouch for Greater Romania's borders. During those months, the PNA, represented by Valjean, joined the "Antirevisionist League", a civic movement for the Little Entente and against Hungarian irredentism. Formally supportive of the League of Nations and its system of peace treaties, the PNA made a slow move into Germany's orbit. In its electoral program of 1933, the party removed all reference to the toleration of national minorities, and proposed measures to supervise them, and in particular their "ideological imports". Nonetheless, in March 1933, the Nazi agent of influence, Friedrich Weber, described Goga as a "man of the future", one who could bring Hitler's ideology to Romania.

A far-right politico, Nae Ionescu, allegedly regarded Goga as a potential Prime Minister of an Iron Guard cabinet. According to this version, Goga was tasked with enacting the "Hitlerian" program, including antisemitism and anti-Masonry. This pronouncement anticipated Goga's own departure from the Romanian Freemasonry, of which he was still a member in summer 1933. In September, Goga and Colonel Ștefan Tătărescu of the Romanian National Socialist Party (PNSR) were both received by Hitler in Berlin. In November, while campaigning in Bessarabia, the Colonel was seized by the local police. Consequently, he and Cicerone Manole, who had led the Bukovina Nazi cell, were put up as PNA candidates for the Assembly—Tătărescu headed the list for Cahul, while Manole ran second to Teodor Tcaciuc in Storojineț.

The 1932 performance was closely mirrored in this second national race, when the PNA managed 4.2%, with its family of parties again at 9%. Such results proved well below Goga's expectations, and widely acknowledged as a sign that the Romanian electorate had not been persuaded by the tenets of radical nationalism—the party leader himself noted that propaganda had been "inefficient". The PNA had nine mandates: Goga, Scridon, Ioanid and Ghițescu held on to their seats; Valjean was also elected, but for Caraș, with Petrovici taking his post in Romanați. Topciu also won a seat, at Tighina, while physician Gheorghe Banu was elected at Ialomița. Another new recruit, Vasile Goldiș, failed to win the race for Arad, as did Ion Demetrescu-Agraru in Baia, while Lupaș lost at Sibiu and Nemoianu at Severin. Overall, the PNA had some 122,000 votes, which was enough to earn it an extra seat.

=== Merger and splinters ===
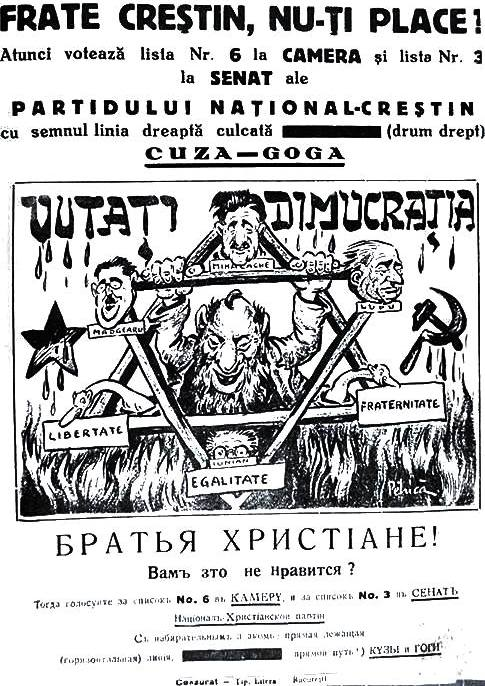
PNC poster for the general election of 1937, addressing both Romanian and Bessarabian Russian constituents. Image shows a stereotypical Jewish man maneuvering democratic politics, depicted as a Star of David festooned with heads of political party leaders; these include Goga's former allies Nicolae L. Lupu (of the Lupist Peasantists) and Grigore Iunian (of the Radical Peasants' Party)

As historian Francisco Veiga notes, visits to Germany and Fascist Italy made Goga "enthusiastic" and "completed [his] political evolution". Goga himself claimed that he had made Benito Mussolini be less supportive of Hungarian irredentism, by reminding him of the "blood kinship" between Romanians and Italians. It was also at this stage that Goga began openly praising Italian fascism as the paragon of the "new psychology", while using its administrative laws as a template for reforms in Romania. According to Mezarescu, this period also saw him taking a stand against Marxism, which he opposed to "Romanianism". According to Mezarescu, this had "no logical justification", given that Goga addressed his critique to a "healthy [and] modern" capitalist society, in which Marxist postulates were "virtually unknown".

The PNA and the LANC both repeatedly tried, but failed, to persuade the Iron Guard into a merger. King Carol also proposed that the Guard be co-opted into a government coalition of "national forces", centered on the PP and the PNA. This tendency was curbed by Premier Duca, who outlawed the Guard. Goga and the PNA reacted with public protests, viewing the measure as unwarranted. In part, this was because the PNA leadership sensed that Duca would next target them. Reportedly, after Duca's assassination by Guardist Nicadori, Goga sent boots as gifts to all those convicted for the murder. PNA deputies publicly called for an end to the anti-Guard wave of arrests, suggesting that it was unjustified. An overview in the Italian fascist Corriere Emiliano congratulated Goga, alongside Grigore Iunian of the Radical Peasants' Party, for having determined that the Duca assassination was a pretext, used by the Freemasonry and the Alliance Israélite Universelle "for destroying Romanian nationalism." By 1934, Goga was exchanging letters with the Guard's leader, Corneliu Zelea Codreanu, who promised him backing for a PNA government.

Nevertheless, according to writer Al. Gherghel, in August 1933 the PNA still viewed itself as standing against "right- and left-wing extremes", its platform one of "moderate progress". Over the following months, Goga tried to fuse into his party the Lupists and Radical Peasantists, as well as the Agrarian League. During August 1934, Italy offered to defend the Federal State of Austria against Nazi encroachment. Țara Noastră took Mussolini's side, defining him as a providential man, and "the most ardent defender of peace." In mid-1935, Goga also approached Vaida's new far-right party, called Romanian Front (FR), with offers of alliance or merger. Reportedly, Goga offered to fuse the PNA group into the FR, asking that he be assigned vice-chairmanship; Vaida refused, since he had promised that role to a long-time collaborator of his, Aurel Vlad.

Goga's Nazi contacts also networked for the creation of a Romanian fascist party bringing together the PNA, the LANC, and the Georgists, but the project failed to materialize in this form. It was then kept alive by Alfred Rosenberg, who believed in the necessity of consolidating Romania's antisemitic camp. A LANC–PNA fusion was nonetheless also favored by Carol, who kept a close watch on Goga through Ion Sân-Giorgiu; both the king and his spy saw the resulting party as an instrument for the king's own executive powers. Carol's agent at Internal Affairs, Victor Iamandi, distributed boons to the PNA and the LANC, helping their leaders to prefer Carol over Codreanu. Nichifor Crainic, who oversaw the LANC's paramilitary youth (or Lăncieri), also boasted an important role in negotiating the Goga–Cuza rapprochement. The final merger was also partly motivated by Cuza's political calculations, since the LANC had only taken 4.5% of the vote in 1933.

Claiming to represent "100,000 partisans" throughout Greater Romania, the National Agrarianists held their second and final congress on April 7, 1935, again at Rio Cinema. On July 14, the PNA merged with the LANC to form the National Christian Party, a hard-line antisemitic group. It used as its most popular symbol the LANC swastika, which Goga himself acknowledged as standing for the "Aryan race"; according to Mezarescu, its adoption showed a direct link with Nazism, despite claims that it had evolved from old Dacian symbolism. The new party had a shared presidency, with Cuza and Goga as co-chairs. It sought to challenge the Iron Guard whilst remaining close to more mainstream conservative forces.

=== Later echoes ===
As noted by historian Lucian T. Butaru, Goga proved a worthy replacement for Cuza's first associate, Nicolae Paulescu, who had died after disease in 1931. Nevertheless, the new party faced immediate difficulties. A far-left antifascist, Scarlat Callimachi, noted in September 1935 that the PNC was made up from regional chapters that had no common ideological ground, the entire enterprise having been engineered by Hitler. The fusion resulted in another split: after being sidelined in favor of a Goga favorite, I. V. Emilian quit the PNC and formed his own movement, called "Fire Swastika". Valjean also opposed the merger, and made a point of not attending the PNC's constitutive congress. In an interview with Curentul, he deplored the merger as a Cuzist takeover. As he noted there, his own agrarianism was a venue for "practical reforms"; he also challenged Goga's external policies, arguing that Romania's economic dependency on Germany could not dilute her commitments to France and Britain. Such sentiments were also prevalent among other figures of the party elite. As noted by his philosopher grandson, Virgil Nemoianu, though Boldea agreed to join the PNC, his "inclination toward Germany clashed with his antipathy toward [Hitler's] vulgarity and cruelty."

Valjean's own National Agrarian Party, centered on Romanați, counted among its members poet Horia Furtună, sculptor Dumitru Pavelescu-Dimo, and businessman Sterie Ionescu (formerly of the League Against Usury). It still existed ahead of a general election in December 1937, when it ran under a "T" logo, the old PNA symbol having been withdrawn and made unavailable for use. On December 20, just ahead of the vote, it agreed to merge into the National Liberal Party, which Valjean had identified as a "guarantee for the country's future". The Goga group continued to have autonomous existence within the PNC, notably by serving as the more Carlist branch, and therefore more directly supported by the king. It was itself weakened by defections—described by Mezarescu as "the logical consequence" of Goga's antisemitic turn. Of the PNA moderates, Lupaș no longer joined the PNC, whereas his colleague Dragomir did. Tudor Vianu left before the unification and the adoption of full-on antisemitism, with his brother resigning in 1935; by contrast, Streitman remained an outside ally, serving as the PNC's electoral agent. Goga himself became more explicitly antisemitic. Appointed Carol's Prime Minister after the 1937 election, he introduced a set of antisemitic laws. However, he continued to view himself as a moderate, censuring PNC radicals—including Gheorghe Cuza, who took pride in fomenting violence. Virulent antisemitism was also embraced by the Romani caucus of Craiova, whose leader, Lăzăreanu-Lăzurică, finally joined the PNC in February 1938.

Carol's eventual recall of the PNC cabinet that same month inaugurated a monarchist dictatorship: the 1938 Constitution proclaimed a corporate state, and all political parties were dissolved. However, the PNC was allowed to function on Carol's orders, with the hope that it could emerge as the country's mass party. The embittered Goga left the country and, having personally witnessed Germany's annexation of Austria, expressed support for a direct Nazi takeover in Romania. He died suddenly in May 1938, leaving the PNC to separate into its pre-1935 formations: while Cuza opted to fully support the dictatorial project, former PNA activists grouped into a dissident, if politically insignificant, Union of National Awareness (Uniunea Conștiinței Naționale, UCN). In December, the National Renaissance Front (FRN) was introduced as a sole legal party. Organized by Armand Călinescu, formerly of the PNȚ, the FRN was implicitly hostile toward Cuza's ideology. As a preliminary step, it recruited heavily among UCN representatives.

== Electoral history ==
=== Legislative elections ===
Election	Votes	Percentage	Chamber	Senate	Position
1932	108,857	3.8	8 / 387	0 / 113	7th
1933	121,748	4.2	9 / 387	0 / 108	6th

== See also ==
- Category:National Agrarian Party politicians

== Bibliography ==
- "Tablou indicând rezultatele pe circumscripții electorale ale alegerilor pentru Adunarea deputaților, efectuate în ziua de 20 Decembrie 1933", in Monitorul Oficial, Issue 300/1933, pp. 7950–8071.
- Lucian T. Butaru, Rasism românesc. Componenta rasială a discursului antisemit din România, până la Al Doilea Război Mondial. Cluj-Napoca: EFES, 2010. ISBN 978-606-526-051-1
- Nicolae Carandino, De la o zi la alta. Bucharest: Cartea Românească, 1979.
- Roland Clark, "Nationalism and Orthodoxy: Nichifor Crainic and the Political Culture of the Extreme Right in 1930s Romania", in Nationalities Papers, Vol. 40, Issue 1, January 2012, pp. 107–126.
- Armin Heinen, Legiunea 'Arhanghelul Mihail': o contribuție la problema fascismului internațional. Bucharest: Humanitas, 2006. ISBN 973-50-1158-1
- Richard S. Levy et al., Antisemitism: A Historical Encyclopedia of Prejudice and Persecution, Volume 1: A–K. Santa Barbara etc.: ABC-CLIO, 2005. ISBN 1-85109-439-3
- Irina Livezeanu, "Fascists and Conservatives in Romania: Two Generations of Nationalists", in Martin Blinkhorn (ed.), Fascists and Conservatives: The Radical Right and the Establishment in Twentieth-century Europe, pp. 218–239. Milton Park: Taylor & Francis, 2003. ISBN 0-203-39605-7
- Ion Mezarescu, Partidul Național-Creștin: 1935–1937. Bucharest: Editura Paideia, 2018. ISBN 978-606-748-256-0
- Adolf Minuț,
  - "Întemeierea Partidului Național Agrar (1932)", in Acta Moldaviae Meridionalis, Vol. XXI, 1999–2000, pp. 267–277.
  - "Activitatea Partidului Național Agrar (1932—1935)", in Acta Moldaviae Meridionalis, Vols. XXII–XXIII, Part I, 2001–2003, pp. 423–432.
- Victor Moldovan, Memoriile unui politician din perioada interbelică. Vol. I. Cluj-Napoca: Presa Universitară Clujeană, 2016. ISBN 978-973-595-971-5
- Lucian Nastasă, "Suveranii" universităților românești. Mecanisme de selecție și promovare a elitei intelectuale, Vol. I. Cluj-Napoca: Editura Limes, 2007. ISBN 978-973-726-278-3
- Virgil Nemoianu, "Portret de bunic", in Euphorion, Vol. 2, Issues 9–11, September–November 1991, pp. 6–7, 26–27.
- Vasile Netea, Memorii. Târgu Mureș: Editura Nico, 2010. ISBN 978-606-546-049-2
- Dan Oprescu, "Minoritățile naționale din România. O privire din avion", in Sfera Politicii, Issue 4 (158), April 2011, pp. 29–43.
- Stanley G. Payne, A History of Fascism 1914–45. London: Routledge, 2003. ISBN 0-203-80956-4
- Sorin Radu, "Semnele electorale ale partidelor politice în perioada interbelică", in Anuarul Apulum, Vol. XXXIX, 2002, pp. 574–586.
- Andrea Varga, "În loc de concluzii", in Lucian Nastasă, Andrea Varga (eds.), Minorități etnoculturale. Mărturii documentare. Țiganii din România (1919–1944), pp. 627–643. Cluj-Napoca: Fundația CRDE, 2001. ISBN 973-85305-2-0
