= Nichifor Crainic =

Romanian writer, philosopher, poet and theologian (1889 - 1972)

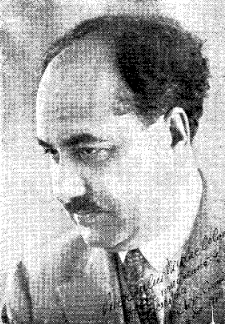

Minister of National Propaganda
- In office 4 July 1940 – 14 September 1940
- Prime Minister: Ion Gigurtu; Ion Antonescu
- Preceded by: Teofil Sidorovici
- Succeeded by: Position temporarily suspended
- In office 27 January 1941 – 26 May 1941
- Prime Minister: Ion Antonescu
- Preceded by: Himself
- Succeeded by: Mihai Antonescu

State Secretary at the Ministry of Culture and Religious Affairs
- In office 14 September 1940 – 21 January 1941
- Prime Minister: Ion Antonescu
- Minister: Traian Brăileanu

Co-Leader of the National Christian Party
- In office 16 July 1935 – 10 February 1938 Serving with Octavian Goga & A. C. Cuza
- Preceded by: Octavian Goga (as president of the National Agrarian Party); A. C. Cuza (as president of the National-Christian Defense League)
- Succeeded by: None (party banned under the 1938 Constitution)

Personal details
- Born: December 22, 1889 Bulbucata, Giurgiu County, Kingdom of Romania
- Died: August 20, 1972 (aged 82) Mogoșoaia, Ilfov County, Socialist Republic of Romania
- Party: National-Christian Defense League (before 1935); National Christian Party (1935–1938)
- Education: University of Bucharest; University of Vienna
- Occupation: Writer, Professor, Politician
- Profession: Theologian, Philosopher

Nichifor Crainic (Romanian pronunciation: [niˈcifor ˈkrajnik]; 22 December 1889 – 20 August 1972), also known by his nom de plume Ion Dobre, was a Romanian writer, editor, philosopher, poet and theologian famed for his traditionalist activities. Crainic was a professor of theology at the Bucharest Theological Seminary and the Chișinău Faculty of Theology. He was also a politician and ideologue associated with far-right, racist, fascist, and antisemitic positions. (Note: Sources for 'antisemitic')

== Literary career ==
Crainic was a contributor of poetry to the modernist magazine Gândirea. After become disenfranchised with the publication's progressive views, rather than disassociate with the magazine he became increasingly intertwined in leadership positions in order to de-modernize it. At the end of a series of intellectual sparings within the publication itself, Crainic managed to wrest control of the magazine and institute a sea-change in editorial character supporting mystical Orthodoxy.

He developed an ideology given the name Gândirism (from gând – "thought"), a nationalist and neo-Orthodox Christian social and cultural trend. He edited the Gândirea magazine, and collaborated with numerous other publications such as Ramuri, România Nouă, Cuvântul, and Sfarmă-Piatră. He was also the editor in chief of the newspaper Calendarul.

== Politics ==
Nichifor Crainic became a leading pro-Fascist figure in the political turmoil of the late 1930s, openly praising Mussolini and Hitler. He was an ideologue of antisemitism, albeit primarily based in religion rather than racialism. His beliefs were a major influence on the Iron Guard legionary movement, although Crainic viewed himself as a supporter of the legionnaires' rival King Carol II. In a 1938 essay, he theorised the "ethnocratic state" as applied to Romania:

Our state is monarchical throughout its entire history. The monarchy is the principle of its continuity. The crown of the Romanian king symbolizes the glory of the people and the permanence of Romanian consciousness. ... The ethnocratic state differs profoundly from the democratic state. The democratic state is based on the number of population, without racial or religious distinction. The foundation of the ethnocratic state is the Romanian soil and people. ... The soil of the Romanian people has today inhabitants of other races and faiths, as well. They came here through invasion (like the Hungarians), through colonization (like the Germans), or through crafty infiltrations (like the Jews). ... The Jews are a permanent danger for every national state.

— Crainic, Program of the Ethnocratic State

A fulfillment of ethnocracy was to be achieved through the means of a monarch-led corporatist system:

Popularized and accepted by the entire nation, executed by government teams selected from the elites of the professions and controlled by parliament, it [a plan to redress Romania] will be supervised by His Majesty the King. ... The corporatist regime culminates in royal authority.

— Crainic, Program of the Ethnocratic State

Crainic advocated creation of a Romanian spirit that was “antisemitic in theory and antisemitic in practice.” He applied his theological and rhetorical skills to breaking the Judeo-Christian relationship by arguing that the Old Testament was not Jewish, that Jesus had not been Jewish, and that the Talmud, which he saw as the incarnation of modern Jewry, was, first and foremost, a weapon to combat the Christian Gospel and to destroy Christians.

— Friling, Ioanid and Ionescu, 2005, BACKGROUND AND PRECURSORS TO THE HOLOCAUST Roots of Romanian Antisemitism The League of National Christian Defense and Iron Guard Antisemitism The Antisemitic Policies of the Goga Government and of the Royal Dictatorship

In 1940 he was elected a member of the Romanian Academy. He studied theology at the Seminary in Bucharest, and received his Ph.D. diploma from the University of Vienna.

== After World War II ==
After the Soviet army defeated the Germans and occupied Romania, Crainic went into hiding. A trial was conducted in his absence and he was found guilty of crimes against the people. He was eventually caught and imprisoned by the Romanian authorities in 1947, and spent 15 years in Văcărești and Aiud prisons. He was expelled from the Academy by the Communist regime.

Between 1962 and 1968 he was the editor of the Communist propaganda magazine Glasul Patriei ("The Voice of the Fatherland")—a magazine published in Romania by the Romanian Communist regime but sold only abroad, which they used as a tool to try to influence the Romanian intellectual émigrés to be patriotic and not work against the Communist Romania.

Described by the historian Zigu Ornea as "always adaptable" (249), Nichifor Crainic (1889–1972) joined and left a number of these groups while repeatedly attempting to establish himself as an ideologue who could draw the various ultra-nationalist parties together into a united front. ... Crainic occupied senior positions within right-wing regimes between 1940 and 1944, and after he was released from prison in the 1960s the Romanian Communist Party used his talents and reputation as an informer and a “reformed” ultra-nationalist to add credibility to its regime.

— Clark (2012: 108)

On 8 May 1995, after the fall of Communism, 10 of the sentences pronounced during the Post-World War II Romanian war crime trials were overturned by the Supreme Court of Justice. They were part of the 14 war criminals convicted in the "Journalists' trial" of 1945. Attorney General Vasile Manea Drăgulin presented the convictions decided upon in 1945 as illegal, believing the interpretation of the evidence to have been “retroactive, truncated, and tendentious”, therefore amounting to a “conviction decision, whose content is a synthesis of vehement criticism of their activity, to which we forcefully ascribed the character of war crimes”. The most notorious name in this lot was likely that of Crainic. An ardent pro-fascist and admirer of Adolf Hitler and Benito Mussolini, he was vice-president of the National Christian Party and then Antonescu's Minister of Propaganda. Crainic was among the 10 who were rehabilitated and he was welcomed back into the Romanian Academy.
