= Octavian Goga =

Romanian politician and poet (1881–1938)

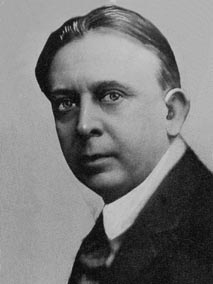

37th Prime Minister of Romania
- In office 28 December 1937 – 10 February 1938
- Monarch: Carol II
- Preceded by: Gheorghe Tătărescu
- Succeeded by: Miron Cristea

Minister of the Interior
- In office 30 March 1926 – 4 June 1927
- Prime Minister: Alexandru Averescu
- Preceded by: Ion I. C. Brătianu
- Succeeded by: Barbu Știrbey (interim)

Minister of Culture and Religious Affairs
- In office 13 June 1920 – 16 December 1921
- Prime Minister: Alexandru Averescu
- Preceded by: Ion Borcea
- Succeeded by: Vasile Dumitrescu-Brăila
- In office 5 December 1919 – 16 December 1919
- Prime Minister: Alexandru Vaida-Voevod
- Preceded by: Alexandru Lupescu
- Succeeded by: Ion Borcea

Co-Leader of the National Christian Party
- In office 16 July 1935 – 10 February 1938 Serving with A. C. Cuza & Nichifor Crainic
- Preceded by: Himself (as president of the National Agrarian Party); A. C. Cuza (as president of the National-Christian Defense League)
- Succeeded by: None (party banned under the 1938 Constitution)

Founding President of the National Agrarian Party
- In office 10 April 1932 – 16 July 1935
- Succeeded by: Himself (party merged into the National Christian Party)

Personal details
- Born: April 1, 1881 Resinár, Austria-Hungary
- Died: May 7, 1938 (aged 57) Ciucea, Cluj County, Kingdom of Romania
- Party: Romanian National Party (before 1918); People's Party (1918–1932); National Agrarian Party (1932–1935); National Christian Party (1935–1938)
- Spouses: Hortensia Goga (b. Cosma) (m. 1906–1920) Veturia Goga (b. Mureșan) (m. 1921–1938)
- Profession: poet, journalist
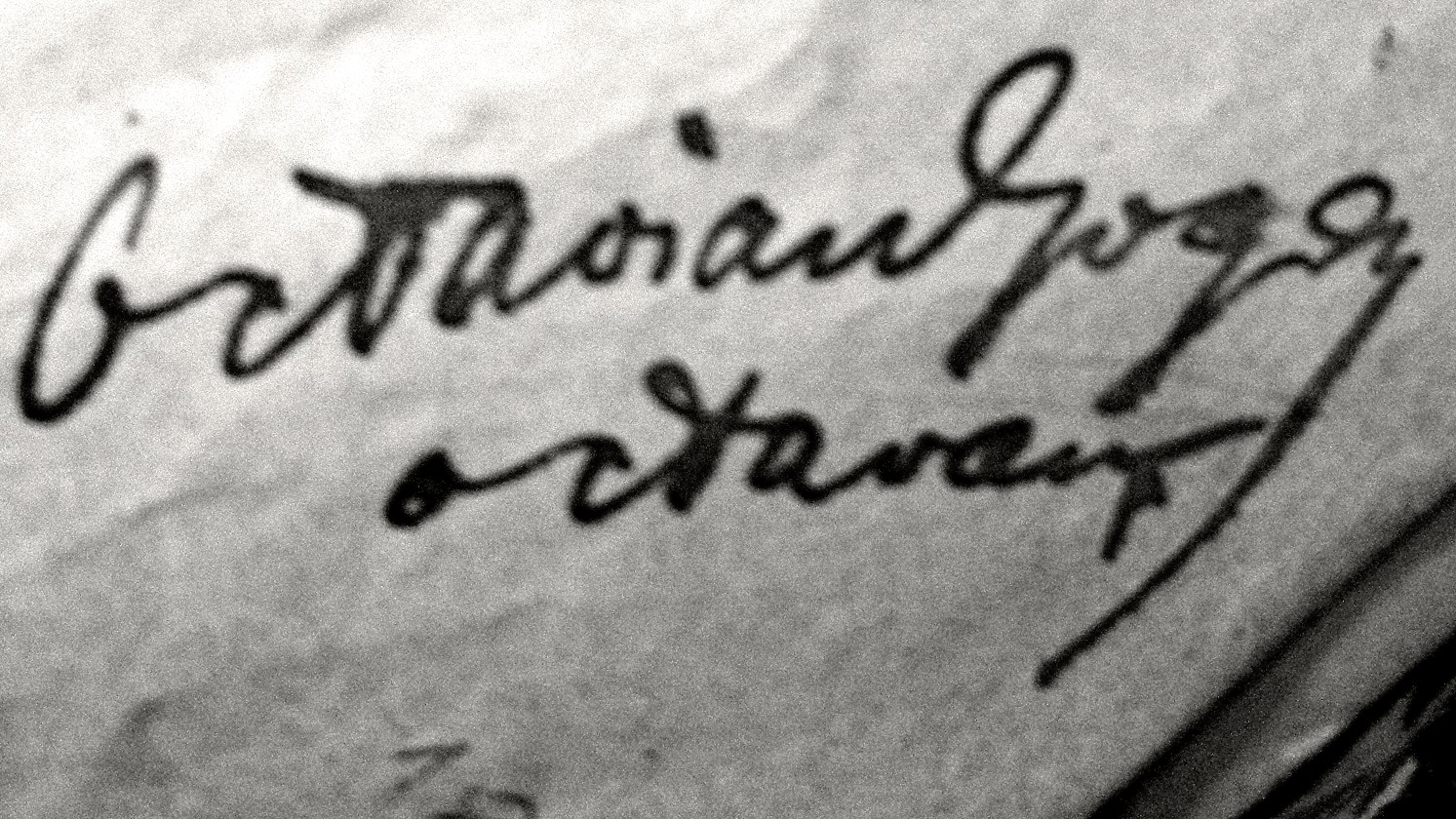
- Signature

Octavian Goga (Romanian pronunciation: [oktaviˈan ˈɡoɡa]; 1 April 1881 – 7 May 1938) was a Romanian far-right politician, poet, and writer who served as Prime Minister of Romania.

== Early life ==
Octavian Goga was born on 1 April 1881 in the village of Resinár, Szeben County, Kingdom of Hungary (part of Austro-Hungarian Empire), (today Rășinari, Romania), on the northern slopes of the Southern Carpathians, in the house at 778 Ulița Popilor, the son of the Aromanian Orthodox priest Iosif Goga and Aurelia, a teacher (and a collaborator in his youth at the newspaper Telegraful Român and the magazine Familia). Between 1886 and 1890, Goga attended primary school in his native village.

Most of his holidays, as he recounts in various autobiographical texts, were spent in his father's native village, Felsőkarácsonyfalva, a village on the Târnava Mică, (today Crăciunelu de Sus, part of the commune of Cetatea de Baltă, Alba County, Romania), where about 20% of the families in the village bear the name Goga. Goga said: "The life of the peasants on the delnițele Crăciunelului was my inspiration for Plugarii & Clăcașii.

In 1890 Goga enrolled at the state high school in Nagyszeben (today Sibiu, Romania), the school which is called today Gheorghe Lazăr National College). In 1899 he transferred to the Romanian high school in Brassó (today Brașov, Romania), which is called now Andrei Șaguna National College). After graduating from high school in 1900, he enrolled at the Faculty of Letters and Philosophy of the University of Budapest, continuing his studies in Berlin and completing them in 1904.

On 14 October 1906 he married Hortensia Cosma, the youngest daughter of the politician and banker Partenie Cosma, director of the Albina Bank in Nagyszeben, one of the wealthiest Romanians in Transylvania. The ceremony took place at the Metropolitan Cathedral in Nagyszeben, with Alexandrina and Alexandru Vlahuță as godparents. The marriage broke up after 14 years, when Goga fell in love with the singer Veturia Triteanu, born Mureșan, whom he married in January 1921.

Goga was a member of the Romanian National Committee in Paris toward the end of World War I.

== Poetry ==
In the issue of 12–24 December (no. 275, p. 1098) the newspaper Tribuna (Nagyszeben) published his first poem, Atunci și acum, signed "Tavi". Ion Pop-Reteganul from the Revista Ilustrată (Beszterce) wrote to him at the editorial office: "You have talent, young friend, cultivate it with diligence, for you can become great. The good day in the morning shows itself. Don't neglect your student duties." After this encouragement, the poem Nu-i fericire pe pământ was published on half a page. Goga, a student at the Hungarian-language high school in Nagyszeben, had not yet turned seventeen.

The following poems he published in Iosif Vulcan's Revista Familia (Oradea, year XXXIV, 1898, no. 44, p. 13, November) and in the newspapers Tribuna and Luceafărul (no. 11, 1 December 1902, no. 14–15, 1 August 1903) were signed, above all, also "Octavian" and then "Nic. Otavă". It was not until 15 September 1903 that he signed his first poem (Sfârșit de septembrie) in Luceafărul under the name "Octavian Goga".

On July 1, 1902, Luceafărul, a publication for national culture and political unity of the Romanians in Transylvania, appeared in Budapest, where Goga published most of his poems. The founding of the magazine was due to the Romanian students who were active in Budapest within the "Petru Maior" Society: Alexandru Ciura, the author of the article "In lieu de programme" in the first issue, and Goga, who said in 1933 that the title of the magazine "was related to the state of mind and literary consciousness of those times". Most of Goga's works included in the volume Poezii (1905) appeared in the magazine Luceafărul.

In 1904 his poem Oltul appeared in Luceafărul (year III, no. 4, February 15, p. 91–92), then in no. 7, April 10, p. 151, the poem Dăscălița, signed "Nic. Otavă", and in 1905, the poems Plugarii, Lăutarul, Dascălul, Rugăciune, and Clăcașii.

=== Election to the Romanian Academy ===
With the award of the "Năsturel-Herescu" Prize for his debut volume on March 21, 1906, Octavian Goga's poetic creation received the consecration of the Romanian Academy. The report to the plenary of the Romanian Academy for the award of the volume Poems was presented in February 1906 by Titu Maiorescu.

In 1920, Goga was elected a member of the academy, his acceptance speech being entitled George Coșbuc. In 1924, Goga received the National Poetry Prize and the Mihail Sadoveanu Prize for prose.

== Political career ==
Goga was elected literary secretary of the Transylvanian Association for Romanian Literature and Culture of the Romanian People (ASTRA) in September 1906 and, together with Octavian Codru Tăslăuanu, politicized the activities of the most important cultural institution in Transylvania. Through articles published in the magazine Țara noastră, he took a critical stance towards the exploitation to which the Romanian peasants were subjected and towards Romania's then rulers. As a consequence of these attitudes, Goga was detained in the winter of 1911 for a month in the Seghedin prison, where he was visited by Ion Luca Caragiale, who protested against his arrest in his article Situație penibilă. Two years later, in 1913, Goga was arrested again, in Seghedin.

After the outbreak of World War I, Goga settled in Romania, continuing the struggle for the Union of Transylvania with Romania and for the completion of Romanian state unity. He launched an extensive publicity campaign in the newspapers Adevărul and Epoca on the situation of the brothers across the Carpathians, who were subject to persecution. Together with Octavian Codru Tăslăuanu, Onisifor Ghibu and Sebastian Bornemisa, he signed the letter to the Transylvanian journalists who had taken refuge in Romania (Epoca, 15 June 1915), with the aim of continuing the publicity work for the union of Transylvania.

On 14 December 1914, the "Extraordinary Congress of the Cultural League" was held (president Vasile Lucaciu, vice-president: Barbu Ștefănescu Delavrancea, secretary: Nicolae Iorga, and Goga was a member of the committee, representing Transylvania).

At the meeting organized by the "Political League of All Romanians", in Bucharest, on February 15, 1915, he declared: "For tomorrow's sacrifice we have crossed the border, let us come to Wallachia. We have lost our country, we have lost our homeland, but we still have our heads. We give them to you, do what you want with them. They can fall, Transylvania cannot fall".

Because of his political activity in Romania, the Hungarian government in Budapest brought Goga - as an Austro-Hungarian citizen - to trial for high treason and sentenced him to death in absentia. He joined the Romanian army and fought as a soldier in Dobrogea. When hostilities ended and the peace was signed in Bucharest, Goga was forced to leave Romania for France. In the summer of 1918, the "National Council of Romanian Unity" was set up in Paris, a forum for putting pressure on the great powers to achieve Romanian state unity. At the beginning of 1919, Goga returned to Greater Romania.

=== Romanian "Duce" or "Führer" ===
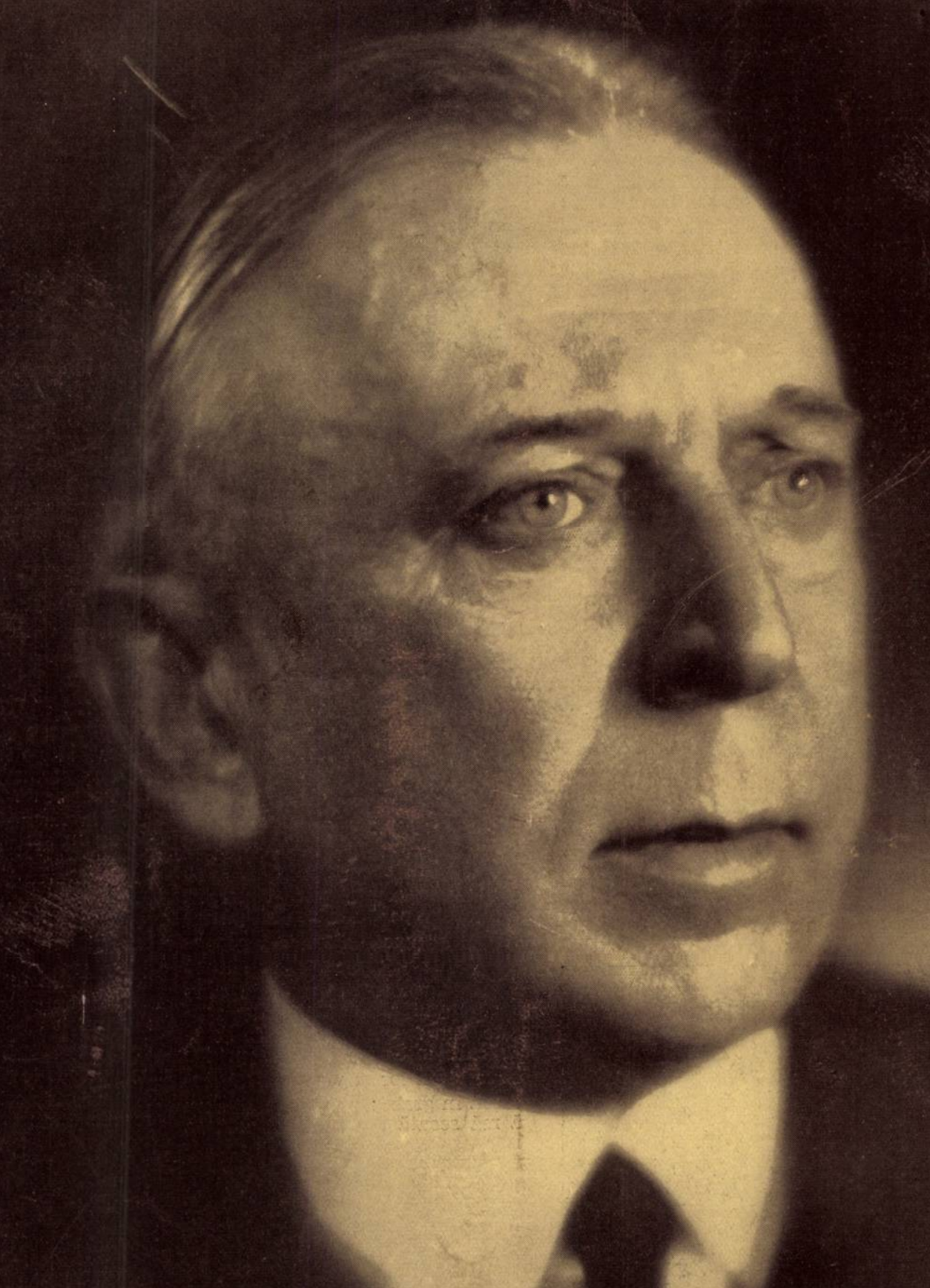
Goga in 1938

According to historian Ilarion Țiu, in the 1920s Goga was a supporter of parliamentary democracy, but after 1930 his views changed radically, sympathizing with Italian fascism and German Nazism. He was one of the leaders of the Romanian nationalist movement.

... The Prime Minister appointed by King Carol (II), the liberal Gheorghe Tătărescu ... fails to win the elections (obtaining only 36% of the votes instead of the 40 percent required—by law—to hold a majority in Parliament). ... This electoral failure was due in part to a "non-aggression pact between Iuliu Maniu's nationalist peasants and the "All for the Country" party (the Legion's electoral label). ... The King brought to the government two leaders of small far-right parties: the poet Octavian Goga and Professor A. C. Cuza, head of a party focused exclusively on anti-Semitism.

— Neagu Djuvara

In 1926 together with Vasile Goldiș, Ioan Lupaș, and Silviu Dragomir, Octavian Goga left the Romanian National Party and joined General Alexandru Averescu's People's Party (PP), a populist movement created upon the war's end. Interestingly, Goga, Goldiș, Lupaș, and Dragomir were all Orthodox, whereas the PNR leader Iuliu Maniu and other remaining members of the PNR were Greek-Catholic. Goga clashed with Averescu over the latter's conflict with King Carol II. Together with Goldiș, Lupaș, and Dragomir, Goga founded the National Agrarian Party on April 10, 1932.

On 14 July 1935, National Agrarian Party (under Goga's leadership) merged with the National-Christian Defense League to form the National Christian Party.

In December 1937, following general election in which the party finished fourth, Goga was invited by King Carol II to form a government. He took office as prime minister on 28 December.

As Prime Minister, Goga pursued a pro-Nazi policy by intending to ally with and adopt the policies of Nazi Germany and Fascist Italy and pursued an antisemitic policy by denying the legal rights of the Jewish population. The former Romanian minority freed from Habsburg oppression and turned politician, propelled to the leadership of the majority population, outperformed his teachers in the minority populations thrust. He turned out to be a xenophobic extremist, with fascist and clearly antisemitic views. The historian Florin Constantiniu writes in his book O istorie sinceră a poporului român that the great poet Goga was in a state of dismay because he "believed himself to be and wanted to be a Romanian 'duce' or 'führer'".

The paramilitary wing of the National Christian Party, the Lănceri (meaning "Lancers", the word was derived from LANC, the Romanian acronym of National-Christian Defense League) contributed to the chaos, attacking both Jews and Iron Guard members.

Carol II first pushed towards a victory of the government in the snap elections in March 1938, which he had called on January 18, 1938. However, he soon abandoned Goga, preparing a coup together with the Minister of the Interior Armand Călinescu, a former member of the National Peasants' Party, who acted as a guarantee for the King in the government. The coup was likely precipitated when Goga negotiated an electoral agreement with Corneliu Zelea Codreanu, the leader of the Iron Guard, on February 8, 1938, thus posing a considerable threat to the King's power. On February 9, 1938, Carol II, Călinescu and the former National Liberal prime minister Gheorghe Tătărescu set the coup for the next day. On February 10, 1938, Carol II received Goga and told him to postpone the snap elections, whereupon Goga resigned. Goga refused to participate in the national unity government the King appointed the same day and withdrew to his estate in Ciucea, Transylvania.

=== Antisemitic policies ===
Throughout the interwar period, Goga espoused antisemitic views in his writing, characterising the existence of Jews in Romania as contaminating the Romanian nation.

As a sine qua non for the recognition of its new borders, Romania had undertaken to grant full citizenship and equal rights to all minorities in chte country. In this regard, on 9 December 1919, the government of Prime Minister Alexandru Vaida-Voievod ordered General Constantin Coandă to sign with the Allied and Associated Powers the "Treaty on Minorities", annexed to the Peace Treaty with Austria. Vaida-Voievod's predecessor, Ion I.C. Brătianu, had categorically refused to sign, leaving, in protest, the work of the Paris Peace Conference in May 1919. The provisions of the minorities' treaty were subsequently legislated by the Constitution of 29 March 1923 and the Law of 25 February 1924, whereby all inhabitants, former citizens of the Austro-Hungarian Empire and Tsarist Russia, who had administrative residence in Transylvania, Banat, Crișana, and Maramureș on 1 December 1918, in Bukovina on 28 November 1918 and in Bessarabia on 9 April 1918, acquired Romanian citizenship with full rights.

Under the pretext that between 1918 and 1924 Jews from the former Austro-Hungarian and Russian Empires had infiltrated Romania, the government chaired by Octavian Goga, in violation of the Constitution and Romania's international obligations, published on 21 January 1938 Decree No. 169 on the revision of citizenship, by virtue of which Romanian Jewish citizens were forced to prove their right to citizenship with documents, in accordance with the law of 25 February 1924, within 20 days of the posting of lists in communes and towns. On the basis of this decree, the situation of 617,396 Jews was reviewed, of whom 392,172 (63.50%) retained their Romanian citizenship and 225,222 (36.50%) lost it. The Jews who lost their citizenship received identity certificates valid for one year, with the possibility of extension, and were considered foreigners without a passport, subject to the legal regime as such.

This was the first in a series of discriminatory laws, adopted as part of a policy of ethnic cleansing, whereby the Romanian state abandoned its citizens of Jewish origin, depriving them of the most basic civic rights. The Jewish minority, left to the whim of despotic regional civil servants, began to expatriate. A wave of Romanian intellectuals and industrialists of Jewish origin left Romania, Romanian economy and culture were damaged, and leading intellectuals protested vehemently.

In an interview with the British newspaper Daily Herald in January 1938, King Carol II and then-Prime Minister Goga gave the figure of 250,000 and 500,000 Jews respectively as "illegal". While the King rejected the idea of expulsion and denying them any rights, Goga spoke of 500,000 so-called "vagrants", whom "we cannot consider as Romanian citizens". Goga, however, proposed the deportation of 500,000 Jews to Madagascar (a concept known as the Madagascar Plan). Goga said that "there is only one final solution of the Jewish problem—the collection of all Jews into a region that is still uninhabited, and the foundation there of a Jewish nation. And the further away the better."

=== Goga and Freemasonry ===
The Forty-Eighters, Bonjuriists and other Romanians with studies abroad imported the fashion of Freemasonry, to which the Romanian intelligentsia opted—with unequal enthusiasm and fidelity. Although invested as a Freemason, Goga did not understand the ideals of the confraternity: "... April 1929: Octavian Goga militates for the founding of the Freemasonic Christian Bloc. Octavian Goga, who, although a Freemason, has no idea of the purpose of Freemasonry, because he allowed himself to talk about Christianity in the lodge—a mistake the Masons will never forgive him for. D. Goga went so far with his naivety that he proposed that the National Lodge be called the Christian National Lodge".

== Retirement and death ==
Goga retired alone at Ciucea Castle—his wife Veturia Goga preferred to stay in Bucharest. he suffered a stroke with hemiplegia in the park of the manor house on 5 May 1938 and fell into a coma. He died two days later, on 7 May 1938 at 2.15 pm, aged 57. King Carol II ordered a national funeral for him which, due to the 10th May holiday, was to begin on 11 May. For two days, on Sunday 8 May and Monday 9 May, the pilgrimage continued in front of the catafalque in Ciucea. On Tuesday 10 May, the funeral train left for Bucharest. The coffin was placed on Wednesday 11 May in the rotunda of the Athenaeum, where it remained until Saturday 14 May, when the national funeral took place. In accordance with his will, no words were spoken and a Nazi swastika was placed on the body.

Goga was buried in Bucharest, at Bellu Cemetery. Later his body was reburied at his mansion in Ciucea, according to his wishes.

== Other writing ==
=== Drama ===
Though primarily a poet, Goga also wrote plays, such asDomnul notar. The play premiered at the National Theatre of Bucharest on 14 February 1914.

With Meșterul Manole, performed in 1927 and published in 1928, Goga attempted to adapt the old myth to psychological drama, artistically rehabilitating the old plot of conjugal time by developing and examining erotic motivations.

Goga also left, as a draft, two one-act plays (Sonata lunei and Lupul), the sketch Fruntașul, a dialogue article from 1911 and the translation of Imre Madách's The Tragedy of Man.

=== Translation ===
An opponent of the Transylvanian policy of the Hungarian governments, Goga was at the same time an admirer of classical and modern Hungarian literature. He studied the works of Sándor Petőfi and Imre Madách from his high school years in Nagyszeben and later as a student at the University of Budapest, and was a close friend of Endre Ady. Imre Madách attracted Goga from his youth, his first attempts at translating the Tragediei omului dating from his school years. After a few paintings and scenes from the Tragediei, published in Luceafărul in (1903) or in Țara noastră (1909), the appearance of the Tragediei omului in volume form in Goga's translation came in 1934, received as "a brilliant poetic creation having the same value as the original". The second Romanian edition (1940) appeared revised by the author.

Tudor Vianu wrote that Memento mori and Tragediei omului are "poems of humanity seen through the hopes, defeats and struggles of peoples". George Călinescu observed that Goga's translation is done in a Romanian that approaches the perfection and beauty of Eminescu's language: "It is the language and even the style of Eminescu that is appropriate to our time and it is precisely interesting to see a classical poet who manages to be plastic through words, for the ear, not through colorism".

== Gallery ==
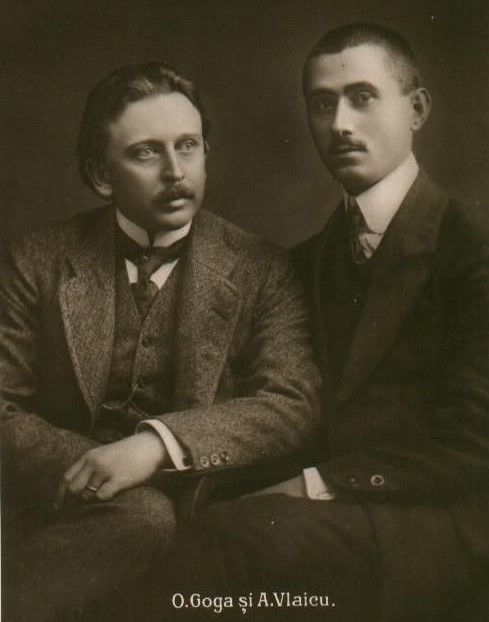
Goga and Aurel Vlaicu

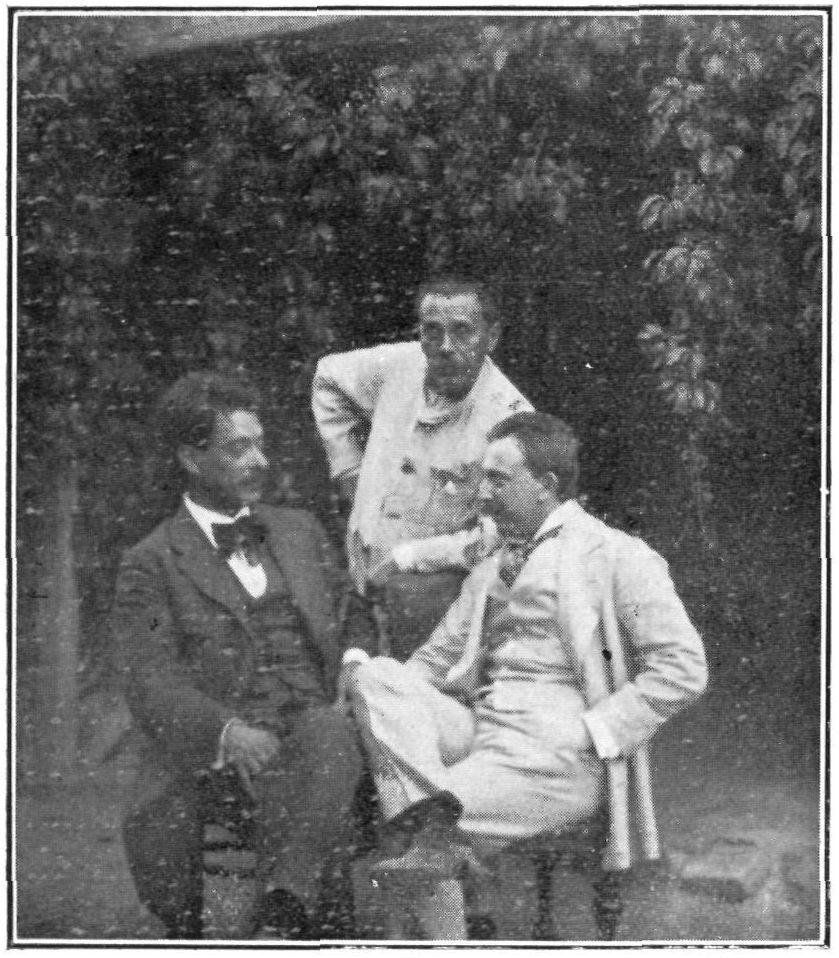
Goga and writers Ștefan Octavian Iosif and Ion Luca Caragiale

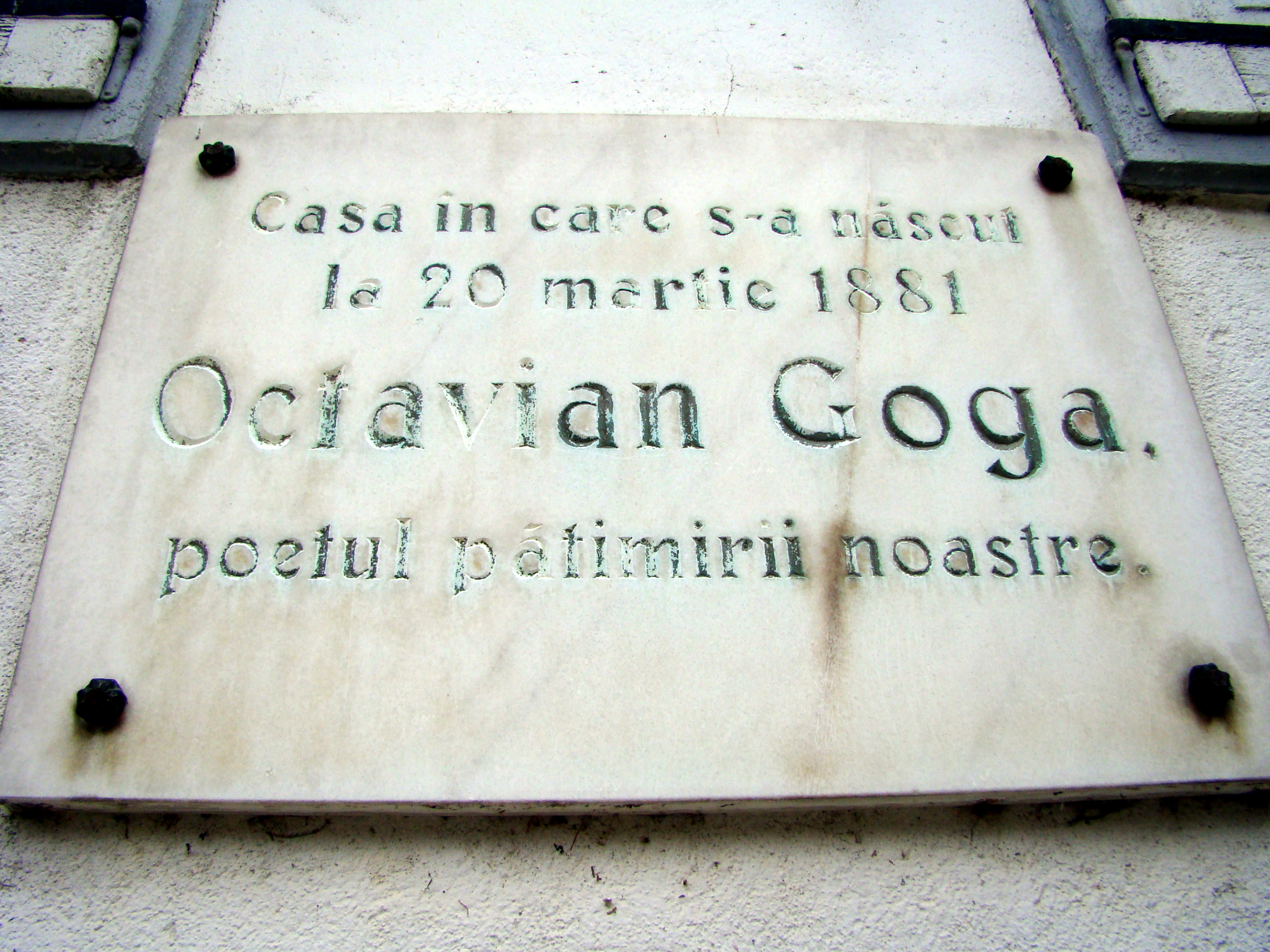
Commemorative plaque on Octavian Goga's birth home in Rășinari, which reads: "The house in which Octavian Goga, the poet of our sufferings, was born on 20 March 1881."

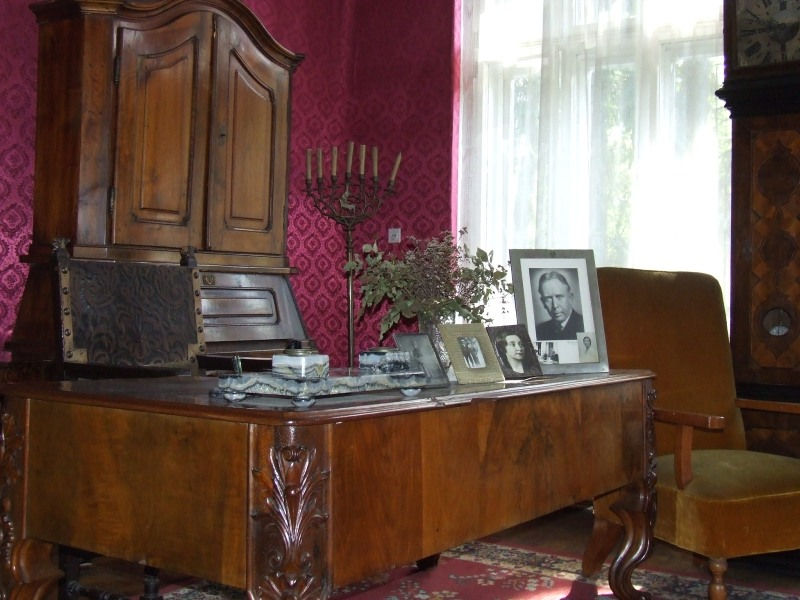
Goga's writing desk at his castle in Ciucea

Logo of the National Christian Party featuring a swastika, the initials of the party and the names of its joint leaders, A. C. Cuza and Octavian Goga

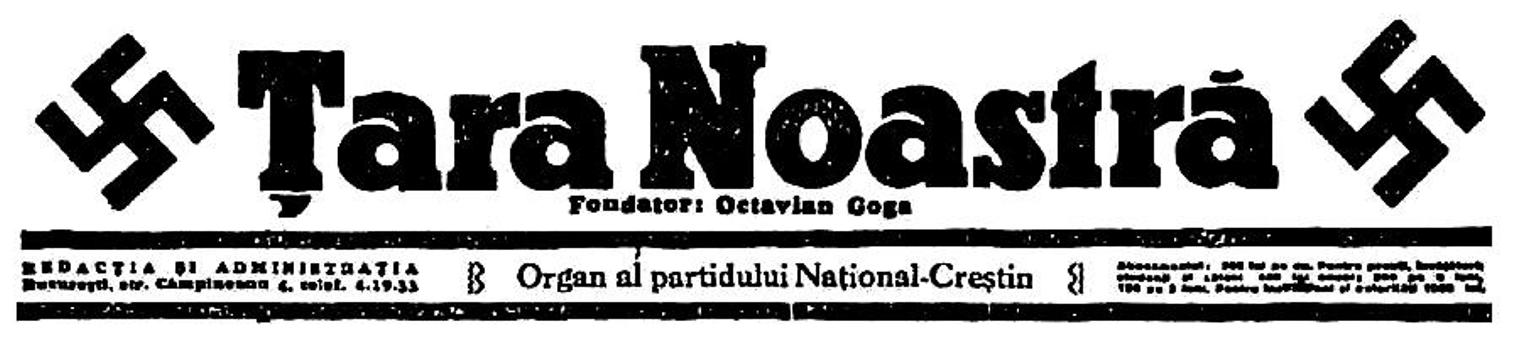
The header of Țara Noastră, the official newspaper of Goga's National Christian Party, in 1935.

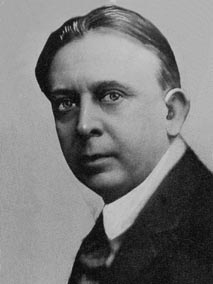
Goga in his later years

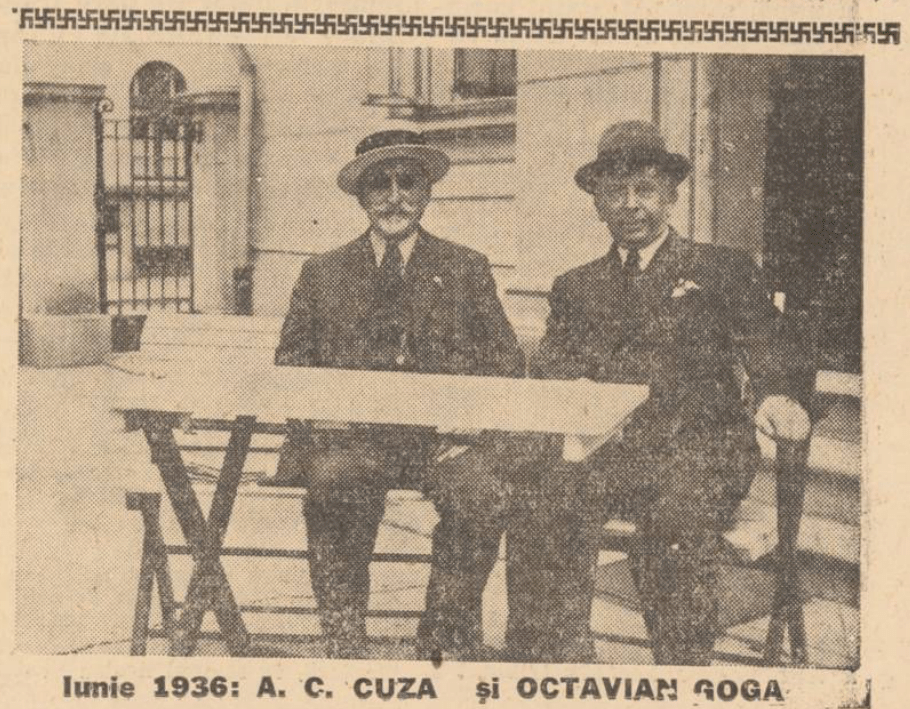
Goga and A. C. Cuza

== Writings ==
=== Poetry ===
- Cărbunii ("The Pieces of Coal")
- Rugăciune ("A Prayer")
- Plugarii ("The Ploughmen")
- Oltul ("The Olt River")
- Din larg ("From the High Seas")
- Profetul ("The Prophet")
- Ceahlăul ("The Ceahlău")
- O ramură întârziată ("A Tardy Branch")
- Trecutul ("The Past")
- Apus ("Sunset")
- Mare eternă ("The Eternal Sea")
- În mine câteodată ("At Times within Me")
- Toamna("Autumn")
- Noi ("Us")

=== Plays ===
- Domnul notar ("Mr. Notary")
- Meșterul Manole (see Meșterul Manole)
