= Lăncieri =

Romanian fascist paramilitary movement

The Lăncieri ("Lancers", Romanian pronunciation: [lən.tʃi'erʲ]) were a Romanian fascist paramilitary movement initially attached to the National-Christian Defense League (LANC), and following the merger on 16 July 1935 of the LANC and the National Agrarian Party to form the National Christian Party, the Lăncieri became associated with the merged party.

Members of the group adopted a blue shirt uniform and contributed to the country's political street battles in the 1920s and 1930s, and were noted in the 1920s for their attacks on that party's main target, the Jews, as well as general disruption of university life. Following the merger that formed the National Christian Party, the Lăncieri continued their wild ways, rivalling the Iron Guard (with whom they frequently clashed) in their violence and mayhem. Between 1935 and 1937, the Lăncieri carried out more terrorist actions and pogroms throughout Romania than the Iron Guard.

The 1937 general election campaign in particular was marred by clashes between the two fascist groups and not even the intervention of Alfred Rosenberg could unite the warring factions. Clashes between the two groups would continue, although the Lăncieri owed much of their organisation to the Iron Guard and indeed their continuing existence was as much an attempt to attract interest away from that group.
