= Gigurtu cabinet =

Government of Romania in 1940

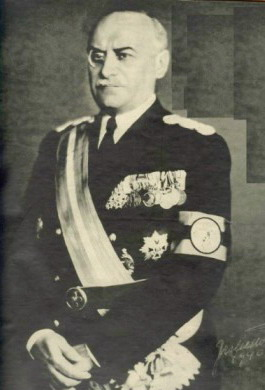
Ion Gigurtu

The cabinet of Ion Gigurtu was the government of Romania from 4 July to 4 September 1940.

== Composition ==
The ministers of the cabinet were as follows:

- President of the Council of Ministers:

- Ion Gigurtu (4 July - 4 September 1940)

- Vice President of the Council of Ministers:

- Gen. Gheorghe Mihail (4 July - 4 September 1940)

- Minister of the Interior:

- Gen. David Popescu (4 July - 4 September 1940)

- Minister of Foreign Affairs:

- Mihail Manoilescu (4 July - 4 September 1940)

- Minister of Finance:

- (interim) Gheorghe N. Leon (4 July - 4 September 1940)

- Minister of Justice:

- Ion V. Gruia (4 July - 4 September 1940)

- Minister of National Defence:

- Gen. Constantin Nicolaescu (4 July - 4 September 1940)

- Minister of Air and Marine:

- Adm. Nicolae Păiș (4 July - 4 September 1940)

- Minister of Materiel:

- Mihail Priboianu (4 July - 4 September 1940)

- Minister of National Economy:

- Gheorghe N. Leon (4 July - 4 September 1940)

- Minister of Agriculture and Property

- (interim) Gheorghe N. Leon (4 July - 4 September 1940)

- Minister of Public Works and Communications:

- Ion Macovei (4 July - 4 September 1940)

- Minister of Foreign Trade:

- (interim) Gheorghe N. Leon (4 July - 4 September 1940)

- Minister of National Education:

- Dumitru Caracostea (4 July - 4 September 1940)

- Minister of Religious Affairs and the Arts:

- Horia Sima (4 - 8 July 1940)
- Radu Budișteanu (8 July - 4 September 1940)

- Minister of Labour:

- Stan Ghițescu (4 July - 4 September 1940)

- Minister of Health and Social Security

- Victor Gomoiu (4 July - 4 September 1940)

- Minister of Public Wealth:

- Vasile Noveanu (4 July - 4 September 1940)

- Minister of Propaganda:

- Nichifor Crainic (4 July - 4 September 1940)

- Minister of State for Minorities:

- Hans Otto Roth (4 July - 4 September 1940)

Preceded by Sixth Tătărăscu cabinet	Cabinet of Romania; 4 July 1940 - 4 September 1940	Succeeded by First Antonescu cabinet
