= First Antonescu cabinet =

Romanian government during WWII

- 82nd Cabinet of Kingdom of Romania

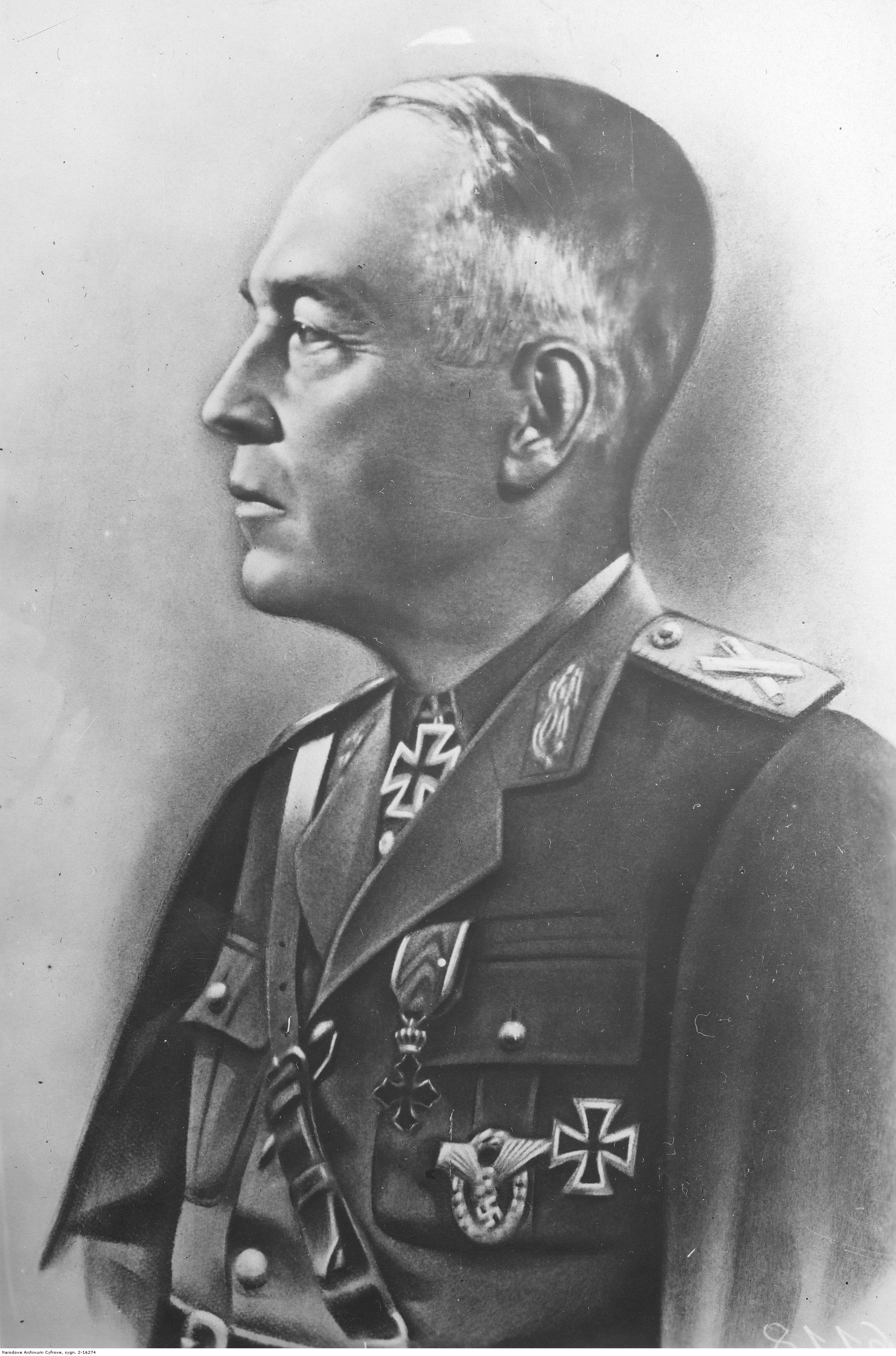
- Date formed: 4 September 1940
- Date dissolved: 14 September 1940

People and organisations
- Monarch: Carol II; Michael I
- President: Ion Antonescu
- Total no. of members: 11

History
- Predecessor: Gigurtu cabinet
- Successor: Second Antonescu cabinet

The first cabinet of Ion Antonescu was the government of Romania from 4 September to 14 September 1940.

== Composition ==
The ministers of the cabinet were as follows:

Portfolio	Minister	Took office	Left office
President of the Council of Ministers & Minister of National Defence	Gen. Ion Antonescu	4 September 1940	14 September 1940
Minister of Foreign Affairs	Mihail Manoilescu	4 September 1940	14 September 1940
Minister of the Interior	Gen. David Popescu	4 September 1940	14 September 1940
Minister of Justice	Ion V. Gruia	4 September 1940	14 September 1940
Minister of National Economy, acting Minister of Finance & acting Minister of Agriculture and Property	Gheorghe N. Leon	4 September 1940	14 September 1940
Minister of Public Works and Communications	Ion Macovei	4 September 1940	14 September 1940
Minister of Labour	Stan Ghițescu	4 September 1940	14 September 1940
Minister of Health and Social Security	Victor Gomoiu	4 September 1940	14 September 1940
Minister of National Education	Dumitru Caracostea	4 September 1940	14 September 1940
Minister of Religious Affairs and the Arts	Radu Budișteanu	4 September 1940	14 September 1940
Minister of Propaganda	Nichifor Crainic	4 September 1940	14 September 1940

== See also ==
- Second Antonescu cabinet
- Third Antonescu cabinet
- Romania in World War II
- Conducător

Preceded by Gigurtu cabinet	Cabinet of Romania; 4 September 1940 - 14 September 1940	Succeeded by Second Antonescu cabinet
