= Second Antonescu cabinet =

Government of Romania (1940–1941)

Third Antonescu cabinet
- Cabinet of Kingdom of Romania

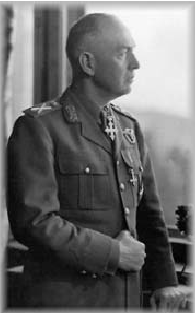
- Date formed: 14 September 1940
- Date dissolved: 27 January 1941

People and organisations
- Monarch: Michael I
- President of the Council of Ministers: Ion Antonescu
- President of the Council of Ministers's history: First cabinet; Third cabinet
- Deputy President of the Council of Ministers: Horia Sima; Mihai A. Antonescu

History
- Outgoing formation: Legionnaires' rebellion
- Predecessor: First Antonescu cabinet
- Successor: Third Antonescu cabinet

The second cabinet of Ion Antonescu was the government of Kingdom of Romania from 14 September 1940 to 24 January 1941. On September 14, Romania was declared a "National Legionary State". On 23 November 1940, Romania joined the Axis powers. The cabinet ended following Legionnaires' failed rebellion.

== Ministers ==
The ministers of the cabinet were as follows:

Portfolio	Minister	Took office	Left office	Party	Ref
President of the Council of Ministers	Ion Antonescu	14 September 1940	24 January 1941	Independent	
Vice President of the Council of Ministers	Horia Sima	14 September 1940	20 January 1941	TpȚ	
Vice President of the Council of Ministers	Mihai A. Antonescu	20 January 1941	24 January 1941	Independent	
Minister of State Secretary for the Department of Foreign Affairs	Mihail R. Sturdza	14 September 1940	20 January 1941	TpȚ	
Minister of State Secretary for the Department of Foreign Affairs	Ion Antonescu	20 January 1941	24 January 1941	Independent	
Minister of State Secretary for the Department of Internal Affairs	Constantin Petrovicescu	14 September 1940	20 January 1941	TpȚ	
Minister of State Secretary for the Department of Internal Affairs	Dimitrie I. Popescu	20 January 1941	24 January 1941	Independent	
Minister of State Secretary for the Department of Justice	Mihai A. Antonescu	14 September 1940	24 January 1941	Independent	
Minister of State Secretary for the Department of National Defence	Ion Antonescu	14 September 1940	24 January 1941	Independent	
Minister of State Secretary for the Department of National Economy	Gheorghe N. Leon	14 September 1940	10 November 1940	PNL	
Minister of State Secretary for the Department of National Economy	Mircea Cancicov	10 November 1940	24 January 1941	PNL	
Minister of State Secretary for the Department of Finance	George Cretzianu	14 September 1940	24 January 1941	Independent	
Minister of State Secretary for the Department of Agriculture and Property	Nicolae Mareș	14 September 1940	24 January 1941	Independent	
Minister of State Secretary for the Department of Public Works and Communications	Pompiliu Nicolau	14 September 1940	23 October 1940	Independent	
Minister of State Secretary for the Department of Public Works and Communications	Ion Protopopescu	23 October 1940	24 January 1941	Independent	
Minister of State Secretary for the Department of Labour, Health and Social Security	Vasile Iașinschi	14 September 1940	24 January 1941	TpȚ	
Minister of State Secretary for the Department of National Education, Religious Affairs and the Arts	Traian Brăileanu	14 September 1940	21 January 1941	TpȚ	
Minister of State Secretary for Coordination and Economic Status	Nicolae Dragomir	14 September 1940	24 January 1941	Independent	

== See also ==
- First Antonescu cabinet
- Third Antonescu cabinet
- Romania in World War II
- Conducător
