= Rehabilitation of war criminals in post-Communist Romania =

After the fall of Communism in Romania, between 1995 and 2004, a number of war criminals were rehabilitated by the Romanian Supreme Court. The rehabilitation process was part of the general efforts made by Romania to distance itself from its Communist past, as those convicted were sentenced after the country fell under Soviet influence in the wake of World War II. However, as a former Axis country during the Second World War, these rehabilitation initiatives put Romania at odds with the West (the United States in particular), as the former was seeking to join NATO and EU. Thus, the number of acquittals was relatively small, and rehabilitation initiatives ceased altogether in 2004, after Romania joined NATO.

== Chronology ==
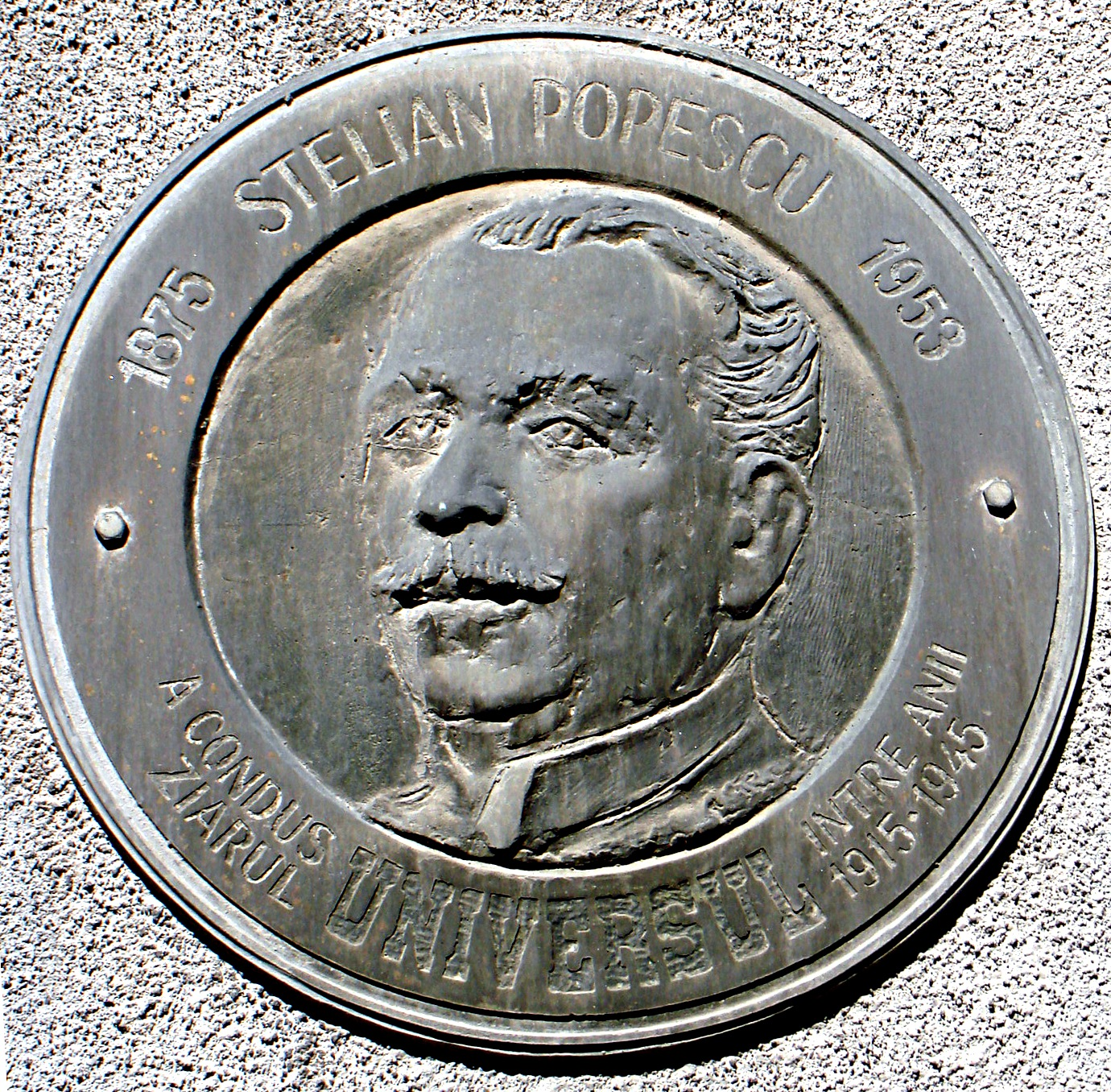
Stelian Popescu was sentenced for war crimes in 1945 and rehabilitated by the Supreme Court in 1995

On 8 May 1995, after the fall of Communism, 10 of the sentences pronounced by the "People's Tribunals" were overturned by the Supreme Court of Justice. They were part of the 14 war criminals convicted in the "Journalists' trial" of 1945. Only one of the ten, Pan M. Vizirescu, was in attendance when the proceedings took place. He was a cabinet director within the Propaganda Ministry. From 1940 to 23 August 1944, he was deputy director of the radio-journal of the Romanian Radio Broadcasting Company. Regarding his conviction, Vizirescu stated: "Knowing that this Court [the People's Court] was a terrorist organization and that the judges were mere terrorist agents, I chose not to go. I had this conscience of the truth, because they had no right to judge us - it should have been the other way around. I am now satisfied of being declared innocent and I will face God in all peace, for I was not guilty.". Attorney General Vasile Manea Drăgulin presented the convictions decided upon in 1945 as illegal, believing the interpretation of the evidence to have been “retroactive, truncated, and tendentious”, therefore amounting to a “conviction decision, whose content is a synthesis of vehement criticism of their activity, to which we forcefully ascribed the character of war crimes”. The most notorious name in this lot was likely that of Nichifor Crainic. An ardent pro-fascist and admirer of Adolf Hitler and Benito Mussolini, he was vice-president of the National Christian Party and then Antonescu's Minister of Propaganda. Crainic was also among the 10 who were rehabilitated and he was welcomed back into the Romanian Academy. Stelian Popescu and Romulus Dianu were also among the 10 who were rehabilitated, while Radu Gyr was among the remaining 4 who weren't.

Two Romanian Army colonels, Radu Dinulescu and Gheorghe Petrescu, were acquitted by the Romanian Supreme Court in 1998 and 1999, respectively. The two were convicted in 1953 of war crimes and crimes against humanity because they participated in the preparations for the Iași pogrom, they organized the deportations to Transnistria, and they mistreated prisoners of war and civilians. Dinulescu has been referred to as "the Eichmann of Romania". The two colonels were acquitted through a procedure called "extraordinary appeal", which was irreversible.

Between 1998 and 2000, three convicted wartime Government officials were rehabilitated. Following the Nuremberg Trials model, these were sentenced for "crimes against peace". On 26 October 1998, the Supreme Court rehabilitated Toma Ghițulescu. His acquittal was insisted upon due to the briefness of his term as Undersecretary of State in the National Economy Ministry (5 April to 26 May 1941) as well as the fact that he resigned before 30 June 1941, the date of the Iași pogrom. The case of Ghițulescu is however not unique, as the Romanian Supreme Court also rehabilitated Gheron Netta on 17 January 2000. Netta served as Finance Minister between 1 April and 23 August 1944, in the Third Antonescu cabinet, being also sentenced for "crimes against peace" after the war. In 1999, Prime Minister Ion Gigurtu, who preceded Ion Antonescu in 1940 and enacted a Romanian version of the Nuremberg laws, was also rehabilitated. It is also worth noting that Toma Ghițulescu was the only one out of the eight members of the Antonescu Government proposed for rehabilitation in 1998 who was acquitted. Pressures made by two US officials, Senator Alfonse D'Amato and Representative Christopher Smith, precluded the acquittal of the remaining seven. Romania was threatened with the reassessment of Western support for its integration within EU and NATO should the eight be acquitted.

Ion Pănescu, commander of the Chernivtsi Airport during World War II, was convicted in 1950 for using the regime of Jewish slave labor to his own advantage. He was acquitted in 2004, this time by the General Prosecutor's Office. That same year, the "extraordinary appeal" procedure – which was used to irreversibly acquit the previously mentioned war criminals – was eliminated from the Romanian legislation following recommendations from the European Court of Human Rights. This, however, backfired on those who wanted these rehabilitations undone, as Efraim Zuroff came to find out. When, in February 2004, Zuroff demanded that the Romanian authorities overturn the rehabilitations of Colonels Radu Dinulescu and Gheorghe Petrescu, he was informed that this was "technically impossible". Due to the abolition of "extraordinary appeal", a decision by the Supreme Court can no longer be challenged within the framework of Romanian legislation.
