= Third Antonescu cabinet =

Government of Romania from 1941 to 1944

- Cabinet of Kingdom of Romania

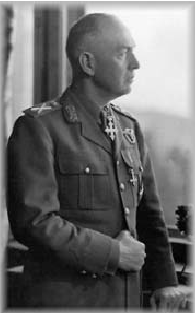
- Date formed: 27 January 1941
- Date dissolved: 23 August 1944

People and organisations
- Monarch: Michael I
- President of the Council of Ministers: Ion Antonescu
- President of the Council of Ministers's history: First cabinet; Second cabinet
- Deputy President of the Council of Ministers: Mihai A. Antonescu

History
- Incoming formation: Legionnaires' rebellion
- Outgoing formation: 1944 Romanian coup d'état
- Predecessor: Second Antonescu cabinet
- Successor: First Sănătescu cabinet

The third cabinet of Ion Antonescu was the government of Kingdom of Romania from 27 January 1941 to 23 August 1944. It was established following the Legionnaires' rebellion, and the expulsion of the Iron Guard from Antonescu's second cabinet.

On 22 June 1941, Romania entered World War II on the side of the Axis powers and invaded the Soviet Union.

Following the coup d'état by King Michael I, Antonescu and his cabinet was removed from power.

== Composition ==
The ministers of the cabinet were as follows:

Portfolio	Minister	Took office	Left office	Ref
President of the Council of Ministers	Ion Antonescu	27 January 1941	23 August 1944	
Vice President of the Council of Ministers	Mihai A. Antonescu	21 June 1941	23 August 1944	
Minister of State Secretary	Mihai A. Antonescu	27 January 1941	21 June 1941	
Minister of State Secretary and Propaganda	Nichifor Crainic	27 January 1941	1 April 1941	
Minister of Foreign Affairs	Ion Antonescu act.	27 January 1941	29 June 1941	
Minister of Foreign Affairs	Mihai A. Antonescu	29 June 1941	23 August 1944	
Minister of the Interior	Dumitru I. Popescu	27 January 1941	23 August 1944	
Minister of Justice	Gheorghe Docan	27 January 1941	15 February 1941	
Minister of Justice	Constantin C. Stoicescu	15 February 1941	14 August 1942	
Minister of Justice	Ion C. Marinescu	14 August 1942	23 August 1944	
Minister of National Defence	Iosif Iacobici	27 January 1941	22 September 1941	
Minister of National Defence	Ion Antonescu act.	22 September 1941	22 January 1942	
Minister of National Defence	Constantin Pantazi	22 January 1942	23 August 1944	
Minister of National Economy	Gheorghe Potopeanu	27 January 1941	26 May 1941	
Minister of National Economy	Ion C. Marinescu	26 May 1941	14 August 1942	
Minister of National Economy	Ion I. Fințescu	14 August 1942	19 February 1943	
Minister of National Economy	Gheorghe Dobre act.	19 February 1943	23 August 1944	
Minister of Finance	Nicolae Scarlat Stoenescu	27 January 1941	8 April 1942	
Minister of Finance	Ion C. Marinescu	8 April 1942	25 September 1942	
Minister of Finance	Alexandru D. Neagu	25 September 1942	1 April 1944	
Minister of Finance	Gheron Netta	1 April 1944	23 August 1944	
Minister of Agriculture and Property	Ion Sichitiu	27 January 1941	19 March 1942	
Minister of Agriculture and Property	Aurelian Pană	19 March 1942	3 July 1943	
Minister of Agriculture and Property	Ion Marian	3 July 1943	24 April 1944	
Minister of Agriculture and Property	Petre Nemoianu	24 April 1944	23 August 1944	
Minister of Public Works and Communications	Grigore Georgescu	27 January 1941	9 July 1941	
Minister of Public Works and Communications	Constantin Bușilă	9 July 1941	5 August 1943	
Minister of Public Works and Communications	Constantin Al. Constantinescu	6 October 1943	23 August 1944	
Minister of War Production	Gheorghe Dobre	16 September 1942	23 August 1944	
Minister of Labour, Health and Social Security	Petre Tomescu	27 January 1941	23 August 1944	
Minister of National Education, Religious Affairs and the Arts (Note: From 15 February 1941 called the Ministry of Instruction, Education, Religious Affairs and the Arts, and From 1 June 1941, called the Ministry of National Culture and Religious Affairs.)	Radu R. Rosetti	27 January 1941	11 November 1941	
Minister of National Education, Religious Affairs and the Arts	Ion Antonescu act.	11 November 1941	5 December 1941	
Minister of National Education, Religious Affairs and the Arts	Ion Petrovici	5 December 1941	23 August 1944	
Minister of Propaganda	Nichifor Crainic	1 April 1941	26 May 1941	
Minister of Propaganda	Mihai A. Antonescu act.	26 May 1941	23 August 1944	
Minister of Coordination and Economic Status	Nicolae Dragomir	27 January 1941	3 April 1941	

== See also ==
- First Antonescu cabinet
- Second Antonescu cabinet
- Romania in World War II
- Conducător
