= N. Porsenna =

Romanian lawyer, writer and publisher (1892–1971)

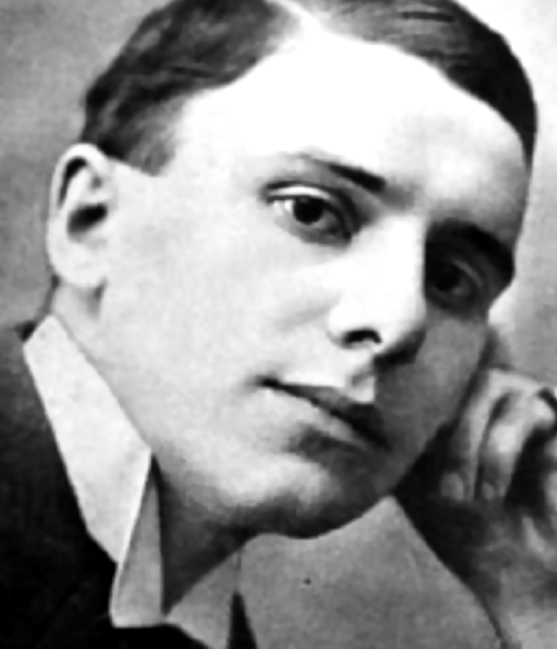
- Porsenna, c. 1920
- Born: Nicu Porsena Ionescu; 13 January 1892; Lipscani, Bucharest, Kingdom of Romania
- Died: 18 January 1971 (aged 79); Floreasca, Bucharest, Socialist Republic of Romania
- Resting place: Bellu Cemetery
- Occupations: Journalist; publisher; printer; lawyer; civil servant; politician; businessman
- Writing career
- Period: c. 1909–1971
- Genres: Essay; lyric poetry; short story; novel; metafiction; verse drama; satire; pastiche
- Movements: Modernist literature; Naturalism; Gândirea

N. Porsenna (pen name of Nicu Porsena Ionescu, also known as Nicu Porsenna or Porsena; 13 January 1892 – 18 January 1971) was a Romanian lawyer, writer, publisher, social psychologist, and political figure, also active as a paranormal investigator. Born to a successful printer, whose business he inherited at age 20, he began his career in letters, and his lifelong participation in polemics, while attending Matei Basarab National College. Before the outbreak of World War I, he had attracted attention as a student organizer, modernist raconteur, and Flacăra journalist, also founding his own short-lived newspaper, Latinul. During Romania's neutrality years, Porsenna veered between strong support for the Entente Powers (hinted at in a verse drama he co-wrote with Scarlat Froda) and a more cautious stance, akin to that of his political mentor, Alexandru Marghiloman. Upon Romania's declaration of war, he enlisted as an artillery cadet, and fought with distinction throughout the subsequent campaigns.

Porsenna returned to civilian life following capitulation in early 1918, and founded the daily Arena—possibly acting as an employee of his controversial friend, Alfred Hefter-Hidalgo. This venue supported Marghiloman, who had emerged as Romania's "Germanophile" Prime Minister; Porsenna joined the governing Conservatives ahead of elections in May 1918, winning a term in the Assembly of Deputies—and acquiring the reputation of a dreary public speaker. His months-long mandate witnessed a radical change in international affairs, with the Central Powers unable to build on their gains. Porsenna survived Marghiloman's downfall, and, in the early 1920s, was associated with the reemerging (and pro-Entente) National Liberal Party. This ended in 1922, when he questioned Romanian administrative policies in Bessarabia, sparking a national controversy. Following this rift, Porsenna allied with the far-right of Romanian nationalism, siding with the National-Christian Defense League, then joining the Romanian Front as a county councilor in Ilfov, and finally becoming a sympathizer of the Iron Guard. His essays in national psychology still challenged some of the core nationalist theses, and his critique of the nationalist doyen Nicolae Iorga contributed to his political marginalization.

Porsenna rebuilt his career in publishing, but his own activity as a novelist was largely ignored, or generally disliked, by the interwar critics. He also spent his own money on producing a film version of his novel Se-aprind făcliile ("They're Lighting Torches"), which came out just as World War II had started. The Nazi-aligned regime of Ion Antonescu assigned him to its Labor Ministry, where he became an advocate of social welfare and a corporatist doctrinaire; in tandem, he embarked on a celebrated career as a translator of world literature, especially focused on poetry by Oscar Wilde and Edgar Allan Poe. His association with the Antonescu regime brought his downfall upon Romania's changing of sides: though he remained active within the Democratic Peasants' Party–Lupu, he lost all his political privileges. The communist takeover in 1948 pushed him into hiding and near-complete seclusion, leading the Securitate to assume that he had escaped the country.

Porsenna was ultimately denounced and arrested in 1957, then prosecuted, alongside Petre Țuțea, for allegedly conspiring to bring the Iron Guard into power. Though accumulating a 50-year sentence, he was amnestied during the liberalization of 1964. By then, he was almost fully incapacitated by Parkinson's disease, and had to dictate his translations to an assistant. The relaxation of communist censorship allowed him to publish some of his works in this field, including a definitive, and best-selling, version of The Ballad of Reading Gaol. It appeared in early 1971, just after Porsenna had died in hospital. Some of his contributions to social science and parapsychology were given the occasional positive review before the end of communism in December 1989, after which his octogenarian widow, Zoe, tried to have most of them republished and reassessed.

== Biography ==
=== Early life ===
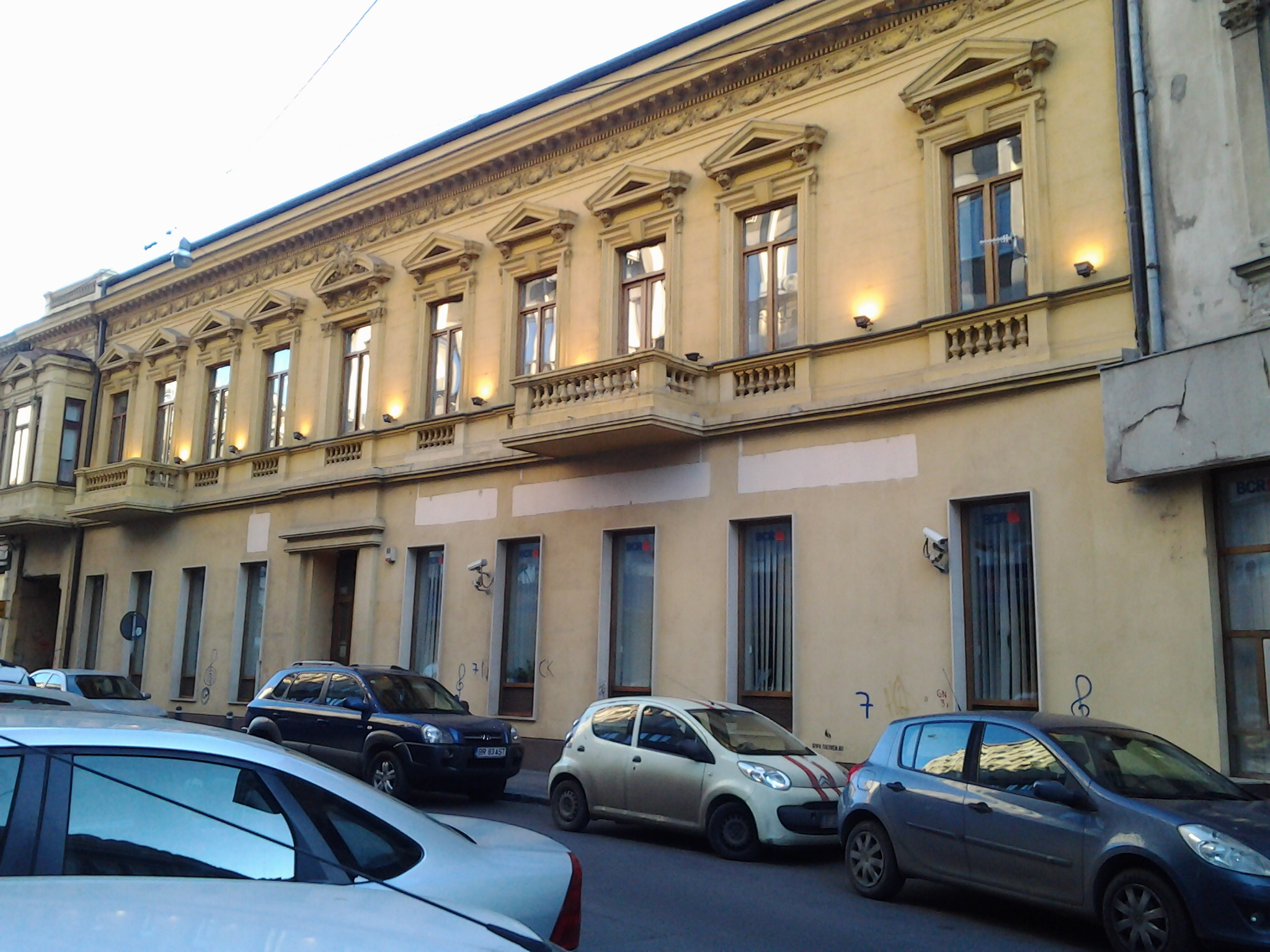
Porsenna's birthplace at Strada Doamnei 14

The future writer, who listed himself as "of Romanian nationality and ethnic origin", was born as Nicu Porsena Ionescu on 13 January 1892. His exact place of birth is Strada Doamnei 14, Lipscani, Bucharest. This was the domicile of his father, the printer Gheorghe (or George) Ionescu, and mother Maria (née Cordea). Nicu's maternal grandfather was a Transylvanian immigrant to Wallachia, who had served as a Barrier Captain in the Bucharest police. The surname "Ionescu" was originally Gheorghe's patronymic, fixated during his time in school; originally from Afumați in Wallachia, he had spent some of his youth as a homeless urchin, owing his success to being selected as an apprentice by C. Petrescu-Conduratu. He was serving as general manager of Institutul de Arte Grafice Carol Göbl, one of Romania's most prestigious presses, and later set up his own firm, Tipografia George Ionescu. The future writer's second birth name, and his selected pen name, was chosen by his father to honor Lars Porsena, the ancient Etruscan king. Gheorghe, who cultivated literature and corresponded with historian Nicolae Iorga, had given unusual, bookish names, to all his children. Three of Nicu's sisters were known as Lucreția, Eugenia, and Gilberta; a brother was baptized Flavius.

Nicu was a student of Matei Basarab National College from 1902. In February 1909, he and classmate Adrian Maniu co-authored and recited a poem that parodied Symbolist cliches. Both of them bonded with another schoolmate, the future journalist and theologian Nae Ionescu, with whom they discussed "important philosophical problems". Porsenna was attending the high school literary club, chaired by folklorist Theodor Speranția, where, in June, he restated his dislike of Symbolism in a public dispute with another colleague, C. Vlădescu. In 1910, when his poems first appeared in print in Viața Socială journal, he had enlisted at the University of Bucharest, ultimately majoring in Philosophy and Law in 1914. During his second year, in August 1912, he formed a student movement in opposition to the mainstream body, receiving pledges of support from young authors such as Maniu, Scarlat Froda, and Theodor Solacolu. It was around this time that Porsenna met Ilie Cătărău, a Bessarabian refugee, university colleague, and future terrorism suspect—seen by Porsenna (his reputed confidant) as a spy for the Romanian Siguranța.

Upon graduation, Porsenna was admitted into the bar association of Ilfov County. His other career was in journalism: On 1 May 1912, his father died, leaving him the family printing press; that year, he also began contributing to Flacăra, with sporadic articles—a collaboration that only ended in 1923. For such pieces, he sometimes used the signatures "Cronicarul Dâmboviței", "N. A.", and "N. Albotă"; pen names he used on other projects include "Ing. N. Florian", "N. G. Ionescu-Negion" (or just "Negion"), "I. N. Miereanu", "M. Rantea", and "Styx". With Sergiu Manolescu, Porsenna published a work of social psychology in French, as Interdépendance des facteurs sociaux ("The Interdependence of Social Factors"). Appearing in 1913 at Tipografia George Ionescu, it was designed as a partial correction of Émile Durkheim's theories, with input from the "opposing system" advanced by Gabriel Tarde, and thus rehabilitated the notion and study of human agency. In March 1914, Noua Revistă Română hosted an article by Porsenna, wherein he outlined Félix Le Dantec's "theory of life".

In late 1913, Porsenna published his debut novellas, as La judecata Zeilor ("A Tribunal of Gods"). The volume was reviewed as an oddity, by Albert Honigman, the columnist at Universul Literar: mixing "chrism, philosophy and pornography", it was designed to "rile up" the reader; the review suggests that Porsenna was partly suited for those who appreciated literary naturalism, but also that each individual piece was in a different style, and with a different artistic perspective. This, Honigman notes, made Porsenna stand out as a major literary talent (despite seeming "young, for only youth may provide one with such vigor, such colors"). Literary scholar Călin Teutișan sees La judecata Zeiilor as a study in metafiction, similar to late-20th-century experiments in Postmodern literature. One story mocks all the world religions, depicting Jesus Christ as the prime critic of Christianity—a discourse that Teutișan sees as anticipating satirical takes by Gore Vidal and José Saramago.

=== World War I ===
In 1914, Porsenna also issued a debut novel and began putting out his own newspaper, Latinul ("The Latin"), accompanied by a magazine, Ghilotina ("The Guillotine"), which appeared from November 1915 to March 1916 with Froda as the editorial secretary. Here, he focused for a while on attacking liberal theorist Eugen Lovinescu, whom he likened to a "barking mutt". Porsenna's work as a raconteur was continued in 1915 by a collection of mainly satirical prose, Dincolo de iubire și de moarte ("Beyond Love and Death"), which evidence the intellectual influence of Anatole France and Oscar Wilde. His 1916 novel, Magdalena, was briefly reviewed in Panait Mușoiu's Revista Ideei as "revelations sketched out with a very lively talent [...] which gentle souls would do well to heed." As clarified in the prologue, it was designed as an experiment in anti-art and unreliable narration, drawing attention to processes of self-mystification—to the lyricism of love imagined when compared to the banality of one's amorous biography.

Porsenna's career was touched by political tension during the first two years of World War I, when Romania maintained neutrality. In his Latinul, he urged for an intervention in support of the Entente Powers, citing Francophilia and pan-Latinism as motivations—his articles were reunited as a propaganda brochure, called Războiul popoarelor ("The War of Peoples"). Alongside Froda, he also produced a verse drama, Vulturul ("The Eagle"), depicting events in the life of Michael the Brave, and thus promoting the Ententist version of Romanian nationalism. Two other political essays came out in 1915 and 1916, respectively: Principiul libertății în evoluția politică a statelor europene ("The Principle of Freedom in the Evolution of European States"), and Heghemonia politică în raport cu dezvoltarea politică a statelor ("Political Hegemony in Relation to the Political Development of States"). In Ghilotina, Porsenna moderated his stance, adopting some ideas from the "Germanophile" faction of the Conservative Party—and more specifically from its leader, Alexandru Marghiloman. He proposed that Romanians should wait out the war, and only join that camp that was most likely to win. In late 1915, he was briefly credited as co-editor of the avant-garde and anti-war magazine Chemarea, whose manager was poet Ion Vinea.

The country joined the Entente following an August 1916 treaty. Upon the declaration of war, Porsenna volunteered for the Romanian Land Forces, and fought throughout the first Romanian Campaign, which saw Bucharest being conquered by the Central Powers. In October 1916, he was in Iași, a cadet of the local artillery school. He and Vinea were serving in the same battery as other men of letters: Alfred Hefter-Hidalgo, Ion Marin Sadoveanu, Ion Sân-Giorgiu, poet Alexandru Rally, and philosopher V. Zaborowski. This group sent its "warm regards" to Mihail Dragomirescu, who had been their university professor. While stationed there, Porsenna also happened to meet the fugitive Cătărău; according to Porsenna, they discussed Cătărău's desperation regarding the Romanians' defeats, and his intention of committing suicide with Porsenna's revolver. Porsenna notes: "I advised him to hurl himself into the Râpa Galbenă [gully], which carried the same chance of success. To my knowledge, he never did." Only published in magazines, Vulturul was picked up by the National Theater Iași in the 1917 season, with Constantin Nottara appearing as Michael.

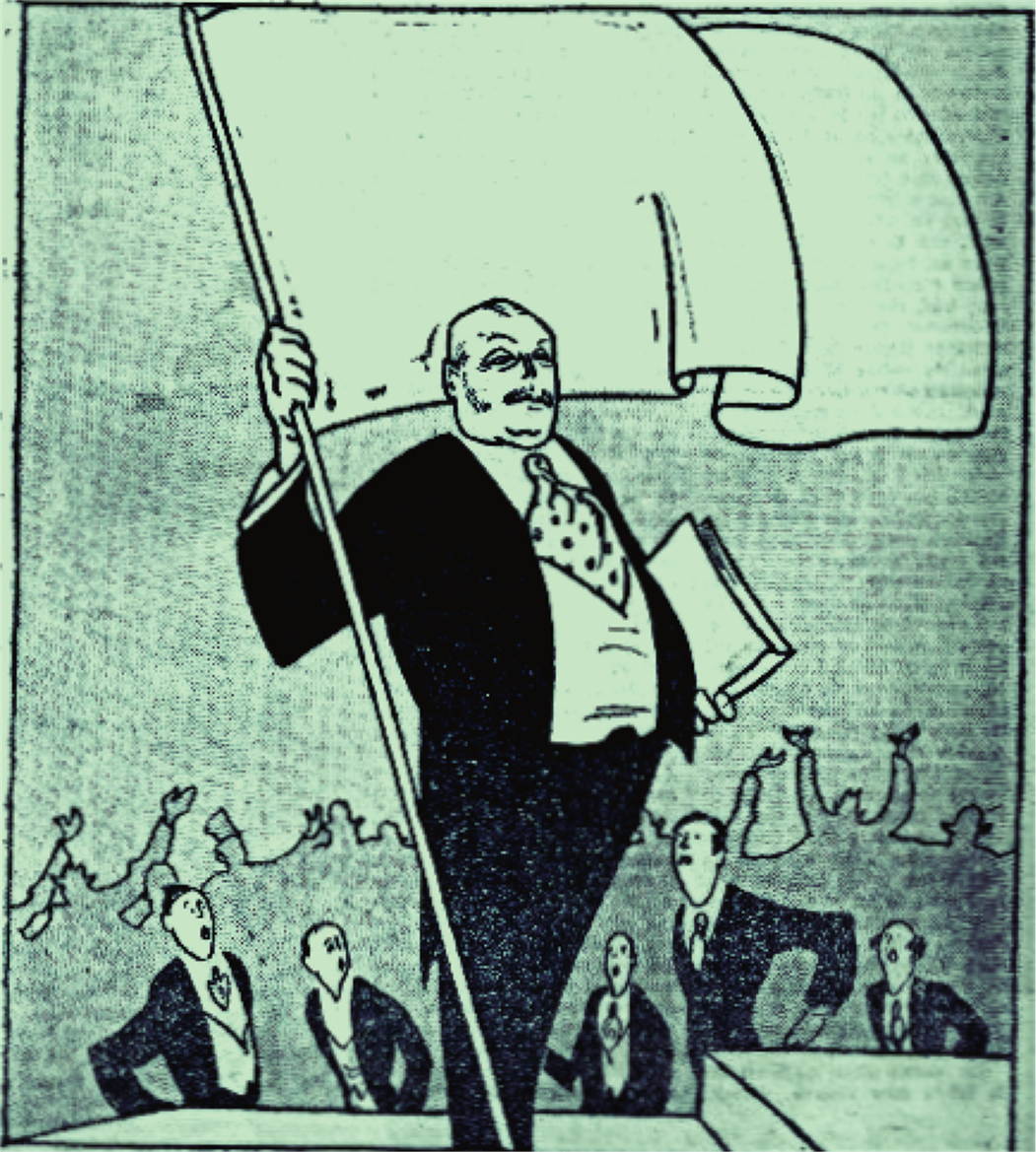
Alexandru Marghiloman as a flag-bearer; June 1918 cartoon in Adrian Maniu's Urzica

Porsenna resumed his career as an editor in March 1918, when Romania was considering capitulating to the Central Powers. His new daily, Arena, had contributions from Vinea, Perpessicius, Demostene Botez, and Pamfil Șeicaru. Literary historian I. Funeriu argues that the person actually in charge of the newspaper was "political con man" Hefter-Hidalgo. Hefter's management ultimately infuriated Vinea, who quit the enterprise. Arena was styled an independent newspaper—but was identified by the rivals at Mișcarea as a mouthpiece for Marghiloman, the new Prime Minister of Romania, and his Conservatives. This view is shared by historian Lucian Boia, who notes that "[Porsenna] was again looking toward Marghiloman, seen by him as a 'new man', tasked with reforming the country at large". As "Ionescu-Porsenna", he ran as a Conservative in the legislative election of May 1918, winning a term in the Assembly of Deputies (for Ilfov's Third College). An anonymous author report for the opposition newspaper Neamul Românesc, published in June, suggests that he spent his allocated speaking time monotonously reading from his own articles in Arena, "produc[ing] deep somnolence in the Chamber." Another one of speeches, held on 23 July, lambasted the Ententist leader, Ion I. C. Brătianu, and scandalized the opposition. Mișcarea claimed that non-Marghilomanists simply left the hall, while also noting that Porsenna's speech was so exceedingly long that the stenographer on duty ran out of paper.

Porsenna ended his military service as a Lieutenant with the 1st Mountain Artillery Division, receiving in 1931 the Order of Michael the Brave. The Marghilomanist episode, which implied a degree of cooperation with the occupying German Army, endured as a topic of controversy. As late as 1937, lawyer and polemicist Traian Dimitriu-Șoimu spoke of Porsenna as a product of "Marghiloman's stables". Porsenna had in fact been dispossessed by the Germans, who dismantled Tipografia George Ionescu, forcing him out of the printing business. The final stages of his mandate as a legislator saw a reversal of fortunes, which began in October 1918, with the Aster Revolution in Austria-Hungary. From the rostrum, he saluted these developments, encouraging the Romanians of Transylvania to seize the opportunity and obtain regional autonomy.

=== Interwar politics ===
In the resulting Greater Romania, which included both Transylvania and Bessarabia, Porsenna was recognized as a professional author: completing two more novels and two collections of stories by 1921, he was head of Gutenberg publishing house from 1920, and a member of the Romanian Writers' Society from 1923. According to a tongue-in-cheek statement by Șeicaru, Arena went under because: "We were all aged 24 and all of us natural-born bosses. This is why we split up in no time, and went on to establish, each in turn, our very own gazettes". Literary historian Paul Cernat notes that Porsenna was founder of the newspaper Naționalul ("The National"); in 1921–1922, he was also Flacăra's co-editor, which implied an association with Brătianu's National Liberal Party. Porsenna was, or was perceived to be, a member of the latter group.

Strigoii ("The Ghosts"), appearing in 1920, was supposed to be Porsenna's first work of "serious" literature, since it tackled the sobering experience of war. It was however panned by an indignant Vinea (whose relationship with Porsenna had grown visibly strained); Vinea suggested that Strigoii could only be called a novel because of its overall size. As Teutișan notes, interwar critics almost always ignored Porsenna, and their indifference was not unjustified: the novels evidenced a "mix of intelligence and naive, braggart attitudes", cultivating sensationalism and interrupting the narrative flow with "wisecracking commentary, sometimes thrown in just for the feel of it." Porsenna was not dissuaded by the poor reception—his younger friend Gheorghe Penciu reports that he showed "exaggerated modesty and shyness" in his private life, being indifferent to public honors while also unrelenting in his polemics with more prestigious literary figures. He continued with a series of political novels and novellas, including Spre fericire ("Toward Happiness") and the Southern Dobrujan-themed Visătorii ("The Dreamers").

In early 1922, Porsenna stirred a national controversy with his Flacăra articles, which deplored the effects of National Liberal governance over Bessarabia. These attacked the relevant ministry, headed by Ion Inculeț, and validated the Bessarabian peasants' disgust with Old-Kingdom Romanians, whom they allegedly perceived as "Gypsies". Government intervened to have the magazine suspended, and Sergiu Manolescu, who was serving as chief editor, stepped down, to be replaced by the more compliant Gala Galaction. In August of that year, Nicu Ionescu's literary name became his legal surname, though spelled as "Porsena". According to a hostile claim by Dimitriu-Șoimu, a ban on changing one's first names resulted in his being legally known as "Nicu Porsena Porsena". He sometimes rendered his chosen name as "Nicolae Porsenna", using the more formal version of "Nicu". In January 1923, while also co-opted as a board member by the local subsidiary of Pirelli, Porsenna married an actress, Dorina Fundulescu. He published a translated version of Războiul popoarelor, as La guerre des peuples. In tandem, Porsenna became passionate about parapsychology and spiritism. In the short story Moartea galbenă ("Yellow Death"), he had described esotericism as the most accomplished development of the human mind, directly above scientific knowledge; in 1927, he published an article on automatic writing. Porsenna also had contributions as an inventor, especially between 1930 and 1944—holding patents to designs for a type of insulated glazing, a sound-to-film technique, a method for putting out oil well fires, and a family car.

In 1928, as a columnist at Rampa daily, Porsenna mocked the left-wing "mysticism" advanced by Leo Tolstoy and the Tolstoyans, as well as by the Narodniks, contending that: "Adoring just one social class is an error, leading one into sectarianism." Porsenna's own political involvement was with the far-right, beginning with the National-Christian Defense League (LANC). In December 1925, when the LANC's A. C. Cuza established a "Bank of National Defense", which "will supply cheap credit only to Christian Romanians", Porsenna signed on as one of the founding members—alongside Sebastian Bornemisa, Ion Zelea Codreanu, Nicolae Paulescu, Valer Pop, and some others. In September 1927, he was elected a member of the LANC's Central Executive Committee, voting to expel former chairman Cuza from his own party.

In early 1935, under contract with Editura Cugetarea, Porsenna issued another collection of stories. Named after the main piece, Se-aprind făcliile, it is primarily noted by Teutișan for a Sherlock Holmes pastiche, in which the titular character is outed as an unintelligent reprobate. The author's claim to a moral high ground, as expressed in that volume, was mocked by diarist-politician Constantin Argetoianu. He alleged that Dorina Porsenna was being pimped out by her husband, who lived on the gifts provided by her wealthy clients (including Ion Boambă, who was Argetoianu's father-in-law). Also in 1935, Nicu Porsenna rallied with a far-right group called Romanian Front (FR), which introduced a Jewish quota, alongside similar restrictions for other minority groups. He praised this policy in an article originally published in Parlamentul Românesc, noting that the FR represented the truest legacy of "Romanianism" and local agrarianism. Political scientist Victor Rizescu notes that the "protection of national labor", a concept introduced by G. Dulca in the spring of 1935, was fully embraced by Porsenna, now a "notorious anti-Semitic publicist"; both wrote for D. R. Ioanițescu's journal, Politica Socială.

Porsenna was included on the Front's list of candidates in the local elections of September 1936 (shared with members of Cuza's National Christian Party). He ran again in the May 1937 election, which saw the FR taking second place at Ilfov; the results were highly controversial, and open to litigation, since it remained unclear how many seats were legally reserved for the electoral minority. The local tribunal ruled on the issue on 2 June, with Porsenna validated as the seventh of fourteen FR county councilors. He was still outraged by the appointment of non-elected members who outweighed the vote, and, by 28 June, was only attending to ask that the council dissolve itself. Porsenna tried to litigate the invalidation of his party colleague, Constantin Dobrișan, who had run despite being a schoolteacher. According to Porsenna, the law allowed high-school teachers to engage in electoral politics, and this permission would also cover Dobrișan; his reading was dismissed as incompetent by Stanciu Stoian, of the rival National Peasantists, who claimed: "Mr N. Porsena is a sophist of the cheapest variety, who likes to hear himself speak".

In the late 1930s, Porsenna also became a sympathizer of the Iron Guard, and a regular contributor to, and editor of, the Guardist paper Ideea Liberă—alongside the likes of Constantin Fântâneru, Radu Gyr, Mihail Polihroniade, and Simion Stolnicu. With this collaboration, he rendered explicit his critique of Nicolae Iorga's Democratic Nationalists, sparking indignation among Iorga's disciples. The resulting polemic, peaking in October 1937, put an end to Porsenna's links with the FR, which clarified that it had no links with Ideea Liberă, and that Iorga was a friend. According to Penciu, Iorga viewed the clash of ideas as a "personal conflict." Regenerarea neamului românesc ("Regeneration of the Romanian People"), appearing at Editura Cugetarea in 1937, was Porsenna's main contribution to a debate on national psychology, seeking to identify "the causes of poverty and underdevelopment". His approach was that of a harsh but loving critic of his own people, especially its peasant class—he pointed to the "primitive life" of villages, but noted that peasants were being taxed so as to provide for an "army of useless clerks"; he demanded that Westernization be accelerated, suggesting that the Romanian intellect was commendable, but undisciplined, and therefore "sterile". The book invited Romanians to maintain "ethnic solidarity", warning that only this could ensure survival against "5 million minority ethnics, of whom 2 million are Jews, who are readied for life in the most formidable way." With this tract, Porsenna also shared his beliefs about the "racial" characteristics of local subgroups. He thus argued that Oltenians were the most detestable among the Romanians, equivalent to Gascons in their supposed penchant for lying and their being "haughty to the point of insanity".

=== Social rise and downfall ===
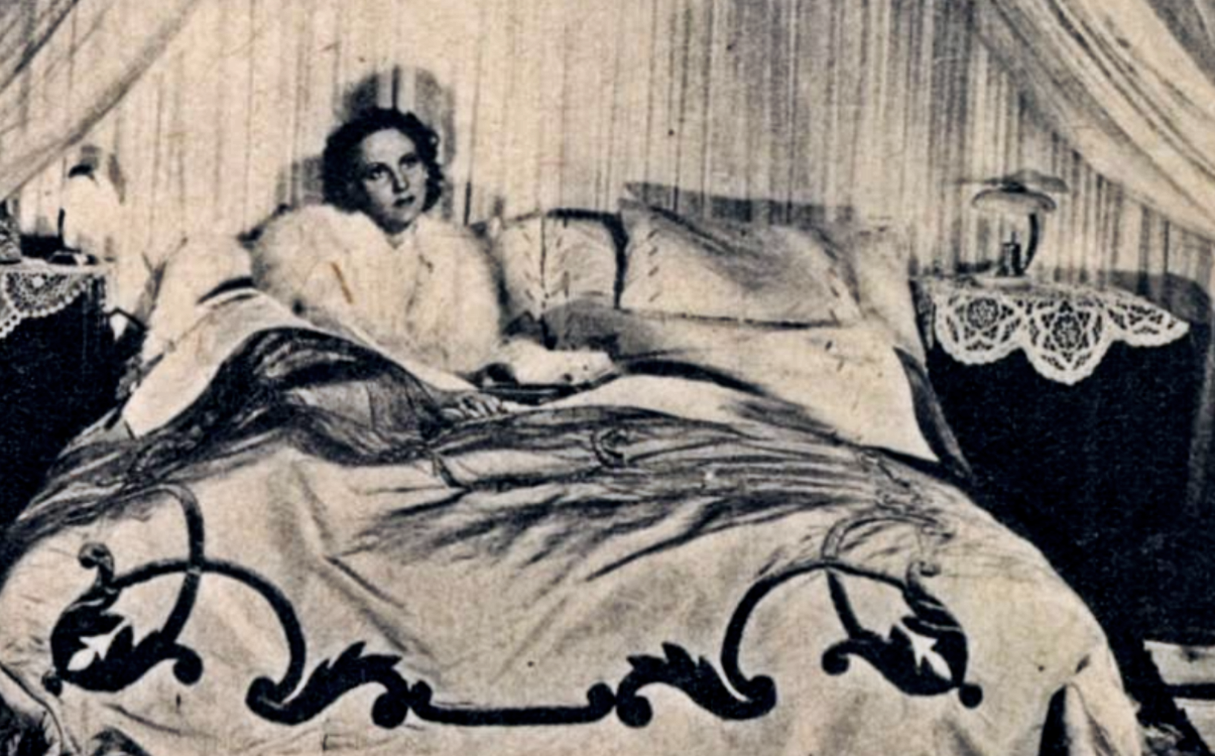
Shooting of a bedroom scene from Se-aprind făcliile, July 1939

Porsenna, who was also co-opted as publisher at Editura Cugetarea, expanded on his theoretician's work with Proporția etnică și primatul muncii românești ("Ethnic Proportionality and the Primacy of Romanian Labor"). Appearing in 1938, it included a formal denunciation of antisemitism, and clarified that its proposals for social reform had nothing in common with the "proletarian beastliness" of communism. The study drew attention in the rival Kingdom of Hungary, with its daring claims about Transylvanian Hungarians and other ethnic minorities. In a 1941 overview for Kisebbségvédelem journal, scholar András Arató noted that Porsenna, a "well-known right-wing writer and political reformer", had proposed the Romanianization of minorities by voluntary means (which implied that non-Romanians wishing to integrate ethnically would have to abide by a set of rules), as well as by more violent ones—such as resettling and dispersing them in rural areas, which could be thus become "wonderful farmlands." Arató declared himself shocked by Porsenna's "determination and cynicism."

The period saw Porsenna returning to his psychic research, with Les hypostases de l'âme humaine ("The States of the Human Soul"), which was preserved as a manuscript by Valère Musatesco. It outlined a substance theory of the soul, seen by him as a doubling of the self. In 1939, Porsenna and Isaia Răcăciuni wrote a screenplay variant of Se-aprind făcliile, but its production was beset by numerous difficulties, with Porsenna spending much of his own fortune (some 3 million lei) on the filming process. It was finally completed, with Ion Șahighian as director, and George Vraca as the lead; Emil Botta and female singer Maria Tănase had minor parts. Described by film historian Călin Stănculescu as a "melodrama from the life of Romania's grand bourgeoisie", it told the story of a young woman "falling prey to a love affair that is as irresistible as it is unbecoming", hinting at the "incongruity between superior intellects and a mundane, regular setting." The Iron Guard's newspaper, Porunca Vremii, panned Se-aprind făcliile as "artificial and offensive", also pointing out that Răcăciuni was a Jew. It is now considered a lost film.

Porsenna's wartime service was recognized by the National Renaissance Front in June 1940, when he was inducted into the Order of the Crown of Romania, as a Knight. This came just as the Greater Romanian project was coming to an end. In July, between the cession of Bessarabia to the Soviet Union and ahead of a Nazi-mediated partition of Transylvania, Porsenna advised the Gigurtu government to prepare Romanians for population exchanges. His main projects for 1941 included a translation (and critical study) of Cicero's biography, originally by Alphonse de Lamartine. In September 1941, at the height of World War II and Ion Antonescu's dictatorship, he was a councilor for the Labor Ministry, in the social welfare directorate (called Luptă și Lumină, "Struggle and Enlightenment"). In this capacity, he instructed factory owners to embrace corporate solidarism, defined as a "collaboration between capital and labor"; he also curated "workers' libraries", which were to be made mandatory in all factories. In January 1942, he donated his own estate, a 900-hectares plot outside Otopeni, for the state to build a "citadel of the workers"; his own residence was recorded as Lascăr Catargiu Boulevard 27, in downtown Bucharest. In early 1943, as a member of Concordia Society, Dorina was networking with the Romanian Red Cross, channeling funds for soldiers fighting the Soviets on the Eastern Front.

Porsenna was additionally employed as editor of Muncitorul Național Român, the Ministry's publication, or "social tribune", and, between 1942 and 1945, served as vice president of Filmul Românesc, the national film-making co-operative. In 1943, he became legal expert at the Superior Council on Transport and Tariffs. With Nichifor Crainic and several other Romanian, German, and Slovak citizens, he established a company, Negocia SAR, which dealt in imports of machinery and consumer goods. He also tried a comeback as a novelist—with the 1943 Rug ("Pyre"). Centered on a rural schoolteacher, it was a seeming praise of hedonism, and in large part a retelling of Spre fericire (disliked by Teutișan for is concessions to the melodramatic genre). As a researcher of the paranormal, he completed the preface to a translation from William Crookes, as well as his own tome, Visul Profetic ("On the Prophetic Dream"), which appeared in 1943. It was commended by psychotherapist Constantin Michăilescu as the best-documented work of its kind to have been published in Romanian. Michăilescu cited the volume for its claim that modern psychology needed input from mediumship, and quoted Porsenna for his typology of mediums. In early 1944, Porsenna was a literary reviewer at Crainic's magazine, Gândirea. Also then, he completed a translation of Oscar Wilde's Ballad of Reading Gaol, praised by contemporary the staff critic at Curentul for being both "beautiful and precise". It was published alongside his version of Edgar Allan Poe's "The Raven".

The Antonescu regime and its alliance with the Axis powers were ended by the palace coup of August 1944. Porsenna was first targeted by a political purge in January 1945, when he was debarred following a report by I. G. Calmanovici. In May, Filmul Românesc stripped him of his membership (alongside Crainic, Horia Igiroșanu, and Dragoș Protopopescu); he had also lost his position at the Labor Ministry. He was still allowed to publish by Editura Cugetarea, curating an edition of esoteric texts by Ernest Walter Oaten in his capacity as founder of the "Romanian Metapsychic Institute". His introduction advanced a reading of the historical Jesus as involved in "top-class mediumship". Dorina divorced him around that time. Porsenna pursued a relationship with his former coworker, his future second wife, Zoe. He proposed to her, but she would not marry him at that stage, since she feared that his status as an undesirable would compromise her own financial independence. In 1946, Porsenna managed to publish another work on he paranormal, as Aparițiuni și fantome materializate ("Materialized Apparitions and Ghosts"). He had joined the Studies Circle of the Democratic Peasants' Party–Lupu, discussing plans for a new electoral law. He was also in contact with the Romanian Society for Friendship with the Soviet Union and its publishing venture, Cartea Rusă. In November 1947, as part of a "Romanian–Soviet Friendship Week", these published Porsenna's translation of Tolstoy's War and Peace, prefaced by Alexandru A. Philippide.

=== Imprisonment and persecution ===
The establishment of a Romanian communist regime in 1948 came with renewed threats. Porsenna hid in Zoe's apartment on Saligny Street, and only went out when she could accompany him; at the time, she had a good reputation as an employee of ICRAL, a state venture overseeing the nationalization of real estate. He was "almost completely cloistered", but also able to focus on his writing. He kept in contact with Ioanițescu's other disciples, including Petre Țuțea—though, as Zoe notes, they never discussed politics. Țuțea was arrested by the Securitate in December 1956, for "crimes of agitation"—meaning his alleged establishment of an anti-communist cell. During the preparatory stages of his trial, prosecutors spuriously noted: "as early as 1948–1949 [Țuțea and his co-defendants] have set up [...] a subversive fascist-Guardist-type organization called 'Nationalist Party', whose leader were the Guardists Ștefan Petre and Porsenna Nicolae (long-time defectors from this country) [sic], their purpose being the violent toppling of our people's democracy and the establishment of a fascist-type regime".

On 26 June 1957, which was Zoe's birthday, the Securitate responded to an anonymous tip (allegedly from Dorina or from a woman picked up during the stake-out); its agents stormed the apartment, arresting both of its tenants. Penciu, who met him later in Aiud Prison, believes that Porsenna was tortured by the Securitate and subjected to "unparalleled humiliation" while in preliminary confinement. He was ultimately sentenced for the crime of "conspiracy against the social order", having been spuriously depicted as the "ideologue" of Țuțea's group. As noted by Zoe, Porsenna's 50-year sentence included three counts: 25 years for conspiracy, 15 for failing to report his stash of bullion, and 10 more for illegally using Zoe's identity papers. She was similarly tried and sentenced for treason, but set free alongside other prisoners during the mass amnesty of 1962–1964. Serving time in Jilava, Văcărești, and finally Aiud, Nicu Porsenna earned the respect of other inmates. One of these was the much younger Vasile Gavrilescu, who spoke of him as a man of "irreproachable dignity". Porsenna's activities in that paperless environment included teaching his cellmates poetry and literary history, from books he had quasi-memorized.

Porsenna was placed under a more liberal regimen in late 1962, by which time he had developed both Parkinson's disease and tuberculosis. Moved into Aiud's 12th section, set aside for those too weak for prison labor, he was allowed access to antibiotics, which stopped progression of tuberculosis; however, as noted by fellow inmate Penciu, his incurable Parkinson's had pushed him into self-isolation, making him reject the friendship of most others (including Valeriu Anania and Sandu Tudor). He was finally released in August 1964, but was prevented from publishing by the ongoing communist censorship, and was probably constantly watched by the Securitate. Though a near-invalid, he persuaded Zoe into marrying him. He dictated his new works to an assistant; according to Penciu, they reveal his embrace of stoicism, and refrain from ever criticizing the communist authorities.

Porsenna could only return to letters as a poetry translator: a large fragment of his rendition from Ovid's Ars Amatoria appeared in Tomis journal, and, under contract with Editura Univers, he could print his final version of Wilde's Ballad, with illustrations by Vasile Kazar. He prefaced it with a study in which he expressed the view that "a good lyrical translation is like a collaboration [with the original author]"; Porsenna himself gladly followed Wilde in his unconventional use of 6- to 10-syllable hemistichs. Porsenna was already hospitalized and dying when the Ballad was under print, telling Zoe that it would "make him famous". He spent his final days at I. C. Frimu Hospital in Floreasca, with the attending doctor preventing his wife from watching over his agony. He died there on 18 January 1971, and was buried in the writers' plot at Bellu Cemetery. The Ballad appeared in shops shortly after—and sold out all copies within hours.

== Legacy ==
Weeks after the burial, anthropologist Victor Săhleanu discussed Romanian contributions to parapsychology, mentioning Porsenna's "intense activity" in that field—and in succession to Bogdan Petriceicu Hasdeu's earlier work. His output as a social psychologist was sampled in Ion Ungureanu's 1989 overview, Idealuri sociale și realități naționale. Here, Porsenna was defined as an evolutionist and positivist thinker, in line with A. D. Xenopol, Spiru Haret, and Henric Sanielevici. Focus on Porsenna's lifelong work was only restored in the 1990s, that is after the anti-communist uprising; in 1995, his rendition of William Shakespeare's Sonnet 29 was included a definitive Shakespeare edition, put out by Leon Levițchi. Five years later, Radio România Cultural hosted readings by Victor Rebengiuc from Porsenna's translations of Poe.

Porsenna's widow led efforts to ensure that his books could undergo critical reappraisal, establishing a foundation named after him. However, as she complained in 2001 (when she was aged 89): "[it] cost me a lot of money, but I never got anywhere with it, because I had no means at my disposal. All around me people have duped me, though I am credited as the sponsor of historically valuable books." Regenerarea reappeared, care of Editura Vremea, in 2001; the following year, Saeculum publishers put out a large corpus of his translations, which featured samples from Lamartine, Poe, Shakespeare, Charles Baudelaire, William Blake, Lord Byron, Catullus, Goethe, Victor Hugo, John Keats, Alfred de Musset, Friedrich Schiller, Paul Verlaine, and François Villon. According to a 2005 report in România Liberă, Zoe Porsenna met difficulty in her effort to recover some of her husband's property, and, during litigation, received physical threats from competing parties. In 2013, she had successfully obtained 5 billion lei as reparations from the Romanian state, and was using it to provide for the Porsenna cultural foundation.
