= List of justice ministers of Romania =

Ministry of Justice
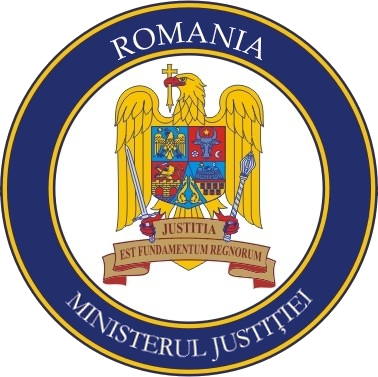
- Coat of arms of the Minister of Justice
- Incumbent; Radu Marinescu since 20 October 2026
- Formation: 1862
- First holder: Manolache Costache Epureanu
- Website: www.just.ro

This is a list of justice ministers of Romania. The first person to hold office was Manolache Costache Epureanu.

== United Romanian Principalities (1859–1862) ==
- Manolache Costache Epureanu - January 17, 1859 (Iași), April 27, 1859 (Iași, Chairman of the Council of Ministers, Minister of Justice and Finance Ad interim)
- Ion Al. Filipescu - January 25, 1859 (Bucharest, President of the Council of Ministers and Minister of Justice)
- Constantin Hurmuzaki - 8 March 1859 (Iași), January 17, 1861 (Iași)
- Ion C. Cantacuzino - 27 March 1859 (Bucharest), 6 September 1859 (Bucharest, and temporary religions), 5 October 1861 (Iași, Minister of Interior and Justice ad-interim), 19 July 1861 (Bucharest)
- Gheorghe Crețeanu - October 6, 1859 (Bucharest, the holder of Ion C. Cantacuzino resigning), October 11, 1859 (Bucharest, ad interim)
- Dimitrie Scarlat Miclescu - November 10, 1859 (Iași)
- Gheorghe Apostoleanu - 30 March 1860 (Iași, ad interim, Dimitrie Scarlat Miclescu resigning)
- Damaschin Bojincă - April 30, 1860 (Iași)
- Vasile Boerescu - May 28, 1860 (Bucharest, July 13, 1860 and Ad-interim at the Cults), November 17, 1868
- Nicolae Bițcoveanu - April 11, 1861 (Bucharest ad interim following the resignation of Vasile Boerescu)
- Constantin Hurmuzaki - January 17, 1861 (Iași)
- Constantin Rolla - May 23, 1861 (Iași) (replacing Constantin Hurmuzachi, resigned)
- Constantin N. Brăiloiu - April 30, 1861 (Bucharest), January 22, 1862
- Grigore Arghiropol - May 12, 1861 (Bucharest)
- Dimitrie Ghica - July 30, 1861 (ad interim as missing Ion C. Cantacuzino), January 21, 1870 (interim in place of Vasile Boerescu, resigned)

== Romania (1862–1881) ==
- Apostol Arsache - October 21, 1861 (ad interim following the resignation of IC Cantacuzino)
- Dimitrie Cornea - June 7, 1862
- Nicolae Kretzulescu - December 30, 1862, July 3, 1862, August 8, 1863 (28 days in advance and August after the resignation of Barbu Bellu), June 19, 1864, March 11, 1871
- Barbu Bellu - June 14, 1863
- Dimitrie P. Vioreanu - August 15, 1863, February 2, 1870, April 5, 1876
- Alexandru Papiu Ilarian - October 11, 1863
- P. Orbescu - 1 March 1864 (ad interim), 6 May 1864
- Grigore Bengescu - January 21, 1865
- George D. Vernescu - January 26, 1865
- Dimitrie Cariagdi - June 14, 1865, December 18, 1870
- Ioan Cantacuzino - February 11, 1866
- Constantin A. Kretzulescu - March 1, 1867
- Ștefan Golescu - August 5, 1867 (ad interim)
- Anton I. Arion - August 17, 1867, November 13, 1867
- Constantin Eraclide - November 3, 1868
- Gheorghe Grigore Cantacuzino - January 24, 1870
- Alexandru Lahovary - April 20, 1870, October 4, 1873
- Gheorghe Costaforu - June 8, 1871
- Manolache Costache Epureanu - October 28, 1872
- Christian Tell - March 31, 1873 (ad interim)
- Mihail Pherekyde - April 27, 1876, April 9, 1871
- Eugeniu Stătescu - 24 July 1876, 16 November 1881 (ad interim), 1 August 1882, 16 December 1885, 4 October 1895, 8 July 1902
- Ion I. Câmpineanu - January 27, 1877
- Anastase Stolojan - July 11, 1879, January 5, 1898

== Kingdom of Romania (1881–1947) ==
- Dimitrie Gianni - July 9, 1880, March 1, 1888
- Gheorghe Chițu - January 25, 1882, October 1, 1883 (ad interim)
- Nicolae Voinov - November 15, 1883
- Constantin Nacu - February 2, 1885
- Alexandru Marghiloman - March 23, 1888
- George D. Vernescu - November 12, 1888, February 21, 1891 (ad interim)
- Nicolae Gherassi - March 29, 1889
- Theodor Rosetti - November 5, 1889
- Grigore Trandafil - November 16, 1890
- Nicolae Blaremberg - November 3, 1891
- Dimitrie C. Sturdza-Scheianu - November 27, 1891
- Ștefan C. Șendrea - November 22, 1896
- Alexandru Djuvara - March 31, 1897
- George D. Pallade - January 12, 1898
- Constantin Stoicescu - October 1, 1898, February 14, 1901
- Constantin Dissescu - April 11, 1899
- Titu Maiorescu - July 7, 1900
- Alexandru Gianni - October 19, 1903
- Alexandru Bădărău - December 22, 1904
- Dimitrie Grecianu - June 5, 1906
- Toma Stelian - March 12, 1907
- Mihail G. Cantacuzino - December 29, 1910, December 11, 1916
- Victor Antonescu - January 4, 1914, November 14, 1933, January 5, 1934, October 2, 1934
- Constantin Argetoianu - January 29, 1918, March 13, 1920 (ad interim)
- Dimitrie Dobrescu - March 16, 1918
- Ion Mitilineu - June 4, 1918
- Artur Văitoianu - October 24, 1918 (Ad-interim, Army Corps General)
- Dumitru Buzdugan - October 28, 1918
- Em. Miclescu - September 27, 1919
- Ion Pelivan - December 5, 1919 (did not work, being delegated to the Peace Commission in Paris, the interim was held by Ștefan Cicio Pop, State Minister)
- Matei B. Cantacuzino - March 31, 1920
- Dimitrie Grecianu - August 27, 1920 (ad interim), November 16, 1920
- Take Ionescu - December 9, 1920 (ad interim)
- Mihail Antonescu - January 1, 1921
- Stelian Popescu - December 17, 1921, June 4, 1927
- Ioan Theodor Florescu - January 19, 1922
- Gheorghe Gh. Mârzescu - October 29, 1923
- Teodor Cudalbu - March 30, 1926
- Grigore Iunian - November 10, 1928, June 13, 1930, October 10, 1930
- Voicu Nițescu - 7 March 1930, 7 June 1930, 6 December 1930
- Gheorghe Mironescu - June 7, 1930 (ad interim)
- Constantin Hamangiu - April 18, 1931
- Victor Vâlcovici - January 7, 1932
- Valer Pop - January 9, 1932, February 1, 1935
- Virgil Potârcă - June 6, 1932
- Mihai Popovici - August 11, 1932, October 20, 1932, January 14, 1933, September 22, 1933
- Emil Hațieganu - July 22, 1933 (ad interim)
- Mircea Djuvara - August 29, 1936
- Vasile P. Sassu - February 23, 1937
- Vasile Rădulescu Mehedinți - December 29, 1937
- Mircea Cancicov - February 11, 1938 (ad interim)
- Victor Iamandi - March 30, 1938
- Istrate Micescu - November 24, 1939
- Aurelian Bentoiu - November 30, 1939
- Ion V. Gruia - July 4, 1940
- Mihai Antonescu - September 14, 1940
- Gheorghe Popescu-Docan - January 27, 1941
- Constantin Stoicescu - February 15, 1941
- Ion C. Marinescu - August 14, 1942
- Lucrețiu Pătrășcanu - August 23, 1944 (ad interim), November 4, 1944
- Ion Boițeanu - 1 September 1944 (ad interim)
- Aureliu Căpățână - September 7, 1944 (replacing Lucrețiu Pătrășcanu, resigned)
- Dimitrie Negel - October 4, 1944 (ad interim, Aureliu Căpățână resigning)

== Communist Romania (1948–1989) ==
- Avram Bunaciu - April 15, 1948, December 31, 1957
- Stelian Nițulescu - September 24, 1949
- Anton Tatu Jianu - January 28, 1953
- Gheorghe Diaconescu - May 31, 1954, January 23, 1958
- Ion Constantin Manoliu - March 21, 1961
- Adrian Dimitriu - March 18, 1965
- Teodor Vasiliu - November 28, 1970
- Emil Nicolcioiu - March 18, 1975
- Constantin Stătescu - January 26, 1977
- Justin Grigoraș - October 24, 1979
- Ioan Ceterchi - March 29, 1980
- Gheorghe Chivulescu - January 23, 1982
- Maria Bobu - October 3, 1987

== Post-Communist Romania (1989–present) ==
- Teofil Pop - January 3, 1990
- Victor Babiuc - June 28, 1990
- Mircea Ionescu-Quintus - October 16, 1991
- Petre Ninosu - November 19, 1992
- Iosif Gavril Chiuzbaian - March 6, 1994
- Ion Predescu - September 3, 1996
- Valeriu Stoica 12 December 1996 – 28 December 2000
- Rodica Stănoiu 28 December 2000 – 10 March 2004
- Cristian Diaconescu 10 March 2004 – 28 December 2004
- Monica Macovei 18 December 2004 – 5 April 2007
- Tudor Chiuariu 5 April 2007 – 10 December 2007
- Teodor Meleșcanu (ad interim) 15 January 2008 – 29 February 2008
- Cătălin Predoiu 29 February 2008 – 7 May 2012
- Titus Corlățean 7 May 2012 – 6 August 2012
- Mona Pivniceru 23 August 2012 – 28 March 2013
- Victor Ponta (acting) 28 March 2013 – 15 April 2013
- Robert Cazanciuc 15 April 2013 – 17 November 2015
- Raluca Prună 17 November 2015 – 4 January 2017
- Florin Iordache 4 January 2017 – 9 February 2017
- Ana Birchall (acting) 9 February 2017 – 22 February 2017
- Tudorel Toader 23 February 2017 - 18 April 2019
- Ana Birchall 7 June 2019 - 4 November 2019
- Cătălin Predoiu 4 November 2019 - 23 December 2020
- Stelian Ion 23 December 2020 - 2 September 2021
- Lucian Bode (acting) 2 September 2021 - 25 November 2021
- Cătălin Predoiu 25 November 2021 - 15 June 2023
- Alina Gorghiu 15 June 2023 - 23 December 2024
- Radu Marinescu 23 December 2024 - 25 April 2026
- Cătălin Predoiu (acting) 25 April 2026 - 20 October 2026
- Radu Marinescu 20 October 2026 - present

== See also ==
- Government of Romania
- Justice ministry
- Politics of Romania
- Romanian judicial reform
