= David Popescu =

Romanian general

- Born: 25 May 1886; Comarnic, Prahova County, Kingdom of Romania
- Died: 11 April 1955 (aged 68); Bucharest, Romanian People's Republic
- Education: Infantry and Cavalry Military School; Military Academy of Turin

Minister of Internal Affairs
- In office 4 July 1940 – 4 September 1940
- Prime Minister: Ion Gigurtu
- Preceded by: Mihail Ghelmegeanu
- Succeeded by: himself
- In office 4 September 1940 – 14 September 1940
- Prime Minister: Ion Antonescu
- Preceded by: himself
- Succeeded by: Constantin Petrovicescu
- Military career
- Allegiance: Kingdom of Romania
- Branch: Army
- Service years: 1905–1944
- Rank: Lieutenant general
- Commands: 11th Infantry Division
- Conflicts: Second Balkan War; World War I World War II
- Awards: Order of the Crown (Romania); Order of the Crown of Italy; Order of the Star of Romania

David Popescu (25 May 1886 – 11 April 1955) was a Romanian general during World War II and Interior Minister in 1940.

== Biography ==
He was born in 1886 in Comarnic, Prahova County, Kingdom of Romania, the son of Iulian (a priest) and Maria. He attended primary school in his hometown, and then went to the Sfinții Petru și Pavel High School in Ploiești. He started military service in 1905, advancing to sergeant by 1906. After attending the Military School for Infantry and Cavalry Officers, he graduated in 1908 with the rank of second lieutenant; after further studies at the Special Infantry School, he was promoted to captain in 1912. In 1913 he fought with the 7th Regiment Vânători in the Second Balkan War. Once Romania entered World War I on the side of the Allies in August 1916, Popescu fought in Dobruja as a battalion commander of the 40th Infantry Regiment. He was wounded in action and sent to a hospital in Iași for treatment. Promoted to major in 1917, he spent the rest of the war instructing cadets in Iași and Botoșani.

From 1921 to 1922, Popescu attended the Military Academy of Turin. After advancing in rank to lieutenant colonel in 1925, Popescu served as instructor at the Higher War School, and then as military attaché in Rome from 1928 to 1930. During that period he was awarded the Order of the Crown (Romania), Knight rank and the Order of the Crown of Italy, Officer rank. He was promoted to colonel in 1930, and brigadier general in 1938. He commanded the Guards Brigade from 1937 to 1939, after which he became the Deputy Chief of the General Staff and served as director of the National Military Circle, February–March 1939.

Popescu served as the Minister of Internal Affairs in the Gigurtu cabinet from July 4 to September 4, 1940, and in the First Antonescu cabinet from September 4 to September 14, 1940. In early July he helped manage the flow of refugees from Bessarabia and Northern Bukovina in the wake of the Soviet annexation of those Romanian territories. On August 30, Popescu participated in a meeting of King Carol II's Crown Council, where he was (alongside Gheorghe Mihail, Nicolae Păiș, and Ernest Ballif) one of the four out of five military representatives who recommended accepting the provisions of the Second Vienna Award, by which Romania were to cede Northern Transylvania to Hungary.

On January 10, 1941, he was named commanding officer of the 11th Infantry Division of the Romanian Armed Forces. On May 9, 1941, he was awarded the Order of the Star of Romania, Commander rank. Romania joined Operation Barbarossa on 22 June 1941 in order to reclaim the lost territories of Bessarabia and Northern Bukovina. Popescu fought with his division in Southern Bessarabia and at the Siege of Odessa. On August 20 he was removed from the command of the division, and on August 31 he was dismissed and put into the reserves. After King Michael's Coup of August 23, 1944, he was rehabilitated and promoted, first to divisional general and then to army corps general.

In 1946, Popescu was investigated by the Bucharest People's Tribunal in connection with Ion Antonescu's trial, but he was not arrested. After being denounced in 1950 as a "deadly enemy of communism", he was arrested and imprisoned at Jilava Prison. He was released on July 4, 1953, and acquitted of all charges. He died in Bucharest in 1955.
