= Aiud Prison =

Romanian prison complex

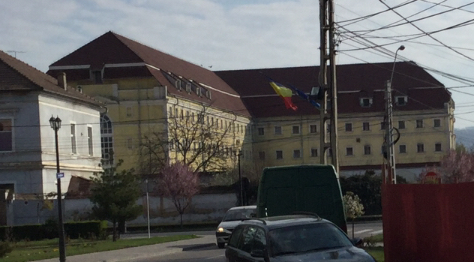
- Interactive map of Aiud Prison
- Location: Aiud, Alba County, Romania; 46°18′48.5″N 23°43′38.14″E
- Opened: 19th century
- Managed by: Administrația Națională a Penitenciarelor
- Director: Adrian Dorel Popa
- Website: anp.gov.ro/penitenciarul-aiud

Aiud Prison is a prison complex in Aiud, Alba County, located in central Transylvania, Romania. It is infamous for the treatment of its political inmates, especially during World War II under the rule of Ion Antonescu, and later under the Communist regime.

== History ==
=== Early days ===
The first mention of the structure dates from 1786. From 1839 to 1849 it served as prison next to the Aiud court of law. After being devastated by fire in January 1849, a new prison was built in 1857, and completed in 1860. An isolation unit, named Zarca (from the Hungarian zárka, meaning solitary), was added in 1881–1882. Finally, between 1889 and 1892, a T-shaped unit with 312 individual cells was erected. Gheorghe Șincai was a prisoner at Aiud in 1794–1795.

=== The interwar and World War II ===
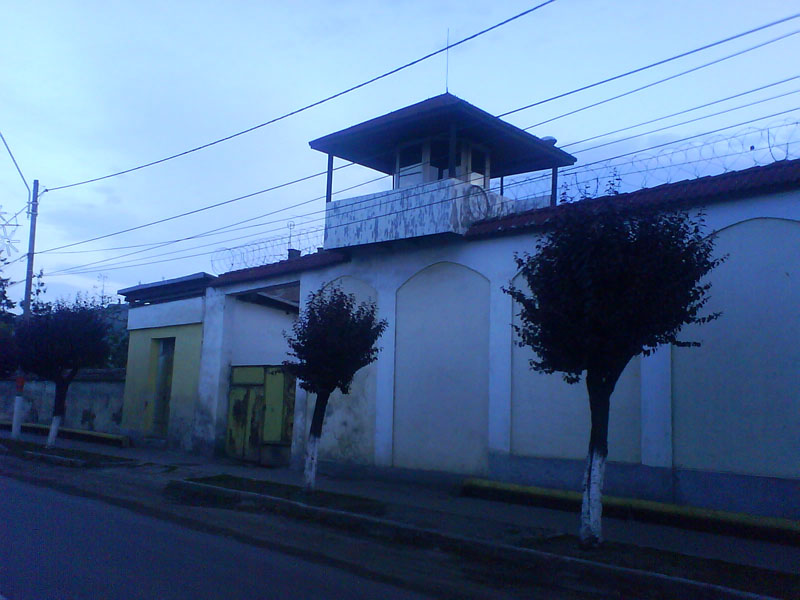
Watchtower at Aiud Prison

During the period 1926–1943, some 143 Communist activists were imprisoned at Aiud peninteciary. Moreover, after the defeat of the Legionnaires' rebellion in 1941, Iron Guard members were also detained there. The largest number of political prisoners held at Aiud during the war occurred at the end of 1944, when 851 inmates had been found guilty of political crimes and 6 were suspected of having committed such offenses.

=== The Communist era ===
Together with the prisons at Sighet, Gherla, and Râmnicu Sărat, the Aiud penitentiary was the most important and the harshest place of detention for political prisoners in Communist Romania. Political prisoners were detained at this facility from 1945 all the way up to the Romanian Revolution of 1989. In 1945 there were only 164 inmates left at Aiud; by the end of 1946 there were 345 inmates condemned of political crimes and 93 accused of such crimes. Those numbers increased in 1947 to 256 and 346, and in 1948 to 889 and 1,269, respectively. Overall, in the first 4 years after the war, authorities incarcerated at Aiud Prison 2,405 condemned individuals and 1,683 indicted individuals.

From October 1948 to November 1949, more than 4,000 political prisoners were brought to Aiud Prison, while in the early 1950s the annual rate was above 2,000. According to a study done by the International Centre for Studies into Communism, 16.2% of all political prisoners in Communist Romania did some time at Aiud. From 1945 to 1965 there were 563 deaths registered at the prison, peaking in 1947, 1950, and 1961 at 110, 81, and 49, respectively. These deaths were mostly due to typhus, cold weather, lack of medical care, malnutrition, and solitary detention at the Zarca. The total number of prisoner deaths at Aiud from 1945 to 1989 has been put at 782.

A CIA report from January 1954 observes: "Aiud Prison is one of the largest and harshest in Rumania. No letters or packages from home are allowed political prisoners, except that they are occasionally allowed to write home for winter clothing. [...] Punishment consists of confinement in the "reserve," a box almost without air; forced labor; or labor on the famous Danube–Black Sea Canal." In his memoirs, Give us each day our daily prison, Ion Ioanid recounts the 12 years he spent in the prisons and labor camps of Communist Romania. He notes that Aiud's isolation from the outside world was the most severe, and states: "Its reputation was well established. The prison of all prisons. It became a symbol. The Holy of Holies."

In 1951, two of the detainees, Mircea Vulcănescu and Nicolae Mărgineanu, planned a mass escape of the prisoners, so that, once they were free, they would contact the anti-communist resistance in the mountains. However, not all the detainees agreed, and in late December, only three of them—aviators Tudor Greceanu and Gheorghe Spulbatu and journalist Valeriu Șirianu—managed to escape; caught soon after, the latter two were subsequently executed.

From 1945 to 1948, the director of Aiud Prison was Alexandru Guțan; during his tenure, the first re-education program in Communist Romania took place there. According to his testimony (available in the archives of the National Council for the Study of the Securitate Archives), "work of political diversion that would lead to discord and crushing one another" was necessary. While Ștefan Koller was the prison's commandant, from 1953 to 1958, the conditions were extremely harsh, and over 100 detainees died. Most deaths at Aiud occurred from 1958 to 1964, when the notorious Securitate Colonel Gheorghe Crăciun was in charge.

=== Current use ===
The prison is in service today as a "Maximum Security Penitentiary"; as of February 2022, there are 737 detainees at Aiud. In 2017, a hall in the penitentiary was dedicated to the memory of one of the political prisoners from the communist period, Petre Țuțea; the hall is a space intended for educational and psychosocial assistance activities in support of current inmates.

== Directors ==
The directors of Aiud Prison during the communist era were as follows:

- Major Alexandru Guțan, 1945–1948
- Major Alexandru Farcaș, 1948–1950
- Captain Nicolae Dorobanțu, 1950–1953
- Colonel Ștefan Koller, 1953–1958
- Colonel Gheorghe Crăciun, November 1958–December 31, 1964
- Colonel Iorgu Volcescu, 1965–1973
- Colonel Traian Moldovan, 1973–1978
- Lt. Colonel Mihai Damian, 1978–1981
- Colonel Vasile Rus, December 1, 1981–April 1, 1987
- Colonel Vasile Țârtan, April 1, 1987–April 26, 1991

== Notable inmates ==
This is a partial list of notable inmates of Aiud Prison; the symbol † indicates those who died there.

- Horia Agarici
- Wolf von Aichelburg
- Aurel Aldea†
- Bartolomeu Anania
- Constantin Anghelache
- Ioan Arbore
- Emil Bodnăraș
- Szilárd Bogdánffy†
- Ilie Borz†
- Sorin Bottez
- Traian Brăileanu†
- Harry Brauner
- Radu Budișteanu
- Constantin Bușilă†
- Emil Calmanovici†
- Corneliu Calotescu
- George Matei Cantacuzino
- Ion Caraion
- Ion Cârja
- Ștefan Cârjan
- Ioan Carlaonț†
- Radu Cioculescu†
- Radu Ciuceanu
- Alexandru Claudian
- Vladimir Constantinescu
- Dumitru Coroamă
- Nichifor Crainic
- Gheorghe A. Cuza†
- Sergiu Dan
- Ion Diaconescu
- Ilariu Dobridor
- Ioan Dumitrache
- Constantin Eftimiu†
- Gheorghe Eminescu
- Ilarion Felea†
- Radu Filipescu
- Gheorghe Flondor
- Valeriu Gafencu
- Constantin Gane†
- Toma Ghițulescu
- Victor Gomoiu
- Tudor Greceanu
- Radu Gyr
- Pan Halippa
- Traian Herseni
- Iosif Iacobici†
- Ion Ioanid
- Modest Isopescu†
- George Ivașcu
- Gheorghe Koslinski†
- Radu Lecca
- Vasile Luca†
- Horia Macellariu
- Nicolae Macici†
- Gheorghe Manoliu
- Gheorghe Manu†
- Socrat Mardari†
- Nicolae Mărgineanu
- Ion Marian†
- Ion C. Marinescu†
- Istrate Micescu†
- Alexandru Mironescu
- Radu Mironovici
- Ioan Mocsony-Stârcea
- Gabriel Negrei†
- Petru Nemoianu†
- Gheron Netta†
- Constantin Nicolescu
- Alexandru Nicolschi
- Vasile Noveanu
- Gavril Olteanu†
- Nicolae Păiș
- Gherman Pântea
- Arsenie Papacioc
- Iustin Pârvu
- I. Peltz
- Constantin Petrovicescu†
- Ion Petrovici
- N. Porsenna
- Ion Sichitiu†
- Gheorghe Șincai
- Virgil Solomon
- Gheorghe Spulbatu†
- Dumitru Stăniloae
- Gheorghe Stavrescu†
- Nicolae Steinhardt
- Boris Stefanov
- Paul Sterian
- Păstorel Teodoreanu
- Constant Tonegaru
- Ioan Topor†
- Constantin Trestioreanu
- Sandu Tudor†
- Petre Țuțea
- Ștefana Velisar Teodoreanu
- Mircea Vulcănescu†
- Vintilă Weiss

== Cultural representations ==
In his poem Blestemul Aiudului ("Aiud's Curse"), Radu Gyr evokes the harsh conditions prisoners endured there in the 1950s.

Aiudule, Aiudule,
temniță cruntă,
fă-te, zăludule,
piatră măruntă.

Focul mănâce-te,
că nu te saturi.
Mereu vrei scâncete
și bei oftaturi

Translation:

Aiud, Aiud,
you horrible blunder,
please be so good
as to crumble asunder.

Flow down into gravel,
Burn into ashes.
May that stop your feasting
on anguish and gnashes.
