= Râmnicu Sărat Prison =

Prison located in Râmnicu Sărat, Buzău County, Romania

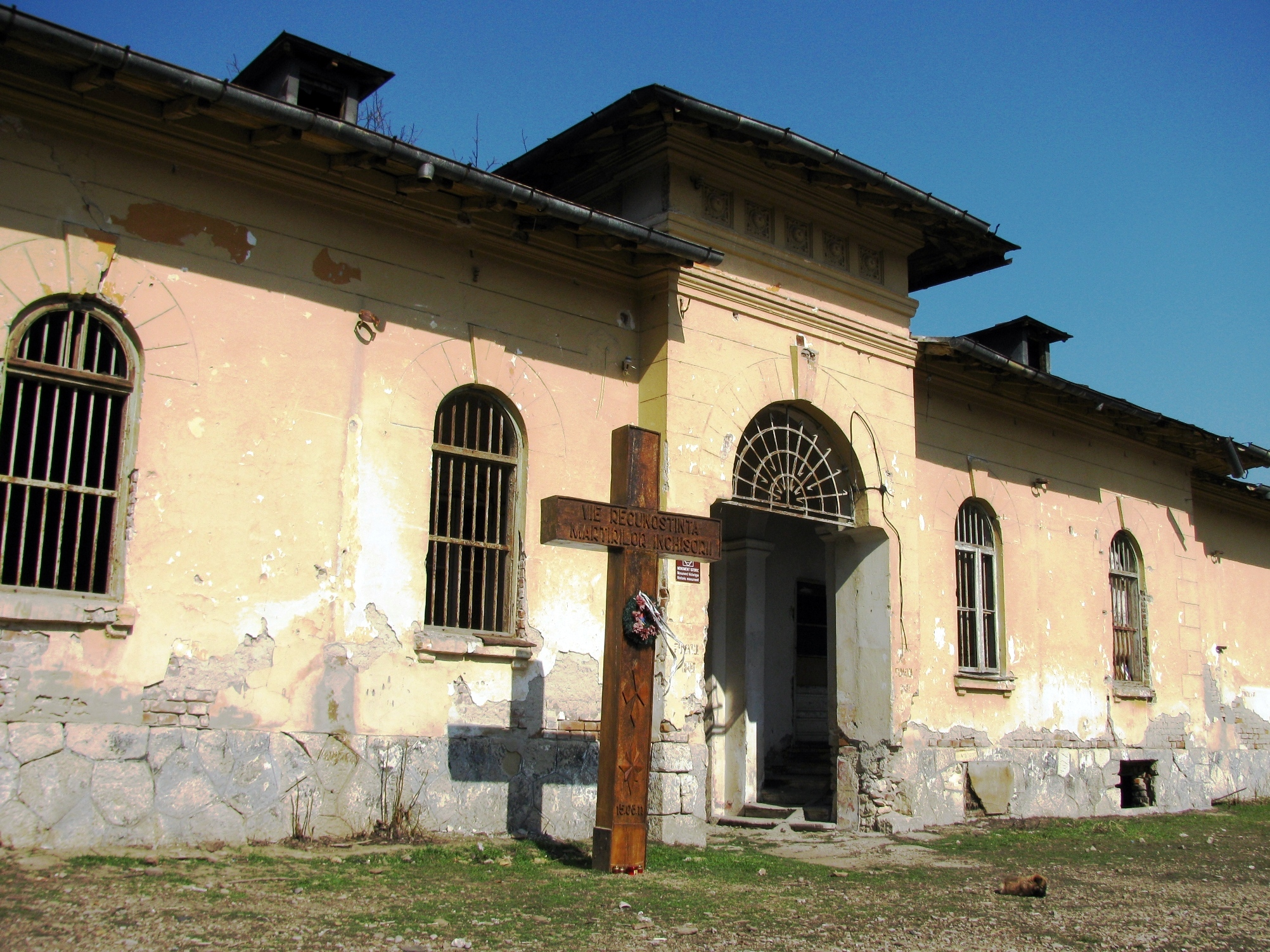
- Entrance to the former prison
- Interactive map of Râmnicu Sărat Prison
- Location: Râmnicu Sărat, Buzău County, Romania; 45°23′00″N 27°03′19″E
- Status: Closed, listed as historic monument
- Capacity: 300
- Population: Political prisoners (1938-1940, 1947-1963); Common criminals (to 1941, 1944-1963); Military prisoners (1941-1944)
- Opened: End of the 19th century
- Closed: 1963
- Warden: Alexandru Vișinescu (1956–1963)

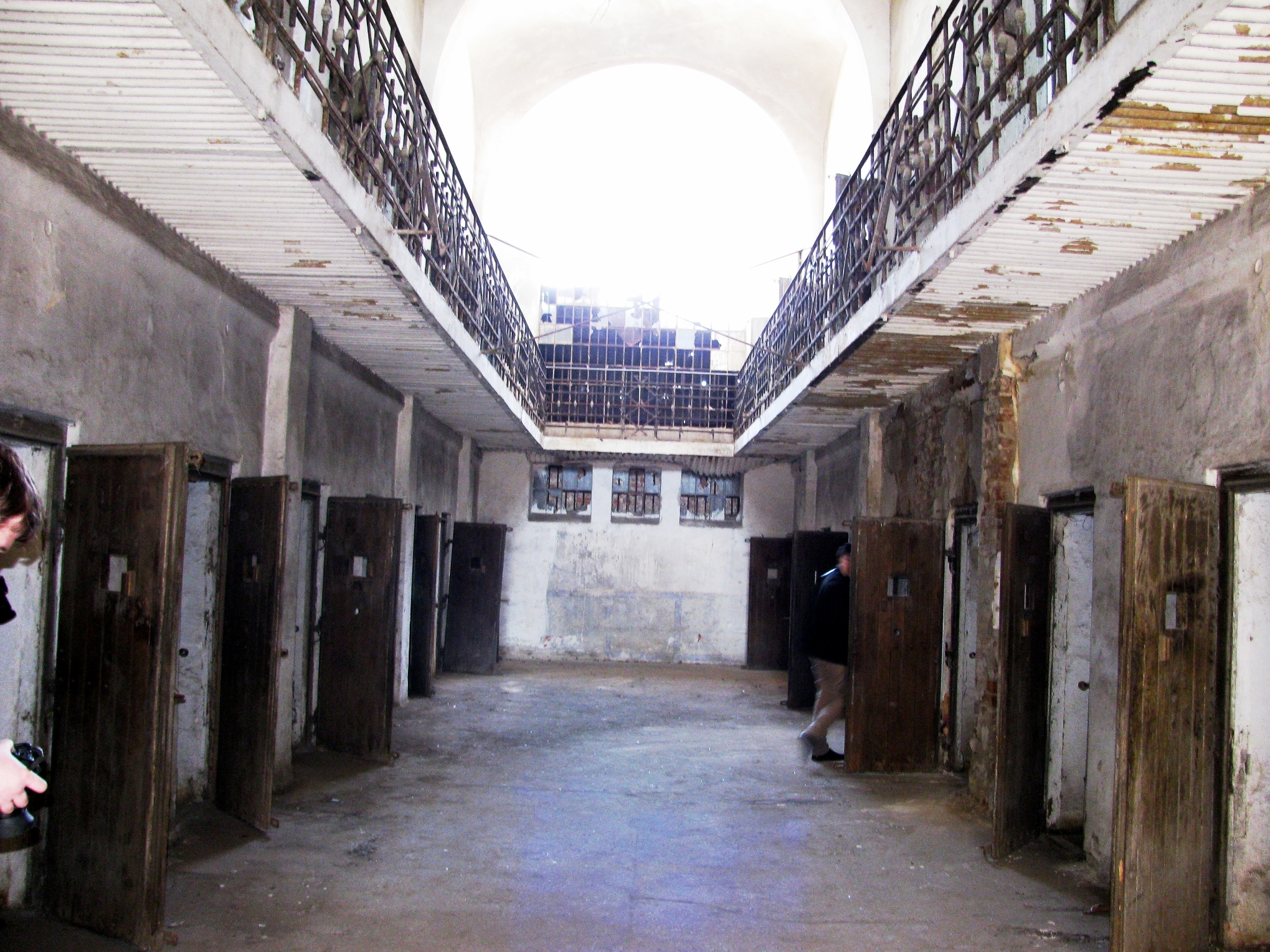
Interior of the prison

Râmnicu Sărat Prison is a former prison located in Râmnicu Sărat, Buzău County, Romania. The building is listed as a historic monument by Romania's Ministry of Culture and Religious Affairs.

== Before World War II ==
The prison is located in the southern part of the city, close to the railway station. It was built in the late 19th century following the Auburn system. Its existence was first attested in October 1901, when King Carol I visited the inmates in their cells, pardoning three of them. It had a ground and an upper floor with 35 small cells fitting up to four prisoners each, and six large rooms with a maximum capacity of 130. The cells and the rooms were in separate wings. In the cell wing, the ground floor had sixteen and the upper floor also sixteen, on both sides; in addition, three smaller one-man cells were located on the left side of the upper floor. From the time of its establishment until 1938, the prison held common criminals with sentences of six months to two years. In 1907, peasants arrested during the revolt were taken there for short periods.

In 1938, it received Iron Guard members as political prisoners, including the movement’s leader, Corneliu Zelea Codreanu. In late November, he and thirteen other cadres, the Nicadori and Decemviri death squads, were ordered transferred to Jilava, but strangled on the way, in Tâncăbești. In September 1939, a further thirteen Guardists incarcerated at Râmnicu Sărat were killed in reprisal for the assassination of Armand Călinescu. It was a military prison during World War II, holding soldiers charged with various offenses, such as desertion, failure to enroll or cowardice. In June 1944, there were 63 military prisoners. Examples of their rations include meat and potato soup, bean soup, cabbage with tomatoes and mămăligă. After the August 1944 coup, the prison reverted to holding common criminals.

== During the communist period ==
Political prisoners were held at the prison from 1947 to 1963, in the individual cells, while common criminals inhabited the large rooms. The two groups were kept completely separate and forbidden from communicating. From 1947 to 1952, the number of prisoners varied between 80 and 200, with common criminals forming the majority. The first political prisoners, who arrived in the second half of 1947, were “saboteurs”: peasants who were unable to hand over quotas of livestock and grain, as well as members of non-communist parties from Râmnicu Sărat County. Starting in 1949, opponents of collectivization and of the nascent communist regime joined the ranks. In 1948-1949, an effort at “re-education” involved lecturing prisoners about the achievements of the Petru Groza government and the benefits of “people’s democracy”, reading progressive brochures together and leaving Marxist books in their cells. Until 1952, it was a transit prison, holding detainees for several months until they were moved to other prisons or to the Danube–Black Sea Canal. After the end of the experiment in “re-education” at Pitești Prison, part of the torturers were brought to Râmnicu Sărat for interrogation. Until 1955, most of the political prisoners there were Iron Guard members, among them Nicolae Petrașcu. That year, the surviving defendants tried alongside Iuliu Maniu arrived: National Peasants' Party (PNȚ) affiliates Ion Mihalache, Ilie Lazăr, and Victor Rădulescu-Pogoneanu. In 1957, in the aftermath of a hunger strike at Aiud Prison, the strike leaders, among them Ion Diaconescu, were sent to Râmnicu Sărat, followed by more political prisoners: Corneliu Coposu, Alexandru Alexandrini, Alexandru Constant, Constantin Pantazi, Ion Petrovici, Petre Tomescu, and Gheorghe Jienescu.

The majority of survivors agree that food rations were at hunger and extermination levels, never exceeding 500-600 calories per day. A common criminal would leave rations at the cell door: typically, cornflour gruel in the morning, boiled vegetables with bits of gristle for lunch and a thin soup in the evening. Prisoners awoke at five in the morning and the lights were turned off at ten in the evening. During this time, they were not allowed to stay in bed, but had to stand or sit on a chair facing the cell door. Approaching the window, communicating with other prisoners or making noise were forbidden. Visits by personnel had to be in pairs, to prevent any discussion. Violations were punished by removing the mattress and halving the rations for around ten days. Serious offenses, such as causing loud noises, were met with beatings and blows, especially by warden Alexandru Vișinescu, whose favorite punishment was whipping. There was one political prisoner per each cell, kept under constant surveillance. Once or twice a week, individual prisoners were allowed a twenty-minute walk in the yard, head down and away from the windows. A doctor visited weekly; otherwise, an assistant was on hand to provide injections directly through the pants, or to push pills into the cell with his boot. More serious cases could be hospitalized, but this might be refused, or approved when the prisoner was already dead. Cold was a constant feature from September until May or June. The beds were kept near the open windows, which freely allowed cold air to enter. As detainees had to sleep facing the door, they would wake up with their heads covered in snow, in the event of a winter storm. Despite the prohibition, prisoners found ways to communicate, for example via a Morse Code during their walks: a single cough would represent a dot, a double, a dash. By such means, they were able to keep reasonably well informed about the situation inside the walls.

In late 1958, Mihalache, old and sick, entered into confrontation with the prison administration, refusing to leave his bed at five in the morning. Guards, often joined by the warden, would enter his cell, beat him viciously, throw him on the floor and remove the bed. From that point until his death in March 1963, his voice was heard daily, protesting against his treatment and lack of medical care. He was permanently beaten by Vișinescu and an aide; sometimes, guards would enter in the middle of winter, throwing a bucket of water on him. Jenică Arnăutu, a soldier and PNȚ member who had fought against the Communist regime in Bukovina, entered a hunger strike in July 1959, in order to gain admittance to a hospital. He was force-fed through a hose. The administration finally agreed to his demand, but before approval was obtained, he died in his cell in November. Deceased prisoners were buried secretly at night in mass graves at the edge of a cemetery. Prisoners deemed not sufficiently “re-educated” upon expiry of their sentences were forced to live in Rubla for one to five years. Coposu, Diaconescu and others were sent there in 1962, not allowed to leave the village, on pain of a fifteen-year sentence. In April 1963, the final prisoners still at Râmnicu Sărat were sent to Jilava and then elsewhere. The prison was shut down and used as a deposit until the Romanian Revolution.

Vișinescu, the warden of the prison from 1956 to 1963, and previously a political officer at Jilava and Mislea prisons, was convicted of crimes against humanity for his treatment of detainees in 2015, and sentenced to 20 years' imprisonment.

The former prison is included in a restoration and enhancement project, with €9 million in funding provided by the European Commission through the National Rehabilitation and Resilience Plan. By 2026, the facility will be transformed into the "Prison of Silence" Memorial and Educational Center.

== Inmates ==
This is a partial list of inmates at Sărat Prison; the symbol † indicates those who died there.

- Mircea Cancicov†
- Alexandru Cantacuzino†
- Liuba Chișinevschi
- Radu Ciuceanu
- Corneliu Zelea Codreanu
- Corneliu Coposu
- Ion Diaconescu
- Ion Gigurtu†
- Alexandru Iacob
- Gheorghe Jienescu
- Gheorghe N. Leon†
- Vasile Luca
- Horia Macellariu
- Ion Mihalache†
- Constantin Pantazi†
- Ana Pauker
- Constantin Titel Petrescu
- Ion Petrovici
- Gheorghe Plăcințeanu†
- Mihail Polihroniade†
- Victor Rădulescu-Pogoneanu
- Mihail Romniceanu†
- Nicolae Scarlat Stoenescu
- Alexandru Todea
