= Ion Boițeanu =

Romanian lieutenant general

Ion Boițeanu (10 October 1885–5 April 1946) was a Romanian lieutenant general during World War II.

After graduating from military school in 1909 with the rank of second lieutenant, he advance in rank to lieutenant (1912), captain (1916), major (1917), lieutenant-colonel (1925), colonel (1931), and brigadier general (1938).

Boițeanu served as Secretary-General Ministry of Defense in 1941 and General Officer Commanding 3rd Division. On 9 May 1941 he was awarded the Order of the Star of Romania, Commander class. In January 1942 he was promoted to major general. From 18 March to 25 May 1943, he was General Officer Commanding 19th Division, and fought on the Eastern Front. From May to September 1943, he was Acting General Officer Commanding Cavalry Corps, after which he was General Officer Commanding I Corps until April 1944. In January 1944 he advanced in rank to lieutenant general.

In April 1944, he became Director of the Higher Military School, a post he kept until 23 August 1944, when King Michael's Coup brought down Ion Antonescu from power. That same day, Boițeanu joined the first Sănătescu cabinet as Minister of National Culture and Religious Affairs, a position he served in until 3 November, when he was dismissed at the request of the Soviet-dominated Allied Control Commission, headed by General Vladislav Vinogradov. He also served for a few days at the beginning of September as acting Minister of Justice.

From 3 December 1944 to 8 April 1945 Boițeanu served as General Officer commanding the IV Corps. The Romanian troops under his command, in cooperation with units of the Soviet 7th Guards Army fought in 1945 in northern Hungary, conquering the Bükk mountains, thereby forcing the retreat of the Wehrmacht units defending the Mátra mountains.
