= Nicolae Păiș =

Nicolae T. Păiș (July 11, 1887–September 16, 1952) was a Romanian career naval officer.

Born in Bucharest, he attended the Military Academy of Modena between 1905 and 1907, and the École militaire in Paris. After graduating, he entered the Romanian Navy with the rank of second lieutenant, and was a participant in World War I. He rose to commodore July 1927 and counter-admiral in March 1937. From May 11 to July 4, 1940, Păiș was undersecretary of state in the Ministry of Air Force and Navy in the government of Gheorghe Tătărescu. Then, from July 4 to September 4, he was Minister of the Air Force and the Navy under the premiership of Ion Gigurtu. On August 30, Păiș participated in a meeting of King Carol II's Crown Council, where he was (alongside David Popescu, Gheorghe Mihail, and Ernest Ballif) one of the four out of five military representatives who recommended accepting the provisions of the Second Vienna Award, by which Romania were to cede Northern Transylvania to Hungary.

During the World War II-era rule of Ion Antonescu, Păiș served as naval undersecretary of state from 4 April 1941 to 19 February 1943, when he resigned. In November 1941 he was awarded the Order of the Crown of Romania, Grand Officer rank. He was made a vice-admiral in the reserves in October 1942.

His home was searched under the Romanian Communist Party-dominated government in May 1946, but nothing incriminating was found. Păiș was ill in bed, but was taken to the prison hospital at Văcărești. He was held for some time before being temporarily released. Rearrested by the communist regime in August 1948, he was sentenced to three years' imprisonment the following January as a former dignitary under Antonescu. In August 1951, he was moved from Aiud Prison to Sighet Prison, where he received no medical attention. In protest, he declared a hunger strike of forty days. He died a year later in cell 27, and his body was buried in a mass grave in Sighetu Marmației, on the banks of the Iza River.
