= Constantin Nicolescu =

Romanian military officer (1887–1972)

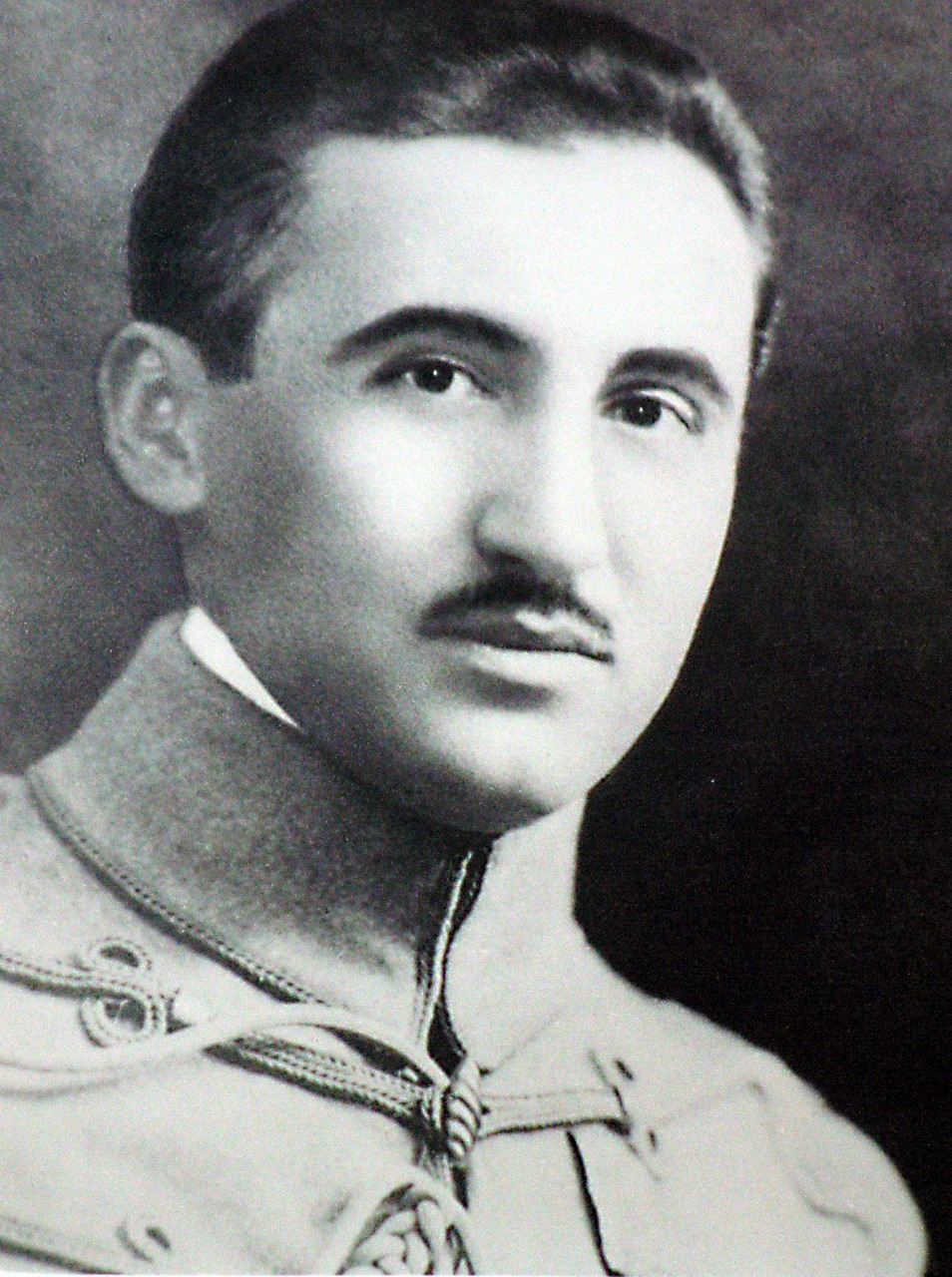
- Constantin Nicolescu
- Born: 5 November 1887; Bucharest, Kingdom of Romania
- Died: 6 July 1972 (aged 84)
- Allegiance: Kingdom of Romania
- Branch: Army
- Service years: 1913–1946
- Rank: Divisional general
- Conflicts: Second Balkan War; World War I; World War II; Second Jassy–Kishinev offensive
- Awards: Order of Michael the Brave, 3rd Class; Legion of Honour

62nd Minister of Defense
- In office 4 July 1940 – 4 September 1940
- Prime Minister: Ion Gigurtu
- Preceded by: Ioan Ilcuș
- Succeeded by: Ion Antonescu

Constantin D. Nicolescu (November 5, 1887 – July 6, 1972) was a Romanian career army officer, and Minister of Defense in July–September 1940.

== Biography ==
Born in Bucharest, he served as a second lieutenant during the Second Balkan War in 1913. During World War I, he was a captain in a cavalry regiment, and was decorated with the Order of Michael the Brave and the Legion of Honour. After being promoted to lieutenant colonel in 1923, he served as military attaché in Paris from 1925 to 1927. In 1929, with the rank of colonel, he began commanding the royal escort regiment. Made brigadier general in 1936, he entered the Defense Ministry as general secretary in 1938. In May 1940, he advanced to ministerial rank in the cabinet of Gheorghe Tătărăscu, holding office as undersecretary of state. He was elevated to the rank of divisional general in June 1940, and from July 4 to September 4, he was Defense Minister in the cabinet of Ion Gigurtu. In 1942, during World War II, he became military commander of Bucharest and in March 1943 he was placed in charge of the 5th Army Corps of the 4th Army (commanded by Ioan Mihail Racoviță).

On 20 August 1944, at the start of the Second Jassy–Kishinev offensive, his Army Corps was defending against the Red Army a 25 km (16 mi) wide front segment between Erbiceni and Rediu Mitropoliei, north of Iași. Nicolescu was among the generals who prepared the coup d'état of 23 August 1944. From November 1944 until the abolition of the monarchy in December 1947, he served as head of the royal household. An adviser to King Michael I and palace marshal, he presented daily reports to the king regarding the situation on the front, commenting upon the course of the war. After the end of the war, he continued to brief the king regarding discussions within the higher army council, which debated laws and other measure touching on the military. In May 1946, the same year he was sent into the reserves, he joined the leadership of Mișcărea Națională de Rezistență, an early group within the anti-communist resistance movement. Removed from the army in January 1948 by the new communist regime, he was arrested at the end of March. Later that year, he was sentenced to seven years' imprisonment for "plotting an uprising". His family was evicted from their home and persecuted. Part of his years in prison were spent at Jilava and Aiud. After being released in April 1955, he was not granted a pension and had to support himself by working on commission at an agency of Loteria Română.

Nicolescu lived in a stately house in Bucharest; built in 1890, the 16-room mansion was located on Știrbei Vodă Street, near the Cișmigiu Gardens.
