= Petre Țuțea =

Romanian philosopher (1902–1991)

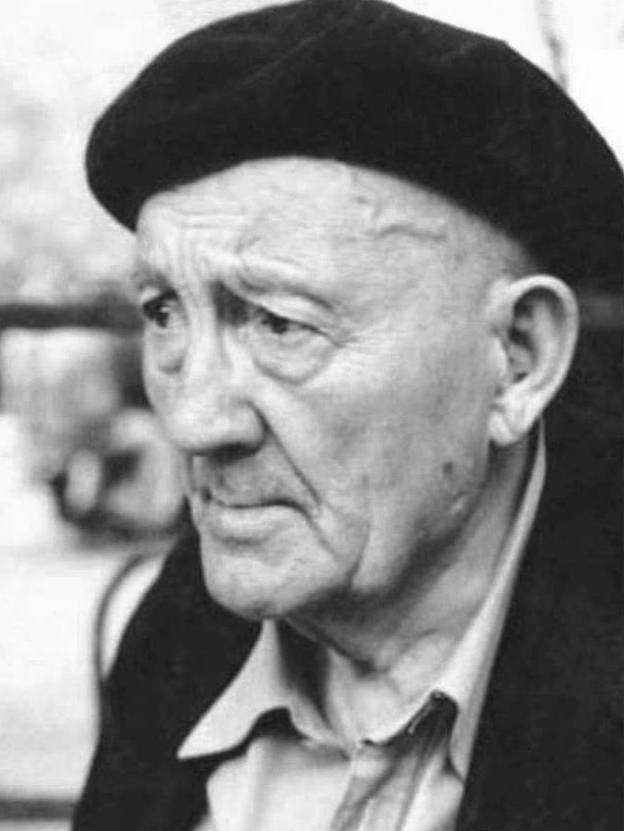
- Born: 6 October 1902; Boteni, Muscel County, Kingdom of Romania
- Died: 3 December 1991 (aged 89); Bucharest, Romania
- Resting place: Saint Parascheva Church, Boteni
- Education: University of Cluj
- Occupations: Philosopher, economist, essayist, journalist
- Writing career
- Pen name: Petre Boteanu
- Notable awards: Order of the Crown, Knight rank Order of the Star, Knight rank

Petre Țuțea (Romanian: [ˈpetre ˈt͡sut͡se̯a]; 6 October 1902 – 3 December 1991) was a Romanian philosopher, journalist, and economist.

== Biography ==
=== Early years and the Legionary Movement ===
Petre Țuțea was born in the village of Boteni, Muscel County (now in Argeș County). His father, Petre Bădescu, was a Romanian Orthodox priest and his mother, Ana Țuțea, was of peasant stock. In 1920, after the Union of Transylvania with Romania, Țuțea left his village to finish high school in Cluj and went on to study law at the University of Cluj. After graduating, he obtained in 1929 a Ph.D. in Administrative Law, also at the University of Cluj.

Țuțea moved to Bucharest and in 1932 he founded, together with Petre Pandrea, a leftist newspaper, "Stânga" ("The Left"), that was quickly and forcefully closed by the government. Although he was familiar with Marxist writings in his youth, he rejected it and later became a devout Orthodox Christian.

In 1935 Țuțea and four other writers published a nationalist program of economic and social development, "Manifestul Revoluției Naționale" ("Manifesto for a National Revolution"). Around the same time he met the influential philosopher Nae Ionescu and wrote for his famous newspaper, "Cuvântul", along with Mircea Eliade, Emil Cioran, Radu Gyr, Mircea Vulcănescu, Mihail Sebastian, and other known writers.

Țuțea was a member of the Criterion literary society and, like many other fellow members, became a sympathizer of the Iron Guard, a fascist organization. According to various published interviews of that time, Țuțea felt democracy would have not guaranteed the sovereignty of the Romanian people. He also noted that many Romanian intellectuals had supported the Legionnaires, because "their radical position against the harmful influence of Russian Bolshevism", which he considered to be "controlled by Jews" (see Judeo-Bolshevism). Speaking of the Iron Guard, Țuțea believed the main difference between this organization and Fascism or National Socialism was its avowed Christian character.

Between 1936 and 1939, he was a director in the Ministry of Trade and Industry, in charge of the Office of Economics Publications and Propaganda. In May 1937 Țuțea was awarded the Order of the Crown, Knight rank. He then was a director of the research office in the Ministry of Foreign Trade. As the National Legionary State was proclaimed in 1940, he was a member of the Romanian delegation to Moscow for economic negotiations. He returned after the National Legionary State was abolished (after January 1941). In May 1941 he was awarded the Order of the Star, Knight rank.

As the war against the Soviet Union began in June 1941, he asked to be sent to the front, but his request was refused. Țuțea worked as a director in the Ministry of War Economy and after King Michael's Coup of 23 August 1944, a director of studies in the Ministry of National Economy.

=== Communist era ===
Țuțea was arrested by the Communist regime in 1949, and was sent, without a trial, to "re-education" (euphemism for forced labor) at Ocnele Mari state prison. After he was released in 1953, and unable to find work, he lived with friends and relatives. Arrested again in 1956, he was tried for "conspiracy against the State". He was found guilty and sentenced to 18 years of hard labor, of which he served 8 years in various prisons, ending up in the infamous Aiud Prison.

After the release of all political prisoners in 1964, Petre Țuțea became a Socratic philosopher. He also started to write books and essays, created an original dramatic form, "theater as seminar", and produced a philosophical manifesto, "The Philosophy of Nuances" (1969). Due to censorship, very little of his work would be published, and virtually nothing appeared after 1972. Under permanent observation, Țuțea had many of his manuscripts confiscated by the Romanian secret police, the Securitate. In the late 1980s he started working on a massive unfinished project in 5 volumes; "Man, a Christian Treatise of Anthropology".

=== After the Revolution ===
After the Romanian Revolution of 1989, Țuțea was embraced by Romanian intellectuals, receiving frequent requests from journalists and TV crews for interviews while living for a year with a student in theology, Radu Preda. Țuțea spent the last year of his life in a Christian hospice, "Christiana". He died in Bucharest at age 89, before seeing any of his books published. He was buried in the cemetery next to Saint Parascheva Church in Boteni.

A very popular book (sold in more than 70,000 copies) is 322 de vorbe memorabile, a collection of aphorisms taken from various interviews, ordered alphabetically. In these interviews Țuțea adopted a hyperbolic, rhetorical style and the editor's choices included several controversial topics, such as atheism, Communism, and Antisemitism. He generally adopts a hardline Orthodox Christian point-of-view, being critical of various groups, including atheists (whom he names "weasels"), communists (naming communism a "social cancer") and Jews (whom he finds responsible for the existence of antisemitism).

A street in Iași and a school in Boteni bear his name. In 2017, a hall at Aiud Prison was dedicated to his memory; the Petre Țuțea Hall is a space intended for educational and psychosocial assistance activities in support of inmates.

== Bibliography ==
- Între Dumnezeu și neamul meu ("Between God and my Nation" – an early, fragmentary, very popular collection of interviews. Also contains unreliable editions of various essays)
- 322 de vorbe memorabile ("322 Memorable Words", a collection of aphorisms collected from interviews, alphabetically ordered by the editor)
- Filozofia nuanțelor: Eseuri, Portrete, Corespondență ("The Philosophy of Nuances, with other Essays, Portraits and Correspondence)
- Aurel-Dragoș Munteanu (a book written in 1972 about the Romanian writer who was one of Țuțea's best friends, later became a famous dissident and diplomat)
- Mircea Eliade (book about Eliade's scholarly, artistic and religious outlook)
- Reflecții religioase asupra cunoașterii ("Religious Reflections Upon Knowledge", a book on Plato's philosophy seen from a religious point of view)
- Lumea ca Teatru: Teatrul Seminar (World of Theatre: Theatre as Seminar)
- Omul; Tratat de antropologie creștină (Man: A Treatise of Christian Anthropology – an unfinished project of five volumes, of which the first two are published here: I. Problems, or The Book of Questions; II. Systems or The Books of Logical Wholes – Mathematical and Autonomous, Parallel to Ontic Wholes)
