= Ion C. Marinescu =

Romanian lawyer, politician and industrialist

Minister of National Economy
- In office 26 May 1941 – 14 August 1942
- Prime Minister: Ion Antonescu
- Preceded by: Gheorghe Potopeanu
- Succeeded by: Ion I. Fințescu

70th Minister of Finance
- In office 8 April 1942 – 25 September 1942
- Prime Minister: Ion Antonescu
- Preceded by: Nicolae Scarlat Stoenescu
- Succeeded by: Alexandru D. Neagu

Minister of Justice
- In office 14 August 1942 – 23 August 1944
- Prime Minister: Ion Antonescu
- Preceded by: Constantin C. Stoicescu
- Succeeded by: Lucrețiu Pătrășcanu

Personal details
- Born: November 10, 1886 Bucharest, Kingdom of Romania
- Died: January 10, 1956 (aged 69) Aiud Prison, Romanian People's Republic
- Education: University of Bucharest
- Occupation: Lawyer, industrialist
- Awards: Order of the Crown of Romania, Grand Cross class

Ion C. Marinescu (November 10, 1886 – January 15, 1956) was a Romanian lawyer, politician and industrialist.

Born in Bucharest, Marinescu graduated from the law faculty at the University of Bucharest. He was vice president of the General Union of Industrialists in Romania and headed the Concordia petroleum company. In 1922 he commissioned architect Paul Smărăndescu to design and build an apartment building with two floors and a mansard roof on Tudor Arghezi Street, in Bucharest.

Marinescu was Minister of National Economy under Ion Antonescu from May 26, 1941, to August 14, 1942, and also served as Minister of Finance from April 8 to September 25, 1942. On August 14, 1942, he became Minister of Justice, serving in that position until King Michael's Coup of August 23, 1944. Arrested in October, he was charged with contributing to Romania's attack on the Soviet Union via his submissive policy towards Nazi Germany. Tried during the Post-World War II Romanian war crime trials, he was sentenced to twenty years at hard labor on May 17, 1946. He spent time at the prisons in Jilava and Aiud, where he died nearly a decade later.

In November 1941, Marinescu was awarded the Order of the Crown of Romania, Grand Cross class.
