= Constantin Petrovicescu =

Romanian soldier and politician

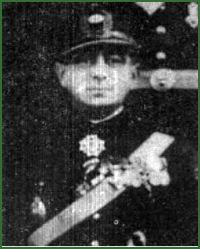
Constantin Petrovicescu

Constantin Petrovicescu (Romanian pronunciation: [konstanˈtim petroviˈtʃesku]; October 22, 1883 – September 8, 1949) was a Romanian soldier and politician, who served as Interior Minister from September 14, 1940, to January 21, 1941, during the National Legionary State.

A sympathizer and secret member of the fascist Iron Guard movement, he was also the royal commissioner involved in the 1934 acquittal of Guard leader Corneliu Zelea Codreanu. Petrovicescu was assigned his ministerial position by Codreanu's successor Horia Sima, serving as one of the main Iron Guardists in the conflicted cabinet headed by Ion Antonescu. In this capacity, he helped Sima obtain control of an armed structure, and, taking the party's side during the Legionnaires' rebellion of 1941, helped organize it in combat against Antonescu.

Captured and tried, Petrovicescu spent the longer part of World War II in confinement or house arrest. He was retried for war crimes two years after King Michael's Coup of August 1944, and sentenced to life imprisonment. He died in Aiud Prison almost two years after a Romanian communist regime had been established.

== Biography ==
Born in Târgu Jiu, Petrovicescu attended the military school for infantry in Craiova from 1896 to 1899, the officers' school in Bucharest from 1899 to 1900, and the military school for infantry and cavalry from 1906 to 1908. During World War I Romanian Campaign, he fought on the Moldavian front. Following the Union of Bessarabia with Romania in 1918, Petrovicescu, by then a high-ranking officer, was named chief of the general staff in that province's territorial command. Later, until 1933, he was royal commissioner at the Chișinău army corps.

After being named brigadier general, at the beginning of 1934, he was transferred to the national capital, where he served as royal commissioner at the Bucharest Military Tribunal. In this capacity, he was part of a panel of judges who tried the Iron Guard (Legionnaire) assassins of Prime Minister Ion G. Duca and their moral accomplices. The latter category included Guard leaders Codreanu and retired general Gheorghe Cantacuzino-Grănicerul, as well as prominent affiliates such as Gheorghe Clime, Nichifor Crainic, and Mihai Stelescu. He voted to convict the assassins themselves (the Nicadori), but supported the acquittal of Codreanu and Cantacuzino-Grănicerul. He soon after secretly joined the banned Guard and, in recognition for his stance during the trial, was named a member of its senate. At Codreanu's trial in April–May 1938, Petrovicescu appeared as a witness for the defence, praising Codreanu's "proper behaviour" and "patriotism". Due to his repeatedly expressed pro-Iron Guard sympathies, King Carol II retired him in September 1938.

Two years later, following Carol's abdication and the assumption of power by General Ion Antonescu and the Guard (together ruling a National Legionary State, with Antonescu as Conducător and Prime Minister), the new ruling party recommended Petrovicescu as Interior Minister, and he assumed that post. In October 1940, upon the recommendation of vice premier and new Legion head Horia Sima, Antonescu promoted Petrovicescu to the rank of divisional general retroactive to June 1, 1938, and returned him to active duty. As minister, he worked with Sima to create a well-armed Legionary police force, and actively supported arresting or even killing politicians who in the past had suppressed the Guard. The new police force also turned itself into a tool of racial repression, targeting the Jewish-Romanian community.

Petrovicescu irritated Antonescu by upholding public acts of violent retribution, and this fall-out acquired importance by the close of 1940. In particular, the Conducător suspected his Legionnaire subordinate of having played a part in organizing the Jilava Massacre of November 1940, during which the political elite associated with Carol's rule was mass murdered. On January 19, 1941, after the Nazi German Major Döring had been mysteriously assassinated in Bucharest, Sima's faction publicly questioned Antonescu's commitment to Romania's Axis allies, and the Conducător used the occasion to strip Petrovicescu of his cabinet office. The official explanation for his decision was that Petrovicescu had not taken the proper measures to secure the perimeter within nine hours of Döring's shooting. The next day, as Antonescu signaled his marginalization of the Guard, a large part of the country was gripped by a Legionnaires' rebellion. At an early stage of the riots, leading Guard member Viorel Trifa issued a manifesto which directly blamed the "brave and upright" minister's dismissal on Antonescu's alleged sympathy for "the British government of freemasons", accompanying such claims with antisemitic language. Other such theories popularized by the Legionnaires had it that Antonescu had personally encouraged Demetrios Sarandos, Döring's Greek-Turkish killer, to carry out his action, thus aiming to discredit Petrovicescu's political abilities.

Petrovicescu was an important destabilising element during the subsequent events, which saw his and the Guard's fall into disgrace. He is believed to have had the personal initiative for one of the most notorious acts of violence carried out at the time, by ordering the Legionnaires to occupy the headquarters of the Siguranța Statului secret police and open fire on the soldiers and civilians outside. Petrovicescu was arrested and tried along with other former Legionnaire government officials. In summer 1941, he was sentenced to five or seven years' imprisonment. In 1944, he was sent to Sibiu to live under house arrest.

Following the 1944 coup d'état, which changed Romania's political orientation away from the Axis, Petrovicescu was again arrested, being held in the prisons of Alba Iulia and later Sibiu. In 1946, he was tried (simultaneously with Antonescu himself) before the first of a series of postwar Romanian war crime trials as a war criminal. Sentenced to life imprisonment, he was sent to Aiud prison after his appeal was rejected. He died there three years later.
