= Ion V. Gruia =

Romanian jurist and politician

Minister of Justice
- In office 4 July 1940 – 4 September 1940
- Prime Minister: Ion Gigurtu
- Preceded by: Aurelian Bentoiu
- In office 4 September 1940 – 14 September 1940
- Prime Minister: Ion Antonescu
- Succeeded by: Mihai Antonescu

Personal details
- Born: November 14, 1895 Roman, Kingdom of Romania
- Died: November 14, 1952 (aged 57) Sighet Prison, Romanian People's Republic
- Occupation: Jurist, academic, politician

Ion V. Gruia (November 14, 1895–November 14, 1952) was a Romanian jurist who briefly served in government in 1940.

Born in Roman, he obtained a doctorate in law and practiced as a lawyer. He was also a professor of constitutional and administrative law at the law faculty of the University of Bucharest, where he became dean in 1941. He was a member of the Assembly of Deputies. He served as Minister of Justice in two cabinets during the summer of 1940: under Ion Gigurtu from July 4 to September 4, and under Ion Antonescu from September 4 to 14, until the establishment of the National Legionary State. While minister, Gruia helped introduce an anti-Jewish law. Taking up a discourse articulated by eugenicist Petru Râmneanțu in 1935, he declared in a statement published on August 9, "We consider Romanian blood as a fundamental element in the founding of the Nation." He proceeded to invoke historical motives and "the realities of Romania" in order to justify the law, which banned Jews from owning rural properties, using Romanian names or marrying ethnic Romanians; segregating Jews in schools and dismissing all Jewish state employees within three to six months (a process that had already begun in July). Removed from teaching in 1948, shortly after the communist regime was established, he was arrested in 1949. In 1950, he was sent to Sighet Prison, where he died two years later.
