= Ion Macovei =

Romanian engineer

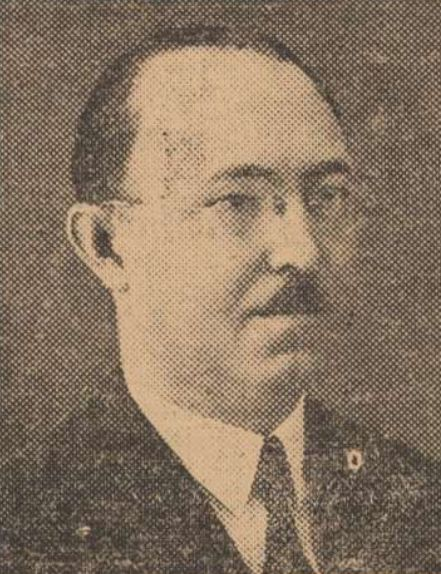
Ion Macovei (c. 1936)

Ion Macovei (August 25, 1885–October 12, 1950) was a Romanian engineer who briefly served in government in 1940.

Born in Nereju, Vrancea County, he attended a polytechnic institute in Germany and became an engineer. Hired by the state railway carrier Căile Ferate Române in 1911, he rose through the ranks from maintenance work at Adjud and Bârlad to inspector at Galați in 1919 to deputy department head (1931) and department head (1932), before becoming deputy general director in 1935 and general director in 1936.

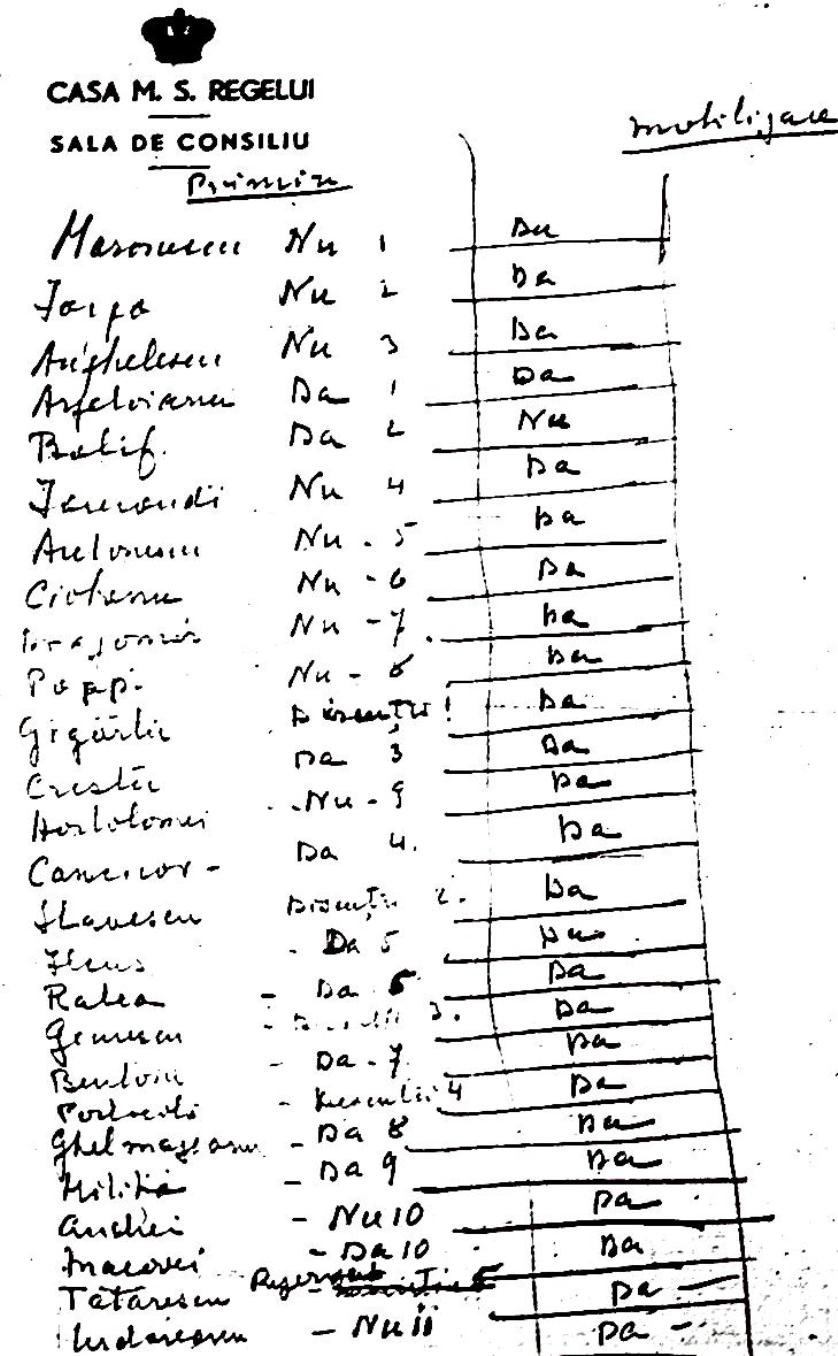
Macovei's vote on the Soviet ultimatum and mobilization, registered on Romanian government stationery, alongside those of his cabinet colleagues

On June 1, 1940, he entered the cabinet of Gheorghe Tătărescu as Minister of Public Works and Communications. He replaced Ion Gigurtu, who in turn replaced Grigore Gafencu as Foreign Minister. The latter had resigned in protest against the backdrop of German victories in Western Europe. In late June, when the Soviet Union launched an ultimatum just before occupying Bessarabia and Northern Bukovina, Macovei, as part of the Crown Council, voted with the majority to accept the ultimatum. When Gigurtu ascended to the post of Prime Minister on July 4, Macovei remained in his cabinet. The final phase of his ministerial service lasted from September 4 to 14, from the time Ion Antonescu assumed power to the establishment of the National Legionary State. Arrested by the communist regime in May 1950, he died at Sighet Prison five months later. His wife Ecaterina was arrested in 1952; sent to forced labor, she was freed in 1954.
