= Gheorghe N. Leon =

Romanian professor and politician (1888 - 1959)

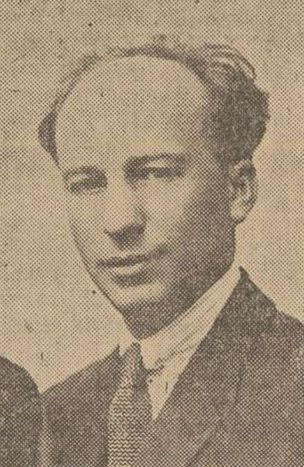
Gheorghe N. Leon

Gheorghe N. Leon (April 29, 1888 – December 29, 1959) was a Romanian economist and politician.

Born in Iași, his father was the biologist Nicolae Leon. He graduated from the law faculty of the University of Iași, followed in 1914 by a doctorate in political economy and finance from the University of Jena, where his doctoral adviser was Lujo Brentano. After World War I and the union of Transylvania with Romania, he was hired as to teach finance and statistics at the law faculty of the new Cluj University. He was also affiliated with the Cluj Commercial Academy, entering that institution in 1919 and rising to full professor in 1926. In 1935, he was transferred to the University of Bucharest. In 1926, he became general secretary at the Industry and Commerce Ministry, while from October 1934 to August 1936, he was deputy state secretary at the Agriculture and Domains Ministry. In 1936, he became a censor at the National Bank of Romania, and the following year joined the administration of the Romanian Radio Broadcasting Company. He belonged to the National Liberal Party, and was elected to the Assembly of Deputies in 1927. The president of the Romanian Economists' Society, in 1926 he founded and began editing Analele statistice și economice magazine.

During the latter half of the year 1940, Leon held several ministerial posts. From July 4 until September 14, a period that spanned the Ion Gigurtu ministry and the first ten days of Ion Antonescu's rule, he was Minister of National Economy and interim Minister of Finance and of Agriculture and Domains. Additionally, from July 4 to 10, he was interim Foreign Trade Minister. After the founding of the National Legionary State on September 14, he remained as National Economy Minister until November 10. At that point, he resigned and resumed his university activity. In May 1946, under a Romanian Communist Party-dominated government, he was arrested, and in September 1947 was removed from teaching. Rearrested in 1948, shortly after a communist regime was imposed, he was tried for war crimes by a military court together with other members of the Gigurtu government and sentenced to prison. He was held at both Jilava and Sighet prisons, and after the latter was closed in 1955, was sent to Râmnicu Sărat Prison. He died there in 1959.
