= Gheron Netta =

Ion Antonescu's last Finance Minister

Minister of Finance (Romania)
- In office 1 April 1944 – 23 August 1944
- Prime Minister: Ion Antonescu
- Preceded by: Alexandru D. Neagu
- Succeeded by: Gheorghe Potopeanu

Personal details
- Born: 22 March 1891 Drobeta Turnu-Severin, Kingdom of Romania
- Died: 28 August 1955 (aged 64) Aiud, Romanian People's Republic
- Education: Universities in Leipzig and Zurich (doctorate in economy)
- Occupation: University professor, writer
- Known for: His posthumous rehabilitation for crimes against peace

Gheron Netta (March 22, 1891, Turnu Severin - August 28, 1955, Aiud) was a Romanian university professor and politician who served as the last Finance Minister of the World War II Axis regime of Ion Antonescu, from 1 April to 23 August 1944, when Romania switched sides. The postwar Communist regime sentenced Gheron Netta for "crimes against peace", but the Romanian Supreme Court rehabilitated him on 17 January 2000.

== Post-WW2 conviction and post-Communist exoneration ==
The legal rehabilitation of Gheron Netta was requested by Attorney General Mircea Criste, who in 1999 introduced a procedure of Extraordinary Appeal. Netta was tried in 1946, in a lot which included his deputy, Mircea Vulcănescu. In 1948, he was convicted to 10 years of hard imprisonment, 10 years of civic degradation, and the seizure of his assets for war crimes. The Attorney General considered that the basis for Netta's conviction - which, according to the law in force at the time, was his direct participation in the decisions of declaring and continuing the war - did not in fact apply to him. According to the minutes of the government sessions that Netta had attended, Attorney General Criste emphasized that his position had been "strictly technicist, apolitical; his interventions concerned the adoption of austerity measures dictated by the precarious economic state of the country". Criste also insisted that the economic agreement with Nazi Germany was concluded prior to Netta's mandate, so the latter was merely forced to accomplish his duties, albeit reluctantly, trying to tone down the requests of the Germans. The nine judges of Romania's highest court went on to exonerate Netta, even expressing appreciation for his results "in matter of national interest" within the Antonescu Cabinet, such as saving the country's treasury by hiding it at the Tismana Monastery. His acquittal implicitly entailed the reversal of the seizing of his assets, meaning that his daughters received as inheritance two buildings in Bucharest with a total of 76 apartments.

== Published works ==
As a university professor with a doctorate in economy who attended universities in Leipzig and Zurich, Gheron Netta published numerous works on economic matters, mainly books on Romanian economic relations with other countries, such as Poland, Hungary and Austria. As well as books on banking, savings, and markets.
