= Mihai Antonescu =

Former Deputy Prime Minister of Romania

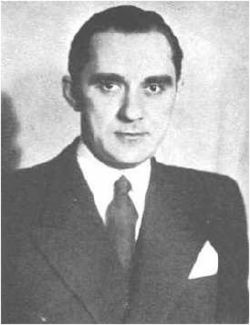

Vice President of the Council of Ministers
- In office 20 January 1941 – 23 August 1944
- Monarch: Mihai I
- Prime Minister: Ion Antonescu
- Preceded by: Horia Sima
- Succeeded by: Petru Groza

Minister of Foreign Affairs
- In office 29 June 1941 – 23 August 1944
- Prime Minister: Ion Antonescu
- Preceded by: Ion Antonescu (interim)
- Succeeded by: Grigore Niculescu-Buzești

Minister of National Propaganda
- (Acting)
- In office 26 May 1941 – 23 August 1944
- Prime Minister: Ion Antonescu
- Preceded by: Nichifor Crainic
- Succeeded by: Office abolished

Minister of Justice
- In office 14 September 1940 – 24 January 1941
- Prime Minister: Ion Antonescu
- Preceded by: Ion V. Gruia
- Succeeded by: Gheorghe Docan

Personal details
- Born: November 18, 1904 Nucet, Dâmbovița County, Kingdom of Romania
- Died: 1 June 1946 (aged 41) Jilava Prison, Ilfov County, Kingdom of Romania
- Cause of death: Execution by firing squad
- Party: National Liberal Party-Brătianu (1930–1938)
- Education: Saint Sava National College; University of Bucharest
- Profession: Lawyer
- Awards: Order of the Star of Romania, Grand Cross class

Mihai Antonescu (18 November 1904 – 1 June 1946) was a Romanian politician who served as Deputy Prime Minister and Foreign Minister during World War II, and was executed in 1946 as a war criminal.

== Early career ==
Born in Nucet, Dâmbovița County, he went to school in Pitești, and then at the Saint Sava National College in Bucharest. From 1922 to 1926 he attended the Faculty of Law of the University of Bucharest. Antonescu made his living as an attorney before becoming the Minister of Foreign Affairs to Prime Minister Ion Antonescu (to whom he was not closely related) in 1940. Antonescu was initially not an extremist or supporter of the Iron Guard, whose leaders held prominent positions in Ion Antonescu's government in 1940–1941 (see National Legionary State); in the 1930s, he was a member of the National Liberal Party-Brătianu.

As a minister, he drifted to the far right, and established contacts with the German Nazi Party. Antonescu subsequently became one of Ion Antonescu's most trusted advisors, especially when the Iron Guard's leader, Horia Sima (who was also deputy prime minister), became increasingly uncooperative. He was effective in censoring governmental critics and enforcing blatant Anti-Semitism in the media.

When the Iron Guard was suppressed and removed from power in January 1941 as a result of the Legionnaires' Rebellion and Bucharest Pogrom, Mihai Antonescu was promoted to Deputy Prime Minister and Minister of Foreign Affairs, making him the second most powerful man in the country (see Romania during World War II).

== Prominence ==
Throughout 1941, especially after the Invasion of the Soviet Union, Ion Antonescu primarily focused on Romania's military affairs, leaving Mihai Antonescu in almost full control of the country's domestic matters. Although initially uncomfortable with Romania's close alliance with Germany, Antonescu strengthened the nation's ties with Adolf Hitler's regime after a string of early Axis victories against the Soviets. Antonescu primarily attempted to gain Germany's favor by persecuting Romania's Jews. Essentially running the interior ministry, he drafted a series of laws that resulted in thousands of Romania's Jews being forced out of their jobs and positions, while at the same time being denied access to countless other careers. More such laws resulted in the country's Jews having their property seized.

Throughout 1941, Antonescu would approve the pogrom against the Jews of Iași, stop the emigration of Jews from Romania, and remove the Romanian government's protection of Romanian Jews outside the country, thus leaving them in German-occupied areas at the mercy of the Nazis. He also approved the slaughter of Jews in Bessarabia and Bukovina, and the deportation of the survivors to concentration camps in Transnistria. In November 1941, he was awarded the Order of the Star of Romania, Grand Cross class.

== Late in the war and execution ==
As 1942 came to a close, Ion Antonescu became alarmed at the deterioration of the Axis war effort and started looking for ways to withdraw Romania from the war. He attempted to persuade Hitler to make peace with the Western Allies and focus the full power of the Axis forces on the Soviet Union. When the Soviets won the Battle of Stalingrad on 2 February 1943, Antonescu came to the conclusion that the war was lost for the Axis, proceeding to destroy files and documents that revealed his active persecution of Romania's Jews. With Ion Antonescu's approval, he came to advocate the withdrawal from conflict of all minor allies of the Nazis – Romania, Hungary, Italy, and Finland.

Antonescu believed Benito Mussolini was powerful enough to stand up to Hitler, and that Italy could successfully negotiate an armistice with the Western Allies. Under Antonescu's plan, the four states and other European nations would turn against Hitler and join the Allies against Germany. In his capacity as foreign minister, Antonescu strengthened Romania's ties with Italy and paid a visit to Mussolini in June 1943, at which time he discovered that Mussolini agreed with certain aspects of his plan but was less than enthusiastic in regard to actually implementing it. Antonescu subsequently increased his efforts to improve Romania's relations with the United States and Great Britain. As such, he stopped the deportations of Romania's Jews, allowed Jewish emigration to non-Axis nations, and repatriated those who had survived Transnistria.

On 23 August 1944, as Soviet forces drew closer and closer to Romania, King Michael dismissed the government of Ion Antonescu, declared the nation's surrender, and had Mihai Antonescu arrested (see 1944 Romanian coup d'état). He was subsequently handed over to the new authorities, tried by a Communist Party-influenced Bucharest People's Tribunal, and found guilty of war crimes. He was executed by a firing squad, together with Ion Antonescu, Constantin Z. Vasiliu, and Gheorghe Alexianu, near the fort of Jilava. His resting place is unknown.

== See also ==
- Latin Axis (World War II)

Political offices
Preceded by Ion Antonescu	Vice President of the Council of Ministers; 1941–1944	Succeeded by Grigore Niculescu-Buzești
Preceded by Ion Antonescu	Minister of Foreign Affairs; 1941–1944	Succeeded by Grigore Niculescu-Buzești
