= Argeșanu cabinet =

Romanian government cabinet

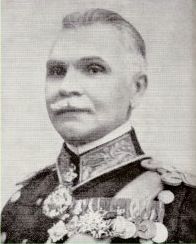
Gheorghe Argeșanu

The cabinet of Gheorghe Argeșanu was the government of Romania from 21 September to 28 September 1939. After the assassination of his predecessor, Armand Călinescu, by the Iron Guard, the Argeșanu cabinet's primary achievement was apprehension and execution of the assassins and wave of killings of Iron Guardsmen. The government lasted only seven days and was followed by the Argetoianu cabinet.

== Composition ==
The ministers of the cabinet were as follows:

- President of the Council of Ministers:

- Gen. Gheorghe Argeșanu (21 - 28 September 1939)

- Minister of the Interior:

- Gabriel Marinescu (21 - 28 September 1939)

- Minister of Foreign Affairs:

- Grigore Gafencu (21 - 28 September 1939)

- Minister of Finance:

- Mitiță Constantinescu (21 - 28 September 1939)

- Minister of Justice:

- Victor Iamandi (21 - 28 September 1939)

- Minister of National Defence:

- Gen. Ioan Ilcuș (21 - 28 September 1939)

- Minister of Air and Marine:

- Gen. Paul Teodorescu (21 - 28 September 1939)

- Minister of Materiel:

- Victor Slăvescu (21 - 28 September 1939)

- Minister of National Economy:

- Ion Bujoiu (21 - 28 September 1939)

- Minister of Agriculture and Property

- Nicolae Cornățeanu (21 - 28 September 1939)

- Minister of National Education:

- Petre Andrei (21 - 28 September 1939)

- Minister of Religious Affairs and the Arts:

- Nicolae Zigre (21 - 28 September 1939)

- Minister of Labour:

- Mihail Ralea (21 - 28 September 1939)

- Minister of Health and Social Security

- Gen. Nicolae Marinescu (21 - 28 September 1939)

- Minister of Public Works and Communications:

- Mihail Ghelmegeanu (21 - 28 September 1939)

- Minister of State for Minorities:

- Silviu Dragomir (21 - 28 September 1939)

Preceded by Călinescu cabinet	Cabinet of Romania; 21 September 1939 - 28 September 1939	Succeeded by Argetoianu cabinet
