= Argetoianu cabinet =

Cabinet of the Romanian Government from September 28th to November 23rd

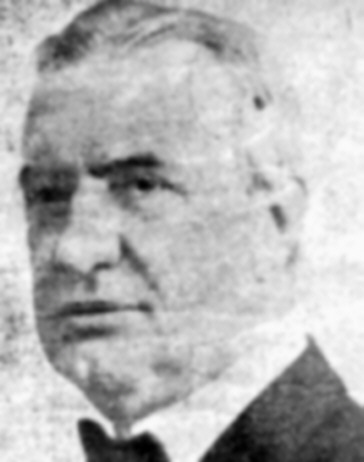
Constantin Argetoianu

The cabinet of Constantin Argetoianu was the government of Romania from 28 September to 23 November 1939.

== Composition ==
The ministers of the cabinet were as follows:

- President of the Council of Ministers:

- Constantin Argetoianu (28 September - 23 November 1939)

- Minister of the Interior:

- Nicolae Ottescu (28 September - 23 November 1939)

- Minister of Foreign Affairs:

- Grigore Gafencu (28 September - 23 November 1939)

- Minister of Finance:

- Mitiță Constantinescu (28 September - 23 November 1939)

- Minister of Justice:

- Victor Iamandi (28 September - 23 November 1939)

- Minister of National Defence:

- Gen. Ioan Ilcuș (28 September - 23 November 1939)

- Minister of Air and Marine:

- Gen. Paul Teodorescu (28 September - 23 November 1939)

- Minister of Materiel:

- Victor Slăvescu (28 September - 23 November 1939)

- Minister of National Economy:

- Ion Bujoiu (28 September - 23 November 1939)

- Minister of Agriculture and Property

- Nicolae Cornățeanu (28 September - 23 November 1939)

- Minister of National Education:

- Petre Andrei (28 September - 23 November 1939)

- Minister of Religious Affairs and the Arts:

- Nicolae Zigre (28 September - 23 November 1939)

- Minister of Labour:

- Mihail Ralea (28 September - 23 November 1939)

- Minister of Health and Social Security

- Gen. Nicolae Marinescu (28 September - 23 November 1939)

- Minister of Public Works and Communications:

- Mihail Ghelmegeanu (28 September - 23 November 1939)

- Minister of Public Order:

- Gabriel Marinescu (28 September - 23 November 1939)

- Minister of Propaganda:

- Alexandru Radian (28 September - 23 November 1939)

- Minister of Public Wealth:

- Traian Pop (28 September - 23 November 1939)

- Minister in charge of the National Renaissance Front:

- Constantin C. Giurăscu (28 September - 23 November 1939)

- Minister of State for Minorities:

- Silviu Dragomir (28 September - 23 November 1939)

Preceded by Argeșanu cabinet	Cabinet of Romania; 28 September 1939 - 23 November 1939	Succeeded by Fifth Tătărăscu cabinet
