= Third Tătărăscu cabinet =

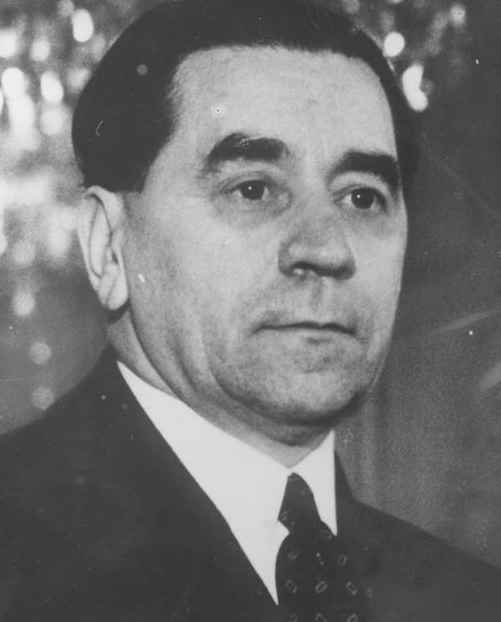
Gheorghe Tătărăscu

The third cabinet of Gheorghe Tătărăscu was the government of Romania from 29 August 1936 to 14 November 1937.

== Composition ==
The ministers of the cabinet were as follows:

- President of the Council of Ministers:

- Gheorghe Tătărăscu (29 August 1936 - 14 November 1937)

- Vice President of the Council of Ministers:

- Ion Inculeț (29 August 1936 - 14 November 1937)

- Minister of the Interior:

- Dumitru Iuca (29 August 1936 - 23 February 1937)
- Gheorghe Tătărăscu (23 February - 14 November 1937)

- Minister of Foreign Affairs:

- Victor Antonescu (29 August 1936 - 14 November 1937)

- Minister of Finance:

- Mircea Cancicov (29 August 1936 - 14 November 1937)

- Minister of Justice:

- Mircea Djuvara (29 August 1936 - 23 February 1937)
- Vasile P. Sassu (23 February - 14 November 1937)

- Minister of National Defence:

- Gen. Paul Angelescu (29 August 1936 - 28 August 1937)
- (interim) Radu Irimescu (28 August - 4 September 1937)
- Gen. Constantin Ilasievici (4 September - 14 November 1937)

- Minister of Armaments:

- Gheorghe Tătărăscu (29 August 1936 - 23 February 1937)

- Minister of Air and Marine:

- Nicolae Caranfil (13 November 1936 - 1 January 1937)
- (interim) Gheorghe Tătărăscu (1 - 7 January 1937)
- Radu Irimescu (7 January - 14 November 1937)

- Minister of Agriculture and Property

- Vasile P. Sassu (29 August 1936 - 23 February 1937)
- (interim) Vasile P. Sassu (23 February - 14 November 1937)

- Minister of Industry and Commerce:

- Valeriu Pop (29 August 1936 - 14 November 1937)

- Minister of Public Works and Communications:

- Richard Franasovici (29 August 1936 - 14 November 1937)

- Minister of Public Instruction:

- Constantin Angelescu (29 August 1936 - 14 November 1937)

- Minister of Religious Affairs and the Arts:

- Victor Iamandi (29 August 1936 - 9 March 1937)

- Minister of Labour:

- Ion Nistor (9 August 1936 - 14 November 1937)

- Minister of Health and Social Security

- Ion Costinescu (9 August 1936 - 14 November 1937)

- Minister of State with responsibility for Cooperation:

- Mihail Negură (29 August 1936 - 14 November 1937)

- Ministers of State:

- Alexandru Lapedatu (29 August 1936 - 14 November 1937)
- Dumitru Iuca (23 February - 7 April 1937)
- Mircea Djuvara (23 February - 7 April 1937)

Preceded by Second Tătărăscu cabinet	Cabinet of Romania; 29 August 1936 - 14 November 1937	Succeeded by Fourth Tătărăscu cabinet
