= Goga cabinet =

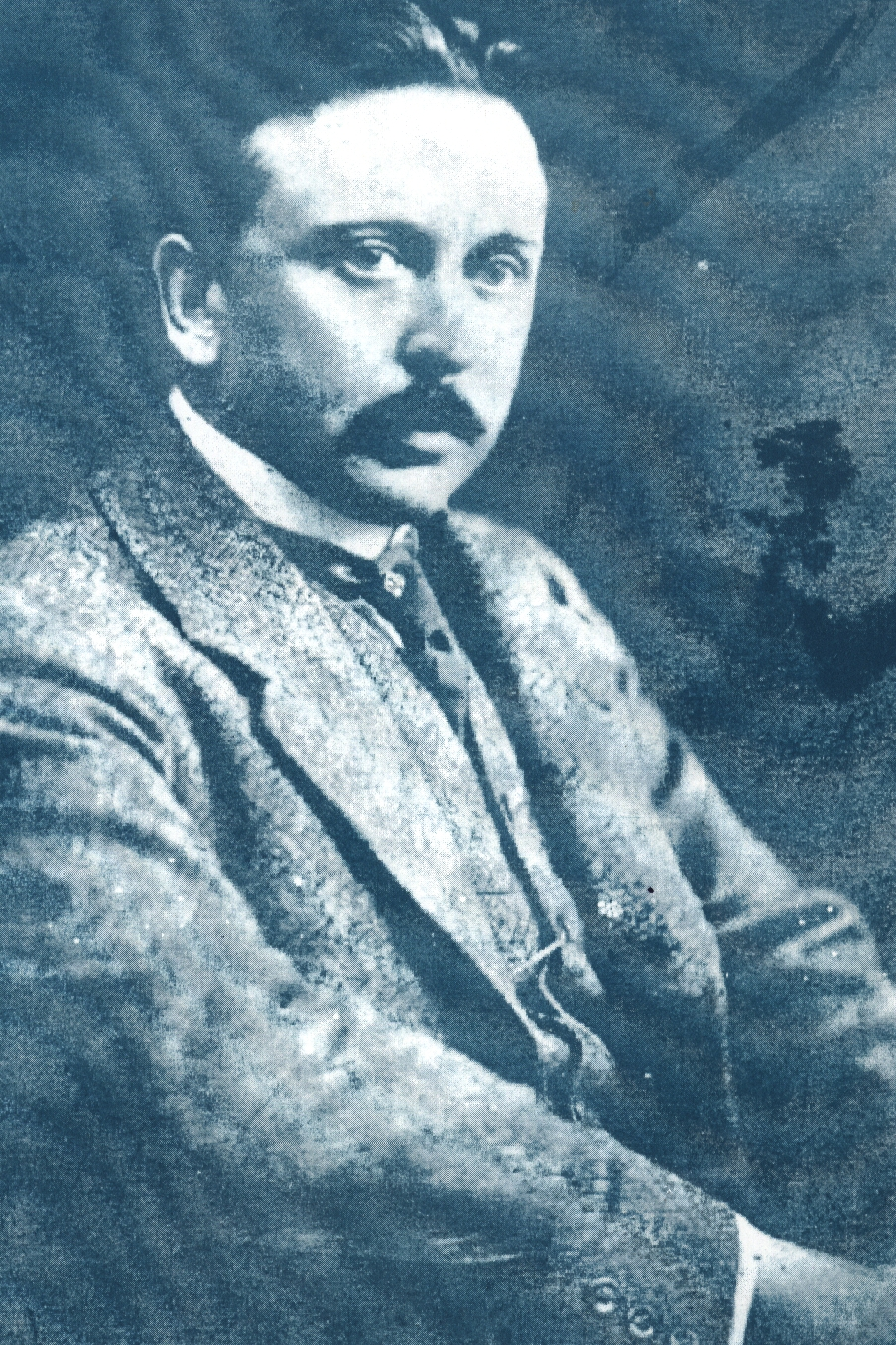
Octavian Goga

The cabinet of Octavian Goga was the government of Romania from 29 December 1937 to 10 February 1938.

== The Goga cabinet and the King ==
When the National Liberal Party lost the elections in December 1937, King Carol II appointed Goga Prime Minister of Romania, although the National Christian Party had obtained only 9.15% of the votes for the house. Carol II expected the government to be transitional, allowing him to get rid of the party system. He wrote in his diary that he was conscious that the government would not last long and that, after its collapse, he would be able to free his country and himself from the tyranny and the petty interests of the parties.

This calculation proved correct. However, the King miscalculated the impact of the Antisemitic measures of the Goga cabinet, which he had to deal with throughout his personal regime (the so-called royal dictatorship) that he established on 10 February 1938. The Goga cabinet stripped the Jews of their citizenship, limited their right to work, and simply harassed them through its antisemitic measures, in an effort to gain the support of the electors of the Iron Guard, another anti-Semitic movement and the rival of both the National Christian Party and the king. As a result, the Goga cabinet damaged the Romanian economy and the relations with France, Great Britain, and the League of Nations and strengthened the Iron Guard. Its revision of the Romanian citizenship, as implemented by King Carol II's personal regime, denaturalised 225,222 Jews, i.e., approximately 30% of the population of Jewish faith.

King Carol II first pushed towards a victory of the government in the snap elections in March 1938, which he had called on 18 January 1938. However, he soon abandoned Goga, preparing a coup together with the minister of the Interior Armand Călinescu, a former member of the National Peasants' Party, who acted as a guarantee for the king in the government. The coup was probably precipitated when Goga negotiated an electoral agreement with Corneliu Zelea Codreanu, the leader of the Iron Guard, on 8 February 1938, thus posing a considerable threat to the king's power. On 9 February 1938, Carol II, Călinescu and the former National Liberal Prime Minister Gheorghe Tătărescu set the coup for the next day. On 10 February 1938, Carol II received Goga and told him to postpone the snap elections, whereupon Goga resigned.

== Composition ==
The ministers of the cabinet were as follows:

- President of the Council of Ministers:

- Octavian Goga (29 December 1937 – 10 February 1938)

- Minister of the Interior:

- Armand Călinescu (29 December 1937 – 10 February 1938)

- Minister of Foreign Affairs:

- Istrate Micescu (29 December 1937 – 10 February 1938)

- Minister of Finance:

- Eugen Savu (29 December 1937 – 10 February 1938)

- Minister of Justice:

- Vasile Rădulescu-Mehedinți (29 December 1937 – 10 February 1938)

- Minister of National Defence:

- Gen. Ion Antonescu (29 December 1937 – 10 February 1938)

- Minister of Air and Marine:

- Radu Irimescu (29 December 1937 – 10 February 1938)

- Minister of Agriculture and Property

- (interim) Virgil Potârcă (29 December 1937 – 8 January 1938)
- (interim) D.R. Ioanițescu (8 January – 10 February 1938)

- Minister of Industry and Commerce:

- Ion Gigurtu (29 December 1937 – 10 February 1938)

- Minister of Public Works and Communications:

- Virgil Potârcă (29 December 1937 – 10 February 1938)

- Minister of National Education:

- Ion Petrovici (29 December 1937 – 10 February 1938)

- Minister of Religious Affairs and the Arts:

- Ioan Lupaș (29 December 1937 – 10 February 1938)

- Minister of Labour:

- Gheorghe A. Cuza (29 December 1937 – 10 February 1938)

- Minister of Health and Social Security

- Gheorghe Banu (29 December 1937 – 10 February 1938)

- Minister of Cooperation:

- Stan Ghițescu (29 December 1937 – 10 February 1938)

- Ministers of State:

- Alexandru C. Cuza (29 December 1937 – 10 February 1938)
- Silviu Dragomir (29 December 1937 – 10 February 1938)

Preceded by Fourth Tătărăscu cabinet	Cabinet of Romania; 29 December 1937 – 10 February 1938	Succeeded by First Cristea cabinet
