= Călinescu cabinet =

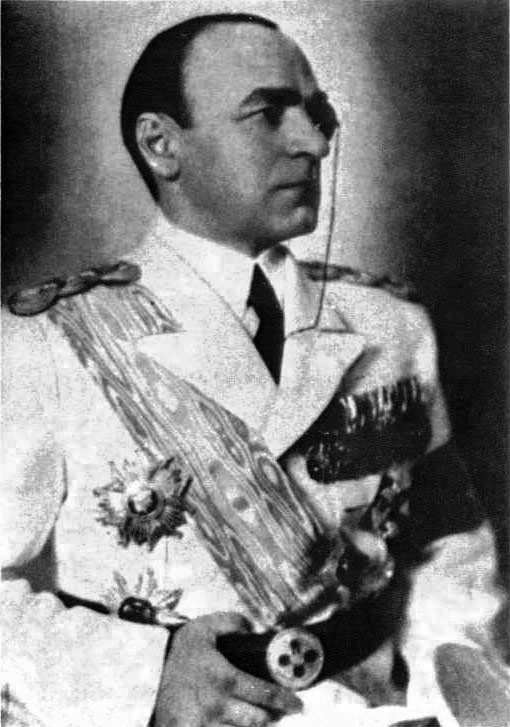
Armand Călinescu

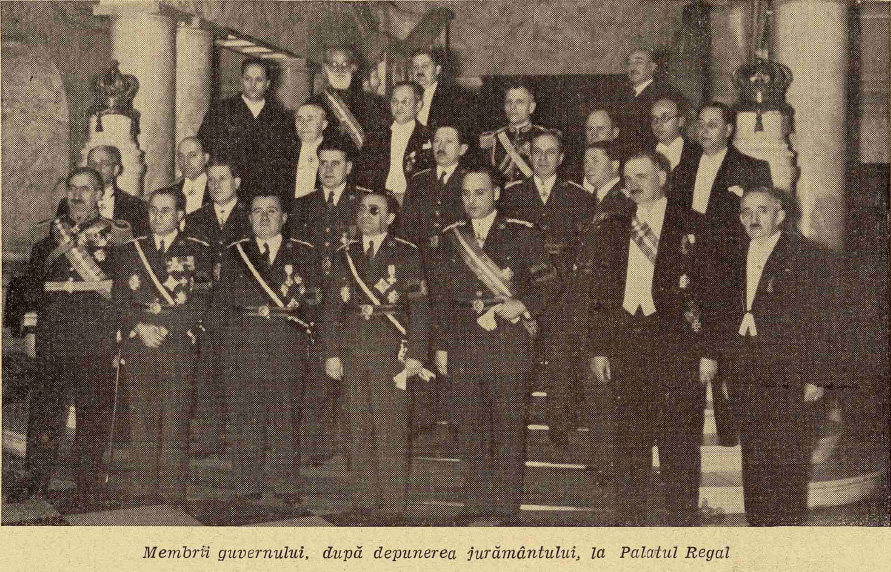
Călinescu cabinet

The cabinet of Armand Călinescu was the government of Romania from 6 March to 21 September 1939. Călinescu was assassinated on 21 September 1939.

== Composition ==
The ministers of the cabinet were as follows:

- President of the Council of Ministers:

- Armand Călinescu (6 March - 21 September 1939)

- Minister of the Interior:

- Armand Călinescu (6 March - 21 September 1939)

- Minister of Foreign Affairs:

- Grigore Gafencu (6 March - 21 September 1939)

- Minister of Finance:

- Mitiță Constantinescu (6 March - 21 September 1939)

- Minister of Justice:

- Victor Iamandi (6 March - 21 September 1939)

- Minister of National Defence:

- (interim) Armand Călinescu (6 March - 21 September 1939)

- Minister of Air and Marine:

- Gen. Paul Teodorescu (6 March - 21 September 1939)

- Minister of Materiel:

- Victor Slăvescu (6 March - 21 September 1939)

- Minister of National Economy:

- Ion Bujoiu (6 March - 21 September 1939)

- Minister of Agriculture and Property

- Nicolae Cornățeanu (6 March - 21 September 1939)

- Minister of Public Works and Communications:

- Mihail Ghelmegeanu (6 March - 21 September 1939)

- Minister of National Education:

- Petre Andrei (6 March - 21 September 1939)

- Minister of Religious Affairs and the Arts:

- Nicolae Zigre (6 March - 21 September 1939)

- Minister of Labour:

- Mihail Ralea (6 March - 21 September 1939)

- Minister of Health and Social Security

- Gen. Nicolae Marinescu (6 March - 21 September 1939)

- Minister of State for Minorities:

- Silviu Dragomir (6 March - 21 September 1939)

Preceded by Third Cristea cabinet	Cabinet of Romania; 6 March 1939 - 21 September 1939	Succeeded by Argeșanu cabinet
