= Fourth Tătărăscu cabinet =

Government of Romania from November to December 1937

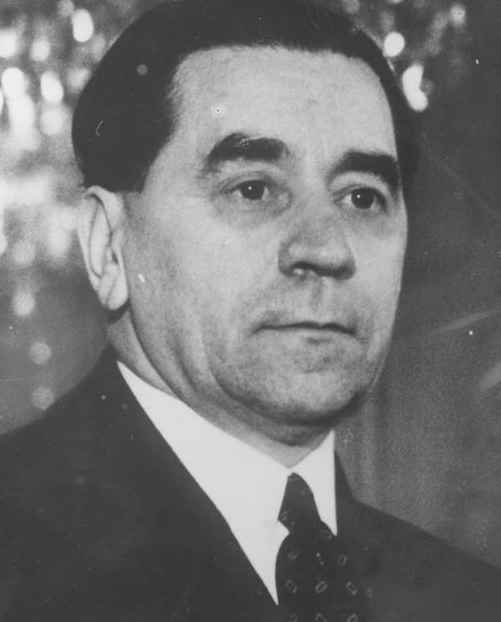
Gheorghe Tătărăscu

The fourth cabinet of Gheorghe Tătărăscu was the government of Romania from 17 November to 28 December 1937.

== Composition ==
The ministers of the cabinet were as follows:

- President of the Council of Ministers:

- Gheorghe Tătărăscu (17 November - 28 December 1937)

- Minister of the Interior:

- Richard Franasovici (17 November - 28 December 1937)

- Minister of Foreign Affairs:

- Victor Antonescu (17 November - 28 December 1937)

- Minister of Finance:

- Mircea Cancicov (17 November - 28 December 1937)

- Minister of Justice:

- Vasile P. Sassu (17 November - 28 December 1937)

- Minister of National Defence:

- Gen. Constantin Ilasievici (17 November - 28 December 1937)

- Minister of Air and Marine:

- Radu Irimescu (17 November - 28 December 1937)

- Minister of Agriculture and Property

- Gheorghe Ionescu-Sisești (17 November - 28 December 1937)

- Minister of Industry and Commerce:

- Ion Bujoiu (17 November - 28 December 1937)

- Minister of Public Works and Communications:

- Ion Inculeț (17 November - 28 December 1937)

- Minister of National Education:

- Constantin Angelescu (17 November - 28 December 1937)

- Minister of Religious Affairs and the Arts:

- Victor Iamandi (17 November - 28 December 1937)

- Minister of Labour:

- Ion Nistor (17 November - 28 December 1937)

- Minister of Health and Social Security

- Ion Costinescu (17 November - 28 December 1937)

- Minister of Cooperation:

- Mihail Negură (17 November - 28 December 1937)

- Ministers of State:

- Valeriu Pop (17 November - 28 December 1937)
- Ion Manolescu-Strunga (17 November - 28 December 1937)

Preceded by Third Tătărăscu cabinet	Cabinet of Romania; 17 November 1937 - 28 December 1937	Succeeded by Goga cabinet
