= Third Cristea cabinet =

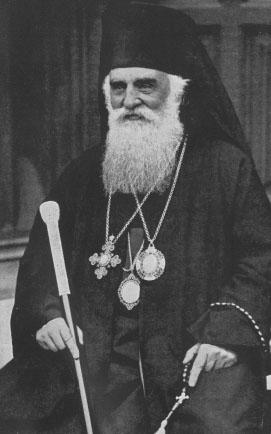
Miron Cristea

The third cabinet of Miron Cristea was the government of Romania from 1 February to 6 March 1939. Miron Cristea was the Patriarch of the Romanian Orthodox Church since 1925. Cristea died on 6 March 1939.

== Composition ==
The ministers of the cabinet were as follows:

- President of the Council of Ministers:

- Miron Cristea (1 February - 6 March 1939)

- Vice President of the Council of Ministers and Minister of the Interior:

- Armand Călinescu (1 February - 6 March 1939)

- Minister of Foreign Affairs:

- Grigore Gafencu (1 February - 6 March 1939)

- Minister of Finance:

- Mitiță Constantinescu (1 February - 6 March 1939)

- Minister of Justice:

- Victor Iamandi (1 February - 6 March 1939)

- Minister of National Defence:

- (interim) Armand Călinescu (1 February - 6 March 1939)

- Minister of Air and Marine:

- Gen. Paul Teodorescu (1 February - 6 March 1939)

- Minister of Materiel:

- Victor Slăvescu (1 February - 6 March 1939)

- Minister of National Economy:

- Ion Bujoiu (1 February - 6 March 1939)

- Minister of Agriculture and Property

- Nicolae Cornățeanu (1 February - 6 March 1939)

- Minister of Public Works and Communications:

- Mihail Ghelmegeanu (1 February - 6 March 1939)

- Minister of National Education:

- Petre Andrei (1 February - 6 March 1939)

- Minister of Religious Affairs and the Arts:

- Nicolae Zigre (1 February - 6 March 1939)

- Minister of Labour:

- Mihail Ralea (1 February - 6 March 1939)

- Minister of Health and Social Security

- Gen. Nicolae Marinescu (1 February - 6 March 1939)

- Minister of State for Minorities:

- Silviu Dragomir (1 February - 6 March 1939)

Preceded by Second Cristea cabinet	Cabinet of Romania; 1 February 1939 - 6 March 1939	Succeeded by Călinescu cabinet
