= Second Cristea cabinet =

Government of Romania

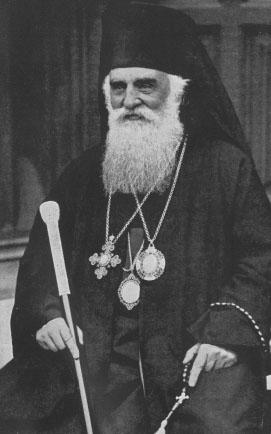
Miron Cristea

The second cabinet of Miron Cristea was the government of Romania from 31 March 1938 to 31 January 1939. Miron Cristea was the Patriarch of the Romanian Orthodox Church since 1925.

== Composition ==
The ministers of the cabinet were as follows:

- President of the Council of Ministers:

- Miron Cristea (31 March 1938 – 31 January 1939)

- Minister of the Interior:

- Armand Călinescu (31 March 1938 – 31 January 1939)

- Minister of Foreign Affairs:

- Nicolae Petrescu-Comnen (31 March – 23 December 1938)
- Grigore Gafencu (23 December 1938 – 31 January 1939)

- Minister of Finance:

- Mircea Cancicov (31 March 1938 – 31 January 1939)

- Minister of Justice:

- Victor Iamandi (31 March 1938 – 31 January 1939)

- Minister of National Defence:

- Gen. Gheorghe Argeșanu (31 March – 14 October 1938)
- Gen. Nicolae Ciupercă (14 October 1938 – 31 January 1939)

- Minister of Air and Marine:

- Gen. Paul Teodorescu (31 March 1938 – 31 January 1939)

- Minister of Materiel:

- Gen. Iosif Iacobici (31 March 1938 – 31 January 1939)

- Minister of Industry and Commerce:

- Mitiță Constantinescu (31 March 1938 – 31 January 1939)

- Minister of Agriculture, Property, and Cooperation:

- Gheorghe Ionescu-Sisești (31 March 1938 – 31 January 1939)

- Minister of Public Works and Communications:

- Mihail Ghelmegeanu (31 March 1938 – 31 January 1939)

- Minister of National Education:

- Bishop Nicolae Colan (31 March – 20 June 1938)
- (interim) Armand Călinescu (20 June – 5 December 1938)
- Petre Andrei (5 December 1938 – 31 January 1939)

- Minister of Religious Affairs and the Arts:

- Bishop Nicolae Colan (31 March 1938 – 31 January 1939)

- Minister of Labour:

- Mihail Ralea (31 March 1938 – 31 January 1939)

- Minister of Health and Social Security:

- (interim) Armand Călinescu (31 March – 4 April 1938)
- Gen. Nicolae Marinescu (4 April 1938 – 31 January 1939)

Preceded by First Cristea cabinet	Cabinet of Romania; 31 March 1938 - 31 January 1939	Succeeded by Third Cristea cabinet
