= Ion Petrovici =

Romanian academic and politician

- Born: June 14, 1882; Tecuci, Kingdom of Romania
- Died: February 17, 1972 (aged 89); Bucharest, Socialist Republic of Romania
- Burial place: Bellu Cemetery, Bucharest
- Citizenship: Romanian
- Parent(s): Ortansa and Dumitru Petrovici

Academic background
- Education: University of Bucharest
- Thesis: Psychological-physical parallelism (1905)

Academic work
- Discipline: Philosopher
- Institutions: University of Iași

Minister of National Education
- In office 29 December 1937 – 10 February 1938
- Prime Minister: Octavian Goga
- Preceded by: Constantin Angelescu
- Succeeded by: Victor Iamandi

Minister of Culture and Religious Affairs
- In office 5 December 1941 – 23 August 1944
- Prime Minister: Ion Antonescu
- Preceded by: Ion Antonescu
- Succeeded by: Ion Boițeanu

Ion (Ioan) Petrovici (June 14, 1882 – February 17, 1972) was a Romanian professor of philosophy at the University of Iași and titular member of the Romanian Academy. He served as Minister of National Education in the Goga cabinet and Minister of Culture and Religious Affairs in the Third Antonescu cabinet.

== Biography ==
=== Education ===
Petrovici was born in 1882, in Tecuci, the son of Dumitru and Ortansa Petrovici, and the grandchild of Junimist poet Theodor Șerbănescu's sister. Between 1892 and 1899 he attended secondary school at Saint Sava College in Bucharest.

He enrolled at the Faculty of Letters and Philosophy of the University of Bucharest in autumn 1899, having Titu Maiorescu and Nicolae Iorga as teachers. He proposed his rhymed play O sărutare to the National Theatre of Bucharest during the same autumn. As Ion Luca Caragiale commended it, the play was performed on 21 March 1900. (He later became a board member of the National Theatre.) As a member of a student delegation representing the University of Bucharest, Petrovici participated in the commemoration of the 400th anniversary of Stephen the Great's death, which took place in the then Austrian town of Suceava in summer 1904. He graduated in philosophy in 1904, with the dissertation O problemă de filosofie (A Philosophy Problem), and became the first home-grown Romanian Doctor of Philosophy in June 1905, with the PhD thesis Paralelismul psiho-fizic (Psychological-physical Parallelism). Petrovici attended philosophy classes by Wilhelm Wundt and Hans Volkelt at Leipzig University and by Friedrich Paulsen, Wilhelm Dilthey, and Alois Riehl at the University of Berlin during the academic year 1905–1906.

=== Academic career ===
He was appointed lecturer at the Philosophy Department of the University of Iași in November 1906 and professor in 1912. He served as Dean of the Faculty of Letters and Philosophy in Iași between 1923 and 1926. He was a visiting professor at the University of Paris and the Académie des Sciences Morales et Politiques in Paris at the end of January 1932, where he lectured on La Nationalité en Philosophie and L'Idée de néant. He collaborated with André Lalande and Paul Gaultier. He was elected corresponding member of the Romanian Academy in 1927 and titular member in 1934; his acceptance speech, delivered on 28 May 1935, was on "Alexandru Philippide and the evolution of Romanian culture".

He contributed to philosophy with his research in Logic regarding the theory of notions and with his metaphysical conception, which connects faith to reason. He contributed to prestigious philosophy journals in France and Germany and chaired international congresses.

=== Political career ===
As a member of Octavian Goga's antisemitic government (December 1937–February 1938), Petrovici planned to restrict the access of Jewish students to universities (the so-called numerus clausus) and decided that Romanian language, history, and geography teachers be only ethnic Romanians. From December 1941 to August 1944 he served as Minister of Culture and Religious Affairs in Ion Antonescu's government, organizing an intergovernmental agency that coordinated the deportation of Jewish converts.

=== Later years ===
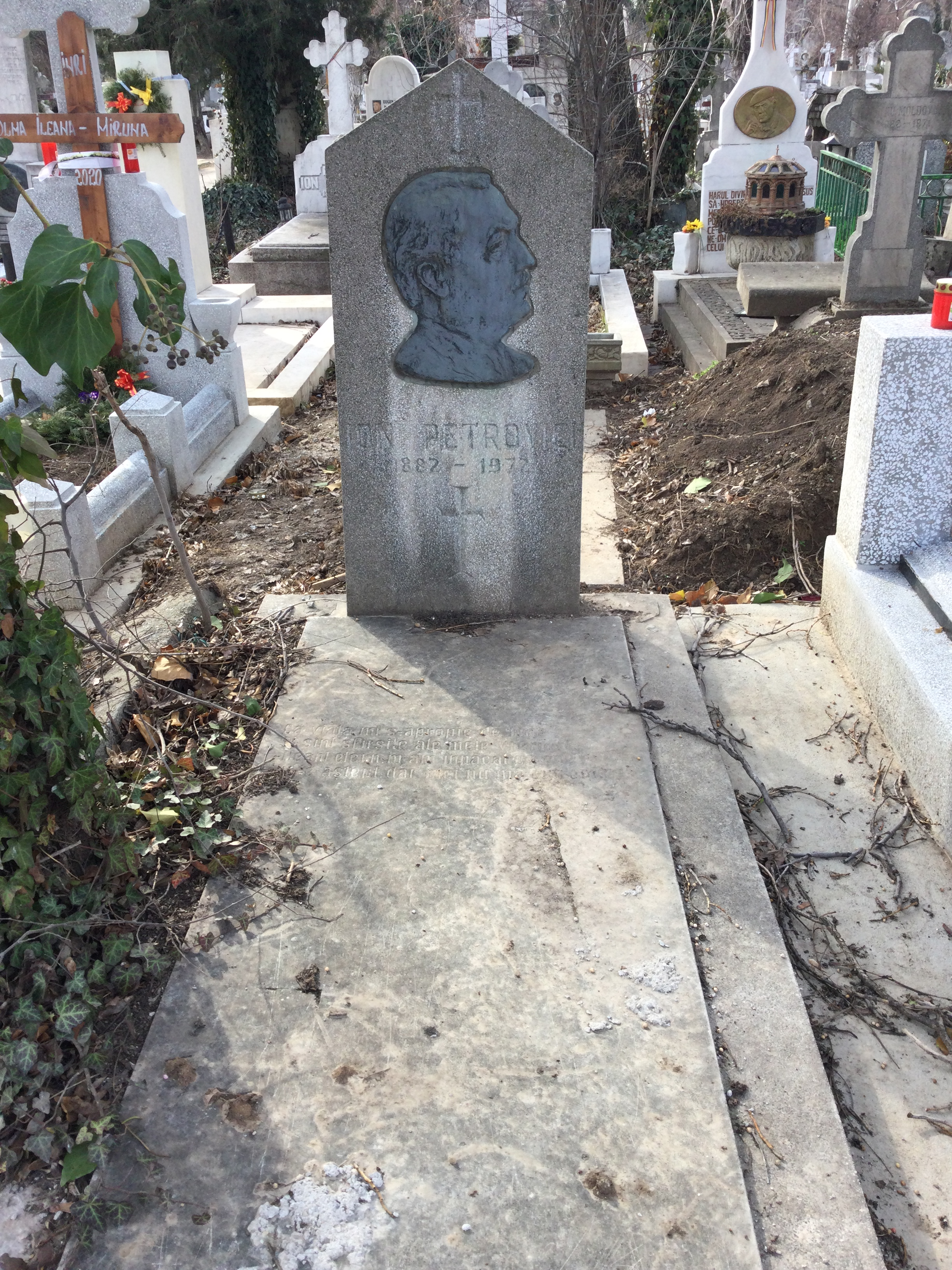
Grave at Bellu Cemetery

He was arrested in 1948 following the advent of the Communist regime and sentenced to 10 years of hard labour for his participation in the Antonescu government. After serving his sentence at Aiud and Râmnicu Sărat prisons, he was deported to the Bărăgan in 1958. Petrovici died in Bucharest in 1972 and was buried in the city's Bellu Cemetery. A street in Tecuci and a school in Cosmești, Galați are named after him.

On October 26, 1998, the High Court of Cassation and Justice rejected the request to extend the annulment appeal, made by the Chief Prosecutor, Sorin Moisescu, in favor of Petrovici and several other member of the Antonescu cabinet who had been sentenced to between two and ten years of hard prison under the charges of war crimes, subordinating the national economy to fascism, and high treason.

== Selected writings ==
=== Philosophical writings (in Romanian) ===
- Paralelismul psiho-fizic (Psychological-physical Parallelism, 1905)
- Rolul și însemnătatea filosofiei (The Purpose and Importance of Philosophy, 1907)
- Teoria noțiunilor. Studii de logică (Theory of Notions. Studies in Logics, 1910)
- Introducere în metafizică (Introduction to Metaphysics, 1924)
- Teoria noțiunilor [Theory of Notions] (2nd ed.). București: Tipografia "Jockey-Club" Ion C. Văcărescu. 1925. OCLC 933400418.
- Studii istorico-filosofice (Historical-philosophical Studies, 1925)
- Viața și opera lui Kant [The Life and Work of Kant]. București: Casa școalelor. 1936. OCLC 250812488.
- Schopenhauer. București: Editura Librăriei "Universala" Alcalay. 1937. OCLC 935634402.
- Scrieri istorico-filosofice (Historical-philosophical Writings, 1943)
- Petrovici, I. (1931). Titu Maiorescu 1840–1917 . București, Romania: Tiparul Ion C. Văcărescu, Strada Umbrei, 4.
- Petrovici, I. (1940). La Centenarul lui Titu Maiorescu (At The Centennial of Titu Maiorescu). In Academia Româna, Memoriile Sectiei Literare, seria III, Tomul IX, Mem II. Monitorul Oficial și Imprimeriile Statului. București, Romania: Imprimeria Națională.
- Petrovici, I. (1966). De-a lungul unei vieți (Over a lifetime). București, Romania: Editura pentru Literatură.
- Petrovici, I. (1966). Kant. Viața și opera (Kant. Life and work). București, Romania: Eurosong-Book.
- Petrovici, I. (1997). Schopenhauer. Monografie istorico-filozofică (Schopenhauer. Historico-philosophical monograph). București, Romania: Eurosong-Book.

=== Philosophical writings (in other languages) ===
- Kant und das rumänische Denken (1927)
- La nationalité en philosophie (1932)
- Réflexions sur l'inconséquence (1934)
- La connaissance humaine et le transcendent (1937)
- La philosophie du compromis (1937)

=== Literary writings ===
- Raite prin țară (Wandering through the Country, 1926)
- Impresii din Italia (Impressions of Italy, 1930)
- Deasupra zbuciumului (Above Distress, 1932)
- Rotocoale de lumină (Circles of Light, 1934)
- Figuri dispărute (Missing Shapes, 1937)
- Prin meandrele trecutului. Evocări inedite [Through Meanderings of the Past. New Recollections]. with Mihai Gafița. București: Cartea Românească. 1979. OCLC 895214417. (posthumous)
- Însemnări de drum (Travel Notes, 1983, posthumous)

== Bibliography ==
- Brădățan, Costică; Ianoși, Ion (2000). O introducere la istoria filosofiei românești în secolul XX [An introduction to the history of Romanian philosophy in the 20th century] (in Romanian). București: Editura Fundației culturale române. p. 36. ISBN 973-577-293-0. OCLC 48915820.
- Cazan, Gheorghe A. (2004). Dincoace de Maiorescu [Beyond Maiorescu] (in Romanian). București: Editura Agerpress Typo. pp. 326, 335. ISBN 9738429099. OCLC 163636403.
- Ianoși, Ion (1996). O Istorie a Filosofiei Românesti (A History of Romanian Philosophy) (pp. 127–128). Cluj–Napoca, Romania: Editura Apostrof
- Necula, Ionel (2005). Ion Petrovici în vizorul securității [Ion Petrovici in the sights of the Securitate] (in Romanian). București: Editura Saeculum I.O. OCLC 891647100.
- Necula, Ionel (2006). Ion Petrovici: un capitol de filosofie românească: correspondență Pamfil Șeicaru–Ion Petrovici [Ion Petrovici: a chapter of Romanian philosophy The correspondence Pamfil Șeicaru–Ion Petrovici] (in Romanian). București: Ideea Europeană. ISBN 973-7691-27-X. OCLC 176116556.
