= First Cristea cabinet =

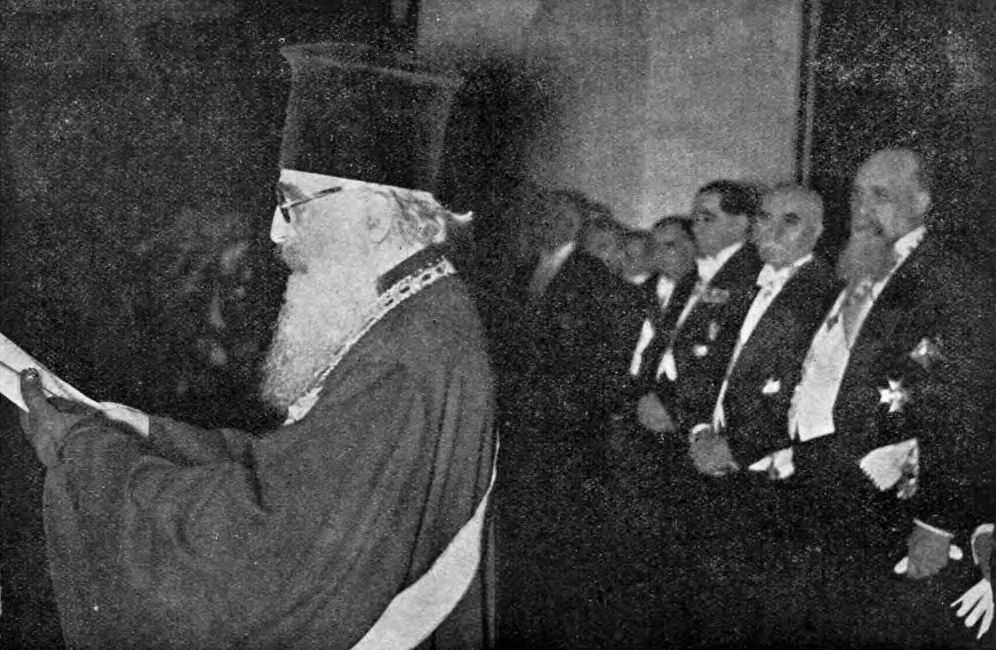
Prime minister Miron Cristea announces the new constitution. In the background Gheorghe Tatarescu is standing between the other ministers.

The first cabinet of Miron Cristea was the government of Romania from 10 February to 31 March 1938. Miron Cristea was the Patriarch of the Romanian Orthodox Church since 1925.

== Composition ==
The ministers of the cabinet were as follows:

- President of the Council of Ministers:

- Miron Cristea (10 February – 31 March 1938)

- Minister of the Interior:

- Armand Călinescu (10 February – 31 March 1938)

- Minister of Foreign Affairs:

- (interim) Gheorghe Tătărescu (10 February – 31 March 1938)

- Minister of Finance:

- Mircea Cancicov (10 February – 31 March 1938)

- Minister of Justice:

- (interim) Mircea Cancicov (10 February – 31 March 1938)

- Minister of National Defence:

- Gen. Ion Antonescu (10 February – 31 March 1938)

- Minister of Air and Marine:

- (interim) Gen. Ion Antonescu (10 February – 31 March 1938)

- Minister of Agriculture, Property, and Cooperation

- Gheorghe Ionescu-Sisești (10 February – 31 March 1938)

- Minister of Industry and Commerce:

- Constantin Argetoianu (10 February – 31 March 1938)

- Minister of Public Works and Communications:

- Constantin Angelescu (10 February – 31 March 1938)

- Minister of National Education:

- Victor Iamandi (10 February – 31 March 1938)

- Minister of Religious Affairs and the Arts:

- (interim) Victor Iamandi (10 February – 31 March 1938)

- Minister of Labour:

- Voicu Nițescu (10 February – 31 March 1938)

- Minister of Health and Social Security:

- Ioan Emil Costinescu (10 February – 31 March 1938)

- Minister of Cooperation:

- Stan Ghițescu (10 February – 31 March 1938)

- Ministers of State:

- Armand Călinescu (10 February – 31 March 1938)
- Gheorghe Tătărăscu (10 February – 31 March 1938)
- Mircea Cancicov (10 February – 31 March 1938)
- Constantin Argetoianu (10 February – 31 March 1938)
- Constantin Angelescu (10 February – 31 March 1938)
- Marshal Alexandru Averescu (10 February – 31 March 1938)
- Gen. Artur Văitoianu (10 February – 31 March 1938)
- Alexandru Vaida-Voevod (10 February – 31 March 1938)
- Gheorghe Mironescu (10 February – 31 March 1938)
- Nicolae Iorga (10 February – 31 March 1938)

Preceded by Goga cabinet	Cabinet of Romania; 10 February 1938 - 31 March 1938	Succeeded by Second Cristea cabinet
