= Simona Sharoni =

Feminist scholar and activist

- סימונה שרוני
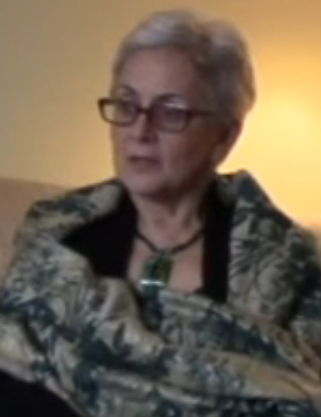
- Sharoni in 2017
- Born: 1961; Tecuci, Romanian People's Republic

Academic background
- Education: Haifa University; George Mason University
- Thesis: Conflict resolution through feminist lenses: theorizing the Israeli-Palestinian conflict from the perspective of women peace activists in Israel (1993)

Academic work
- Institutions: Merrimack College; State University of New York at Plattsburgh; Evergreen State College; American University
- Main interests: Gender and Women’s Studies
- Website: simonasharoni.com

Simona Sharoni (Hebrew: סימונה שרוני; born 1961) is a feminist scholar and activist who is currently Professor of Women's and Gender Studies at Merrimack College.

== Early life and education ==
Sharoni was born in Tecuci, Romania in 1961. She immigrated with her parents to Israel in 1963. She earned an M.A. degree in Counseling from Haifa University. In 1989 she moved to the United States to pursue doctoral studies, and holds a Ph.D. in Conflict Analysis and Resolution from George Mason University.

== Career ==
Sharoni taught at Haifa University in Israel, American University in Washington, D.C., the Evergreen State College and Saint Martin's University in Olympia, Washington. She also held appointments at the University of Oregon in Eugene and at the University of Cincinnati.

She studies and writes extensively on the subjects of Gender in Israel and Palestine, women in time of war, feminist solidarity, men and masculinities, women's movements, transnational feminism, college sexual assault.

She is a supporter of the Boycott, Divestment and Sanctions movement.

== Victim blaming in Israel-Palestine ==
Sharoni, who served in the Israeli military, supports the Boycott, Divestment and Sanctions movement and an academic boycott of Israel. In her academic work, she compared victim blaming in rape cases to public attitudes about Palestinians.

"This is the assumption that Palestinians basically bring the violence on themselves. It’s similar to telling the survivor that it’s what she was wearing, that she gave mixed messages," Sharoni said. "For example, ‘They didn’t agree to the partition, they’ve rejected attempts to make peace, they elected for Hamas …’ There's no responsibility and no accountability for the perpetrator of violence, even though that perpetrator is breaking international law."

"In addition to blaming the victim, Palestinians are not believed, which is the same with survivors. ‘They’re exaggerating, it’s not that bad, because Israel is a democracy.’ It's actually very similar to saying, ‘No, he’s actually a nice guy,’ about a man accused of rape."

== Works ==
Sharoni has written two books: Gender and The Israeli-Palestinian Conflict: The Politics of Women's Resistance. New York: Syracuse University Press, 1995. and La Logica Della Pace (The Logic of Peace). Torino, Italy: Edizioni Gruppo Abele, 1997 (in Italian). Sharoni is also co-editor (with Julia Welland, Linda Steiner, and Jennifer Pedersen) of ' 'The Handbook on Gender and War' '. London: Edward Elgar Publishing, Inc, 2016.

Sharoni has also written many journal articles book chapters, and other publications, presenting the results of her research. These have been widely discussed by other sociologists, historians, political analysts and feminist writers.

== Lingerie joke incident ==
On April 5, 2018, while attending the annual conference of the International Studies Association (ISA), Richard Ned Lebow, a Professor at King's College London and Sharoni were on a crowded elevator when someone in the elevator offered to press their floor buttons; in response, Lebow jokingly answered, "ladies’ lingerie."

Following that, Sharoni filed a complaint against him, arguing that his use of sexual innuendo in a public space at an academic conference was a violation of ISA's Code of Conduct. An ISA committee found him in violation of its Code of Conduct and asked him to apologize to Sharoni.

Following the complaint, Lebow sent an e-mail to Sharoni explaining the context of his remark. In his e-mail he explained that in large department stores in the 1940s and 1950s there were lift operators that would request which department the customers wanted and it had become a standard gag line to reply "ladies' lingerie" when someone asked which floor you wanted.

Lebow indicated that he will not apologize. Initial media coverage reported Sharoni's action as an example of political correctness. Columnist Ruth Marcus of The Washington Post sided with Lebow. "Let’s maintain some sense of proportion and civility," she said. Not every offensive comment was intended that way, and Sharoni should have checked with Lebow before bringing a disciplinary procedure, said Marcus. Marcus also quoted an email from Sharoni saying that “political correctness” was nothing more than a "blanket excuse by those who refuse to rethink and change their racist, sexist and homophobic beliefs and practices. From inappropriate jokes in public spaces to unwanted sexual advances and assault, men in positions of power are outraged when they are being held accountable, even if the sanction is as minor as a request for an apology." Of more than 2,300 comments on Marcus's story about the incident, the vast majority condemned Sharoni.

The incident went public. Sharoni said that in response, she had received hate mail, and that this was an example of "the impact on women and other marginalized groups" who witness abuse, and would discourage them from speaking up, even if they follow written policy and even if they are right. Lebow said that Sharoni and ISA should have tried to resolve the matter informally, since "international relations scholars know that dialogue is the first step in addressing conflict and coercion the last. Yet, ISA went right to coercion at the outset."
