= Tigveni =

- Commune
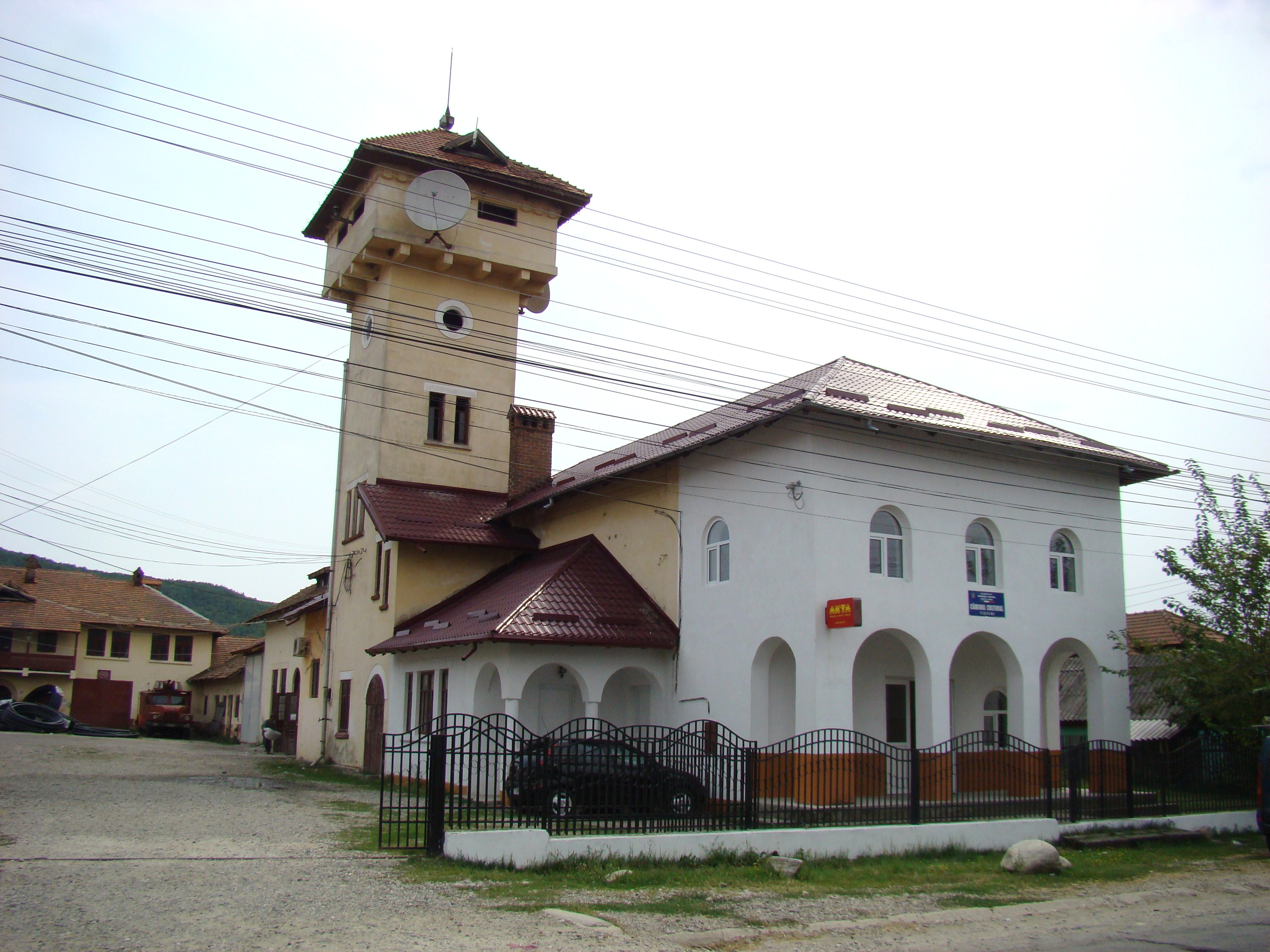
- Tigveni community center

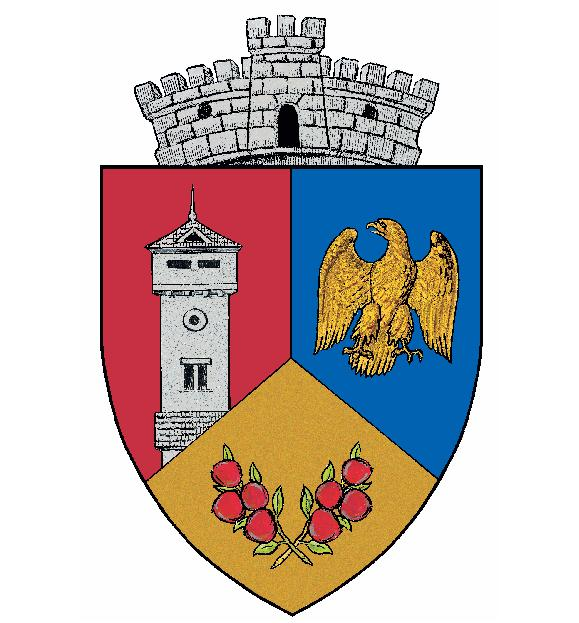
- Coat of arms

- Location in Romania
- Coordinates: 44°44′N 25°9′E
- Country: Romania
- County: Argeș

Government
  - Mayor (2020–2024): Constantin Smeu (PNL)
- Area: 49.34 km^{2} (19.05 sq mi)
- Elevation: 405 m (1,329 ft)
- Population (2021-12-01): 3,197
  - Density: 64.80/km^{2} (167.8/sq mi)
- Time zone: UTC+02:00 (EET)
  - Summer (DST): UTC+03:00 (EEST)
- Postal code: 117740
- Vehicle reg.: AG
- Website: www.cjarges.ro/en/web/tigveni

Tigveni is a commune in Argeș County, Muntenia, Romania. It is composed of eight villages: Bădislava, Bălilești, Bălteni, Bârseștii de Jos, Bârseștii de Sus, Blaju, Tigveni, and Vlădești.

The commune is located in the northwestern part of the county, on the border with Vâlcea County. It is crossed by national road DN73C, which connects Câmpulung, Curtea de Argeș, and Râmnicu Vâlcea.

== Natives ==
- Gabriel Marinescu (1886–1940), general
- Nicolae Marinescu (1884–1963), doctor, general, politician
