= Dumitru Iuca =

Romanian politician (1882–1940)

Dumitru Iuca (March 7, 1882 – November 27, 1940) was a Romanian politician.

Born in Giurgiu, he studied law in university before practicing as a lawyer with the Vlașca County bar. Entering the National Liberal Party (PNL), Iuca was named prefect of Vlașca in 1914, and also served as mayor of his hometown. In 1919, he was elected to the Assembly of Deputies. In the 1930s, he formed part of a relatively younger faction within the PNL, alongside Gheorghe Tătărescu, Victor Iamandi, Ion Inculeț, Richard Franasovici and Valer Pop. This clashed with the older wing led by Dinu Brătianu and was eventually driven to join the camarilla surrounding King Carol II.

Iuca was deputy state secretary in the Interior Ministry from November 1933 to August 1936. This period was marked by violent clashes between the government and the Iron Guard, culminating with the latter's assassination of Prime Minister Ion G. Duca at the end of 1933 and the repression that followed. Iuca was part of the ministerial apparatus tasked with maintaining order. In August 1936, in a cabinet led by Tătărescu, he was promoted to Interior Minister, serving until the following February.

As minister, Iuca oversaw measures to consolidate police forces in order to better face the Guardist threat. However, despite their breach of a provision in the 1923 Constitution that barred unauthorized service in foreign armies, he helped facilitate the funerals of Ion Moța and Vasile Marin, arranging for a special funeral train outside the normal schedule. Moreover, he was obliged to deal with separatism by Hungarian, Bulgarian, Ukrainian and Russian minorities. After Tătărescu himself took over the ministry, Iuca served as state secretary with ministerial rank but without portfolio. He resigned from this post in early April.

He died in Bucharest in November 1940, during the National Legionary State.
