= Tecuci Town Museum =

Museum in Galați County, Romania

- Muzeul de Istorie „Teodor Cincu", Tecuci
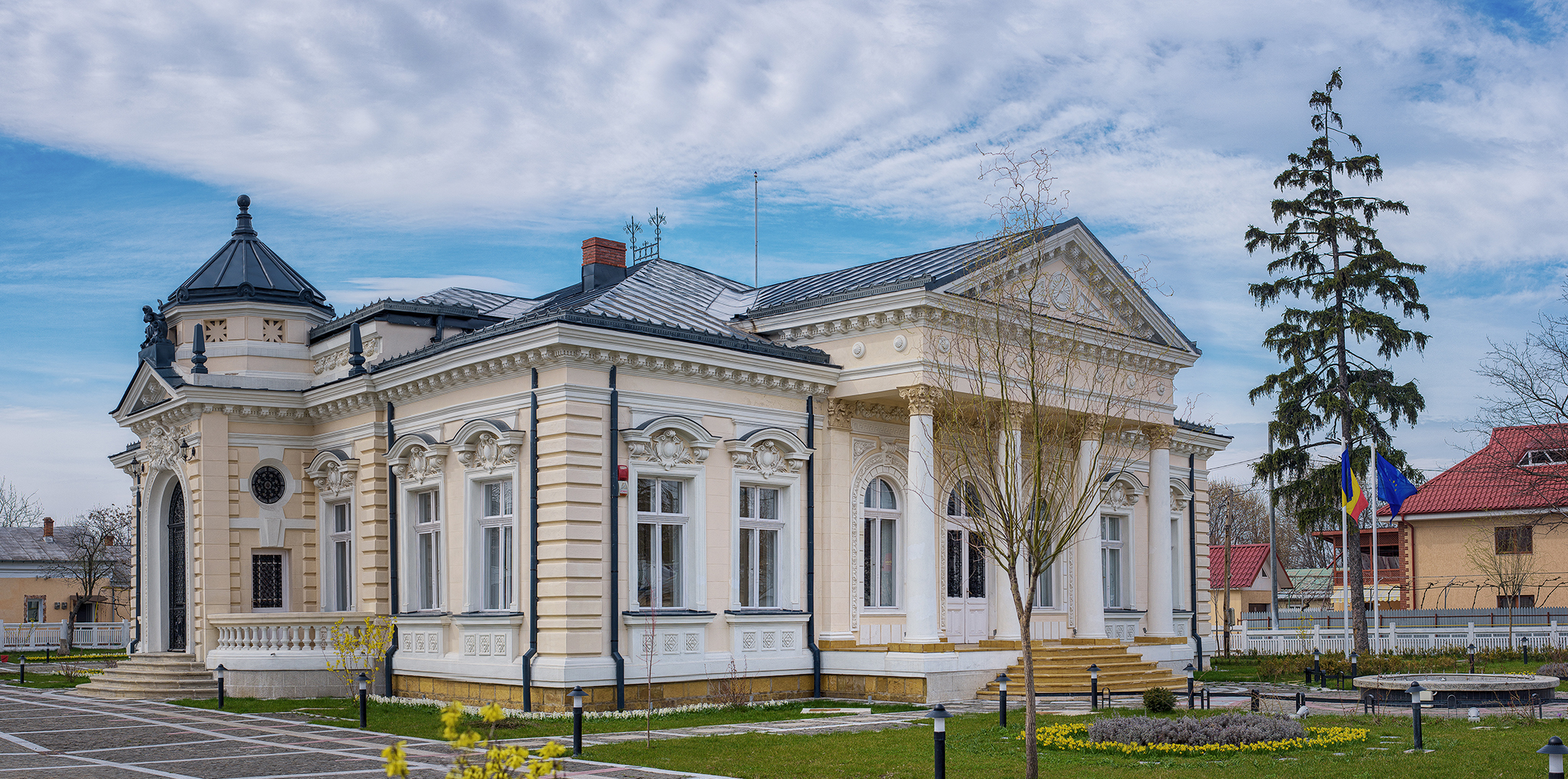
- Tecuci Town Museum
- Location: Romania, Tecuci

The Tecuci Town Museum was established in Tecuci, Romania in 1932 based on the private collections of Mihail Dimitriu and Constantin Solomon, in a building donated by Teodor Cincu.

== History and collections ==
Until 1934, the museum was housed in the building of the local commercial high school. In 1934, the museum acquired the archaeology collection from Mihai Dimitriu, the first custodian of the institution, and a coleoptera collection belonging to Professor Alecu Alesînschi (lost after the 1965 reorganization). In 1974, the museum heritage was enriched by archaeological finds coming from the campaigns of 1926 - 1951 undertaken by Professor Radu Vulpe and Ecaterina Vulpe in the site of Poiana-Nicorești (Piroboridava) until then kept in the deposits of the Bucharest Institute of Archaeology. The present building is a monument of architecture built in the second half of the 19th century. The exhibits include pottery from Neolithic (axes, knives, hand mills, and pottery belonging to Cucuteni and Criș cultures), from the Bronze Age (Monteoru culture pottery), the Iron Age (food vessels); jug bearing god Dionysius' mask, Dacian ornaments and weapons deposits (4th - 3rd centuries BC), the gilded bronze hoard of Callatis (3rd century BC), glass pot bearing a Greek inscription (4th century) etc.

The museum owns goods listed in the National Cultural Heritage Treasure.

The building housing the museum, which dates to the late 19th century, is listed as a historic monument by Romania's Ministry of Culture and Religious Affairs.

== See also ==
- Romanian archaeology
- List of Romanian archaeologists
- Tecuci
- Dacia
