= Richard Ned Lebow =

American political scientist (born 1942)

Richard Ned Lebow FBA
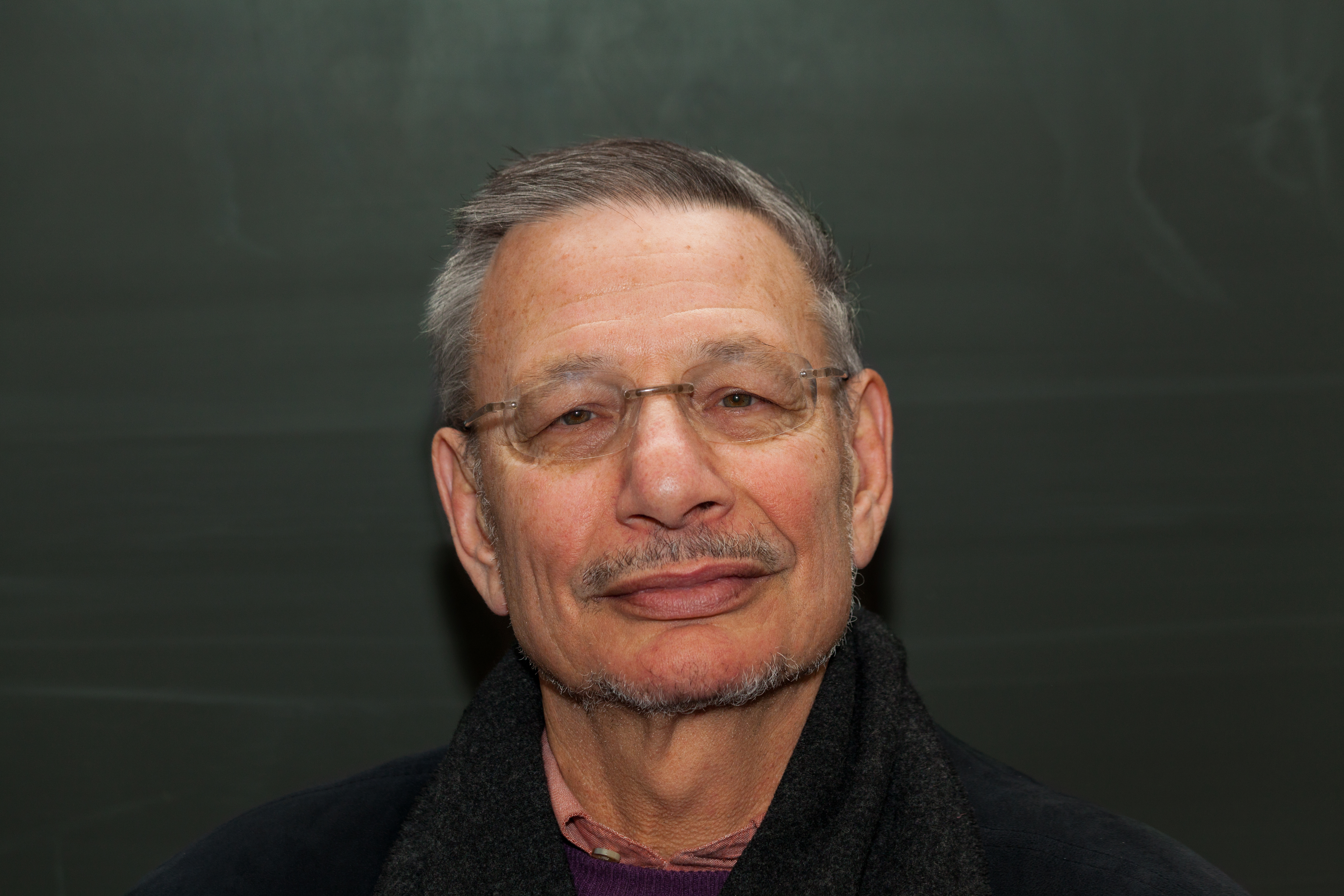
- Lebow in January 2012 at the University of Hamburg
- Born: April 24, 1942 (age 84)

Academic background
- Education: University of Chicago; Yale University; City University of New York
- Thesis: White Britain and Black Ireland: The Anglo-Irish colonial relationship (1968)

Academic work
- Institutions: King's College London; Pembroke College, University of Cambridge
- Main interests: International Political Theory, fiction writing

Richard Ned Lebow FBA is an American political scientist best known for his work in international relations, political psychology, classics, and philosophy of science.

He is Professor Emeritus of International Political Theory at the Department of War Studies, King's College London, Honorary Fellow of Pembroke College, University of Cambridge, and James O. Freedman Presidential Professor Emeritus at Dartmouth College.

Lebow also writes fiction. He has published a novel and a collection of short stories and has recently finished a second novel.

== Early life and education ==
Lebow was born in 1941 in France and was a refugee from Europe, the only member of his family to survive World War II. He was taken to an orphanage before being adopted by an American family and grew up in New York City. He graduated from Lynbrook Senior High School in 1959 in Long Island, New York.

Lebow gained his BA degree from the University of Chicago, his masters from Yale University and his doctorate from City University of New York.

== Career ==
Lebow taught political science, international relations, political psychology, political theory, methodology, public policy at universities in the United States and Europe and strategy at the Naval and National War Colleges. From 2002 until becoming emeritus in 2012, he was James O. Freedman Presidential Professor of Government at Dartmouth College. He taught courses in international relations, political psychology, political theory and Greek literature and philosophy. Since 2012, He has been professor of international political theory in the War Studies department of King’s College London and Bye-Fellow of Pembroke College, University of Cambridge. He taught courses on philosophy of science, scope and methods and ancient Greek conceptions of order and justice.

Lebow has held visiting positions, including:

- Olof Palme Professor, University of Lund, 2011–12
- Centennial Professor of International Relations at the London School of Economics, 2009–11
- Visiting fellow at Pembroke College, University of Cambridge, 2010–11
- Visiting Professor, University of Cambridge, 2008-2011
- Former President of the International Society of Political Psychology
- Onassis Foundation Fellow in Ancient Greek History and Culture
- Overseas Fellow at St John's College, University of Cambridge.

In 2018, Lebow was accused of making an inappropriate joke riding in an elevator during a conference. Simona Sharoni, a feminist scholar and activist, took offense at the joke and reported Lebow to the International Studies Association (ISA). Lebow emailed her to apologize, but said that focusing on minor offenses harms the general fight for women rights. He refused to apologize in the way that the ISA sought from him.

== Analysis ==
Lebow is a realist.

Writing with Benjamin Valentino and critiquing power transition theory, Lebow states, "Power transition theorists have been surprisingly reluctant to engage historical cases in an effort to show that wars between great powers have actually resulted from the motives described by their theories."

== Honours ==
- Honorary Doctorate, Panthéon-Assas University, Paris, France, 2025
- Co-recipient conference grant on the fragility and robustness of political orders, Swedish Foundation of Humanities and Social Sciences, 2020
- Choice Outstanding Academic Title Award, for Avoiding War, Making Peace, 2018
- Honourable Mention, Susan Strange Book Award for the best book of the year in international relations from the British International Studies Association for The Rise and Fall of Political Orders (Cambridge: Cambridge University Press, 2019
- Co-recipient Leverhulme Research Grant (Shakespeare and War), 2018
- Election to the British Academy, 2017
- Honorable Mention, Charles A. Taylor Book Award for the best book in interpretative methodologies and methods, for Causation in International Relations, 2016
- Honorary Doctorate, Panteion University, Athens, Greece, 2015
- Choice Outstanding Academic Title Award, for Toni Erskine and Richard Ned Lebow, Tragedy and International Relations, 2014
- Teaching Excellence Award, King's College London, 2013
- Distinguished Scholar, International Studies Association, 2014
- Alexander L. George Award from the International Society of Political Psychology for the best book of the year (The Politics and Ethics of Identity)
- Honorary Doctorate, American University of Paris, 2013
- Robert Jervis-Paul Schroeder Award for the best book in international history and politics from the American Political Science Association (A Cultural Theory of International Relations), 2009
- Susan Strange Award for the best book international relations from the British International Studies Association (A Cultural Theory of International Relations), 2009

== Fiction ==
- Rough Waters and Other Stories (Ethics International Press, 2022)
- Obsession (murder mystery; Pegasus, 2022)

== Scholarly Books since 2003 ==
- Why Nations Still Fight (Cambridge University Press, 2026)
- Self and Social Fashioning: A Personal Account (Ethics International Press 2025)
- Multiple Selves: Identity, Self-Fashioning and Ethics (Ethics International Press 2024)
- Weimar’s Long Shadow (Cambridge 2024)
- Justice, East and West, and International Order, coauthored with Feng Zhang, (Oxford, 2022)
- Lebow, Richard Ned; Norman, Ludvig, eds. (2022), Robustness and Fragility of Political Orders: Leader Assessments, Responses, and Consequences, OL 28805874W, Wikidata Q119582648
- The Quest for Knowledge in International Relations: How Do We Know? (Cambridge, 2022)
- Reason and Cause: Social Science in a Social World (Cambridge, 2020)
- Between Peace and War: 40th Anniversary Revised Edition (Palgrave-Macmillan, 2020)
- Ethics and International Relations: A Tragic Perspective (Cambridge, 2020)
- Taming Sino-American Rivalry, coauthored with Feng Zhang, (Oxford 2020)
- A Democratic Foreign Policy (Palgrave-Macmillan 2018)
- The Rise and Fall of Political Orders (Cambridge, 2018).
- Lebow, Richard Ned, ed. (2017). Max Weber and International Relations. Cambridge, United Kingdom: Cambridge University Press. ISBN 9781108416382.
- Lebow, Richard Ned (2016). National Identities and International Relations. Cambridge, United Kingdom: Cambridge University Press. ISBN 9781107166301.
- Lebow, Richard Ned; Schouten, Peer; Suganami, Hidemi, eds. (2016). The Return of the Theorists: Dialogues with Great Thinkers in international relations. Houndmills, Basingstoke, Hampshire New York, NY: Palgrave Macmillan. ISBN 9781349577880.
- Lebow, Richard Ned (2016). Brauch, Hans Günther (ed.). Richard Ned Lebow: A Pioneer in International Relations, Theory, History, Political Philosophy and Psychology. New York, New York, USA: Springer International Publishing. ISBN 9783319341491. 4 vols.
- Lebow, Richard Ned (2014). Constructing Cause in International Relations. Cambridge, England: Cambridge University Press. ISBN 9781107047907.
- Lebow, Richard Ned; Reich, Simon (2014). Good-Bye Hegemony! Power and Influence in the Global System. Princeton, New Jersey: Princeton University Press. ISBN 9780691160436.
- Lebow, Richard Ned (2014). Archduke Franz Ferdinand Lives! A World Without World War I. London, England: Palgrave Macmillan. ISBN 9781137278531.
- Lebow, Richard Ned (2012). The Politics and Ethics of Identity: In Search of Ourselves. Cambridge, England: Cambridge University Press. ISBN 9781107027657.
- Lebow, Richard Ned; Erskine, Toni, eds. (2012). Tragedy and international relations. Houndmills, Basingstoke, Hampshire: Palgrave Macmillan. ISBN 9780230237520.
- Lebow, Richard Ned (2010). Why Nations Fight: Past and Future Motives for War. New York: Cambridge University Press. ISBN 9780521170451.
- Lebow, Richard Ned (2010). Forbidden Fruit: Counterfactuals and International Relations. Princeton: Princeton University Press. ISBN 9780691132891.
- Lebow, Richard Ned (2008). A Cultural Theory of International Relations. Cambridge, England: Cambridge University Press. ISBN 9780521871365.

Winner of the Jervis-Schroeder Award (American Political Science Association) for the best book in history and international relations.
Winner of the Susan Strange Award (British International Studies Association) for the best book of the year.

- Lebow, Richard Ned (2013). Coercion, Cooperation, and Ethics in International Relations. New York: Routledge. ISBN 9781135917029.
- Lebow, Richard Ned (2003). The Tragic Vision of Politics : Ethics, Interests, and Orders. Cambridge, England: Cambridge University Press. ISBN 9780521827539.

Winner of the Alexander L. George Award for the best book in political psychology.
