= Emanoil Gojdu =

Romanian lawyer (1802–1870)

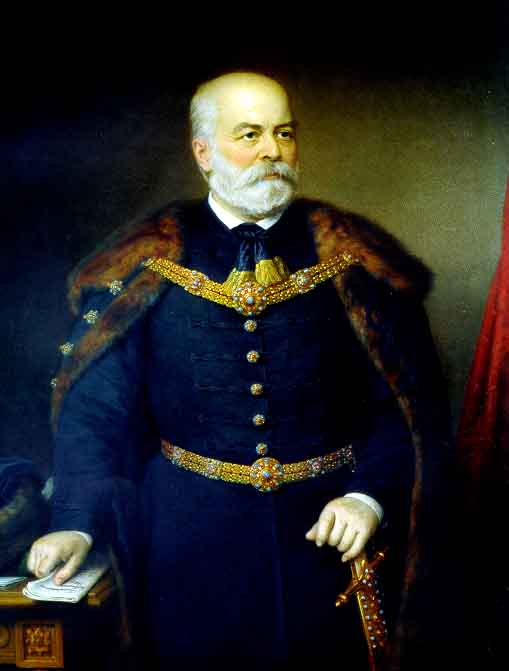
Emanuil Gojdu, painting by Miklós Barabás

Emanuil Gojdu (Hungarian: Gozsdu Emánuel, mostly referred as Gozsdu Manó; 9 February 1802, Nagyvárad, Hungary (now Oradea, Romania)—3 February 1870, Pest-Buda, Hungary) was an ethnically Romanian lawyer in the Kingdom of Hungary, for most of his life part of the Austrian Empire.

Emanuil Gojdu was born to an Aromanian family that originated in Moscopole. He attended high school in his native town. After completing the high school studies, he studied law at the Academy of Law in Oradea (Nagyvárad, 1820–1821), then in Pressburg (/Pozsony) (1821–1822) and Budapest (1822–1824), becoming both a lawyer and a politician in 1824. He was a supporter of the rights of the Romanians in the Kingdom of Hungary and Transylvania.

In his will, dating from 1869, he left his wealth to "the Romanian Orthodox people of Hungary and Transylvania" and it was administered by a foundation which bore his name and functioned between 1870 and 1917, one which awarded thousands of scholarships to Transylvanian Romanians. Among the students who received such scholarships were Traian Vuia, Octavian Goga, Ioan Lupaş, Constantin Daicoviciu, Petru Groza and Victor Babeș.

In 1918, the headquarters of the foundation was moved to Sibiu (Hermannstadt/Nagyszeben) which became part of Romania, although its assets (mostly buildings) remained in Hungary. According to the 247th article of the 1920 Treaty of Trianon, Hungary was supposed to hand over the assets to Romania. However, and despite several agreements between Hungary and Romania in 1924, 1930 and 1937, this was never done.

The assets, consisting mostly of real estate in Budapest and of bank accounts which held the income from the buildings, was confiscated by the Hungarian Communist government in 1952, and in 1990 became the property of Erzsébetváros, the 7th District of the Budapest Municipality. In 1999, the Budapest Municipality leased the buildings to a Hungarian-Cypriot company. The assets are currently estimated to be worth between $812 million and $1.1 billion.

In 2006, an agreement was signed between the two governments, through which the Romanian side would withdraw all claim in favor of a newly established Hungarian-Romanian foundation. However, it is not yet known whether the Romanian parliament would approve this. The Romanian Orthodox Church has made public its disagreement with any such compromise, and warned that it would use all legal means to get the assets, as it claims to be the recipient according to Gojdu's will.
