= Piroboridava =

Dacian fortified settlement

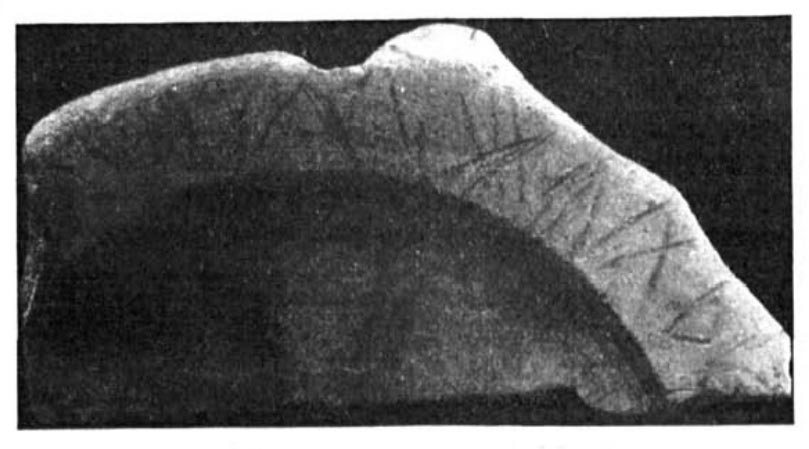
- A fragment of a vase collected by Mihail Dimitriu at the site of Piroboridava (Poiana, Galați, Romania) illustrating the use of Greek and Latin letters by a Dacian potter (source: Dacia journal, 1933)
- Interactive map of Piroboridava
- Location: Cetățuia de la mal, Piroboridava, Poiana, Romania

Monument istoric
- Reference no.: GL-I-s-A-02989

Piroboridava (Ancient Greek: Πιροβορίδαυα) was a Dacian town mentioned by Ptolemy, and archaeologically identified at Poiana, Galați, Romania. The second part name of the city Dacian dava shows significance of the tribal city.

It was rebuilt as a Roman fort around 101 AD in Trajan's Dacian Wars, situated a little below the confluence of the Trotuș and Siret rivers, on the left bank of the Siret, northwest of Poiana village.

== See also ==
- Dacian davae
- List of ancient cities in Thrace and Dacia
- Dacia
- Roman Dacia
