= Tecuci =

- Municipality
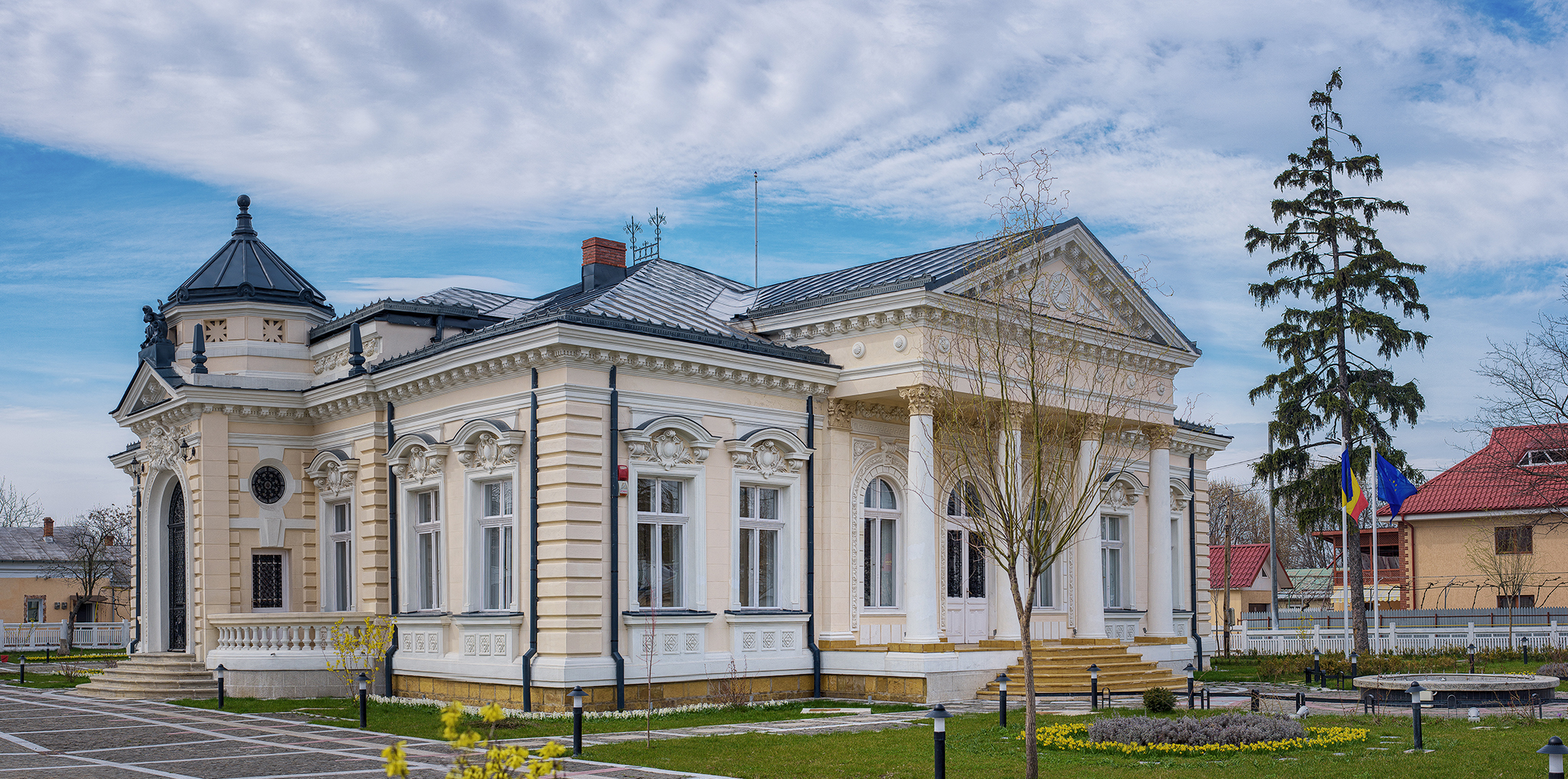
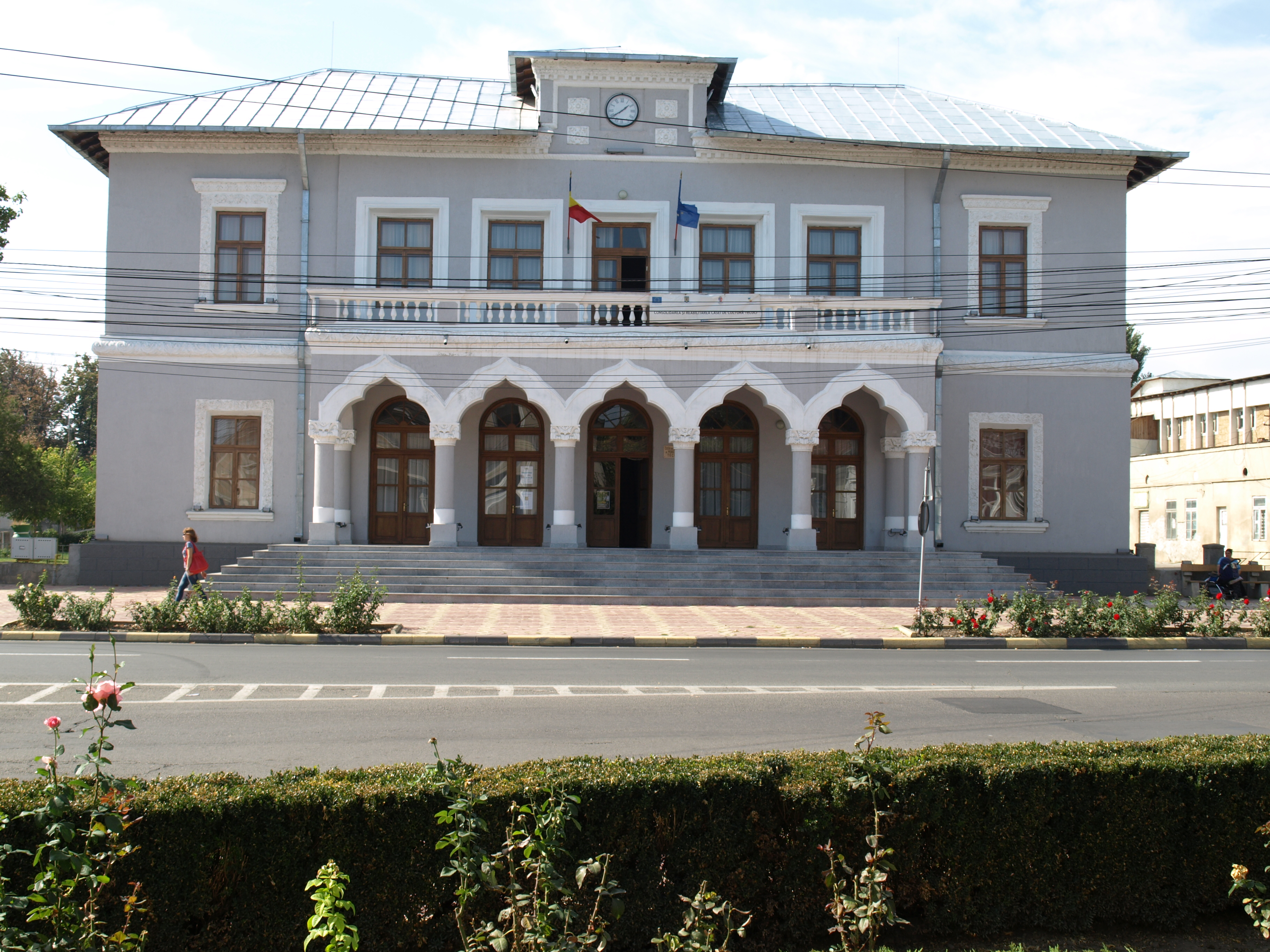
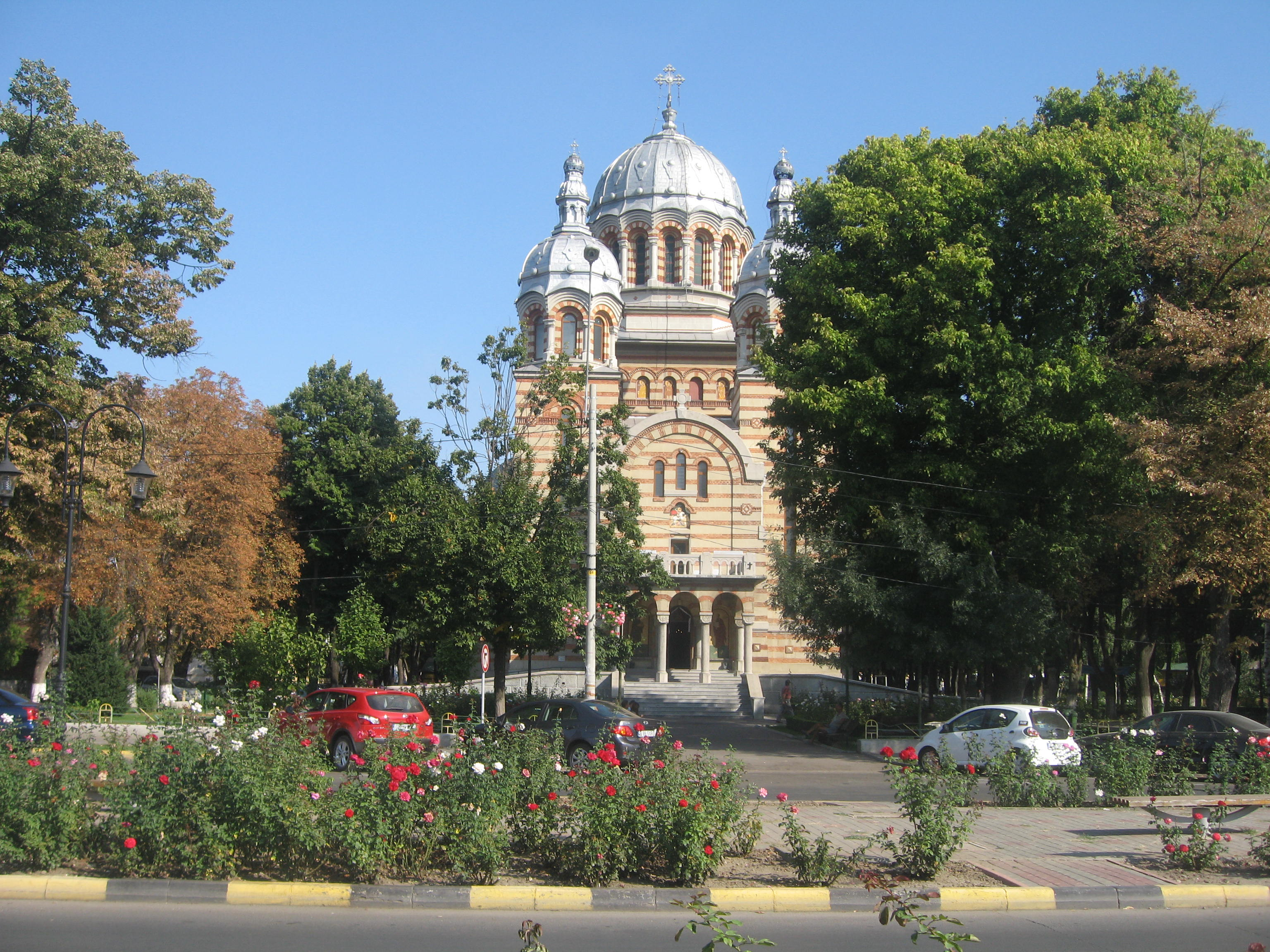
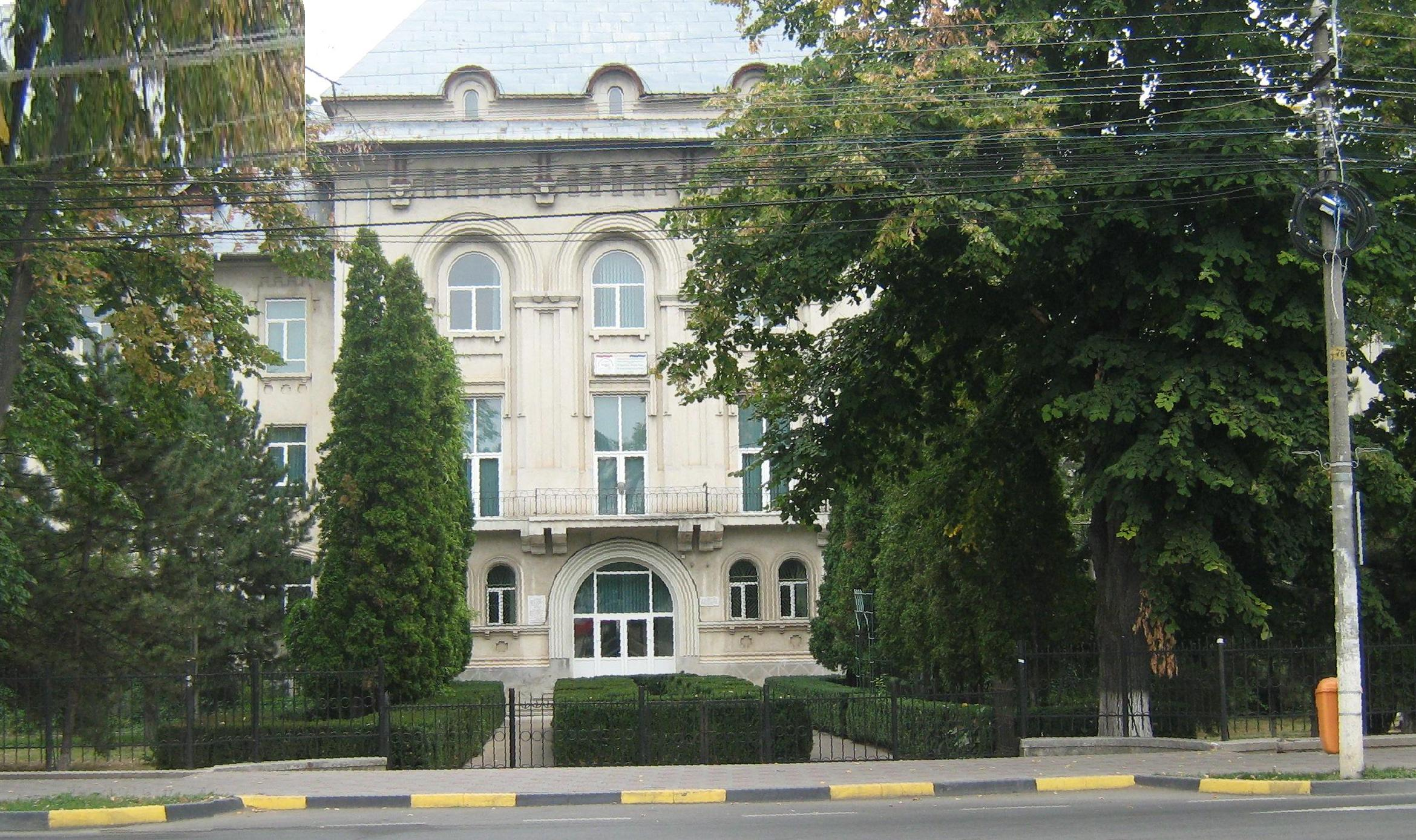
- Tecuci Town Museum House of Culture St. George Church National College of Agriculture and Economics

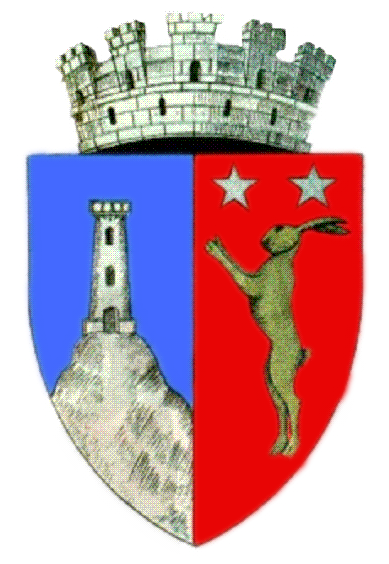
- Coat of arms

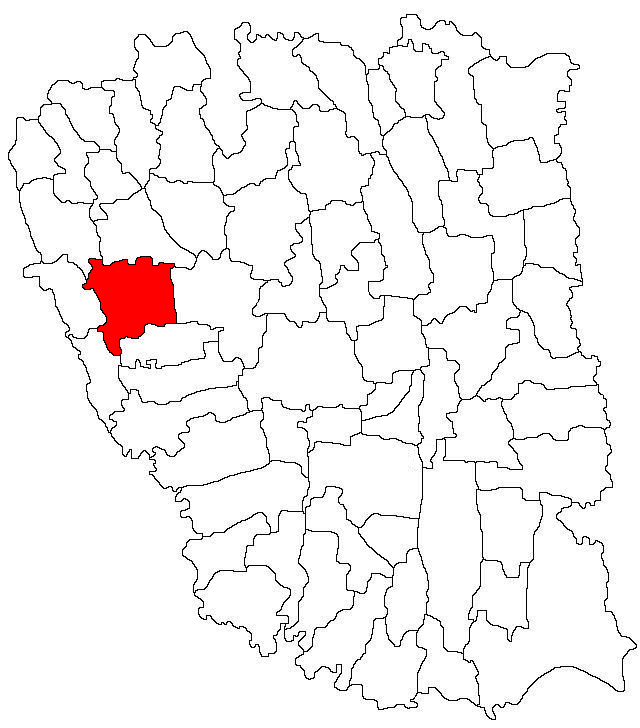
- Location in Galați County

- Location in Romania
- Coordinates: 45°50′48″N 27°25′40″E
- Country: Romania
- County: Galați

Government
  - Mayor (2024–2028): Lucian-Grigore Costin (PNL)
- Area: 86.76 km^{2} (33.50 sq mi)
- Elevation: 50 m (160 ft)
- Population (2021-12-01): 32,801
  - Density: 378.1/km^{2} (979.2/sq mi)
- Time zone: UTC+02:00 (EET)
  - Summer (DST): UTC+03:00 (EEST)
- Postal code: 805300
- Area code: (+40) 0236
- Vehicle reg.: GL
- Website: primariatecuci.ro

Tecuci (Romanian pronunciation: [teˈkutʃʲ]) is a city in Galați County, Romania, in the historical region of Western Moldavia. It is situated among wooded hills, on the right bank of the Bârlad River, and at the junction of railways from Galați, Bârlad, and Mărășești.

== History ==
The area neighboring Tecuci was the scene of a fierce battle in 1476 between Moldavian Prince Stephen the Great and the Ottomans.

Under the Kingdom of Romania, it was the residence of the now-defunct Tecuci County.

== Economy ==
The city was famous for its canned food factories, which preserve vegetables, fruit and meat, as well as for its mustard factories.

== Climate ==
Climate in Tecuci is defined as Dfb (Humid continental climate with warm summers), bordering a Dfa (Humid continental climate with hot summers).

Climate data for Tecuci
Month	Jan	Feb	Mar	Apr	May	Jun	Jul	Aug	Sep	Oct	Nov	Dec	Year
Mean daily maximum °C (°F)	0.9 (33.6)	2.9 (37.2)	9.1 (48.4)	16.7 (62.1)	22.4 (72.3)	25.8 (78.4)	27.7 (81.9)	27.4 (81.3)	23.3 (73.9)	16.7 (62.1)	9.1 (48.4)	3.2 (37.8)	15.4 (59.8)
Daily mean °C (°F)	−2.5 (27.5)	−0.6 (30.9)	4.5 (40.1)	11.0 (51.8)	16.5 (61.7)	19.9 (67.8)	21.7 (71.1)	21.3 (70.3)	17.2 (63.0)	11.2 (52.2)	5.2 (41.4)	0.2 (32.4)	10.5 (50.8)
Mean daily minimum °C (°F)	−5.9 (21.4)	−4.0 (24.8)	0.0 (32.0)	5.4 (41.7)	10.7 (51.3)	14.1 (57.4)	15.7 (60.3)	15.2 (59.4)	11.2 (52.2)	5.8 (42.4)	1.4 (34.5)	−2.8 (27.0)	5.6 (42.0)
Average precipitation mm (inches)	27 (1.1)	28 (1.1)	27 (1.1)	42 (1.7)	59 (2.3)	72 (2.8)	59 (2.3)	50 (2.0)	44 (1.7)	28 (1.1)	33 (1.3)	29 (1.1)	498 (19.6)

== Population ==
Historical population
Year	Pop.	±%
1859	5,769	—
1900	13,401	+132.3%
1912	14,927	+11.4%
1930	17,172	+15.0%
1948	20,292	+18.2%
1956	23,400	+15.3%
1966	28,454	+21.6%
1977	36,143	+27.0%
1992	46,825	+29.6%
2002	42,012	−10.3%
2011	34,871	−17.0%
2021	32,801	−5.9%
Source: Census data

As of the 2011 census, there were 34,871 inhabitants who lived within the city limits, of which 83.2% were Romanians and 4.3% Roma. At the 2021 census, Tecuci had a population of 32,801; of those, 74.17% were Romanians and 3.69% Roma.

== Natives ==
- Nina Arbore (1888–1942), painter and illustrator
- George Arion (b. 1946), writer
- Mihai Berza (1907–1978), historian
- Eugen Boureanul (1885–1971), prose writer
- Gabriel Bujor (b. 1990), handball player
- Elena Caragiani-Stoenescu (1887–1929), first woman aviator in Romania
- Cristina Carp (b. 1997), footballer
- Henri Cihoski (1872–1950), politician and general
- Emil Coșeru (b. 1947), actor
- Vintilă Dongoroz (1893–1976), jurist, lawyer and professor
- Costică Donose (b. 1952), footballer
- Mișu Dulgheru (1909–2002), communist activist and spy
- Alina Gorghiu (b. 1978), lawyer and former president of the National Liberal Party (PNL)
- Calistrat Hogaș (1847–1917), writer
- Iorgu Iordan (1888–1986), linguist, philologist and communist politician
- Dimitrie Lecca (1832–1888), officer and politician
- Mihail Manoilescu (1891–1950), publicist, economist, and politician
- Vasile Mihai (b. 1995), footballer
- Alexandru Mironescu (1903–1973), prose writer
- Henri Moscovici (b. 1944), mathematician
- Dinu Negreanu (1917–2001), film director
- Pedro Negrescu (1969–2021), musician
- Claudiu Pamfile (b. 1997), footballer
- Oana Pantelimon (b. 1972), high jumper
- Alexandru Papadopol-Calimah (1833–1898), historian, politician, and academician
- Gheorghe Petrașcu (1872–1949), painter and academician
- N. Petrașcu (1859–1944), diplomat, writer, memoirist, publicist, art historian and critic
- Ion Petrovici (1882–1972), philosopher, essayist, memoirist, writer, orator, and politician
- Theodor Șerbănescu (1839–1901), poet and translator
- Simona Sharoni (b. 1961), feminist scholar and activist
- Victor Stănculescu (1928–2016), general
- Catalin Tecuceanu (b. 1999), middle-distance runner

== Museums ==
- Tecuci Town Museum (Romanian: Muzeul Mixt Tecuci)

== Festivals ==
Tecuci is the host of several cultural festivals:

- International Aphorism Festival
- Costache Conachi Poetry Festival
- Omătuța traditional folk music festival
