= Theodor Șerbănescu =

Romanian writer

Theodor Șerbănescu (Romanian pronunciation: [teˈodor ʃerbəˈnesku]; December 29, 1839 – July 2, 1901) was a Moldavian-born Romanian army officer and poet.

== Early life ==
Șerbănescu was born in Tecuci in 1839. His father Eni Șerban (later Șerbănescu) was a paharnic (cup-bearer) and a member of the minor boyar nobility; his mother was named Smaranda, and the couple had eighteen children. Theodor attended primary school in his native town, followed by high school at Academia Mihăileană in the capital Iași and then the military school in the same city. A distinguished student throughout, he entered the army as a second lieutenant of the military engineers.

== Military career ==
Having reached the rank of captain in 1869, he resigned. He re-entered the army in 1877, participating in the Romanian War of Independence as an officer with the general staff. He then worked at the War Ministry, rising to colonel and holding command posts in several garrisons (Bacău, Buzău, Brăila). He left the army for good in 1893 and mainly lived at his Vameș estate in Covurlui County. He served as prefect of Cahul County in 1876, but failed to make further inroads into political life. In 1868, Șerbănescu joined Junimea, and in 1891 was elected a corresponding member of the Romanian Academy. He died in Brăila.

== Writing ==
His first published journalism appeared in Steaua Dunării, while his first verses ran in Ateneul Român in 1861. Other publications that ran his work include Albina Pindului, Convorbiri Literare (which championed him), Literatură și artă română, Oltul, Perseverența and Revista contimporană. Much of Șerbănescu's relatively ample poetic output remains in the magazines' pages or in manuscript form as letters and albums. His first book, Poesii, appeared posthumously in 1902. Poesii alese (1927) was edited by Eugen Lovinescu, while Poesii (1941) received commentary from his great-nephew Ion Petrovici and from Nicolae Cartojan. A polyglot, he translated poems by Victor Hugo, Alphonse de Lamartine, Alfred de Musset, Heinrich Heine and Ada Negri; these feature in the 1902 volume. In 1894, he and Dimitrie C. Ollănescu-Ascanio translated Frédéric Damé's Le Rêve de Dochia, poème dramatique. He sometimes used the pen name Dornescu.
