= Nicolae Marinescu (general) =

Romanian medical doctor, general and politician (1884–1963)

- Born: September 2, 1884; Tigveni, Argeș County, Kingdom of Romania
- Died: April 28, 1963 (aged 78)
- Alma mater: Carol Davila University of Medicine and Pharmacy; Military Medical Institute
- Military career
- Allegiance: Romanian Army
- Branch: Medical Service
- Service years: 1907–1945
- Rank: Major general
- Conflicts: Second Balkan War; World War I; Romanian campaign; Hungarian–Romanian War
- Awards: Order of the Crown of Romania; Order of the Star of Romania; Croix de Guerre; Legion of Honour; Order of George I

Minister of Health and Social Security
- In office 4 April 1938 – 23 November 1939
- Prime Minister: Miron Cristea; Armand Călinescu; Gheorghe Argeșanu; Constantin Argetoianu
- Preceded by: Armand Călinescu
- Succeeded by: Nicolae Hortolomei

Minister of State Secretary for the Department of Labour, Health and Social Security
- In office 23 August 1944 – 3 November 1944
- Prime Minister: Constantin Sănătescu
- Preceded by: Petre Tomescu
- Succeeded by: Lothar Rădăceanu (Labour); Daniel Danielopolu (Health)

Nicolae M. Marinescu (2 September 1884 – 28 April 1963) was a Romanian medical doctor, an army general in World War II, and a politician, holding various cabinet positions.

He was born in Tigveni, Argeș County, the son of Marin and Joița Marinescu. He started his studies in Bucharest, first at School Nr. 25 until 1894, and then at the Saint Sava High School, graduating in 1901. He then attended the Faculty of Medicine (1901–1903) and the Military Medical Institute (1903–1907), also in Bucharest, graduating as sub-lieutenant, with the title of Doctor in Medicine and Surgery. He started practicing medicine at the Army's Central Hospital. Promoted to lieutenant in 1909, he was sent in 1910 to study in France and Germany, where he followed specialization internships in Paris (1911) and Berlin (1912). After advancing to captain in 1912, he served the next year in Bulgaria with the 4th Infantry Division during the Second Balkan War. After Romania entered World War I on the side of the Allies in 1916, he served at the Medical Service of the General Staff, was promoted to major in November 1916, and then moved to Iași, where he was the chief medical officer at the Iași railway station. He advanced to lieutenant-colonel in November 1917 and colonel in April 1920. In 1919 he served in the Tisza River campaign of the Hungarian–Romanian War. Subsequently, he practiced medicine at the War Ministry, in Oradea, the General Staff, the Higher War School, and the Central Military Emergency Hospital. During that period, he was also professor of medicine at the Higher War School (1920–1926) and director of the Military Sanatorium in Carmen Sylva (1924–1938).

Marinescu was promoted to brigadier general on 1 April 1937 and to major general on 8 June 1943. He served as Minister of Health and Social Security from 4 April 1938 to 23 November 1939 in the Cristea II, Cristea III, Călinescu, Argeșanu, and Argetoianu cabinets. After the Royal coup d'état of 23 August 1944, he served as Minister of State Secretary for the Department of Labour, Health and Social Security in the First Sănătescu cabinet, until 3 November 1944. He retired on 31 March 1945.

He was arrested on 5 May 1950 by the Communist authorities and sentenced to 5 years of prison; he was detained at Sighet Prison and released on 8 July 1955. He returned to his home at 1, Arhitect Louis Blanc Street in Bucharest, only to find that it been confiscated and all his belongings had been taken away. He died in 1963, at age 78.

== Awards ==
Marinescu was the recipient of the following awards:

- Order of the Crown of Romania, Knight rank – 1914
- Order of the Star of Romania, Officer rank – 1917
- Croix de Guerre (France) – 1918
- Order of the Crown of Romania, Commander rank – 1927
- Legion of Honour, Knight rank (France) – 1934
- Order of George I, Commander rank (Greece) – 1937
- Order of the Crown of Romania, Grand Cross rank – 1939
