= Ioan Lupaș =

Romanian historian, academic, politician, Orthodox theologian and priest (1880 - 1967)

Doctor Ioan Lupaș
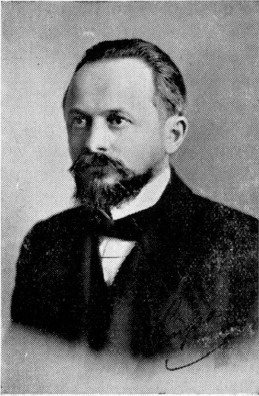

Minister of Health and Social Security
- In office 30 March 1926 – 4 June 1927
- Prime Minister: Alexandru Averescu
- Preceded by: Nicolae Săveanu
- Succeeded by: Nicolae L. Lupu

Minister of Culture and Arts
- In office 28 December 1937 – 10 February 1938
- Prime Minister: Octavian Goga
- Preceded by: Victor Iamandi
- Succeeded by: Victor Iamandi

Personal details
- Born: 9 August 1880 Szelistye, Austria-Hungary (now Săliște, Sibiu County, Romania)
- Died: 3 July 1967 (aged 86) Bucharest, Socialist Republic of Romania
- Resting place: Cernica Monastery
- Party: People's Party; National Agrarian Party; National Christian Party
- Education: University of Budapest; University of Berlin
- Occupation: History professor at the University of Cluj
- Profession: Priest, historian, politician

Ioan Lupaș (9 August 1880 – 3 July 1967) was a Romanian historian, academic, politician, Orthodox theologian and priest. He was a member of the Romanian Academy.

== Biography ==
Lupaș was born in Szelistye, now Săliște, Sibiu County (at the time part of Austria-Hungary). He attended between 1886 and 1891 the primary school in his home village. In 1892 he started attending the State School in Nagyszeben (Sibiu), but, due to a conflict on national topics with his history teacher Árpád Trompa, he was forced to move (together with his colleague Octavian Goga) to the Andrei Șaguna Orthodox School in Brassó (Brașov), from where he graduated in 1900.

He studied Philosophy and Literature at the University of Budapest on a "Gojdu Foundation" scholarship, graduating in 1904, and received his Ph.D. from the University of Berlin (1905) with the thesis The Romanian Orthodox Church in Transylvania and the Communion with Rome in the 18th Century. Between 1905 and 1909, Lupaș taught Church History and Romanian History at the "Andreian" Institute of Theology in Sibiu and attended Theology courses.

During his studies he made his debut in journalism and co-founded the Romanian-language Luceafărul magazine. In November 1907, Lupaș was brought to trial for seditious libel, being accused of having instigated the peasants to hatred against the landowners, and sentenced to three months imprisonment and a 200 Krone-fine. He served his three month-sentence in Szeged between August and October 1908, forced out of the Institute in 1909, and appointed priest to the Săliște parish.

The Romanian Academy elected him an associate member in 1914 and full member in 1916, at Nicolae Iorga's suggestion. However, due to the war, he managed to deliver his acceptance speech before the Academy on 8 June 1920.

After Romania's entry in World War I on the Allied side, Lupaș was exiled to Sopron County (western Hungary) and placed under house arrest. In 1918, he was elected representative for Săliște in the Great National Assembly of Alba Iulia that declared the Union of Transylvania with the Kingdom of Romania.

Starting with 1919 he became professor at the University of Cluj, teaching Modern History and Transylvanian History until 1946, and in 1920, together with Alexandru Lapedatu, co-founded the National History Institute, located also in Cluj; he also taught Church History at the Theological Academy. Lupaș was elected president of the History Section of ASTRA and, between 1932 and 1935, president of the History Section of the Romanian Academy.

In the interwar period, Ioan Lupaș served in the Chamber of Deputies for several mandates, and as Minister of Health and Social Security in the Alexandru Averescu cabinet (1926–1927), as well as Minister of Culture and Arts in the Octavian Goga cabinet (1937–1938).

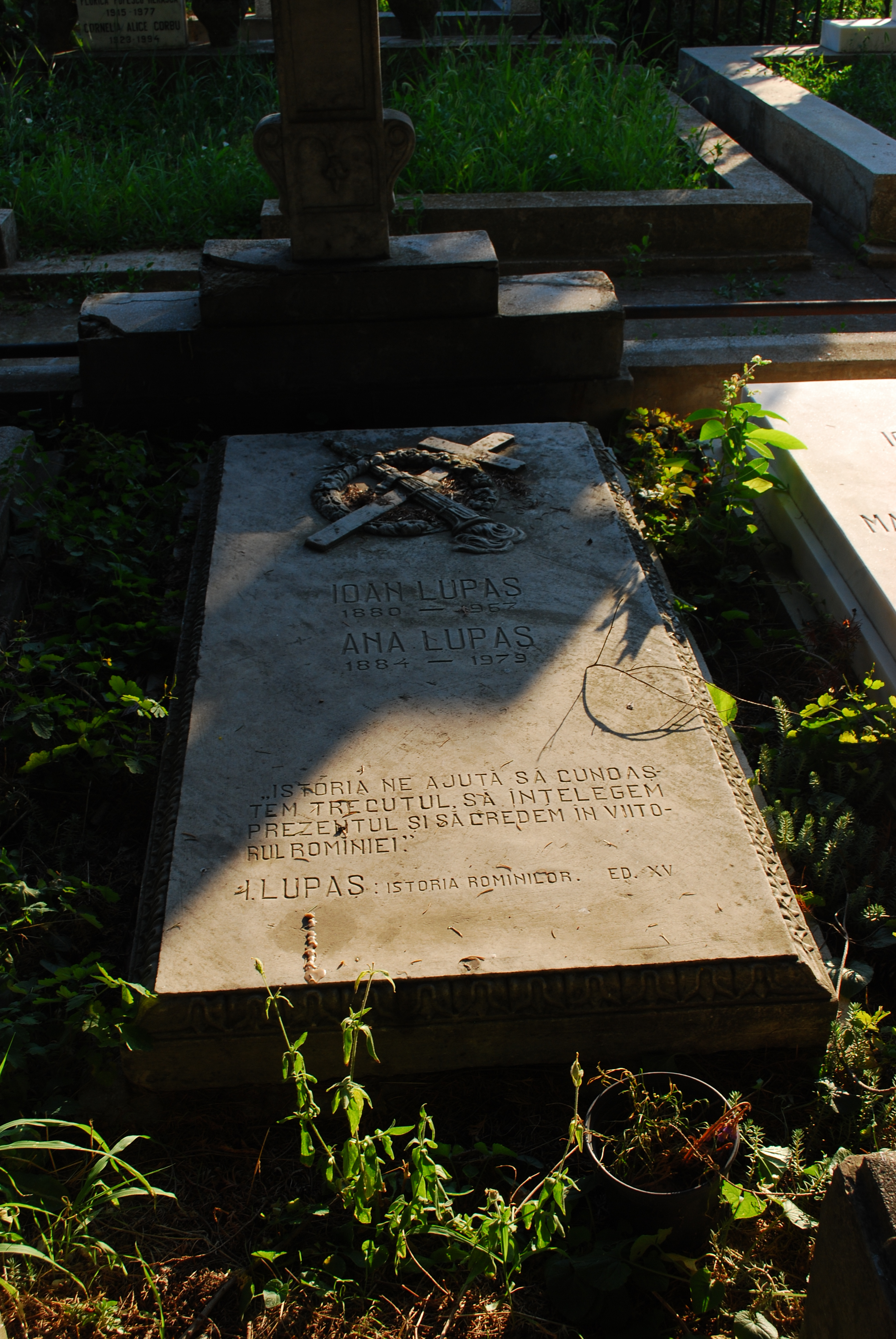
Grave of Ioan Lupaș at the Cernica Monastery Cemetery

Due to his political activity, he was arrested by the communist regime on 5 May 1950 and detained at Sighet Prison until 5 May 1955.

Lupaș died on 3 July 1967 and he was buried at the cemetery next to Cernica Monastery, in Pantelimon.

A high school in Săliște bears his name, and so are elementary schools in Cluj-Napoca and Săliște. A street in Sibiu is also named after him.

== Works ==
- Câteva pagini din trecutul comunei Săliște
- Schiță istorică, Sibiu, 1903
- Șovinismul confesional în istoriografia românească ardeleană. Studiu critic, Sibiu, 1903
- Biserica ortodoxă din Transilvania și unirea religioasă din veacul al XVIII-lea, Budapest, 1904
- Contribuții la istoria culturală și politică a epocii lui Șaguna, Sibiu, 1907
- Mitropolitul Andrei Șaguna. Scriere comemorativă la serbarea centenară a nașterii lui, Sibiu, 1909
- Viața unei mame credincioase: Anastasia Șaguna, Sibiu, 1912
- Misiunea episcopilor Gherasim Adamovici și Ioan Bob la Curtea din Viena în anul 1792, Sibiu, 1912
- Viața și faptele lui Andrei Șaguna, mitropolitul Transilvaniei, Bucharest, 1913
- Principele ardelean Acațiu Barciai și mitropolitul Sava Brancovici. 1658-1661, Bucharest, 1913
- Contribuțiuni la istoria românilor ardeleni. 1780-1792, Bucharest, 1915
- Episcopul Vasile Moga și profesorul Gheorghe Lazăr, Bucharest, 1915
- Din istoricul ziaristicii românești, Arad, 1916, 78 p.
- Luptători pentru lumină, Arad, 1916
- 12 pețitori ai episcopiei transilvane vacante de la 1796 la 1810, Bucharest, 1916
- Istoria bisericească a românilor ardeleni, Sibiu, 1918
- Mitropolitul Andrei Șaguna, Sibiu, 1921
- Andrei Șaguna şi conducătorii "Asociației transilvane" (1861–1922), Bucharest, 1923
- Din activitatea ziaristică a lui Andrei Mureșanu, Bucharest, 1925
- Contribuții la istoria ziaristicii românești ardelene, Sibiu, 1926
- Lecturi din izvoarele istorice române, Cluj, 1928
- Istoria unirii românilor, Bucharest, 1937
- Paralelism istoric, Bucharest, 1937
- Realități istorice în voivodatul Transilvaniei în secolele XII–XVI, Bucharest, 1938
- Doctorul Ioan Piuariu Molnar. Viața și opera lui, 1749–1815, Bucharest, 1939
- Emanuil Gojdu, 1802-1870. Originea și opera sa, Bucharest, 1940
- Documente istorice transilvane , Cluj, 1940
- La Transilvania nel quadro geografico e nel ritmo storico rumeno, Bucharest, 1942
- Zur Geschichte der Rumänen. Aufsätze und Vorträge, Sibiu, 1943
- O carte de istorie bisericească ilustrată, Bucharest, 1933
- Manual de istorie a românilor pentru clasa VIII-a secundară, Sibiu, 1944
- Manual de istoria Bisericii Române pentru clasa a IV-a de liceu, Craiova, 1944
