= Gabriel Marinescu =

Romanian general (1886–1940)

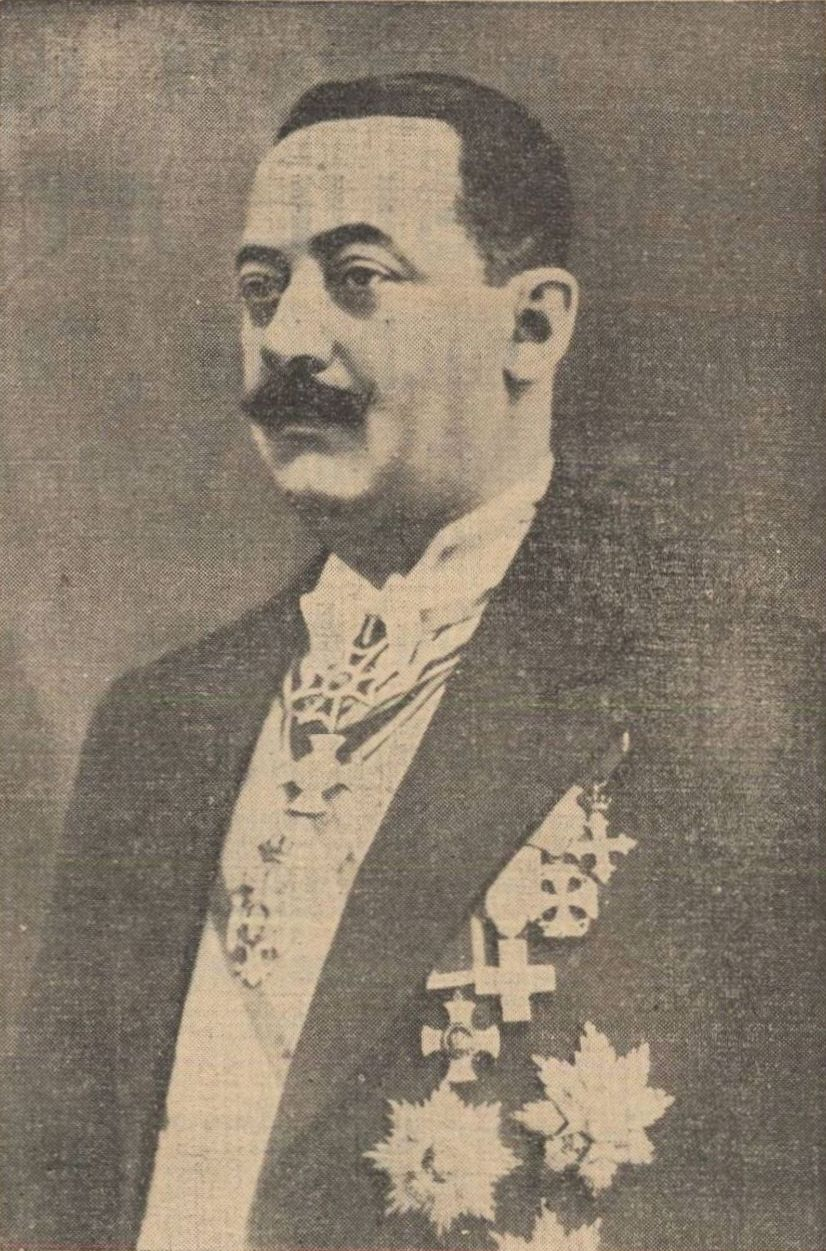
- Born: 7 November 1886; Tigveni, Argeș County, Kingdom of Romania
- Died: 27 November 1940 (aged 54); Jilava Prison, Kingdom of Romania
- Burial place: Bellu Cemetery, Bucharest
- Education: Infantry and Cavalry Military School

Minister of Internal Affairs
- In office 21 September 1939 – 28 September 1939
- Prime Minister: Gheorghe Argeșanu
- Preceded by: Armand Călinescu
- Succeeded by: Nicolae Ottescu
- Military career
- Allegiance: Kingdom of Romania
- Branch: Army
- Service years: 1907–1940
- Rank: Brigadier general
- Conflicts: World War I
- Awards: Order of Michael the Brave, 3rd Class

Gabriel Marinescu (first name also Gavril or Gavrilă; November 7, 1886 – November 26/27, 1940) was a Romanian general.

Born in Tigveni, Argeș County, he was the son of a teacher. He attended Saint Sava National College in Bucharest, the school for soldiers’ sons in Iași and the Bucharest military school, from which he graduated in 1907 as head of his class, with the rank of second lieutenant. After being promoted to lieutenant (1910) and then captain (1915), Marinescu served during the Romanian Campaign of World War I in a Vânători regiment. Promoted to major in April 1917, he distinguished himself in the Battle of Mărăști. For his valor displayed at engagements at Topești and Bârsești in the Putna River valley, on 11 August 1917 he was awarded the Order of Michael the Brave, 3rd class. In 1918 he became commanding officer of the 9th Mountain Troops Regiment. After the war, he joined the staff of the rural gendarmerie, becoming lieutenant colonel in 1921 and colonel in 1926.

In June 1930, soon after assuming the throne, King Carol II dismissed Bucharest's incumbent prefect of police, naming Marinescu, who held the office until November 1939. The deed was accomplished by royal decree without cabinet approval, signaling Carol's authoritarian tendencies. Marinescu thus became a founding member of the royal camarilla. As part of his duties, the general selected prostitutes appealing to the king. In 1934, Carol considered him to be his "personal guard", and a year later he told Nicolae Lupu that Marinescu was "the only man I trust".

In 1935, the building of a new police headquarters began; it was completed two years later. This was initiated by Marinescu and financed by Max Auschnitt. The same year, Marinescu co-authored a hagiographic volume on the king, and delivered a radio address attacking his opponent Iuliu Maniu. In February 1937, he was named state secretary at the Interior Ministry. As such, he took a number of harsh but unsuccessful measures against the Iron Guard, which in 1936 had already marked him for execution. On 10 May 1937 he was promoted to brigadier general.

In January 1938, shortly before the National Renaissance Front regime was established, Marinescu returned to his Interior position. Following the assassination of Prime Minister Armand Călinescu, he was named Interior Minister. During the week he served (21–28 September 1939), his agents killed over 300 legionnaires in reprisal. He was then named head of a new Public Order Ministry, where he was responsible for the police and gendarmerie. This was dissolved on October 3. In November, Marinescu was dismissed as prefect of police.

In October 1940, during the National Legionary State, Marinescu was arrested. He was assassinated the next month as part of the Jilava massacre. He is buried at Bellu Cemetery in Bucharest.
