= Radu Irimescu =

Romanian politician (1890 - 1975)

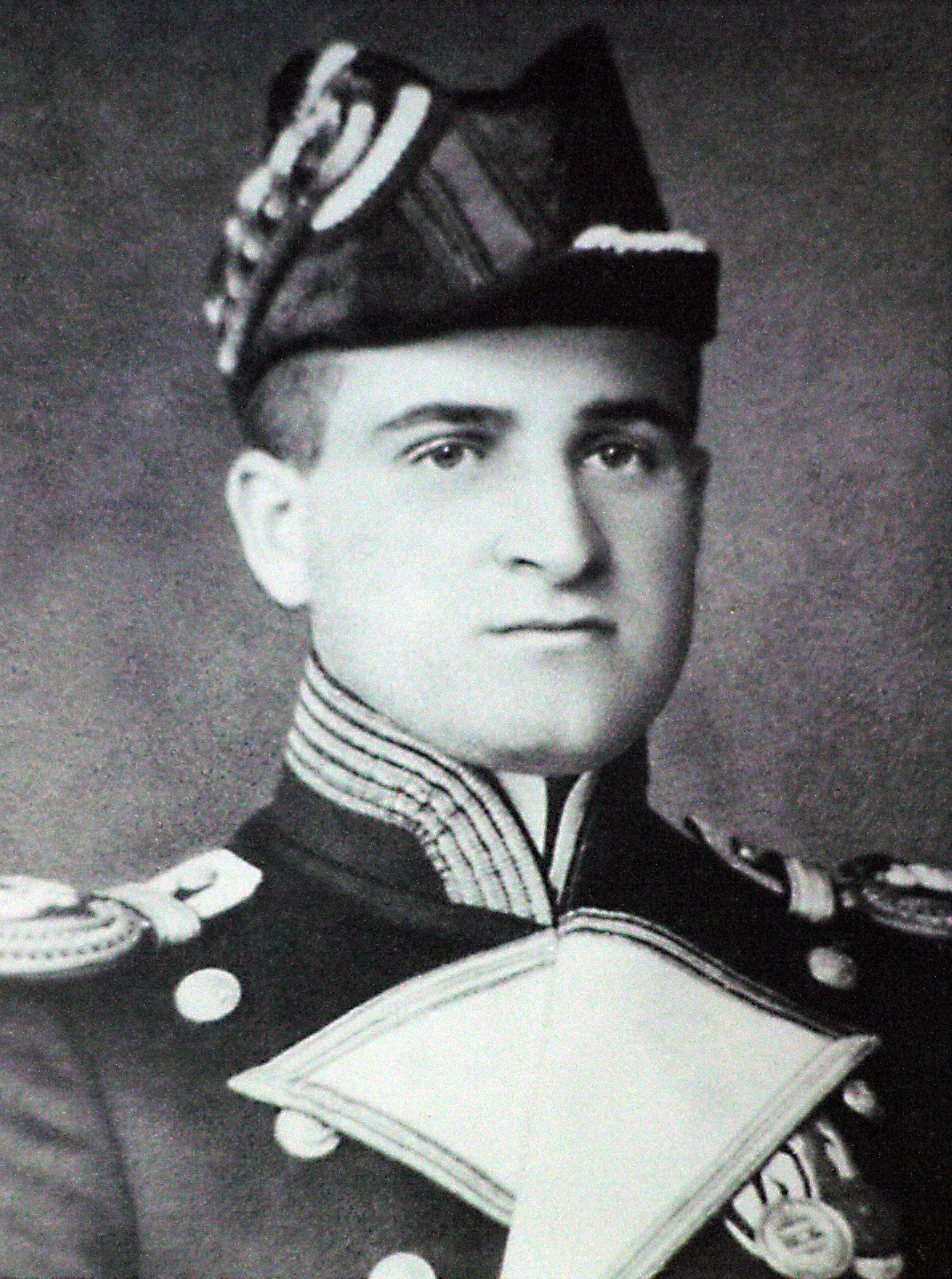
Commander-in-Chief Radu Irimescu, 1937

Radu Irimescu (December 9, 1890 – May 1975) was a Romanian businessman, politician, and diplomat.

The son of an admiral, Irimescu joined the Romanian Navy and, being first in his class, was sent to Germany, as a pre-World War I Romanian-German convention provided. Based in Kiel, he was a cadet in the Imperial German Navy and, again at the head of his class, was appointed a German naval officer, serving two years on a man of war, then being obliged to return to Romania. Admiral von Tirpitz himself held Irimescu in high esteem. However, he became dissatisfied with his career in the Romanian Navy: after cruising the world on a German man of war, commanding a Danube monitor or a Black Sea torpedo boat was not very attractive to him and he left the navy after two years. He was then granted leave to attend courses at the Technische Hochschule in Charlottenburg (now Technische Universität Berlin), from where he graduated with excellent marks.

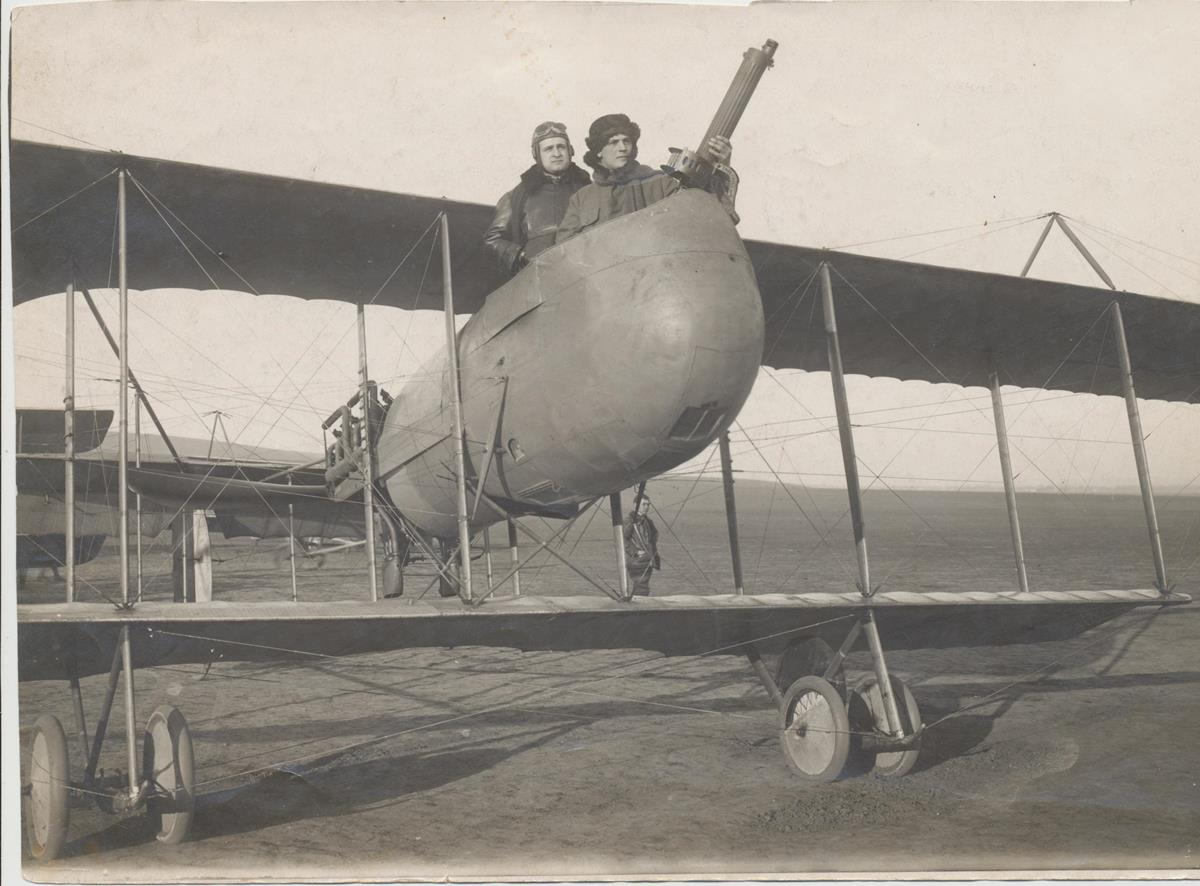
Radu Irimescu (in the back) together with Grigore Gafencu in a Farman F.40 during World War I

During World War I, Major Irimescu served in the Romanian Air Corps and showed great skill as a pilot and as an organizer. He received a degree in engineering from Columbia University in 1920.

After the war, Jean Chrissoveloni, a Bucharest banker, tasked Irimescu with organizing the Chrissoveloni Bank in New York City. He ran the bank from 1921 to 1928, successfully closing the branch because he sensed a financial crisis coming and because operating a foreign bank tended to be unprofitable because more burdensome business regulations were placed on such institutions. At the time, it was the only Romanian banking institution in the United States. After it closed on April 1, 1928, Irimescu, formerly agent and manager, stayed on for a time as its representative on Wall Street.

When Queen Marie of Romania attended a luncheon in New York on October 22, 1926, Irimescu heaped praise upon his host country: "It is natural...that Romania should look today to America for good will and cooperation...The wealth and resources of America are stupendous. Her leadership and influence in the affairs of the world are paramount today. Her prosperity is well established and well deserved...Let us...express the wish for the continuous prosperity of the United States of America and that of the entire civilized world."

Upon his return to Romania, Irimescu, an independent, was appointed director of the Gas and Electricity Works of Bucharest. In August 1932, he was named State Undersecretary of the Air in the Alexandru Vaida-Voevod National Peasants' Party cabinet, with the expectation that he would upgrade and modernize his branch of the military. From 1936 to 1938, he served as Minister of the Air and Navy. Additionally, he served as interim Minister of War for a week in August–September 1937, in Gheorghe Tătărescu's National Liberal Party cabinet.

In 1938 Irimescu was appointed Minister to the United States. This drew some concern from the American Jewish Congress, as he had served in the recent Octavian Goga cabinet, which passed antisemitic legislation. Augustine Lonergan, Democratic Party Senator for Connecticut, forwarded these concerns to Secretary of State Cordell Hull. However, Hull reassured him, noting that as an aviation expert, Irimescu had served in all cabinets since that of Vaida-Voevod, regardless of party, and that he himself belonged to no party. He also mentioned that Irimescu had an American wife. The new envoy arrived in the United States with his wife on April 7, 1938, being greeted by a number of Romanians, including his brother Ştefan (1894–1967), active in the community. Upon his arrival he declared, "As far as I know, there is no anti-Semitism in Romania that deserves any special discussion or notice."

Also in 1938, some three months after Queen Marie died, Time magazine printed a wry article claiming, for instance, that "she had long since been forgiven by most Rumanians for her endorsements of face creams, her exuberant U.S. junket, and the fact that in the end most of her dowagerish intrigues gained nothing for Rumania." The next month, an offended Irimescu asked in the magazine, "Has not this great Lady done anything in Her life to justify a favorable comment on your part?" To his observation that "De mortuis nil nisi bonum", Time's editors replied: "De mortuis nil hokum."

As might be expected for an ambassador, Irimescu expressed public support for the royal dictatorship established by King Carol II (see National Renaissance Front). For instance, in a speech given at a social event on November 26, 1938, he proclaimed that "the last twenty years of experimentation with the so-called democratic regime has shown that political parties could and would act against public interest", claiming that the new system was based on an idea "of organization, of order against chaos, of a regime of social harmony wherein the source of rights is work and one's fulfillment of one's civic obligations, and not the exploitation of the community for personal interest and rapid enrichment." He lauded the new constitution adopted in 1938, which he said "sets up an equilibrium between liberty and authority ... regulates the exercise of [civic] rights for the public good ... insures ... a disciplined liberty" and "disposes once and for all of partisan politics and libertine democracy." He repeated similar sentiments when the constitution's second anniversary was celebrated on March 3, 1940: "The entire development of Romania in the last two years is wholly the outcome of the new Constitution."

On April 9, 1943, Irimescu wrote a letter to The New York Times responding to criticism that Carol Davila, former Romanian Minister to the United States, had levelled against him in that newspaper. Irimescu denied having represented the National Legionary State, claiming that as the King abdicated, he heard a Romanian Radio broadcast from Bucharest that Ion Antonescu had dismissed him; he wrote that he received a telegram from the Ministry of Foreign Affairs of Romania the next day informing him of his dismissal and giving him until October 15, 1940, to pass on his account books to his successor. He stated that at the same time as his dismissal, all his property in Romania, "including bank accounts, securities, real estate" and furniture was confiscated, and that "Antonescu and his Iron Guard cronies have persecuted me relentlessly." As evidence of his "democratic ideals" he presented the fact that he became an American citizen in November 1941. Regarding the ongoing war, he opined that "Only a sincere cooperation of the democracies and Russia can rebuild the world."

Irimescu lived the rest of his life in the United States. In 1955, he was working for Floyd Odlum's Atlas Corporation. That January, he attended a Motor Boat Show, buying a chrome-trimmed, 55-m.p.h. Coronado speedboat for about $5,500, ten minutes after the doors opened.

== Bibliography ==
- "Rumanian Minister Trained in New York", The New York Times, August 28, 1932.
