= Grigore Gafencu =

Romanian politician (1892–1957)

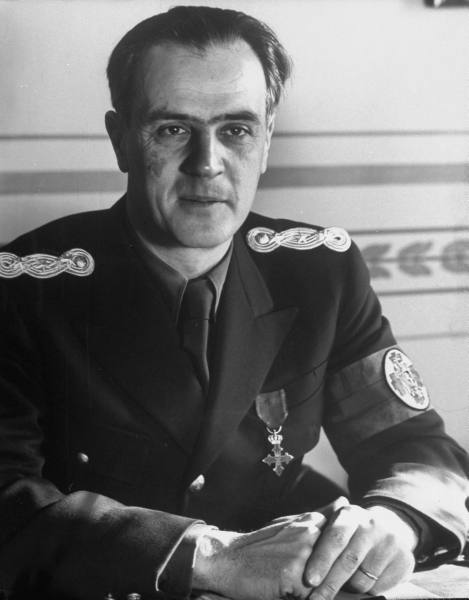

Minister of Foreign Affairs of Romania
- In office February 1, 1939 – July 3, 1940
- Monarch: Carol II of Romania
- Prime Minister: Miron Cristea; Armand Călinescu; Gheorghe Argeșanu; Constantin Argetoianu; Gheorghe Tătărescu
- Preceded by: Nicolae Petrescu-Comnen
- Succeeded by: Mihail Manoilescu

Personal details
- Born: January 30, 1892 Bârlad, Kingdom of Romania
- Died: January 30, 1957 (aged 65) Paris, France
- Awards: Order of Michael the Brave; Order of the White Eagle (Serbia)

Grigore Gafencu (Romanian pronunciation: [ɡriˈɡore ɡaˈfeŋku]; January 30, 1892 – January 30, 1957) was a Romanian politician, diplomat and journalist.

== Political career ==
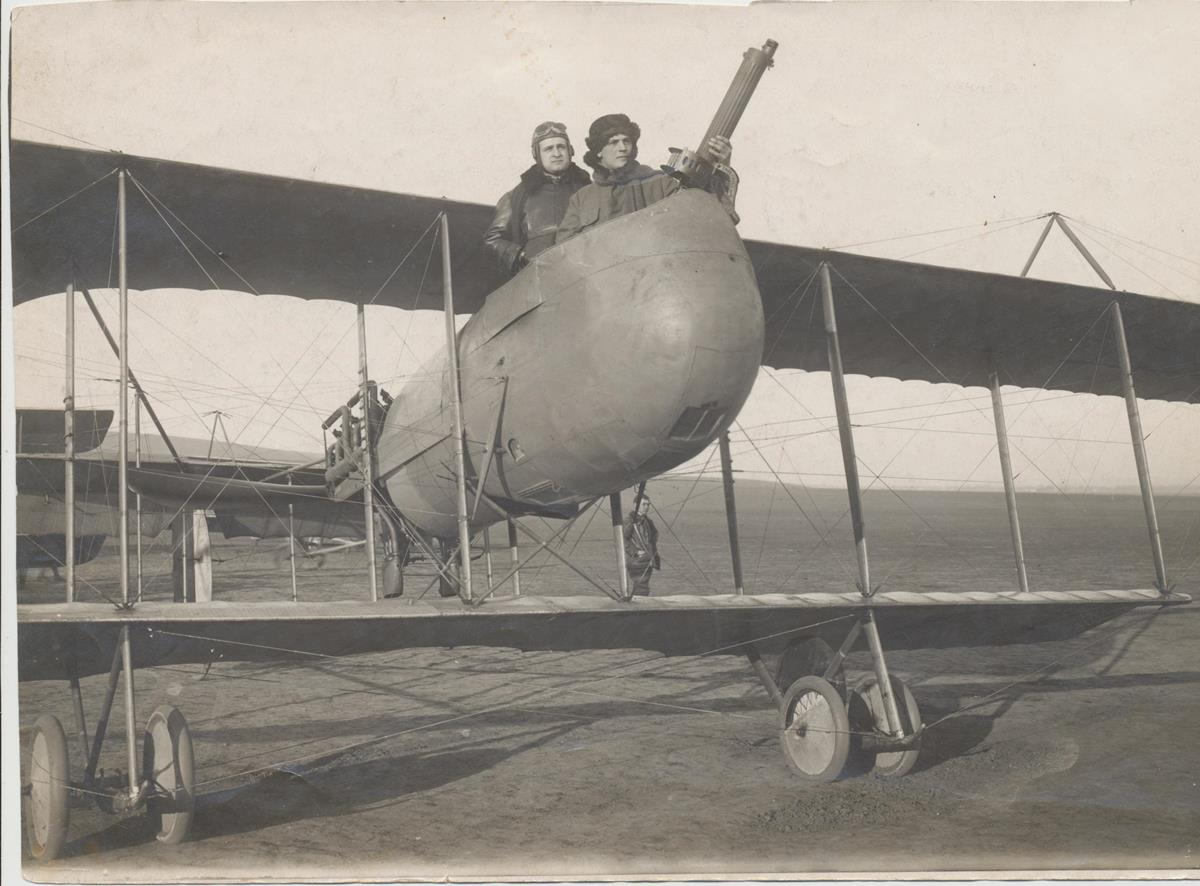
Grigore Gafencu with Radu Irimescu (in the back) in a Farman F.40 during World War I

Gafencu was born in Bârlad. He studied law and received his Ph.D. in law from the University of Bucharest. During World War I, he participated as a lieutenant and received the Order of Michael the Brave for his successful flight from Paris to Iași over Central Powers positions held by German, Ottoman and Bulgarian troops. After the war, he became a journalist and founded the Timpul Familiei newspaper, which was translated in French and distributed in many countries. At the age of 32, he became a National Peasants' Party deputy in the Romanian Chamber of Deputies (lower house of the Romanian Parliament) and was the assistant of the Minister of Foreign Affairs during the Iuliu Maniu government of 1928.

In 1939, he became a Minister of Foreign Affairs. For the next two years, he tried to assure the neutrality of Romania, which was caught up between Germany and the Soviet Union. His efforts obtained guarantees from France and the United Kingdom, which were nevertheless not respected. After Northern Transylvania was annexed by Hungary as a result of the Second Vienna Award, and Bessarabia, Northern Bukovina and the Hertsa region were annexed by the Soviet Union in 1940, he was sent as ambassador to Moscow, where he remained until the beginning of the war against the Soviet Union on 21 June 1941. He then settled in Geneva, Switzerland.

== Exile ==
During World War II, he collaborated with the Tribune de Genève and other newspapers across Europe. In 1944, his book Préliminaires de la guerre à l'Est (Preliminaries of the War in the East) was published under the author name of Grégoire Gafenco by the Egloff publishing house in Fribourg. The book is still considered one of the best analyzes of Soviet-German relations in the run-up to the war.

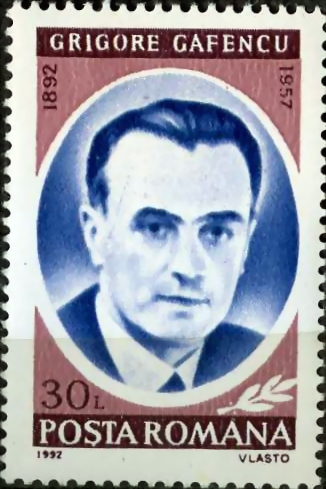
Postal stamp from 1992 honoring Grigore Gafencu

After the war, Gafencu moved to Paris. He then published in 1946 his second book, Last Days of Europe (Derniers jours de l'Europe), in which he described his voyages across Europe in 1939 and 1940. In the preface, he claimed that "the world made a war to kill spheres of influence and we must make a peace to kill them for a second time".

In 1947, he was invited by Yale University Press to the United States for a series of conferences; he then lectured at New York University. He began to form groups that would militate for a European Movement, a federation of European states in which Romania would be included. He participated at the founding of the Free Europe Committee and organized each Tuesday evening in his apartment on Park Avenue, New York City, a series of meetings called Tuesday Panels in which current events were discussed.

He was a member of the Romanian National Committee (1949–1952) and was one of the founders of the Free Romanian League. Gafencu was awarded Order of the White Eagle and other decorations. He died in 1957 of a heart attack at his home in Paris.

A street in Sector 1 of Bucharest is named after him.

Patrick Leigh Fermor described him as "one of the best-looking men I've ever seen, a person of enormous charm and courage".

== Writings ==
- Gafenco, Grégoire (1944). Préliminaires de la guerre à l'Est: de l'accord de Moscou (21 août 1939) aux hostilités en Russie (22 juin 1941) (in French). Fribourg: Egloff.
  - Gafencu, Grigore (1945). Prelude to the Russian campaign, from the Moscow Pact (August 21st 1939) to the opening of hostilities in Russia (June 22nd 1941). Translated by Fletcher-Allen, Edgar. London: F. Muller Limited. ISBN 0830500723. OCLC 1004696556.
- Gafencu, Grigore (1946). Derniers jours de l'Europe; un voyage diplomatique en 1939 (in French). Paris: Egloff. OCLC 1203474431.
