= Victor Iamandi =

Romanian politician (1891–1940)

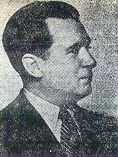

Minister of Religious Affairs and the Arts
- In office 10 February 1938 – 31 March 1938
- Prime Minister: Miron Cristea
- Preceded by: Ioan Lupaș
- Succeeded by: Nicolae Colan

Minister of Justice
- In office 31 March 1938 – 23 November 1939
- Prime Minister: Miron Cristea; Armand Călinescu; Gheorghe Argeșanu; Constantin Argetoianu
- Preceded by: Mircea Cancicov
- Succeeded by: Istrate Micescu

Personal details
- Born: February 15, 1891 Hodora, Iași County, Kingdom of Romania
- Died: November 26, 1940 (aged 49) Jilava Prison, Ilfov County
- Party: National Liberal Party
- Education: University of Iași
- Occupation: Politician and activist
- Profession: Lawyer

Victor Iamandi (February 15, 1891 – 26 November 1940) was a Romanian politician who served as the Romanian Minister of Justice in 1938–1939, in several successive cabinets.

== Biography ==
He was born in Hodora, Iași County, the son of Ion and Lucreția Iamandi. He studied law at the University of Iași, graduating in 1914. From 1916 to 1922 he was a history teacher at the National High School in Iași. After he joined the National Liberal Party, he became a deputy in the lower house of the Parliament of Romania.

Iamandi was assassinated at Jilava Prison, near Bucharest, by members of the Iron Guard during the Jilava Massacre, due to the measures he took against the Guard during his ministerial service.

A gymnasium in Munteni bears his name.
