= Representative Central Band of the Romanian Army =

Military band of the Romanian Armed Forces

- Orchestra Reprezentativă a Armatei Romania
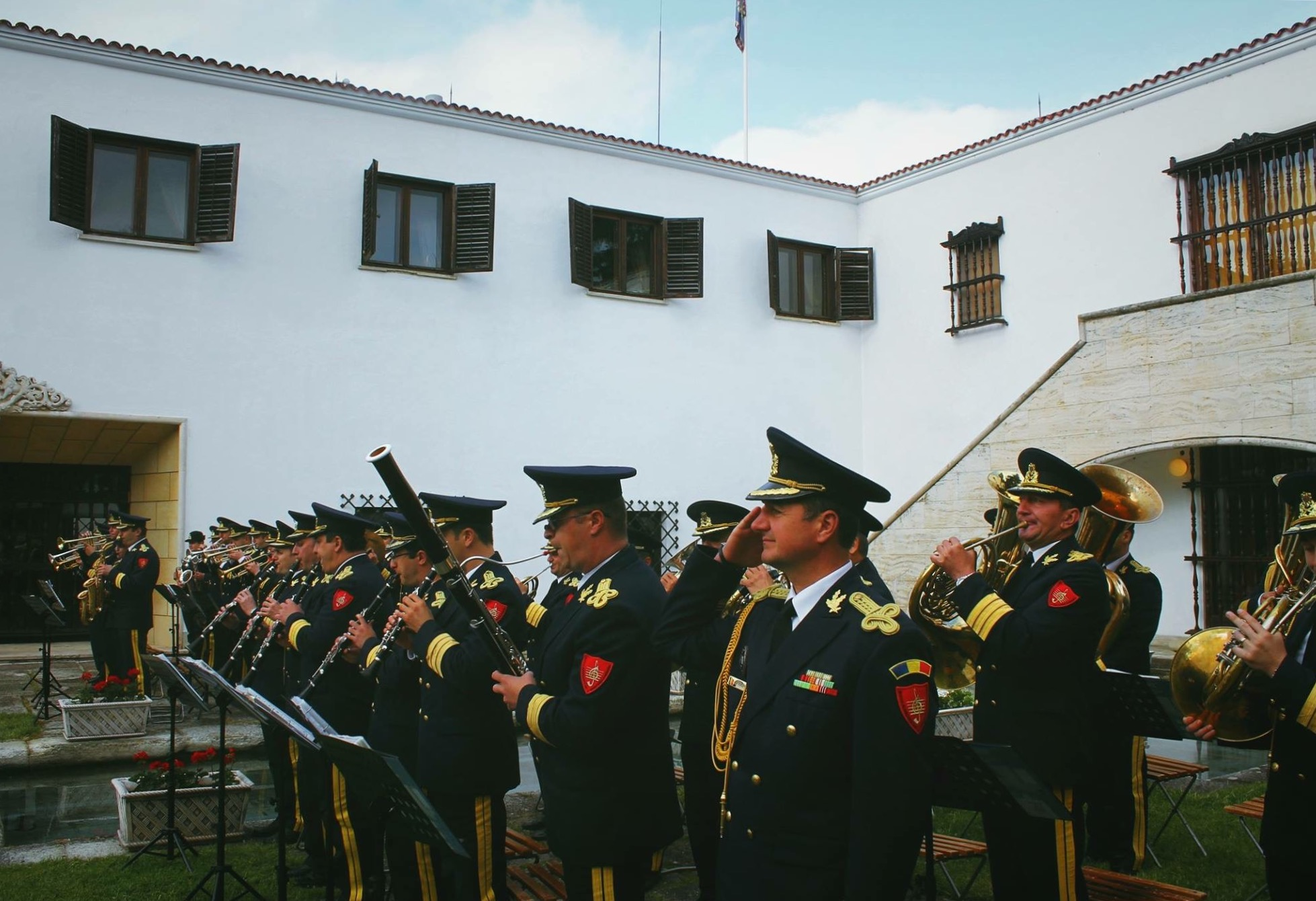
- The band at Elisabeta Palace
- Active: August 1, 1951-present
- Country: Romania
- Branch: Romanian Armed Forces
- Type: Military band
- Role: Public Duties/Musical Accompaniment
- Part of: Romanian Land Forces
- Garrison/HQ: Bucharest
- Nickname: Fanfara Armatei
- Anniversaries: Day of the Military Bands (July 1)

Commanders
- Current commander: Col. Valentin Neacsu
- Notable commanders: Emilian Ursu

Insignia
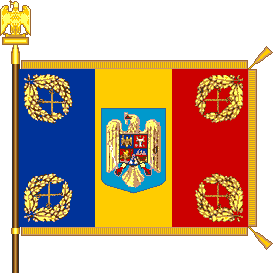
- Ceremonial Flag of the Armed Forces

The Representative Central Band of the Romanian Army (Romanian: Orchestra Reprezentativă a Armatei Romania, also translated to Muzica Reprezentativă a Armatei Romania) is the principal military band of the Romanian Armed Forces and the sole premier band of the Romanian Army based in Bucharest. The organization also involves a multitude of symphonic elements. It is often considered to be a reference to the cultural life of the armed forces and the music of the country.

== Brief History, Duties, and Activities ==
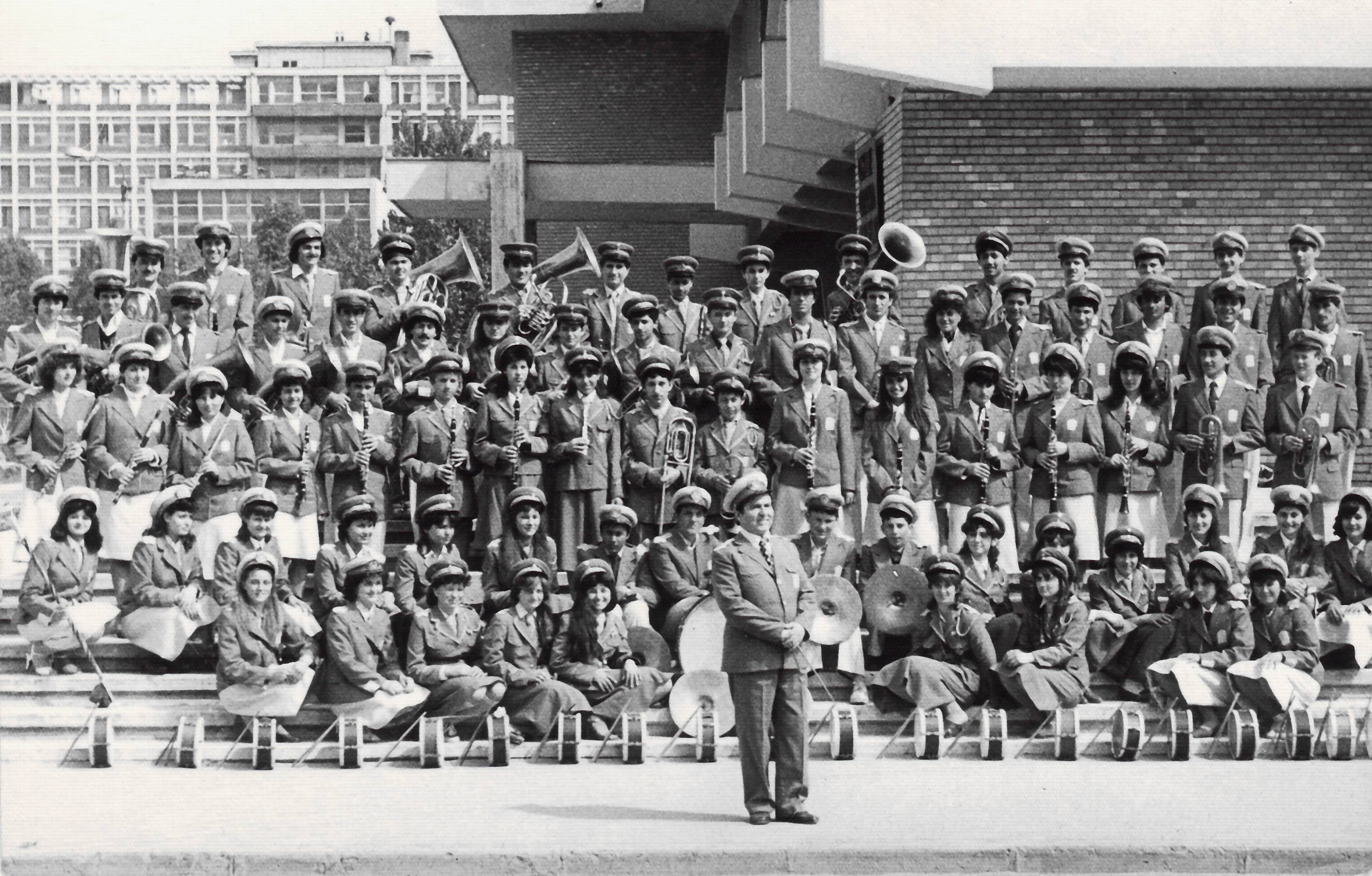
The band in 1984.

Founded on August 1, 1951, the Representative Central Band of the Romanian Army is the seniormost band in the Armed Forces and carries on a long-standing heritage of military music in Romania. In the more than half century since its founding, the band has become the benchmark for all similar bands in the country. The band is composed of at least 70 Non-Commissioned Officers (NCOs) and is by three officers/conductors who are all graduates of the National Music University in Bucharest. The band has been known to perform all types of music, with marching music and classical being the priority type of music, and modern, jazz, and folklore also being used. The band is known for its consistent presence at numerous protocol events such as honors and military ceremonies, and frequently supports army units with musical accompaniment. Protocol events that the band takes part in includes the Great Union Day Parade in the capital, as well as the state arrivals ceremony for foreign leaders visiting the President of Romania at his/her residence. and on the most important scenes Bucharest and the country. The representative band has released many CDs, audio/video tapes, and other forms of media over the years. It commonly performs on Romanian TV channels such as Romanian Television and radio stations like Radio Romania. It has taken part in many public performances in and around the country. Concerts, military tattoos, and musical parades are not uncommon for the band, which visited over 12 countries in Europe, including France, Poland, China, Italy, Denmark, and Germany.

== Ceremonial Music ==
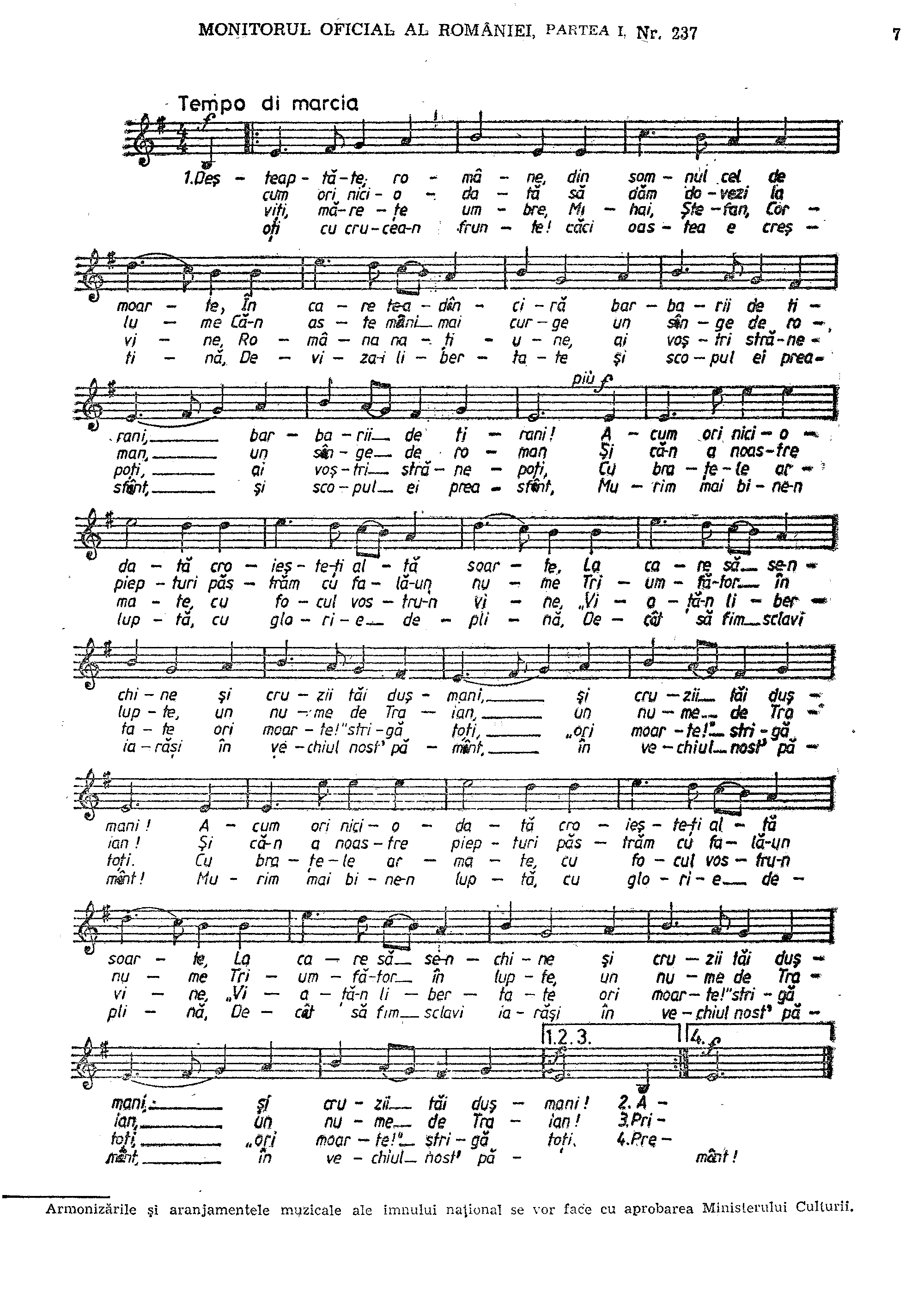
The sheet music to Deșteaptă-te, române, which is the national anthem of Romania.

The band's repertoire of ceremonial music includes but is not limited to the following:

- Deșteaptă-te, române (Awaken thee, Romanian)
- Marș de întâmpinare (Welcoming March)
- Marș Sportiv (Sportive March)
- Drum bun (Farewell)
- Marș Militar (Military March)
- Marș Aniversar (Anniversary March)
- Alexandru Marș (Alexander's March)
- Valurile Dunării (Waves of the Danube)
- Victoria Marș (Victory March)
- Marș Zarandul (Zarand March)

== See also ==
- Military band
- Romanian Armed Forces
- Romanian Land Forces
- Michael the Brave 30th Guards Brigade
- Honor Guard Company (Moldova)
- Presidential Orchestra of the Republic of Moldova
