= United Principalities of Moldavia and Wallachia =

1859–1881 personal union and early form of the modern Romanian state

United Principalities of Moldavia and Wallachia (1859–1862) Principatele Unite ale Moldovei și Țării Românești (Romanian) Romanian United Principalities (1862–1866) Principatele Unite Române (Romanian) Principality of Romania (1866–1881) Principatul România (Romanian)
- 1859–1881
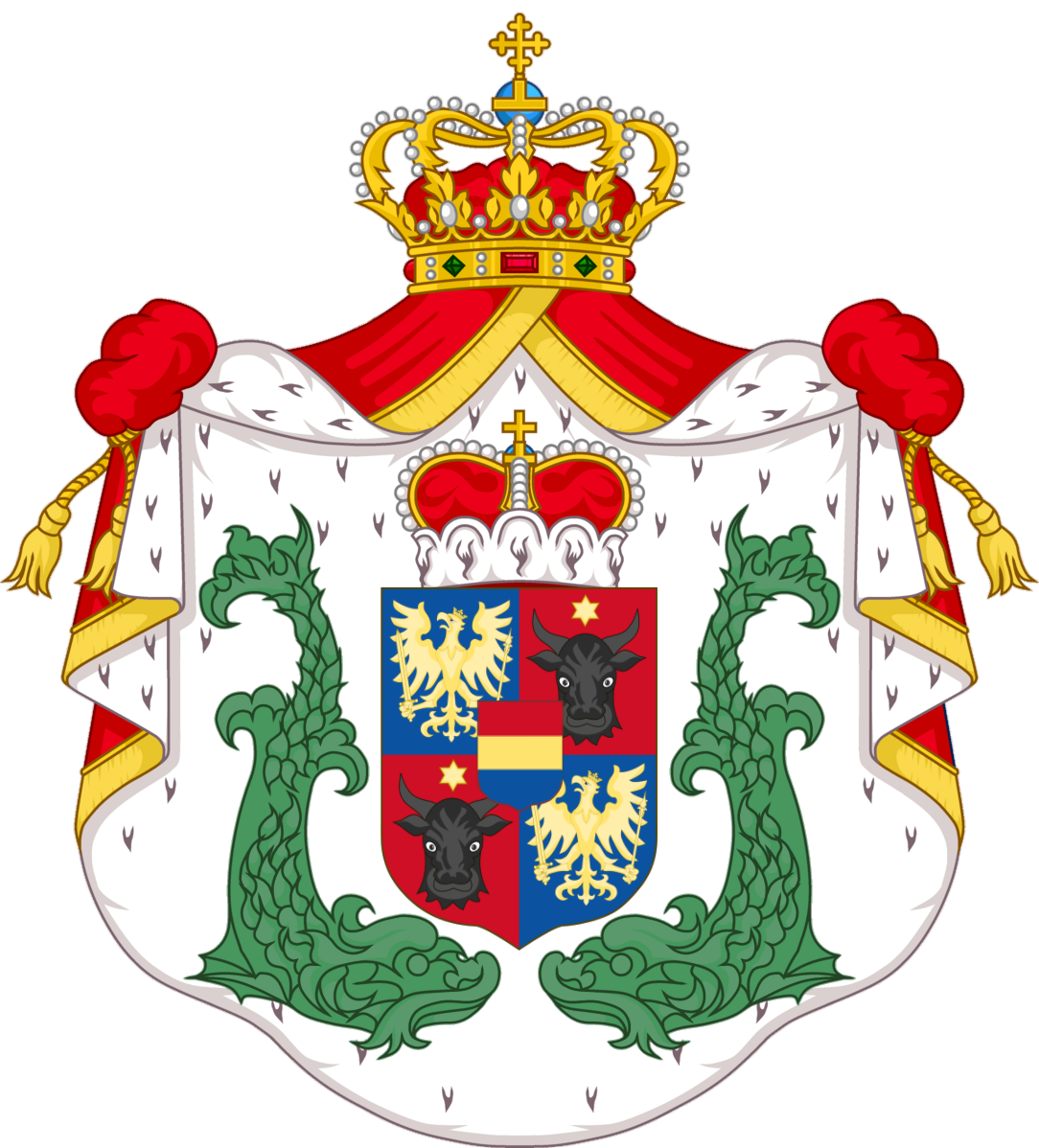
- Top: Flag (1862–1866); Bottom: Flag (1866–1881) Coat of arms (1864–1866) Coat of arms (1872–1881)
- Motto: "Toți în unu"; "All for One"; (1862–1866); "Nihil Sine Deo"; "Nothing Without God"; (1866–1881)
- Anthem: "Marș triumfal"; "Triumphant March"; (1862–1881); "Hora Unirii"; "Hora of the Union"; (popular, unofficial)
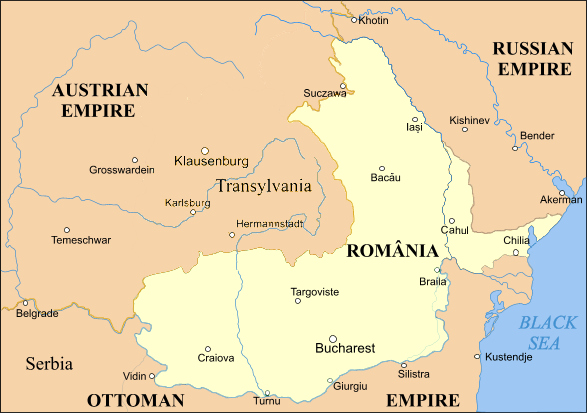
- The United Principalities (Romania) 1862–1878, shown in light yellow
- Status: Vassal state of the Ottoman Empire (1859–1877)^{[a]}
- Capital: Iași and Bucharest; (1859–1862); Bucharest; (1862–1881)
- Official languages: Romanian
- Common languages: List: Hungarian, Yiddish, Romani, Russian, Ukrainian, German, Bulgarian
- Religion: Eastern Orthodox, Catholicism, Judaism, Reformed Church
- Demonym: Romanian
- Government: Constitutional monarchy^{[b]}
- Domnitor (Prince)
  - 1859–1866: Alexandru Ioan Cuza
  - 1866–1881: Carol I
- Regency
  - 1866: Lascăr Catargiu
  - 1866: Nicolae Golescu
  - 1866: Nicolae Haralambie
- President of the Council of Ministers
  - 1862: Barbu Catargiu (first)
  - 1879–1881: Ion Brătianu (last)
- Legislature: Parliament
  - Upper house: Senate
  - Lower house: Assembly of Deputies
- History
  - Union between Moldavia and Wallachia: 24 January 1859
  - First common government: 22 January 1862
  - First Constitution: 13 July 1866
  - Independence from the Ottoman Empire^{[c]}: 9 May 1877
  - Kingdom established: 14 March 1881

Area
- 1860: 123,335 km^{2} (47,620 sq mi)
- 1881: 130,177 km^{2} (50,262 sq mi)

Population
  - 1860: 3,917,541
  - 1881: 4,545,821
- Currency: florin; kreutzer; leu (from 1870)
Preceded by
Moldavia
Wallachia
Northern Dobruja
Succeeded by
Kingdom of Romania
Bessarabia Governorate
- Today part of: Moldova; Romania; Ukraine
- a. De facto independent state.; b. 1866 Constitution of Romania.; c. Independence internationally recognized in 1878.

The United Principalities of Moldavia and Wallachia (Romanian: Principatele Unite ale Moldovei și Țării Românești), commonly called United Principalities or Wallachia and Moldavia, was the personal union of the Principality of Moldavia and the Principality of Wallachia. The union was formed on 5 February [O.S. 24 January] 1859 when Alexandru Ioan Cuza was elected as the Domnitor (Ruling Prince) of both principalities. Their separate autonomous vassalage in the Ottoman Empire continued with the unification of both principalities. On 3 February [O.S. 22 January] 1862, Moldavia and Wallachia formally united to create the Romanian United Principalities or Romania the core of the Romanian nation state.

In February 1866, Prince Cuza was forced to abdicate and go into exile by a political coalition led by the Liberals; the German prince Karl of Hohenzollern-Sigmaringen was offered the throne and, on 22 May [O.S. 10 May] 1866 he entered Bucharest for the first time. In July the same year, a new constitution came into effect, giving the country the name of Romania; internationally, this name was used only after 1877–78, since at the time it was still nominally a vassal of the Ottoman Empire. However, by this time the suzerainty of the Sublime Porte had become a legal fiction. Romania had its own flag and anthem; after 1867, it had its own currency as well.

On 21 May [O.S. 9 May] 1877, Romania proclaimed itself fully independent; the proclamation was sanctioned by the Domnitor the following day. The Ottoman Empire finally recognized Romanian independence in the Treaty of San Stefano. Three years later, on 22 May [O.S. 10 May] 1881, the 1866 Constitution was modified and Romania became a kingdom, and Domnitor Carol I was crowned as the first king of Romania. After the First World War, Transylvania and other territories were also included.

For its triple symbolic meaning, the date of May 10 was celebrated as Romania's National Day until 1947, when the Communist regime installed the republic.

== Background ==
As a historical term designating the pre-Union Principalities of Moldavia and Wallachia, sometimes including the Principality of Transylvania, the term "Romanian Principalities" dates back to the beginnings of modern Romanian history in the mid-19th century. It was subsequently used by Romanian historians as an alternative to the much older term "Romanian Lands". English use of "Romanian Principalities" is documented from the second half of the 19th century.

In the period between the late 18th century and the 1860s, Danubian Principalities was used, a term that sometimes included Serbia, but not Transylvania. In contrast, use of "Romanian Principalities" sometimes included Transylvania but never Serbia.

== History ==
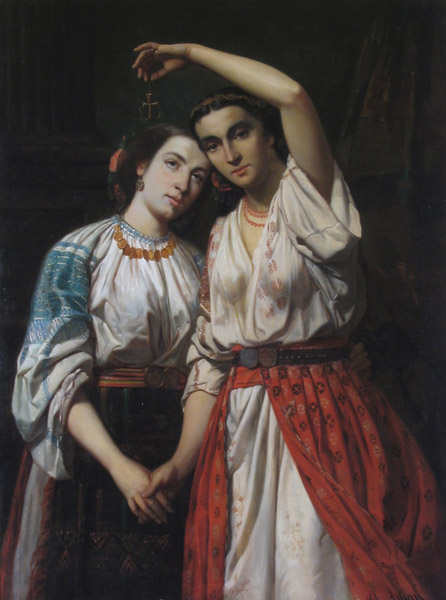
The Union of the Principalities, Theodor Aman, 1857

The aftermath of the Russian Empire's defeat in the Crimean War brought the 1856 Treaty of Paris, which started a period of common tutelage for the Ottomans and a Congress of Great Powers—the United Kingdom of Great Britain and Ireland, the Second French Empire, the Kingdom of Piedmont-Sardinia, the Austrian Empire, Prussia and, though never again fully, Russia. While the Moldavia-Wallachia unionist campaign, which had come to dominate political demands, was accepted with sympathy by the French, Russians, Prussians and Sardinians, it was rejected by the Austrian Empire, and looked upon with suspicion by Great Britain and the Ottomans. Negotiations amounted to an agreement on a minimal formal union; however, elections for the ad-hoc divans in 1859 profited from an ambiguity in the text of the final agreement, which, while specifying two thrones, did not prevent the same person from occupying both thrones simultaneously and ultimately ushered in the ruling of Alexandru Ioan Cuza as Domnitor (Ruling Prince) over the United Romanian Principalities from 1862 onwards, uniting both principalities.

Though internationally formally recognized only after the period of Cuza's reign, the Union was cemented by Ioan Cuza's unsanctioned interventions in the text of previous "Organic Law". In addition, the circumstances of his deposition in 1866, together with the rapid election of Prussian prince Carol of Hohenzollern-Sigmaringen (who was backed by the increasingly important Prussia) and the Austro-Prussian War in the same time, made applying measures against the Union actually impossible.

Following the Romanian War of Independence in 1877–78, Romania shook off formal Ottoman rule, but eventually clashed with its Russian ally over its demand for the Southern Bessarabia region. Ultimately, Romania was awarded Northern Dobruja, in exchange for Southern Bessarabia, on 13 June 1878. The Kingdom of Romania subsequently emerged in 1881 with prince Carol being crowned as king Carol I of Romania.

== The reign of Alexandru Ioan Cuza ==
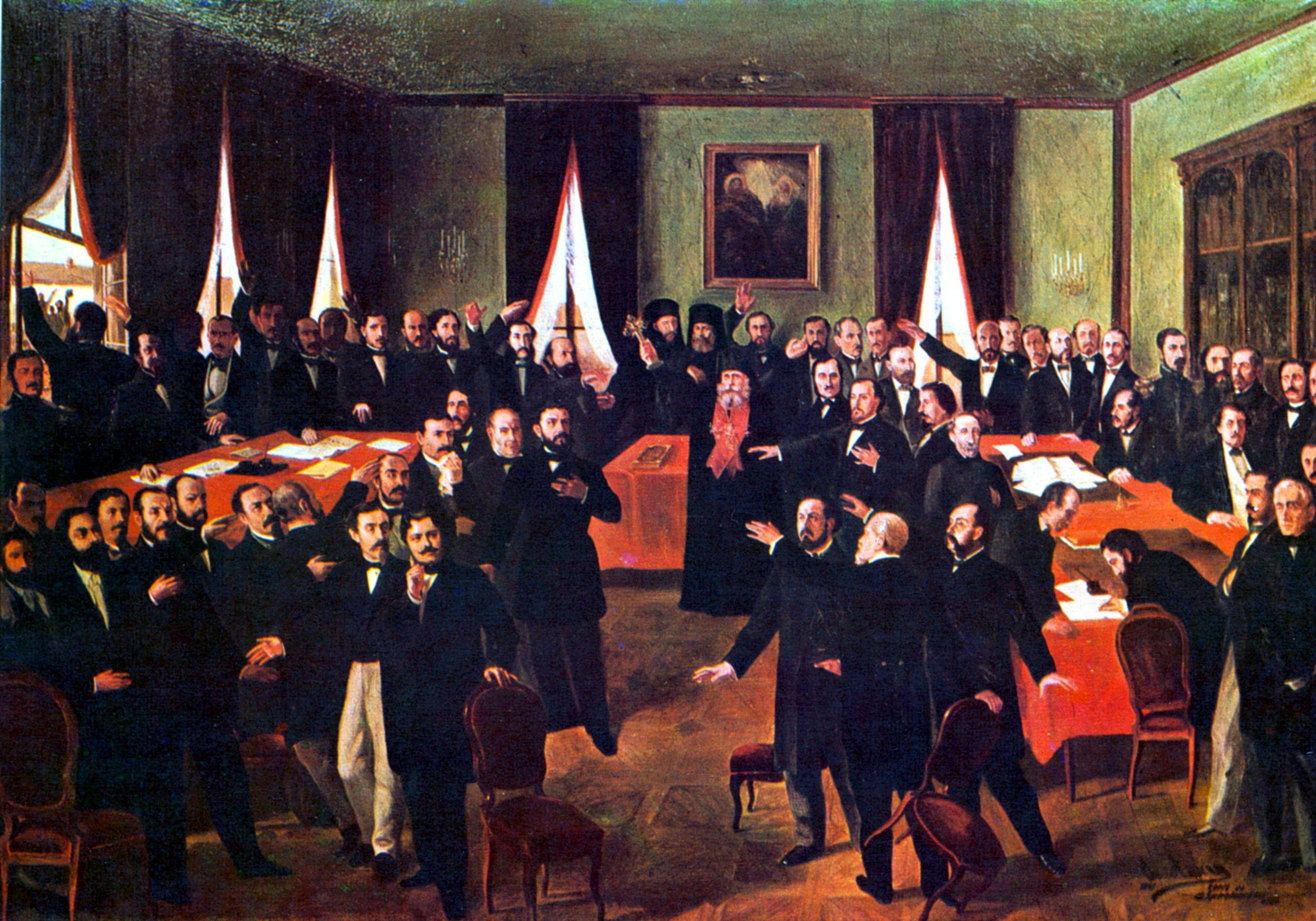
Proclamation of the Moldo-Wallachian union

Alexandru Ioan Cuza took steps to unify the administrations of the two Romanian Principalities and gain international recognition for the Union. He also adopted several reforms, including the secularization of church lands, introduction of free primary education, a French-inspired civil code and criminal code, as well as a limited agrarian reform and one in the army.

Opposition from the large-land-owners dominated parliament to Cuza resulted in a coup against him in 1864. He subsequently instituted authoritarian rule but his popular support, strong at the time of the coup, gradually waned as the land reform failed to bring prosperity to the peasant majority.

Cuza was forced to abdicate in 1866 by the two main political groups, the Conservatives and the Liberals, who represented the interests of former large-land-owners. Although the event sparked some anti-unionist turmoil in Cuza's native province of Moldavia, it was quickly suppressed by the central authorities.

== The reign of Carol I as Prince ==
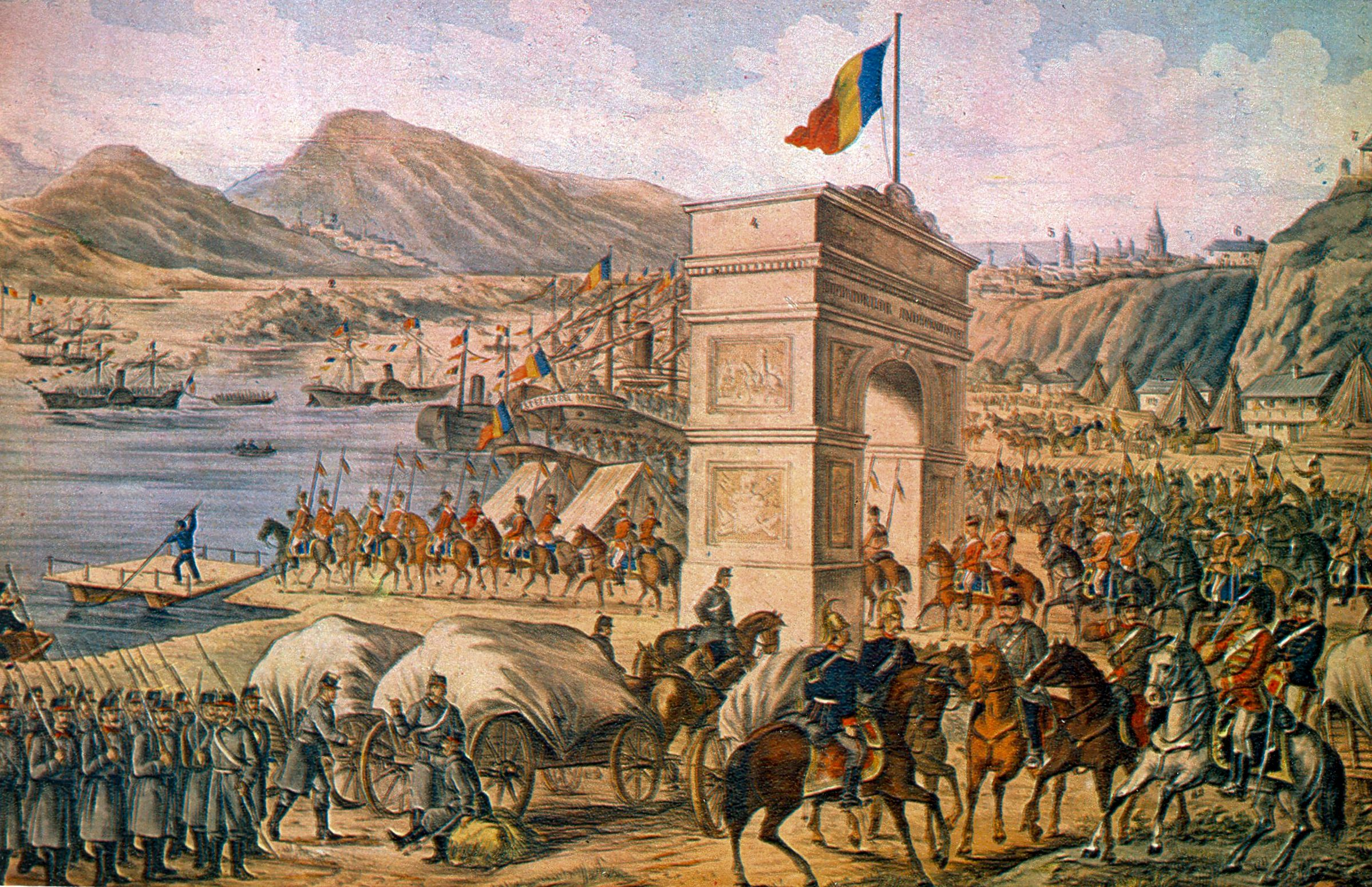
The Romanian Army crossing the Danube

The new governing coalition appointed Carol of Hohenzollern-Sigmaringen as the new Ruling Prince of Romania, in a move initially rejected by the European powers, but later on accepted. In the first year of Carol's reign, Romania adopted its first constitution. This instrument provided for a hereditary constitutional monarchy, with a Parliament being elected through censitary suffrage although the country remained under Ottoman suzerainty. Carol was not unanimously accepted, and a rise in republican sentiment culminated with an uprising in Ploiești in 1870 and a revolt in Bucharest in 1871, both of which were quelled by the army.

In April 1877, in the wake of a new Russo-Turkish war, Romania signed a convention by which Russian troops were allowed to pass through Romanian territory, in their advance towards the Ottoman Empire. On May 9, the Romanian parliament declared the independence of the principality, and joined the war on the Russian side. After several Romanian victories south of the Danube and the ultimate victory of the Russian-led side in the war, the European powers recognized Romania's independence, under the 1878 Treaty of Berlin. Nevertheless, Romania was made to exchange Southern Bessarabia for Northern Dobruja, and allow non-Christians living in Romania access to Romanian citizenship.

In 1881, the country's parliament proclaimed Romania a kingdom.

== List of princes of Romania ==
Prince	Reign	Notes
Alexandru Ioan I (Alexandru Ioan Cuza)	5 February 1862 – 22 February 1866 (4 years, 17 days)	Born in Bârlad, Moldavia
Carol I (Karl Hohenzollern-Sigmaringen)	20 April 1866 – 15 March 1881 (14 years, 329 days)	First German king of Romania from the House of Hohenzollern, the founder of the Romanian branch of this German royal dynasty

== Administrative divisions ==
1861 map of the United Principalities Moldavia (in blue) and Wallachia (in yellow); marks for the two capitals (Iași and Bucharest), and the proposed judicial capital, Focșani, located on the former border, thus in the middle.

Administrative map of the Romanian Principality (1864–1878)

Administrative map of Romania (after 1878)

As of 1872, the Romanian Principality was organized into 33 counties of which 17 were in Wallachia (12 in Muntenia and 5 in Oltenia), and 16 were in Moldavia (13 in western Moldavia and 3 in southern Bessarabia).

== Demographics ==
According to the 1859–1860 census, the United Principalities had a population of 3,864,848.

Religion and ethnic group	number	%
Eastern Orthodox	3,638,749	94.2
Jewish	134,168	3.5
Roman Catholic	45,152	1.2
Protestant	28,903	0.7
Lipovans	8,375	0.2
Armenians	8,178	0.2
Muslim	1,323	0.03
Total	3,864,848	100.0

Cities with more than 10,000 inhabitants, in 1859:

Rank	Name	Population	Region
1	Bucharest	121,734	Muntenia
2	Iași	65,745	Moldavia
3	Izmail^{1}	31,779	Southern Bessarabia
4	Botoșani	27,147	Moldavia
5	Ploiești	26,468	Muntenia
6	Galați	26,050	Moldavia
7	Craiova	21,521	Oltenia
8	Brăila	15,767	Muntenia
9	Bârlad	13,165	Moldavia
10	Focșani	13,164	Moldavia
11	Huși	12,764	Moldavia
12	Piatra Neamț	11,805	Moldavia
13	Roman	10,818	Moldavia
14	Giurgiu	10,557	Muntenia

Notes: 1 - data for 1856.

== See also ==
- Danubian Principalities
- Romanian Old Kingdom
