= Trăiască Regele =

Former national anthem of Romania (1884–1948)

Тръꙗскъ Реџеле
English: "Long Live the King"
- Trăiască Regele
- The former coat of arms of Romania (1923–1947)
- Former national and royal anthem of Romania
- Also known as: „Imnul Regal” (English: "The Royal Anthem")
- Lyrics: Vasile Alecsandri, 1881
- Music: Eduard Hübsch, 1861
- Adopted: 1884
- Relinquished: 1948
- Preceded by: „Marș triumfal”
- Succeeded by: „Zdrobite cătușe”

Audio sample
- Vocal recording of the anthem: file; help

Instrumental recording of the anthem

"Trăiască Regele" ("Long live the King"), also known as the "Imnul Regal" ("The Royal Anthem"), was the national and royal anthem of the Kingdom of Romania between 1884 and 1948. The music was composed in 1861 by Eduard Hübsch, an army captain who later became the chief of the music department of the Minister of War. The lyrics were written by the Romanian poet Vasile Alecsandri in 1881, when Romania became a Kingdom.

It is derived from Hübsch's "Triumphant March", the first anthem of Romania. With Trăiască Regele being adopted in 1884, both are essentially the same song. It was also the national of the then-proclaimed Romanian People's Republic for a short time between December 1947 and January 1948.

== Lyrics ==
Romanian original

I
Trăiască Regele
În pace și onor
De țară iubitor
Și-apărător de țară.

Fie Domn glorios
Fie peste noi,
Fie-n veci norocos
În război.

Refren:
O! Doamne Sfinte,
Ceresc părinte,
Susține cu a Ta mână
Coroana Română!

II
Trăiască Patria
Cât soarele ceresc,
Rai vesel pământesc
Cu mare, falnic nume.

Fie-n veci el ferit
De nevoi,
Fie-n veci locuit
De eroi.

Refren:
O! Doamne Sfinte,
Ceresc părinte,
Întinde a Ta mână
Pe Țara Română!

English translation

I
Long live the King,
In peace and honour,
Loving his country,
And defending it.

May he a glorious Lord be,
May he reign over us,
May he forever fortunate be,
In war!

Chorus:
O! Holy Lord,
Our Heavenly Father,
Hold with Thy Hand,
The Romanian Crown!

II
Long live the Motherland,
So long as the Sun's in the sky,
Earth's glad Promised Land,
With a name great and lofty.

May it forever spared be
Of needs,
May it forever inhabited be
By heroes.

Chorus:
O! Holy Lord,
Our Heavenly Father,
Extend Thy Hand
O'er the Romanian Land!
