= Drum bun =

1856 Romanian march by Ștefan Nosievici

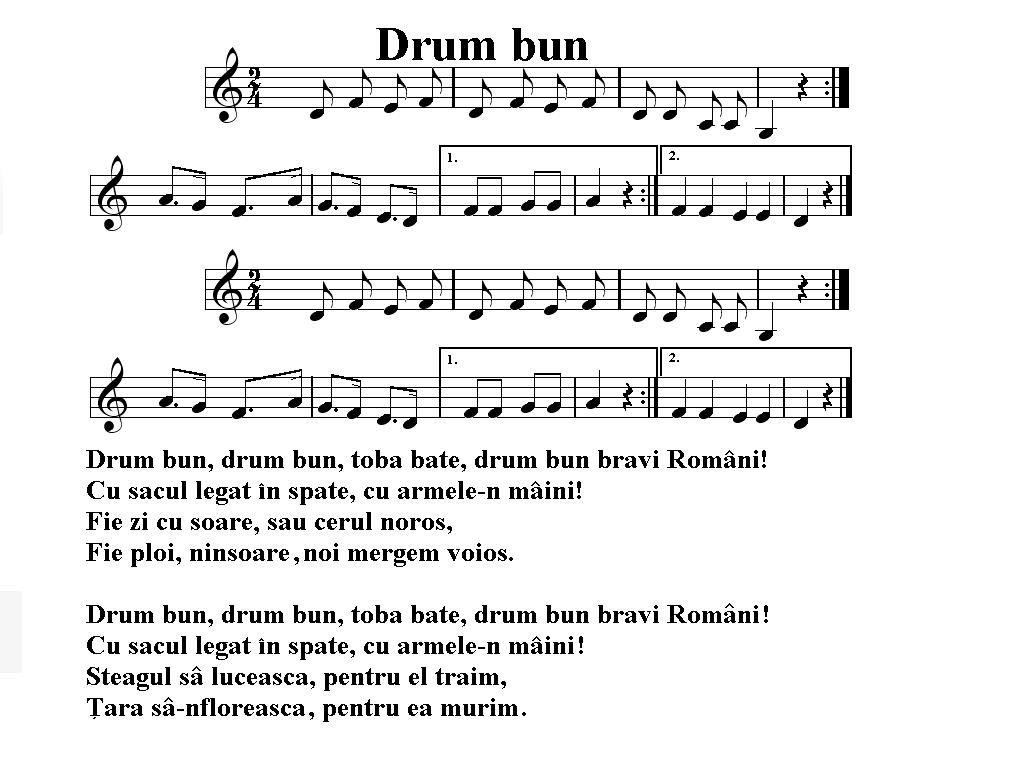
Sheet music of the march

"Drum bun" (transl. "Farewell") is a Romanian march composed by Ștefan Nosievici in 1856. It was one of the two male choirs he composed, the other being "Tătarul". The Society for Romanian Culture and Literature in Bukovina posthumously published the song in 1869 after Nosievici's death on 12 November of the same year. Although Nosievici composed the march, the lyrics were written by Vasile Alecsandri. Alexandru Flechtenmacher has also been attributed as the author of the song. It used to be very popular, especially among primary schools.

The song has also been identified as the "March of the Romanian Soldiers" (Marșul ostașilor români) or the "March of the Romanian Soldiers in Bessarabia" (Marșul ostașilor români în Basarabia).

"Drum bun" was sung during the Romanian War of Independence and World War I. Furthermore, the march appeared in Sergiu Nicolaescu's film Pentru patrie and is one of the songs played by the Representative Central Band of the Romanian Army.

== Lyrics ==
The lyrics of the march (and their English translation) are the following:

Drum bun, drum bun, toba bate, drum bun, bravi români, ura!
Cu sacul legat în spate, cu armele-n mâini, ura!
Fie zi cu soare, fie, sau cerul noros,
Fie ploi, ninsoare fie, noi mergem voios, drum bun!

Drum bun, drum bun, toba bate, drum bun, bravi români, ura!
Cu sacul legat în spate, cu armele-n mâini, ura!
Fie la paradă, fie la război,
Toți în rând grămadă, veseli mergem noi!

Drum bun, drum bun, toba bate, drum bun, bravi români, ura!
Cu sacul legat în spate, cu armele-n mâini, ura!
Steagul să lucească, steagul, pentru el trăim,
Țara să-nflorească, țara, pentru ea murim, drum bun!

Translation:

Farewell, farewell, drum is beating, farewell, brave Romanians, hooray!
With the sack tied at the back, with weapons in hands, hooray!
Be it sunny day, be it, or a cloudy sky,
Be it rain, snowing be it, we go cheerfully, farewell!

Farewell, farewell, drum is beating, farewell, brave Romanians, hooray!
With the sack tied at the back, with weapons in the hands, hooray!
Be it at the parade, be it at war,
Everyone in a row together, joyful we go!

Farewell, farewell, drum is beating, farewell, brave Romanians, hooray!
With the sack tied at the back, with weapons in the hands, hooray!
May the flag shine, the flag, for it we live,
May the country flourish, the country, for her we die, farewell!
