= Kingdom of Romania =

Kingdom in Europe between 1881 and 1947

Coordinates: 44.44°N 26.10°E

Kingdom of Romania Regatul României
- 1881–1947
- Flag Coat of arms (1881–1921) Coat of arms (1921–1947)
- Motto: Nihil Sine Deo "Nothing without God"
- Anthem: Marș triumfal "Triumphant March" (1881–1884) Trăiască Regele "Long Live the King" (1884–1947)
- Capital: Bucharest (1881–1916, 1918–1947); Iași (1916–1918)
- Official languages: Romanian
- Common languages: List: Hungarian, German, Yiddish, Ukrainian, Russian, Bulgarian, Romani, Turkish, Gagauz and others
- Religion: Romanian Orthodox (state religion)
- Demonym: Romanian
- Government: Constitutional monarchy
- King
  - 1881–1914: Carol I
  - 1914–1927: Ferdinand I
  - 1927–1930 (1st reign): Michael I
  - 1930–1940: Carol II
  - 1940–1947 (2nd reign): Michael I
- Prime Minister
  - 1881 (first): Ion Brătianu
  - 1940–1944: Ion Antonescu^{[a]}
  - 1945–1947 (last): Petru Groza
- Legislature: Parliament (1881–1937; 1939–1940); None (rule by decree) (1937–1939; 1940–1946); Assembly of Deputies (1946–1947)
  - Upper house: Senate (1881–1937; 1939–1940)
  - Lower house: Assembly of Deputies (1881–1937; 1939–1940)
- Historical era: Belle Époque; World War I; Interwar period; World War II; Cold War
  - Kingdom proclaimed: 10 May 1881
  - Republic proclaimed: 30 December 1947

Area
- 1915^{[b]}: 137,903 km^{2} (53,245 sq mi)
- 1940^{[b]}^{[c]}: 295,049 km^{2} (113,919 sq mi)

Population
  - 1915^{[b]}: 7,900,000
  - 1940^{[b]}^{[c]}: 20,058,378
- GDP (nominal): 1938^{[d]} estimate
  - Total: $2.834 billion
- Currency: Romanian Leu
Preceded by
1881: United Principalities
1913: Kingdom of Bulgaria
1918: Moldavian Democratic Republic
Duchy of Bukovina
Hungarian People's Republic
1919: Banat Republic
Succeeded by
1947: Romanian People's Republic
1940/1944: Moldavian SSR
Ukrainian SSR
1940: Kingdom of Bulgaria
- Today part of: Romania; Moldova; Ukraine; Bulgaria
- a. Was formally declared Conducător (literally, "Leader") of the state on 6 September 1940, by a royal decree which consecrated a ceremonial role for the monarch.; b. Area and population according to Ioan Suciu, Istoria contemporana a României (1918–2005).; c. The indicator for the localities of Romania (1941).; d. 1938 GDP in lei amounting to 387.204 billion (20,487 lei per capita at an estimated population of 18.9 million) at the 1938 average exchange rate of 1 leu for $0.00732.

The Kingdom of Romania (Romanian: Regatul României) was a constitutional monarchy that existed from 25 March [O.S. 13 March] 1881 with the crowning of prince Karl of Hohenzollern-Sigmaringen as King Carol I (thus beginning the Romanian royal family), until 30 December 1947 with the abdication of King Michael I and the Romanian Parliament proclamation of the Romanian People's Republic.

From 1859 to 1877, Romania evolved from a personal union of two principalities: (Moldavia and Wallachia) called the Unification of Moldavia and Wallachia also known as "The Little Union" under a single prince to an autonomous principality with a Hohenzollern monarchy. The country gained its independence from the Ottoman Empire during the 1877–1878 Russo-Turkish War (known locally as the Romanian War of Independence), after which it was forced to cede the southern part of Bessarabia in exchange for Northern Dobruja. The kingdom's territory during the reign of King Carol I, between 13 (O.S.) / 25 March 1881 and 27 September (O.S.) / 10 October 1914 is sometimes referred to as the Romanian Old Kingdom, to distinguish it from "Greater Romania", which included the provinces that became part of the state after World War I (Bessarabia, Banat, Bukovina, and Transylvania).

With the exception of the southern halves of Bukovina and Transylvania, these territories were ceded to neighboring countries in 1940, under the pressure of Nazi Germany or the Soviet Union. Following the abolishment of the 1923 constitution by King Carol II in 1938, the Kingdom of Romania became an absolute monarchy, only to become a military dictatorship under Ion Antonescu in 1940 after the forced abdication of King Carol II, with his successor, King Michael I being a figurehead with no effective political power. The country's name was changed to Legionary Romania.

In World War II Romania fought on the side of the Axis powers. Following the King Michael's Coup against Ion Antonescu in 1944 the Kingdom of Romania became a constitutional monarchy again and switched sides to the Allies, recovering Northern Transylvania. The influence of the neighbouring Soviet Union and the policies followed by Communist-dominated coalition governments ultimately led to the abolition of the monarchy, with Romania becoming a Soviet satellite state as the People's Republic of Romania on the last day of 1947.

Romania's economy was mainly agricultural. In 1919, about 72% of Romanians worked in farming, and most peasants were poor. A land reform in 1921 gave out land but did little to improve farming, and agriculture suffered badly in the Great Depression. Industry grew, with new factories in engineering, metals and weapons. Oil became the most important industry, and by the late 1930s Romania was one of the top oil exporters.

== History ==
=== Unification and monarchy ===
The 1859 ascendancy of Alexandru Ioan Cuza as prince of both Moldavia and Wallachia under the nominal suzerainty of the Ottoman Empire united an identifiably Romanian nation under a single ruler. On 24 January (O.S.) / 5 February 1862, the two principalities were formally united to form the Principality of Romania, with Bucharest as its capital.

On 11 (O.S.) / 23 February 1866 a so-called "monstrous coalition", composed of Conservatives and radical Liberals, forced Cuza to abdicate. The German prince (and Prussian officer) Karl Eitel Friedrich Zephyrinus Ludwig von Hohenzollern-Sigmaringen was appointed as Prince of Romania, in a move to assure Prussian backing to unity and future independence. He immediately adopted the Romanian spelling of his name, Carol, and his cognatic descendants would rule Romania until the overthrow of the monarchy in 1947.

For more than a decade after the formal union of the two principalities, Romania was still nominally a vassal of the Ottoman Empire. However, this was increasingly a legal fiction. Romania had its own flag and anthem, and from 1867 had its own currency as well. Following the Russo-Turkish War of 1877–1878, Romania was recognized as an independent state by the Treaty of Berlin, 1878 and acquired Dobruja, although it was forced to surrender southern Bessarabia (Budjak) to Russia. On 15 March 1881, as an assertion of full sovereignty, the Romanian parliament raised the country to the status of a kingdom, and Carol was crowned king on 10 May.

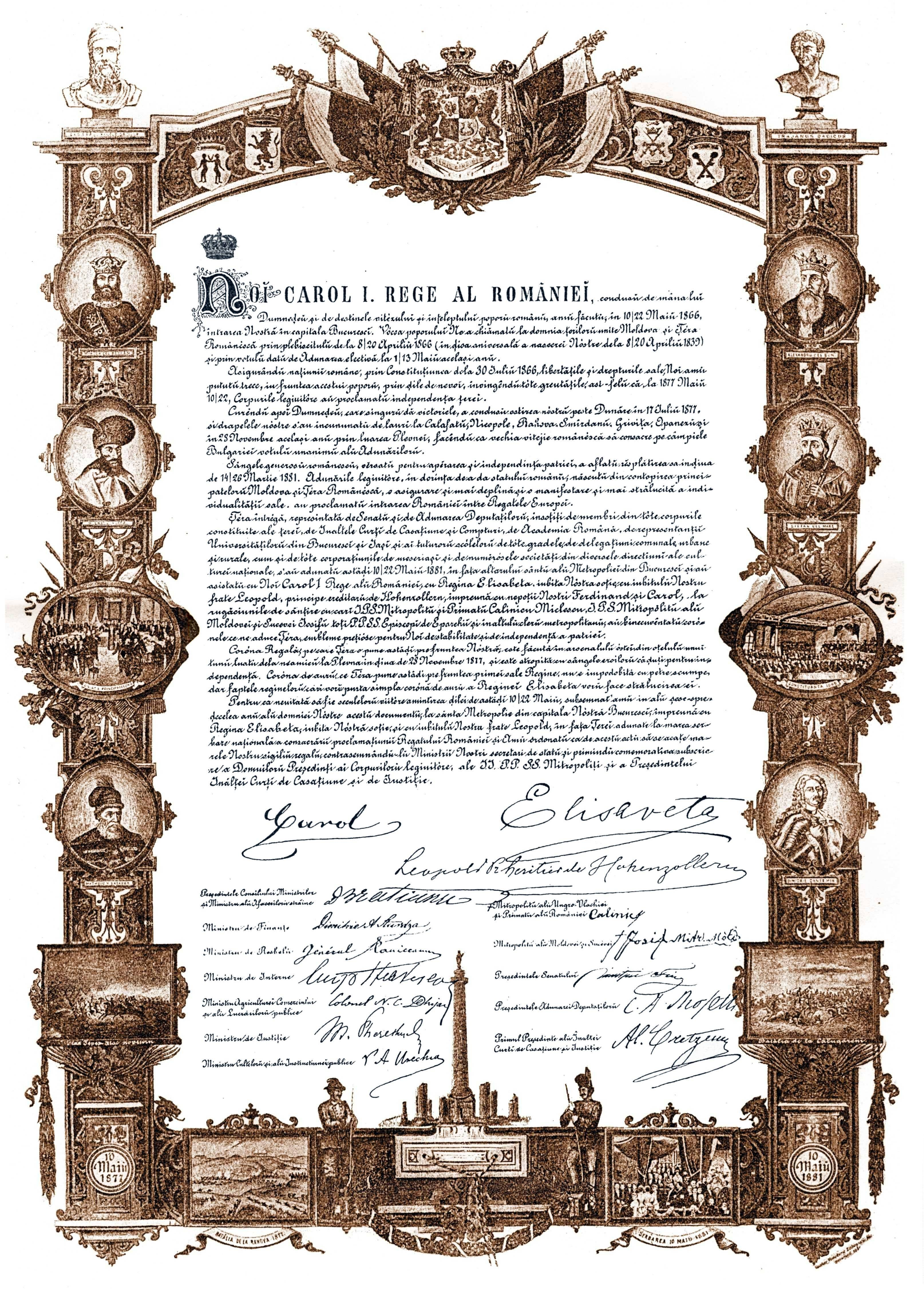
Proclamation Act of the Kingdom of Romania

The new state, squeezed between the Ottoman, Austro-Hungarian, and Russian Empires, with Slavic populations on its southwestern, southern, and northeastern borders, the Black Sea due east, and Hungarian neighbours on its western and northwestern borders, looked to the West, particularly France, for its cultural, educational, and administrative models.

Abstaining from the Initial Balkan War against the Ottoman Empire, the Kingdom of Romania entered the Second Balkan War in June 1913 against the Tsardom of Bulgaria. 330,000 Romanian troops moved across the Danube and into Bulgaria. One army occupied Southern Dobruja and another moved into northern Bulgaria to threaten Sofia, helping to bring an end to the war. Romania thus acquired the ethnically mixed territory of Southern Dobruja, which it had desired for years.

In 1916 Romania entered World War I on the Entente side. Romania engaged in a conflict against Bulgaria but as a result Bulgarian forces, after a series of successful battles, regained Dobruja, which had been previously ceded from Bulgaria by the treaty of Bucharest and the Berlin congress. Although the Romanian forces did not fare well militarily, by the end of the war the Austrian and Russian empires were gone; various assemblies proclaimed as representative bodies in Transylvania, Bessarabia and Bukovina decided on union with Romania. In 1919 by the Treaty of Saint-Germain and in 1920 by the Treaty of Trianon most of the territories claimed were assigned to Romania.

=== Old Kingdom (1881–1918) ===
The Romanian Old Kingdom (Romanian: Vechiul Regat or just Regat; German: Regat or Altreich) is a colloquial term referring to the territory covered by the first independent Romanian nation state, which was composed of the Danubian Principalities – Wallachia and Moldavia. It was achieved when, under the auspices of the Treaty of Paris (1856), the ad hoc Divans of both countries – which were under Imperial Ottoman suzerainty at the time – voted for Alexander Ioan Cuza as their prince, thus achieving a de facto unification. The region itself is defined by the result of that political act, followed by the inclusion of Northern Dobruja in 1878, the proclamation of the Kingdom of Romania in 1881, and the annexation of Southern Dobruja in 1913.

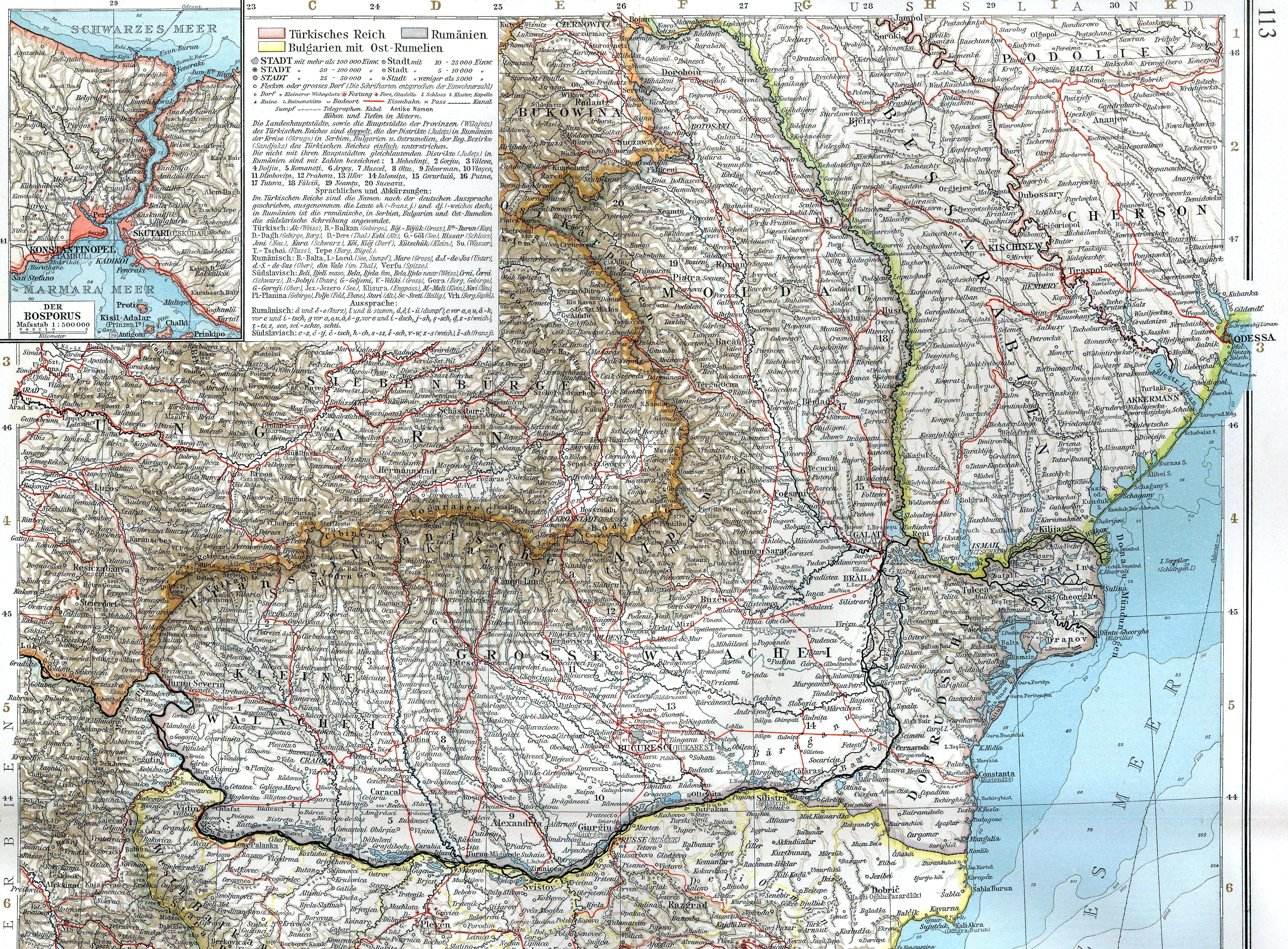
1901 German map of Romania

The term came into use after World War I, when the Old Kingdom was opposed to Greater Romania, which included Transylvania, Banat, Bessarabia, and Bukovina. Nowadays, the term is mainly of historical relevance, and is otherwise used as a common term for all regions in Romania included in both the Old Kingdom and present-day borders (namely: Wallachia, Moldavia, and Northern Dobruja).

=== World War I ===
Romania delayed in entering World War I, but ultimately declared war on the Central Powers in 1916. The Romanian military campaign ended in stalemate when the Central Powers quickly crushed the country's offensive into Transylvania and occupied Wallachia and Dobruja, including Bucharest and the strategically important oil fields, by the end of 1916. In 1917, despite fierce Romanian resistance, especially at the Battle of Mărășești, due to Russia's withdrawal from the war following the October Revolution, Romania, being almost completely surrounded by the Central Powers, was forced to also drop from the war, signing the Armistice of Focșani and next year, in May 1918, the Treaty of Bucharest. But after the successful offensive on the Thessaloniki front which put Bulgaria out of the war, Romania's government quickly reasserted control and put an army back into the field on 10 November 1918, a day before the war ended in Western Europe. Following the proclamation of the union of Transylvania with the Kingdom of Romania on 1 December 1918 by the representatives of Transylvanian Romanians gathered at Alba Iulia, Transylvania was soon united with the Kingdom, as was Bessarabia earlier in 1918, since the power vacuum in Russia caused by the civil war there allowed the Sfatul Țării, or National Council, to proclaim the union of Bessarabia with Romania. War with the Hungarian Soviet Republic in 1919 resulted in the occupation of Budapest by Romanian troops and the end of Béla Kun's Bolshevik regime.

=== Greater Romania ===
==== Union with Bessarabia, Bukovina and Transylvania ====
At the Paris Peace Conference, Romania received the territories of Transylvania, part of Banat and other territories from Hungary, as well as Bessarabia (Eastern Moldavia between Prut and Dniester rivers) and Bukovina. In the Treaty of Trianon, Hungary renounced in favor of Romania all the claims of the Austro-Hungarian Monarchy over Transylvania. The union of Romania with Bukovina was ratified in 1919 in the Treaty of Saint Germain, and in 1920 some of the Western powers recognized Romanian rule over Bessarabia by the Treaty of Paris. Thus, Romania in 1920 was more than twice the size it had been in 1914. The last territorial change during this period came in 1923, when a few border settlements were exchanged between Romania and Kingdom of Serbs, Croats and Slovenes. The most notable Romanian acquisition was the town of Jimbolia, while the most notable Yugoslav acquisition was the town of Jaša Tomić.

Romania made no further territorial claims; nonetheless the kingdom's expansion aroused enmity from several of its neighbors, including Bulgaria, the Soviet Union, and especially Hungary. (Note: The Treaty of Paris – recognizing the union with Bessarabia – never came into effect because one of its signatories, Japan, refused to ratify it. This meant that the union was not recognized by the international community, making it – unlike the other provinces – more of a de facto union than an official, de jure one. Furthermore, President Woodrow Wilson left the peace conference to emphasize his disagreements earlier in 1919, and because the U.S. Congress did not ratify the Treaty of Trianon, the United States of America and the Kingdom of Hungary signed a separate peace treaty on 29 August 1921.) Greater Romania now had a significant minority population, especially of Hungarians, and faced the difficulty of assimilation. Transylvania had significant Hungarian and German population who were accustomed to being the power structure; with a historically contemptuous attitude towards Romanians, they now feared reprisals. Both groups were effectively excluded from politics as the postwar regime passed an edict stating that all personnel employed by the state had to speak Romanian. The new state was also a highly centralized one, so it was unlikely that the Hungarian or German minorities would exercise political influence without personal connections in the government in Bucharest. Despite these policies, the Romanian government permitted both Germans and Hungarians the freedom to have separate schools, publications and judicial hearings in their respective languages. These rights were not extended to other minorities, Jews in particular.

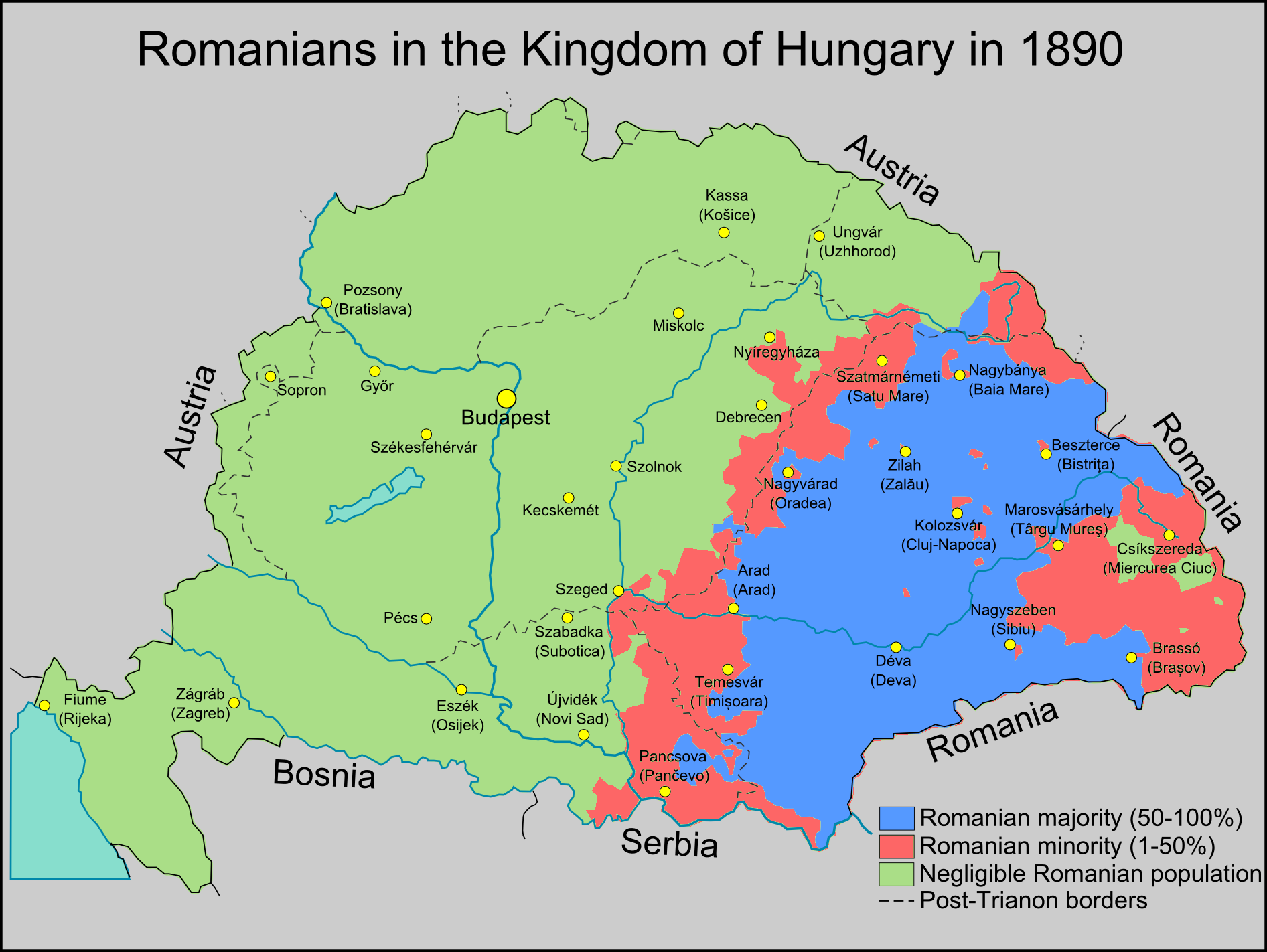
Ethnic map of Romanians within the Kingdom of Hungary in 1890

==== The interbellum years ====
The resulting Great Union did not survive World War II. Until 1938, Romania's governments maintained the form, if not always the substance, of a liberal constitutional monarchy. The National Liberal Party, dominant in the years immediately after World War I, became increasingly clientelist and nationalist, and in 1927 was supplanted in power by the National Peasants' Party. Between 1930 and 1940 there were over 25 separate governments; on several occasions in the last few years before World War II, the rivalry between the fascist Iron Guard and other political groupings approached the level of a civil war.

Upon the death of King Ferdinand in 1927, his son, Prince Carol, was prevented from succeeding him because of previous marital scandals that had resulted in his renunciation of rights to the throne. After living three years in exile, with his brother Nicolae serving as regent and his young son Michael as king, Carol changed his mind and with the support of the ruling National Peasants' Party he returned and proclaimed himself king.

Iuliu Maniu, leader of the National Peasants' Party, engineered Carol's return on the basis of a promise that he would forsake his mistress Magda Lupescu, and Lupescu herself had agreed to the arrangement. However, it became clear upon Carol's first re-encounter with his former wife, Elena, that he had no interest in a reconciliation with her, and Carol soon arranged for Magda Lupescu's return to his side. Her unpopularity was a millstone around Carol's neck for the rest of his reign, particularly because she was widely viewed as his closest advisor and confidante. Maniu and his National Peasant Party shared the same general political aims as the Iron Guard: both fought against the corruption and dictatorial policies of King Carol II and the National Liberal Party.

The worldwide Great Depression that started in 1929 and was also present in Romania destabilised the country. The early 1930s were marked by social unrest, high unemployment, and strikes. In several instances, the Romanian government violently repressed strikes and riots, notably the 1929 miners' strike in Valea Jiului and the strike in the Grivița railroad workshops. In the mid-1930s, the Romanian economy recovered and the industry grew significantly, although about 80% of Romanians were still employed in agriculture. French economic and political influence was predominant in the early 1920s but then Germany became more dominant, especially in the 1930s.

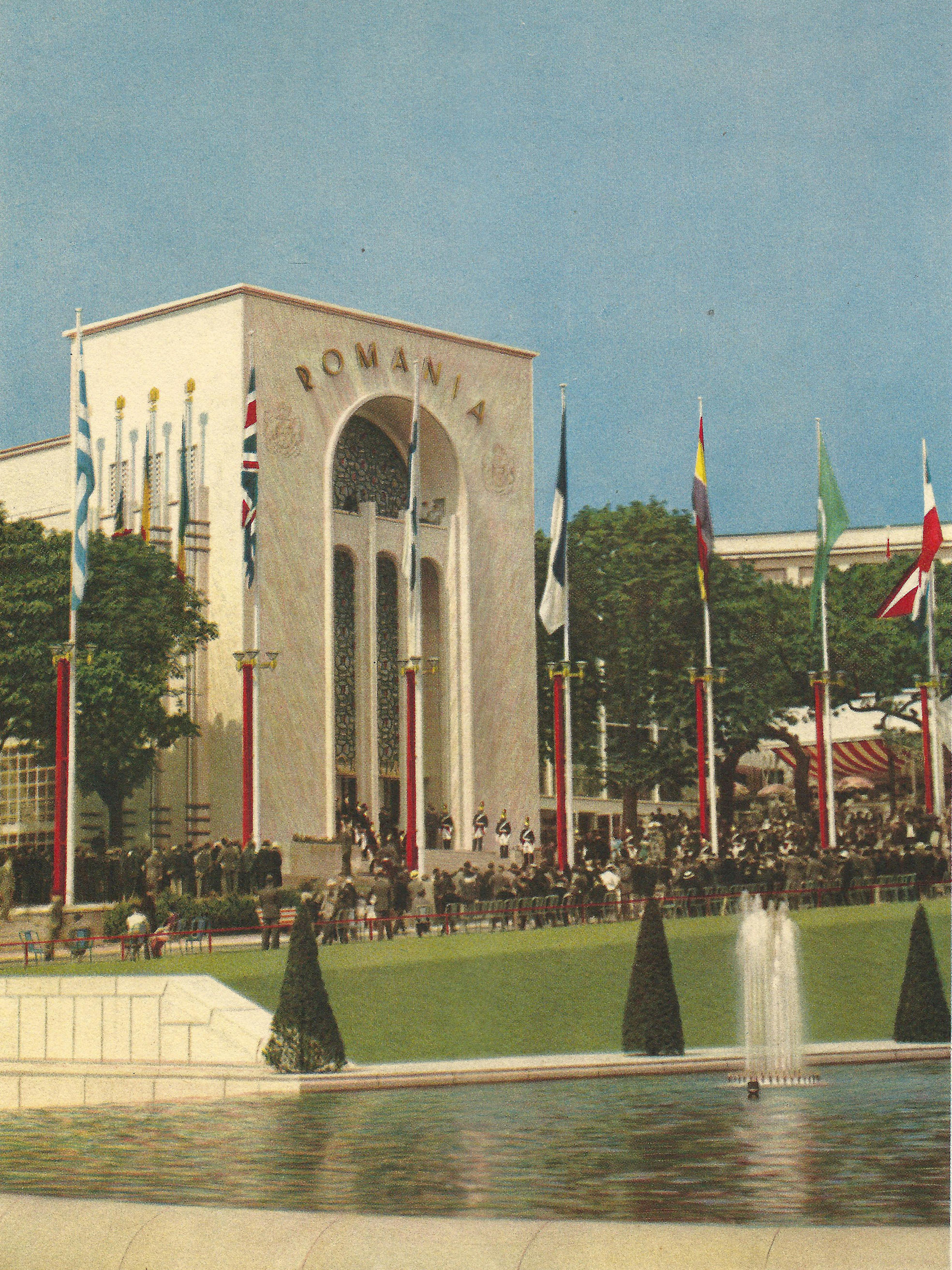
Romanian pavilion at EXPO Paris 1937

As the 1930s progressed, Romania's already shaky democracy slowly deteriorated toward fascist dictatorship. The constitution of 1923 gave the king free rein to dissolve parliament and call elections at will; as a result, Romania experienced over 25 governments in a single decade.

Increasingly, these governments were dominated by a number of anti-Semitic, ultra-nationalist, and mostly at least quasi-fascist parties. The National Liberal Party steadily became more nationalistic than liberal, but nonetheless lost its dominance over Romanian politics. It was eclipsed by parties like the (relatively moderate) National Peasants' Party and its more radical Romanian Front offshoot, the National-Christian Defense League (LANC) and the Iron Guard. In 1935, LANC merged with the National Agrarian Party to form the National Christian Party (NCP). The quasi-mystical fascist Iron Guard was an earlier LANC offshoot that, even more than these other parties, exploited nationalist feelings, fear of communism, and resentment of alleged foreign and Jewish domination of the economy.

Already the Iron Guard had embraced the politics of assassination, and various governments had reacted more or less in kind. On 10 December 1933, Liberal prime minister Ion Duca "dissolved" the Iron Guard, arresting thousands; consequently, 19 days later he was assassinated by Iron Guard legionnaires.

Throughout the 1930s, these nationalist parties had a mutually distrustful relationship with King Carol II. Nonetheless, in December 1937, the king appointed National Christian Party leader, the poet Octavian Goga, as prime minister of Romania's first Fascist government. Around this time, Carol met with Adolf Hitler, who expressed his wish to see a Romanian government headed by the pro-Nazi Iron Guard. Instead, on 10 February 1938 King Carol II used the occasion of a public insult by Goga toward Lupescu as a reason to dismiss the government and institute a short-lived royal dictatorship, sanctioned 17 days later by a new constitution under which the king named personally not only the prime minister but all the ministers.

In April 1938, King Carol had Iron Guard leader Corneliu Zelea Codreanu (aka "The Captain") arrested and imprisoned. On the night of 29–30 November 1938, Codreanu and several other legionnaires were killed while purportedly attempting to escape from prison. It is generally agreed that there was no such escape attempt, but that they were murdered in retaliation for a series of assassinations by Iron Guard commandos.

The royal dictatorship was brief. On 7 March 1939, a new government was formed with Armand Călinescu as prime minister; on 21 September 1939, three weeks after the start of World War II, Călinescu, in turn, was also assassinated by legionnaires avenging Codreanu's murder.

In 1939, Germany and the Soviet Union signed the Molotov–Ribbentrop Pact, which stipulated, among other things, the Soviet "interest" in Bessarabia. After the 1940 territorial losses and growing increasingly unpopular, Carol was compelled to abdicate and name general Ion Antonescu as the new Prime-Minister with full powers in ruling the state by royal decree.

== Economy ==
=== Pre-Kingdom Era to World War I ===
At the time of the proclamation of the Kingdom, there were already several industrial facilities in the country: The Assan and Olamazu steam mills, built in 1853 and 1862 respectively, a brick factory built in 1865, and two sugar factories built in 1873, among others. In 1857, the first oil refinery in the world was built at Ploiești. In 1880, after several railways were built, the CFR was founded. After proclamation of the Kingdom, the pre-established industrial facilities began to be highly developed: 6 more, larger, sugar factories were built and the railway network was expanded more. Another, more modern brick factory was built in 1891.

=== Agriculture ===
Despite all of these industrial achievements, the overwhelming majority of Romania's economy remained agricultural. In 1919, a staggering 72% of Romanians were engaged in agriculture. The Romanian peasantry was among the poorest in the region, a situation aggravated by one of Europe's highest birth rates. Farming was primitive and machinery and chemical fertilizers almost unheard of. The Regat (prewar Romania) was traditionally a land of large estates worked by peasants who either had little or no land of their own. The situation in Transylvania and Bessarabia was marginally better. After peasant calls for land reform snowballed into an avalanche, King Ferdinand had to oblige, especially once the Russian Revolution had encouraged peasants to take the matter in their own hands. The land reform passed in 1921 accomplished little however. Large landowners still controlled up to 30% of Romania's land, including the forests peasants depended on for fuel. The redistributed plots were invariably too small to feed their owners and most peasants could not overcome their tradition of growing grain over cash crops. Nothing was done to remedy basic problems such as rural overpopulation and technological backwardness. Draft animals were rare, to say nothing of machinery, actual productivity was worse than before. Romanian agriculture struggled in the international market, and with the onset of the Great Depression, collapsed completely.

=== Expansion and growth ===
Romania's 1913 GDP at the 1990 exchange rate amounted to $11.7 billion. However, the 1990 dollar was 9.27 times weaker than the 1938 dollar. Thus, Romania's 1913 GDP at the 1938 exchange rate amounted to $1.262 billion.

The 1938 Romanian GDP amounted to 387.204 billion lei, with a GDP per capita of 20,487 lei at an estimated population of 18.9 million. The 1938 average exchange rate was of 1 leu for US$0.00732. Romania's 1938 GDP thus amounted to $2.834 billion.

Romania's public debt as of 1 April 1938 amounted to 112,267,290,144 lei, of which 78,398,078,964 lei consisted of external debt. Total public debt thus amounted to 29% of Romania's 1938 GDP, while public external debt amounted to just over 20%.

=== Industrial development ===
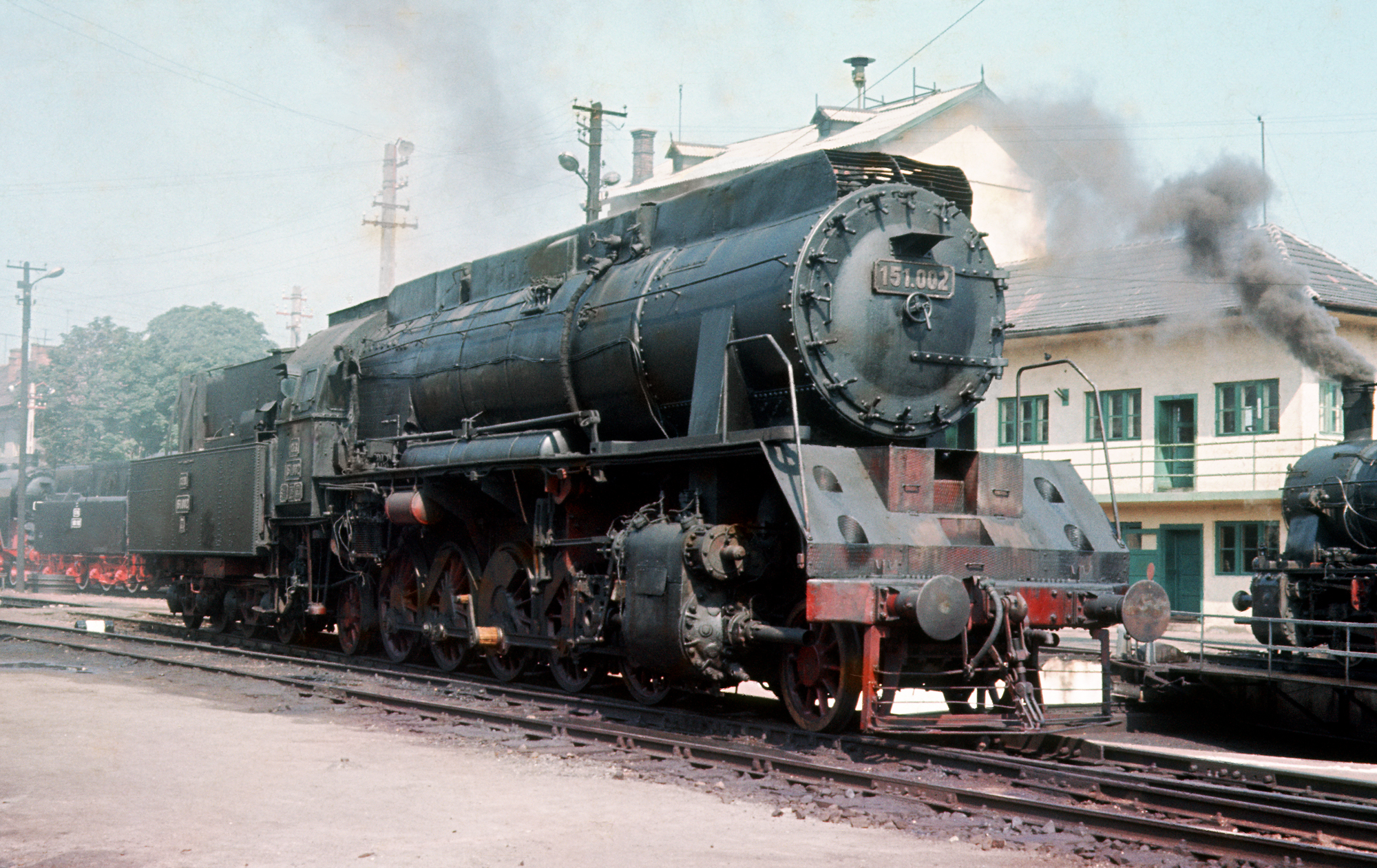
The Malaxa Prime, a Romanian-made steel-wrought locomotive

Despite the destruction provoked by the First World War, Romanian industry proceeded to significantly grow, due to a result of new establishments and development of the older ones. The MALAXA industrial engineering and manufacturing company was established in 1921 by Romanian industrialist Nicolae Malaxa and dealt especially with rolling stock maintenance and manufacturing. It developed rapidly, and by 1930 Romania had managed to cease importing locomotives altogether, all required rolling stock being supplied by the local industry. Industrial facilities acquired along with the new provinces, such as the Reșița works, also contributed to the rapid development of Romanian heavy industry. Other important establishments were the Copșa Mică works, producing non-ferrous metals and the Romanian Optical Enterprise. Construction also developed, as great monuments like the Caraiman Cross (1928), Arcul de Triumf (1936), and the Mausoleum of Mărășești (1938) were erected. The oil industry was also greatly expanded, making Romania one of the top oil exporters by the late 1930s, which also attracted German and Italian interest.

In 1938, Romania produced 6.6 million tons of crude oil, 284,000 tons of crude steel, 133,000 tons of pig iron, 510,000 tons of cement, and 289,000 tons of rolled steel.

=== Armament industry ===
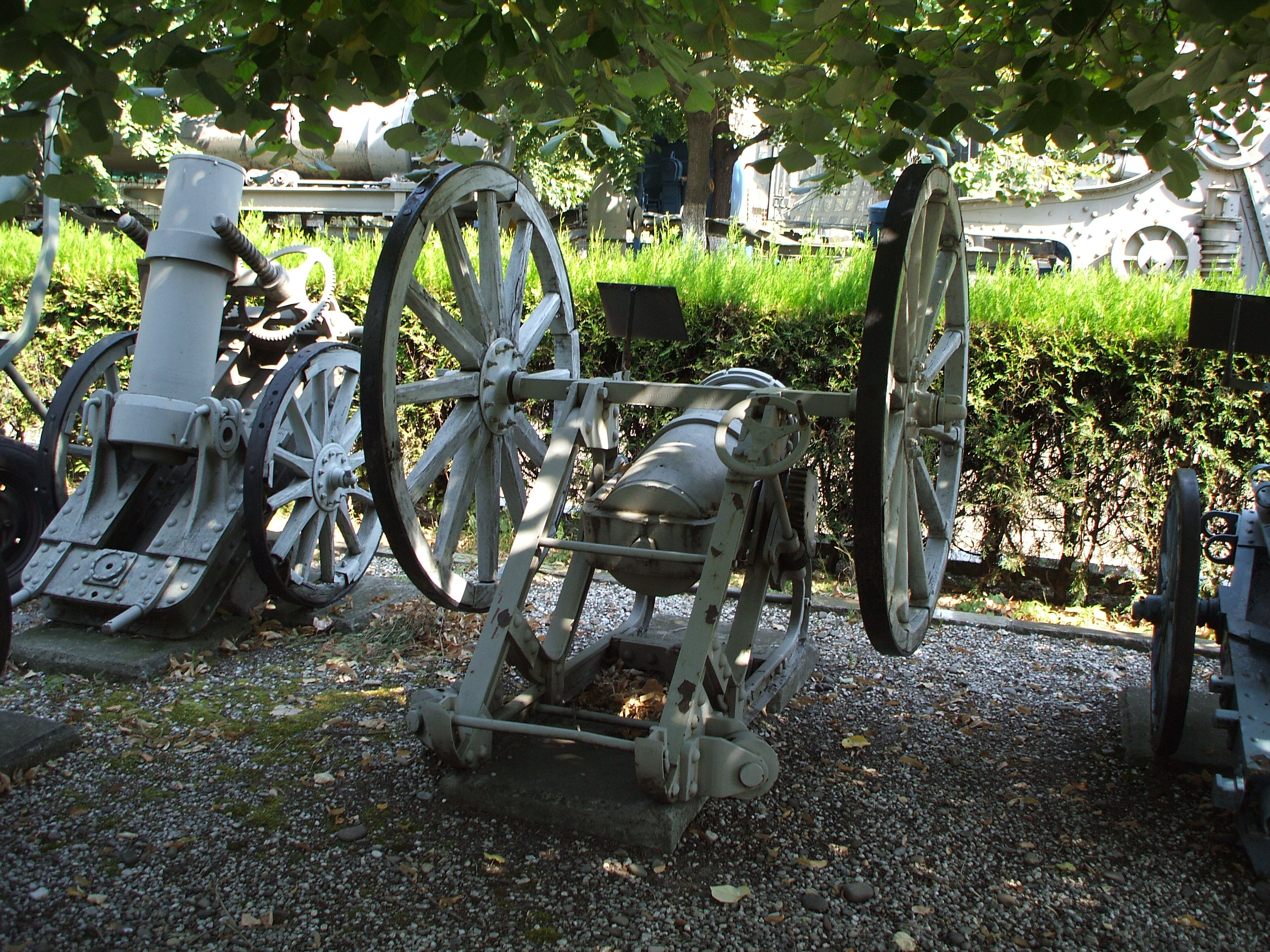
250 mm Negrei mortar

Romanian military industry during World War I was mainly focused on converting various fortification guns into field and anti-aircraft artillery. Up to 334 German 53 mm Fahrpanzer guns, 93 French 57 mm Hotchkiss guns, 66 Krupp 150 mm guns and dozens more 210 mm guns were mounted on Romanian-built carriages and transformed into mobile field artillery, with 45 Krupp 75 mm guns and 132 Hotchkiss 57 mm guns being transformed into anti-aircraft artillery. The Romanians also upgraded 120 German Krupp 105 mm howitzers, the result being the most effective field howitzer in Europe at that time. Romania even managed to design and build from scratch its own model of mortar, the 250 mm Negrei Model 1916. Other Romanian technological assets include the building of Vlaicu III, the world's first aircraft made of metal. The Romanian Navy possessed the largest warships on the Danube. They were a class of 4 river monitors, built locally at the Galați shipyard using parts manufactured in Austria-Hungary, and the first one launched was Lascăr Catargiu, in 1907. The Romanian monitors displaced almost 700 tons, were armed with three 120 mm naval guns in 3 turrets, two 120 mm naval howitzers, four 47 mm anti-aircraft guns and two 6.5 machine guns. The monitors took part in the Battle of Turtucaia and the First Battle of Cobadin. The Romanian-designed Schneider 150 mm Model 1912 howitzer was considered one of the most modern field guns on the Western Front.

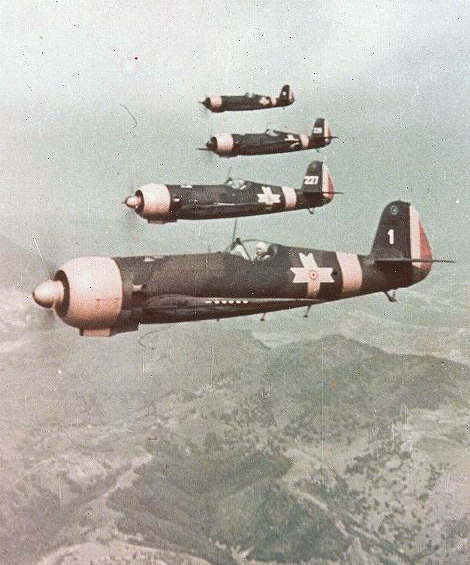
A formation of IAR-80 fighter aircraft

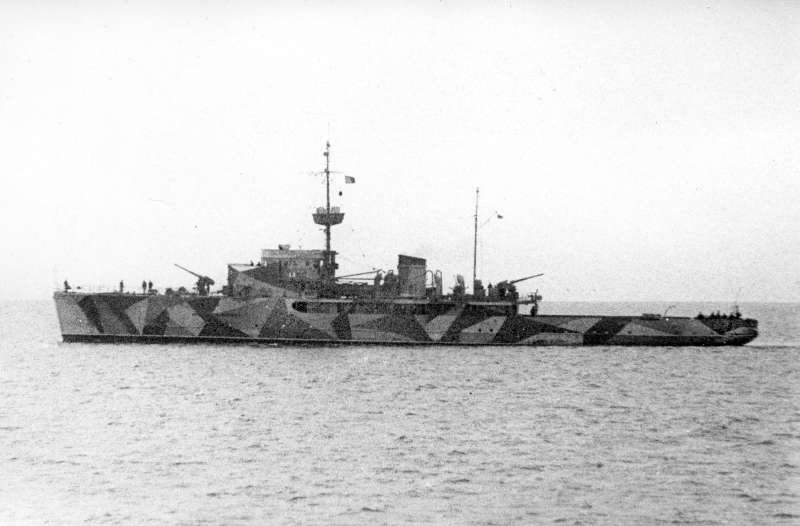
Minelayer NMS Amiral Murgescu

The Romanian armament industry was expanded greatly during the Interwar period and World War II. New factories were constructed, such as the Industria Aeronautică Română and Societatea Pentru Exploatări Tehnice aircraft factories, which produced hundreds of indigenous aircraft, such as IAR 37, IAR 80, and SET 7. Before the war, Romania acquired from France the licence to produce hundreds of Brandt Mle 27/31 and Brandt Mle 1935 mortars, with hundreds more produced during the war, and also the licence to produce 140 French 47 mm Schneider anti-tank guns at the Concordia factory, with 118 produced between 26 May 1939 and 1 August 1940 and hundreds more produced during the war; these guns were to be towed by Malaxa Tip UE armored carriers, built since late 1939 at the Malaxa factory under French licence, eventually 126 being built until March 1941. Czechoslovak licence was acquired in 1938 to produce the ZB vz. 30 machine gun, with 5,000 being built at the Cugir gun factory until the start of Operation Barbarossa in June 1941. Romania also acquired the licence to produce the R-1 tankette, but ultimately only one prototype was built locally. German licence was acquired in 1938 to produce 360 37 mm Rheinmetall anti-aircraft guns, but only 102 were produced until May 1941. British licence was acquired to produce 100 Vickers Model 1931 75 mm anti-aircraft guns at the Reșița works, with the first battery of 6 guns entering service on 1 August 1939, and 100 more guns were built during the war for a total production of 200. On 14 June, Romania launched the first locally-built warship, the minelayer NMS Amiral Murgescu.

During the war, Romania copied and produced hundreds of Soviet M1938 mortars, as well as designing and producing up to 400 75 mm Reșița Model 1943 anti-tank guns. Infantry weapons designed and produced by Romania during the war include the Orița M1941 sub-machinegun and the Argeș flamethrower. Romania also built 30 Vănătorul de care R-35, 34 TACAM T-60, 21 TACAM R-2 tank destroyers and rebuilt 34 captured Soviet Komsomolets armored tractors. A few prototype vehicles were also built, such as the Mareșal tank destroyer, which is credited with being the inspiration for the German Hetzer, a Renault R-35 tank with a T-26 turret and an artillery tractor known as T-1. Warships built include the submarines NMS Rechinul and NMS Marsuinul, a class of 4 minesweepers, 6 Dutch-designed torpedo boats and 2 gunboats.

== Demographics ==
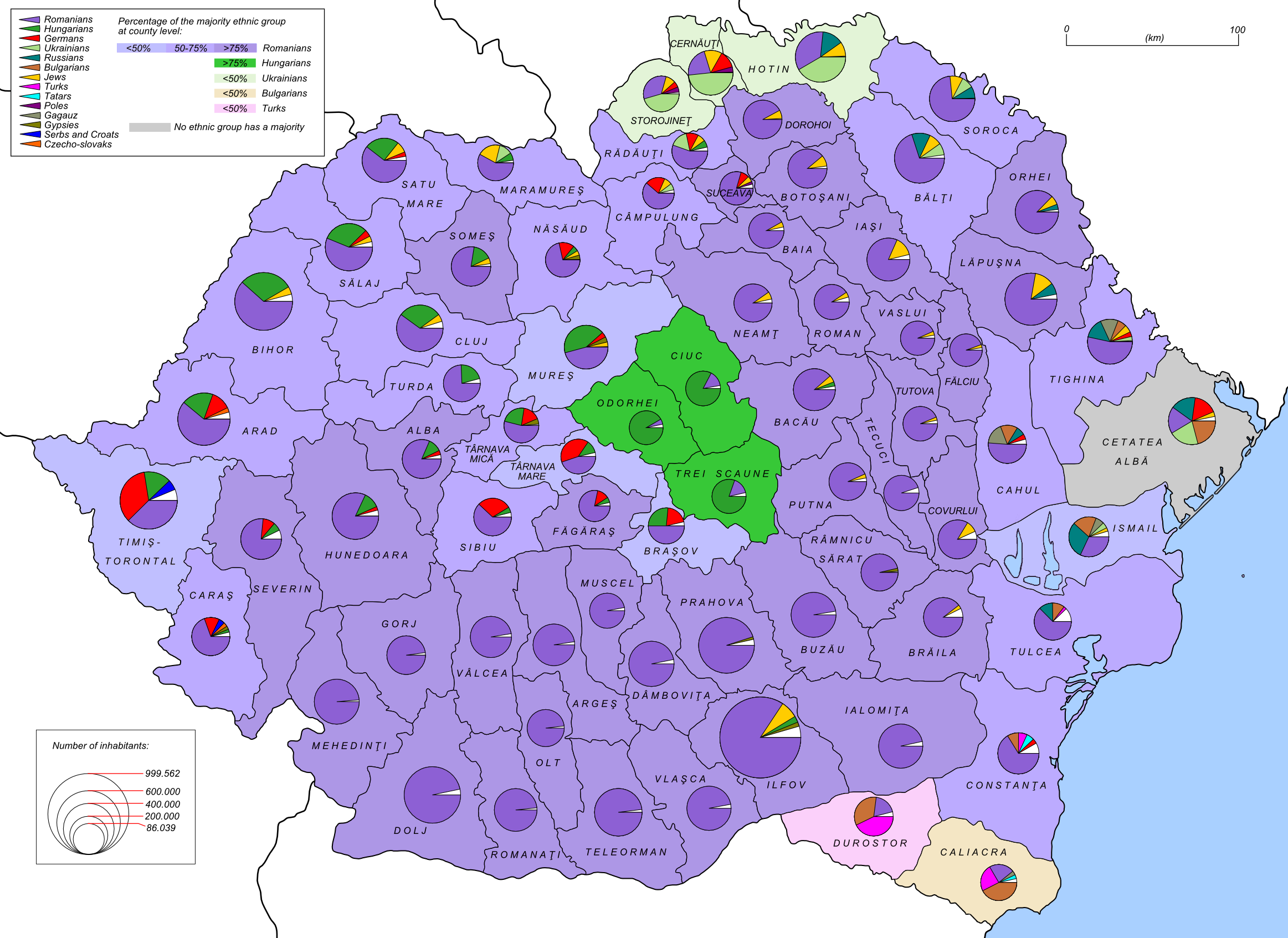
Ethnic map (1930 census)

According to the 1930 Romanian Census, Romania had a population of 18,057,028. Romanians made up 71.9% of the population and 28.1% of the population were ethnic minorities.

Population of Romania according to ethnic group in 1930
Ethnicity	number	%
Romanians	12,981,324	71.9
Hungarians	1,425,507	7.9
Germans	745,421	4.1
Jews	728,115	4
Ruthenians and Ukrainians	582,115	3.2
Russians	409,150	2.3
Bulgarians	366,384	2
Romani	262,501	1.5
Turks	154,772	0.9
Gagauzes	105,750	0.6
Czechs and Slovaks	51,842	0.3
Serbs, Croats and Slovenes	51,062	0.3
Poles	48,310	0.3
Greeks	26,495	0.1
Tatars	22,141	0.1
Armenians	15,544	0.0
Hutsuls	12,456	0.0
Albanians	4,670	0.0
Others	56,355	0.3
Undeclared	7,114	0.0
Total	18,057,028	100

=== Cities ===
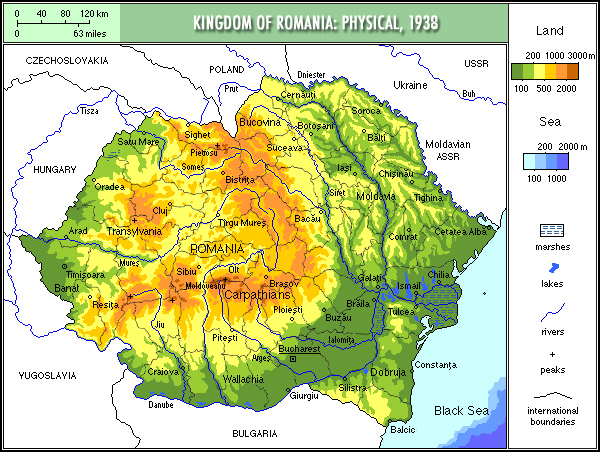
Physical map of Romania in 1939

Largest cities as per 1930 census:

Rank	Name	Population
1	Bucharest	570,881 (639,040^{1})
2	Chișinău (now located in Moldova)	114,896
3	Cernăuți (now located in Ukraine)	112,427
4	Iași	102,872
5	Cluj	100,844
6	Galați	100,611
7	Timișoara	91,580

Notes: 1 - including 12 suburban communities.

Two of Romania's seven largest cities in 1930 are currently located outside of Romania as a result of World War II border changes.

=== Education ===
Literacy rate in interwar Romania (1930)

While the Romanian nobility had a long tradition of sending their sons to Europe's finest schools, the educated were otherwise a tiny minority. Transylvania had the most educated population in Greater Romania, while Bessarabia fared the worst. While legally all Romanians were required to undergo at least four years of schooling, in practice few actually did and the system was designed to separate those who would go on to higher education from those who would not. While this was partially necessary due to limited resources, it ensured that peasants had almost no chance of becoming educated.

High school and college education in Romania was modeled after the French system. Students undertook a rigid curriculum based around the liberal arts. Romania suffered from the same problem as the rest of Eastern Europe, which was that most students, coming from aristocratic backgrounds, preferred to study subjects such as theology, philosophy, literature and the fine arts over science, business, and engineering.

== Administrative division ==
After Independence, the Romanian Old Kingdom was divided into 33 counties.

After World War I, as a result of the 1925 administrative unification law, the territory was divided into 71 counties, 489 districts (plăși) and 8,879 communes.

In 1938, King Carol II promulgated a new Constitution, and subsequently he had the administrative division of the Romanian territory changed. Ten ținuturi (approximate translation: "lands") were created (by merging the counties) to be ruled by rezidenți regali (approximate translation: "Royal Residents") - appointed directly by the King. This administrative reform did not last and the counties were re-established after the fall of Carol's regime.

=== Maps ===
Administrative map of Romania in 1881–1913

Administrative map of Romania in 1925–1938

Regions (Ținuturi) of Romania in 1938–1940

Romania in 1942

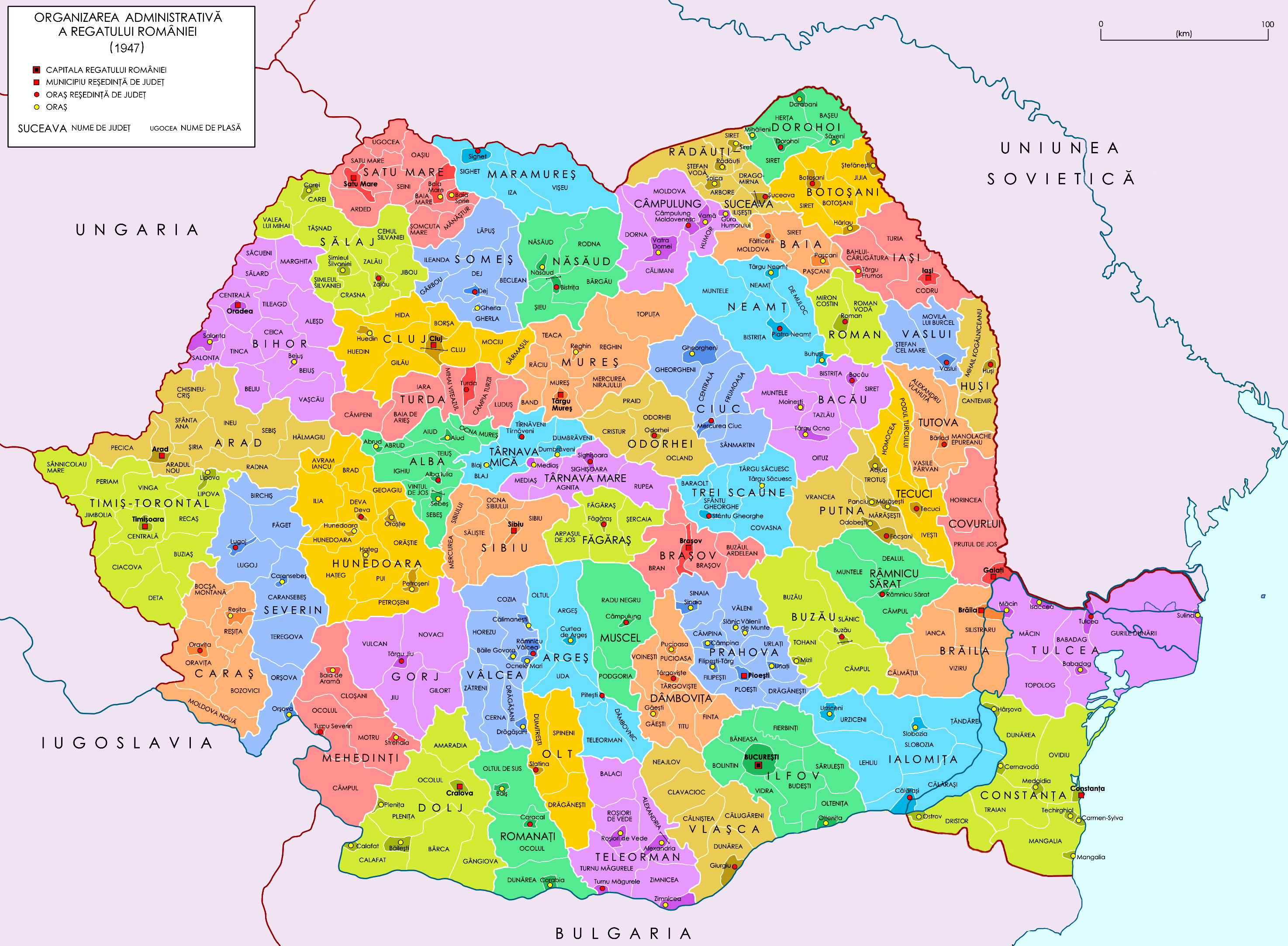
Kingdom of Romania in 1947

== Timeline (1859–1940) ==
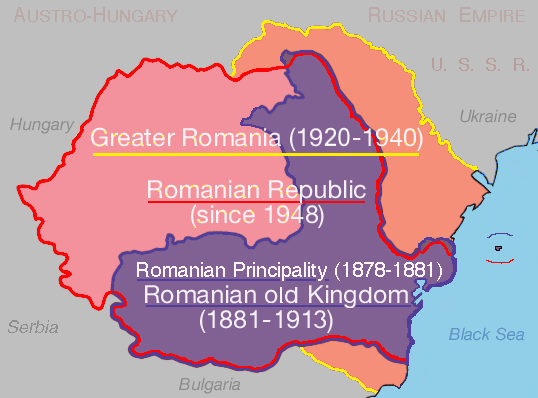
Romanian territory during the 20th century: purple indicates the Old Kingdom before 1913, orange indicates Greater Romania areas that joined or were annexed after the Second Balkan War and World War I but were lost after World War II, and rose indicates areas that joined Romania after World War I and remained so after World War II.

Timeline of the borders of Romania between 1859 and 2010

• 1859 –
Alexander John Cuza unites Moldavia and Wallachia under his personal rule.
• 1862 –
Formal union of Moldavia and Wallachia to form principality of Romania.
• 1866 –
Cuza forced to abdicate and a foreign dynasty is established. Carol I signed the first modern Constitution.
• 1877 –
16 April. Treaty by which the Russian troops are allowed to pass through Romanian territory
24 April. Russia declares war on the Ottoman Empire and its troops enter Romania
9 May. Romanian independence declared by the Romanian parliament, start of Romanian War of Independence
10 May. Carol I ratifies independence declaration
• 1878 –
Under Treaty of Berlin, Ottoman Empire recognizes Romanian independence. Romania ceded southern Bessarabia to Russia.
• 1881 –
Carol I was proclaimed King of Romania on 14 March.
• 1894 –
Leaders of the Transylvanian Romanians who sent a Memorandum to the Austrian Emperor demanding national rights for the Romanians are found guilty of treason.
• 1907 –
Violent peasant revolts crushed throughout Romania, thousands of persons killed.
• 1914 –
Death of Carol I, succeeded by his nephew Ferdinand.
• 1916 –
August. Romania enters World War I on the Entente side.
December. Romanian Treasure sent to Russia for safekeeping but was seized by Soviets after the Romanian army refused to withdraw from Bessarabia.
• 1918 –
27 March. The union of Bessarabia with Romania is proclaimed.

28 November. The union of Bukovina with Romania is declared.

1 December. The union of Transylvania with Romania is declared. This day concludes a series of unifications between the Kingdom of Romania and its claimed historical regions. However, the terms of these proclamations (and, subsequently, the materialization of the Greater Romania ideal) would only be de facto recognized 2 years later, following the Treaty of Trianon.

By the Treaty of Versailles, Romania agreed to grant citizenship to the former citizens of Russian and Austro-Hungarian Empires living in the new Romanian territories.
• 1919 –
A military conflict occurs between Romania and Hungarian Soviet Republic led by Béla Kun. The Romanian Army takes over Budapest on 4 August 1919. The city is ruled by a military administration until 16 November 1919.
The Treaty of Saint-Germain-en-Laye officially assigns Bukovina to Romania.
• 1920 –
The Treaty of Trianon officially assigns Transylvania, Banat and Partium to Romania.
Little Entente alliance with Czechoslovakia and Yugoslavia initiated.
• 1921 –
A major and radical agrarian reform.
Polish–Romanian alliance established.
• 1923 –
The 1923 Constitution is adopted based on a National Liberal Party project.
National-Christian Defense League (LANC) founded.
• 1924 –
LANC member (later Iron Guard founder) Corneliu Zelea Codreanu assassinates the Prefect of Police in Iași, but is acquitted.
• 1926 –
Liberal Electoral Law adopted.
Franco-Romanian Treaty.
• 1927 –
The National Peasants' Party takes over the government from the National Liberal Party.
The Legion of the Archangel Michael, later the Iron Guard, splits from LANC.
Michael (Mihai) becomes king under a regency regime.
• 1929 –
Beginning of the Great Depression in the world and in Romania.
• 1930 –
Carol II crowned King.
• 1931 –
First ban on Iron Guard.
• 1933 –
16 February. Grivița Railcar Workshops strike violently put down by police.
10 December. Prime Minister Ion Duca "dissolves" the Iron Guard, arresting thousands; 19 days later he is assassinated by Iron Guard legionnaires.
• 1935 –
LANC and National Agrarian Party merge to form the fascist National Christian Party (NCP).
• 1937 –
Electoral "non-aggression pact" between the National Peasants' Party and Iron Guard, later adding the Agrarian Union. Romanian Communist Party denounces pact, but, in practice, supports the National-Peasants.
LANC forms government, but is rapidly in conflict with Carol II over his Jewish mistress.
• 1938 –
10 February. Royal dictatorship declared. New constitution adopted 27 February.
29–30 November. Iron Guard leader Codreanu and other legionnaires shot on the King's orders.
• 1939 –
7 March. Armand Călinescu forms government.
23 August. Molotov–Ribbentrop Pact stipulates Soviet "interest" in Bessarabia.
1 September. Germany and Soviet Union invades Poland. Start of World War II.
21 September. Călinescu assassinated by Iron Guard legionnaires.
• 1940 –
6 September. After the forced abdication of King Carol II, his 19-year-old son Michael I assumes the throne, being obliged to grant dictatorial powers to Prime Minister and Conducător Ion Antonescu.
14 September. The Kingdom of Romania is supplanted by a short-lived dictatorship called the National Legionary State.

Selection of newspapers of the Kingdom of Romania

Alegătorul liber, January 23, 1875

Bukarester Tagblatt, August 10, 1880 (in German)

Voința naționala, November 1, 1884

Opinia, August 22, 1913

== Monarchs ==
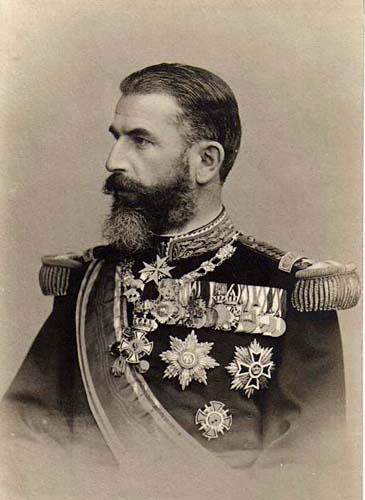
King Carol I (1881–1914)

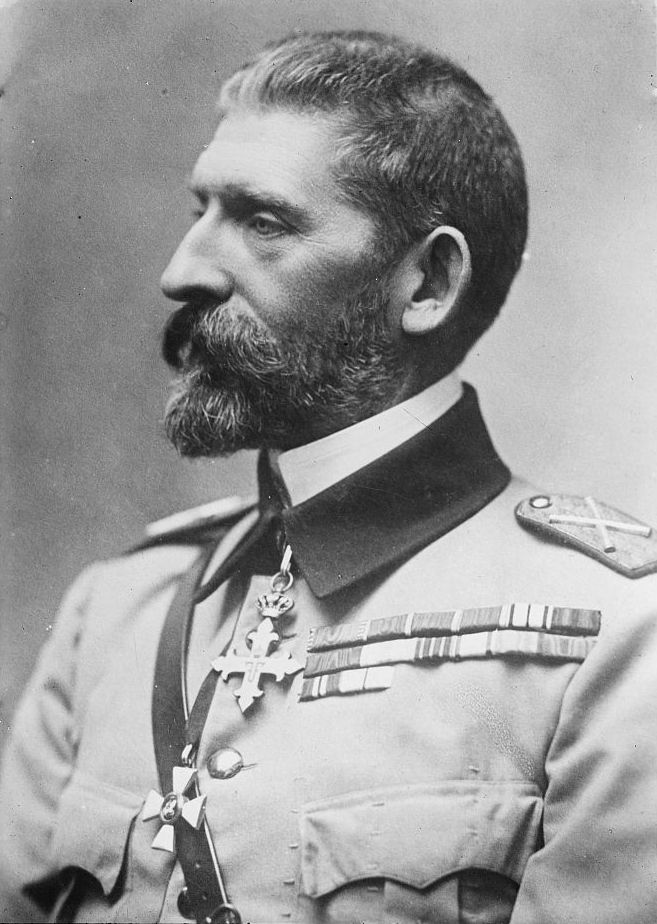
King Ferdinand I (1914–1927)

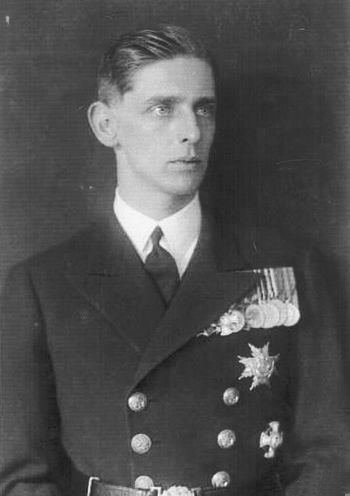
Prince Nicholas (Regent) (1927–1930)

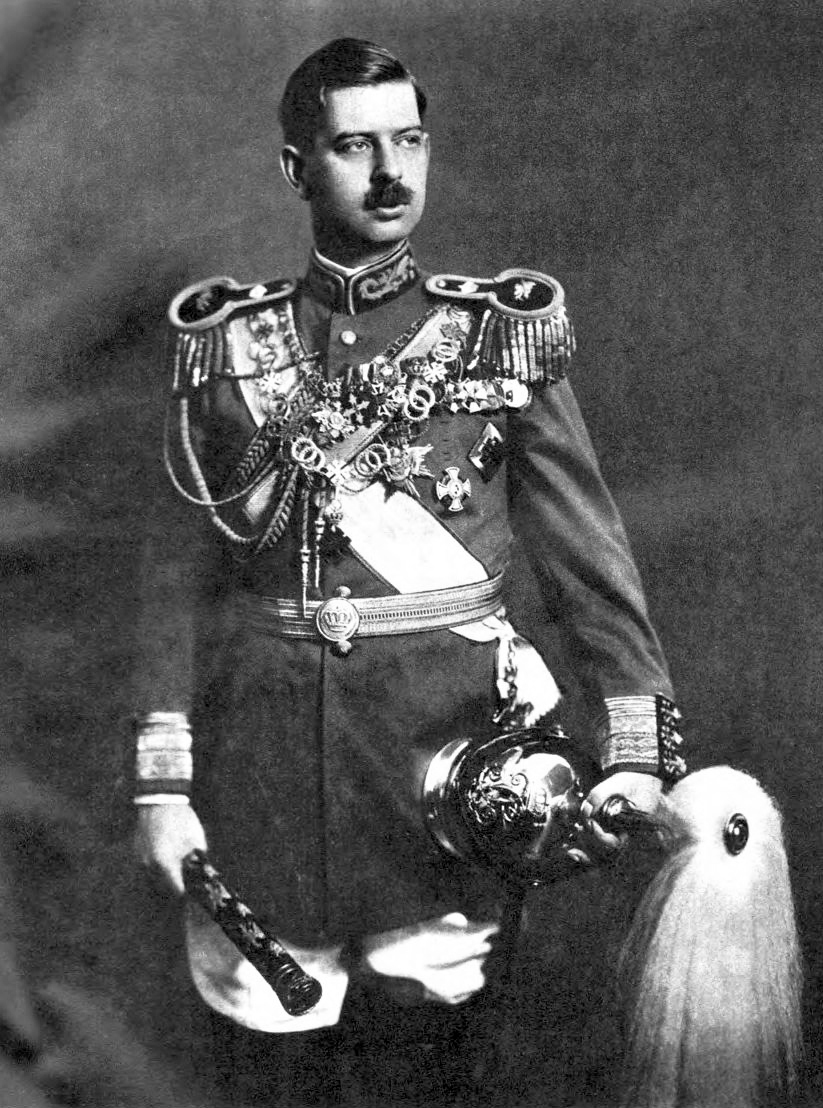
King Carol II (1930–1940)

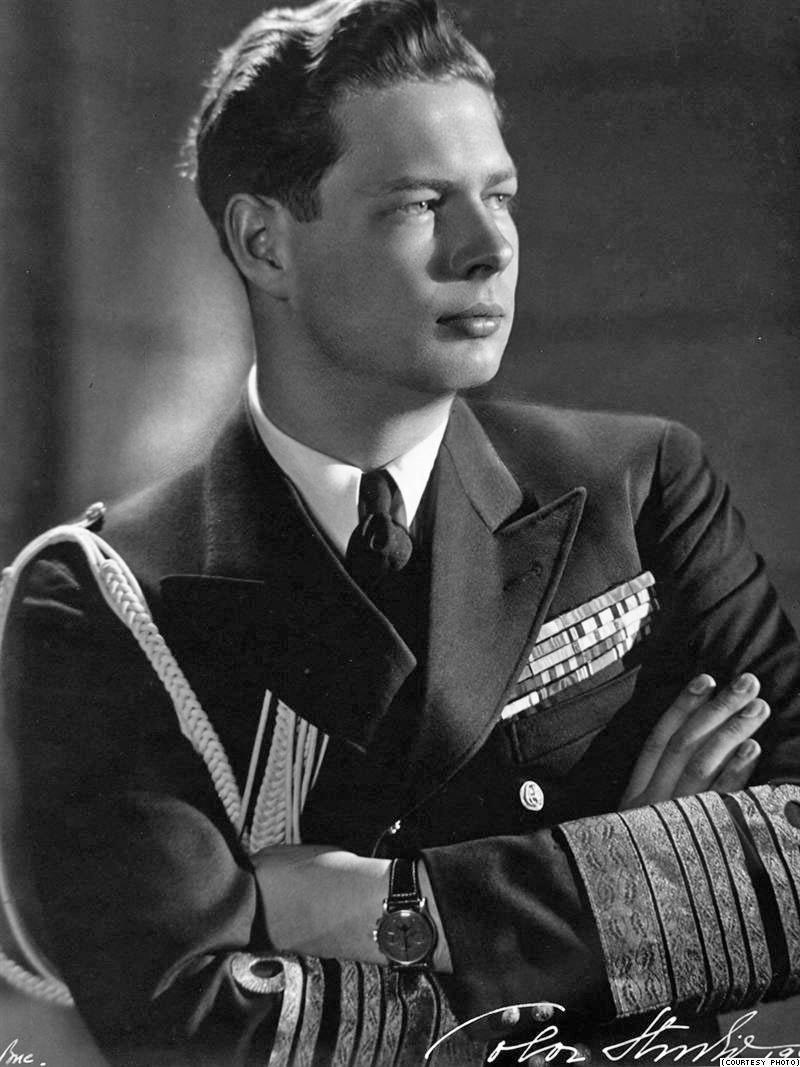
King Michael I (1927–1930; 1940–1947)

=== Kings of Romania (1881–1947) ===
Name	Lifespan	Reign start	Reign end	Notes	Family	Image
Charles I: Carol	20 April 1839 – 10 October 1914 (aged 75)	15 March 1881	10 October 1914	Prince Karl of Hohenzollern-Sigmaringen elected Sovereign Prince of Romania 20 April 1866	Hohenzollern-Sigmaringen	Carol I of Romania
Ferdinand I: Ferdinand	24 August 1865 – 20 July 1927 (aged 61)	10 October 1914	20 July 1927	Nephew of Carol I	Hohenzollern-Sigmaringen	Ferdinand I of Romania
Michael I (1st reign): Mihai	25 October 1921 – 5 December 2017 (aged 96)	20 July 1927	8 June 1930	Grandson of Ferdinand I	Hohenzollern-Sigmaringen	Michael I of Romania
Charles II: Carol II	15 October 1893 – 4 April 1953 (aged 59)	8 June 1930	6 September 1940	Son of Ferdinand I	Hohenzollern-Sigmaringen	Carol II of Romania
Michael I (2nd reign): Mihai	25 October 1921 – 5 December 2017 (aged 96)	6 September 1940	30 December 1947	Son of Carol II; Restored	Hohenzollern-Sigmaringen	Michael I of Romania

=== Queens-consort of Romania ===
Name	Lifespan	Reign start	Reign end	Notes	Family	Image
Elisabeth	29 December 1843 – 2 March 1916 (aged 72)	15 March 1881	10 October 1914	Consort of King Carol I	Wied	Elisabeta of Romania
Marie	29 October 1875 – 18 July 1938 (aged 62)	10 October 1914	20 July 1927	Consort of King Ferdinand	Saxe-Coburg and Gotha	Maria of Romania
Helen	2 May 1896 – 28 November 1982 (aged 86)			Consort of Crown Prince Carol; Queen Mother on Michael I's 2nd accession	Greece and Denmark (Schleswig-Holstein-Sonderburg-Glücksburg)	Elena of Romania

=== Timeline ===
This is a graphical lifespan timeline of Kings

== Royal standards ==
Royal Standard (1881–1922)

Royal Standard (1922–1947)

== See also ==
- Danubian Vilayet (1864–1878), Ottoman administrative division that included Northern Dobruja
- Historical administrative divisions of Romania
- Kingdom of Romania under Fascism
- Monarchism in Romania
