= Hora Unirii =

Poem by Vasile Alecsandri

- by Vasile Alecsandri
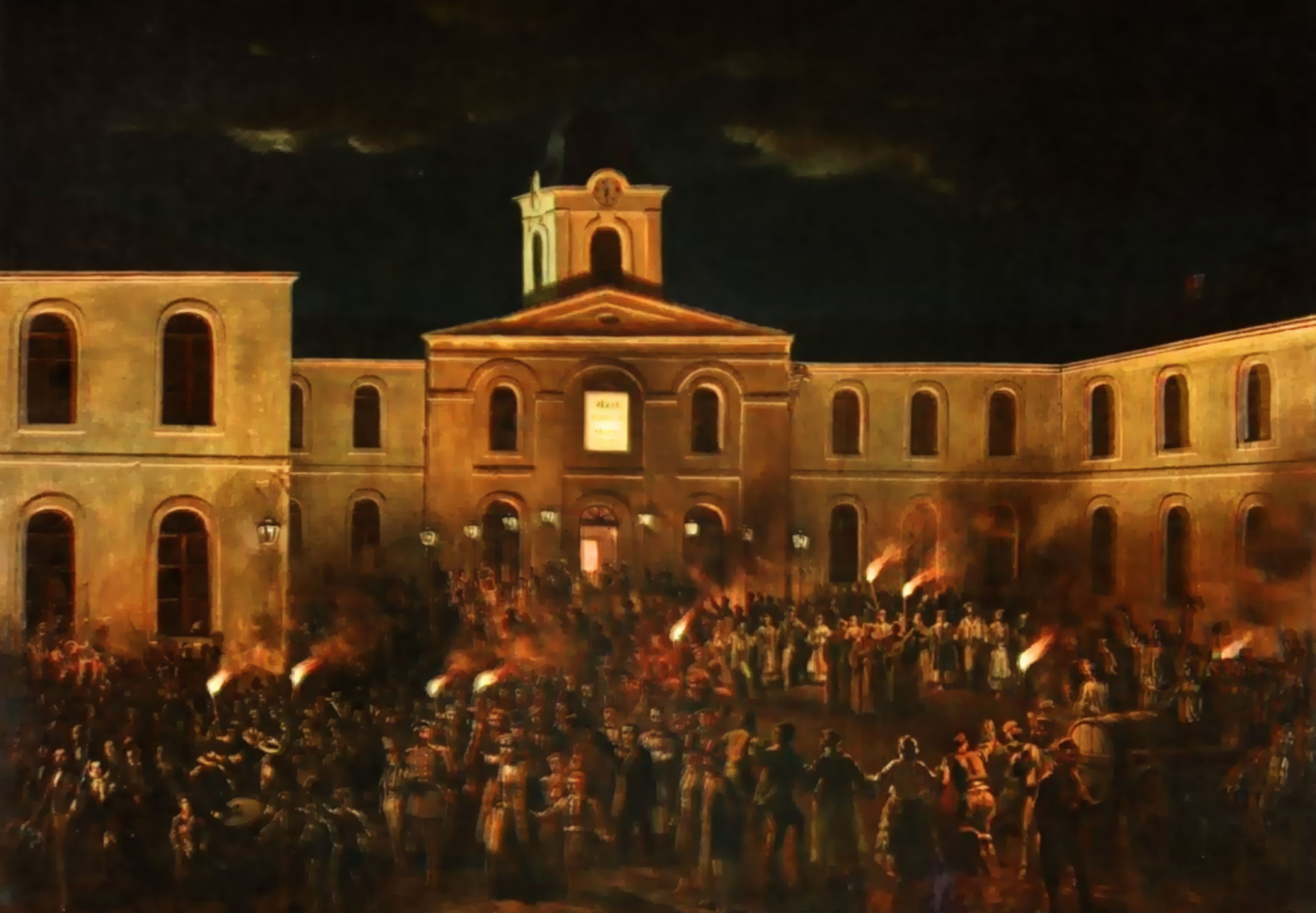
- Hora Unirii at Craiova by Theodor Aman, 1857

"Hora Unirii" ('Hora of the Union') is a poem by Vasile Alecsandri, published in 1856. The music of the song was composed by Alexandru Flechtenmacher. The song is sung and danced especially on 24 January, the anniversary of the day in which the Romanian United Principalities were formally united in 1859. It was, in fact, considered the "unofficial anthem" of the unification of the Romanian principalities and its supporters in 1859.

The poem Kënga e bashkimit ('The Song of Unity') of Aleksandër Stavre Drenova, published in 1912, is a clear adaptation of Alecsandri's "Hora Unirii".

== Usage ==
The song was used by the state broadcaster TVR for its station sign-off during the "energy saving program" between 1985 and 1989, when its schedule was severely limited to two hours per day.

== Lyrics ==
Hai să dăm mână cu mână
Cei cu inimă română,
Sa-nvârtim hora frăției
Pe pământul României!

Iarba rea din holde piară!
Piară dușmănia-n țară!
Între noi să nu mai fie
Decât flori și omenie!

Măi muntene, măi vecine
Vino să te prinzi cu mine
Și la viață cu unire
Și la moarte cu-nfrățire!

Unde-i unul nu-i putere
La nevoi și la durere
Unde-s doi puterea crește
Și dușmanul nu sporește!

Amândoi suntem de-o mamă
De-o făptură și de-o seamă,
Ca doi brazi într-o tulpină
Ca doi ochi într-o lumină.

Amândoi avem un nume,
Amândoi o soarta-n lume.
Eu ți-s frate, tu mi-ești frate,
În noi doi un suflet bate!

Vin' la Milcov cu grăbire
Să-l secăm dintr-o sorbire,
Ca să treacă drumul mare
Peste-a noastre vechi hotare,

Și să vadă sfântul soare
Într-o zi de sărbătoare
Hora noastră cea frățească
Pe câmpia românească!

Translation:

Let's join hands,
Those with Romanian hearts
To go round the dance of brotherhood
On Romania's land!

May the bad seed disappear
May the enmity in the country be gone
Let there only be
Flowers and kindness among us!

Hey Wallachian, hey neighbor
Come join me,
Unity through life
And brotherhood through death!

A single man is weak
During sorrows and pains
Where there are more
The enemy cannot overcome!

We are sons of the same mother
The same origin and kind
Like two joined pines
Like the light of two eyes!

Both of us carry the same name
Both of us one fate in the world
I am your brother and you are mine
We have the same heart beating in our chests!

Come to Milcov, hurry
To dry it in one sip
So that the great road
Shall pass our old borders,

And so that the sacred sun
Shall shine upon a day of celebration
Upon our brotherly dance
On the Romanian Plain!

== See also ==
- Hora (dance)
