= Marș triumfal =

First anthem of Romania

English: Triumphant March
- Former national anthem of Romania
- Music: Eduard Hübsch, 1861
- Adopted: 1862
- Relinquished: 1884
- Succeeded by: Trăiască Regele

"Marș triumfal" (Triumphant March), or "Marș triumfal și primirea steagului și a Măriei Sale Prințul Domnitor" (Triumphant March and Reception of the Flag and His Excellency Prince Ruler) by its long name, was the first anthem of Romania. It is a piece without lyrics composed by Eduard Hübsch. In 1861, a contest was organized to decide the national anthem of the country with a prize of 100 golden coins. Hübsch was the winner, and the march was officially adopted on 22 January 1862.

"Marș triumfal" is now used by the Romanian Army for ceremonies or high-ranking foreign persons, being known as "Marș de întâmpinare al Armatei României" (Welcoming March of the Romanian Army).
