= Kingdom of Romania under Fascism =

Regimes in Europe (1937–1938; 1940–1944)

Kingdom of Romania Regatul României
- 1937–1938; 1940–1944
- Flag Coat of arms
- Motto: Nihil Sine Deo ("Nothing without God")
- Anthem: Trăiască Regele ("Long live the King")
- National seal (1940-1941)

- The Kingdom of Romania in 1942
- Capital and largest city: Bucharest
- Official languages: Romanian
- Common languages: List: Hungarian, German, Yiddish, Ukrainian, Russian, Bulgarian, Romani, Turkish, Gagauz and others
- Religion: Romanian Orthodox (State Religion)
- Demonym: Romanian
- Government: Constitutional monarchy under a fascist government (1937–1938); Fascist military dictatorship (1940–1944)
- Prime Minister
  - 1937–1938: Octavian Goga
  - 1940–1944: Ion Antonescu (Note: Also holding the title of Conducător)
- King
  - 1937–1940: Carol II
  - 1940–1944: Michael I
- Deputy Prime Minister
  - 1940–1941: Horia Sima (Note: Leader of the Iron Guard, on an equal footing with the Conducător)
- Legislature: Assembly of Deputies
  - Upper house: Senate
  - Lower house: Assembly of Deputies
- History
  - Rule began: 28 December 1937
  - Establishment of the National Legionary State: 14 September 1940
  - Disestablishing of the National Legionary State: 14 February 1941
  - 1944 Romanian coup d'état: 23 August 1944

Population
  - 1941: 13.5 million
- GDP (nominal): estimate
  - Total: $2.834 billion
- Currency: Romanian Leu
- ISO 3166 code: RO
Preceded by
National Legionary State
1940: Tsardom of Bulgaria
Kingdom of Hungary
Succeeded by
Kingdom of Romania
1940/1944: Moldavian SSR
Ukrainian SSR
1945: Tsardom of Bulgaria
- Today part of: Romania; Moldova; Ukraine; Bulgaria

The Kingdom of Romania was under fascist rule from 1937 to 1938 and 1940 to 1944. These were the National Christian Party between December 1937 and February 1938; and the dictatorship of Ion Antonescu from 1940 to 1944.

== National Christian Party ==
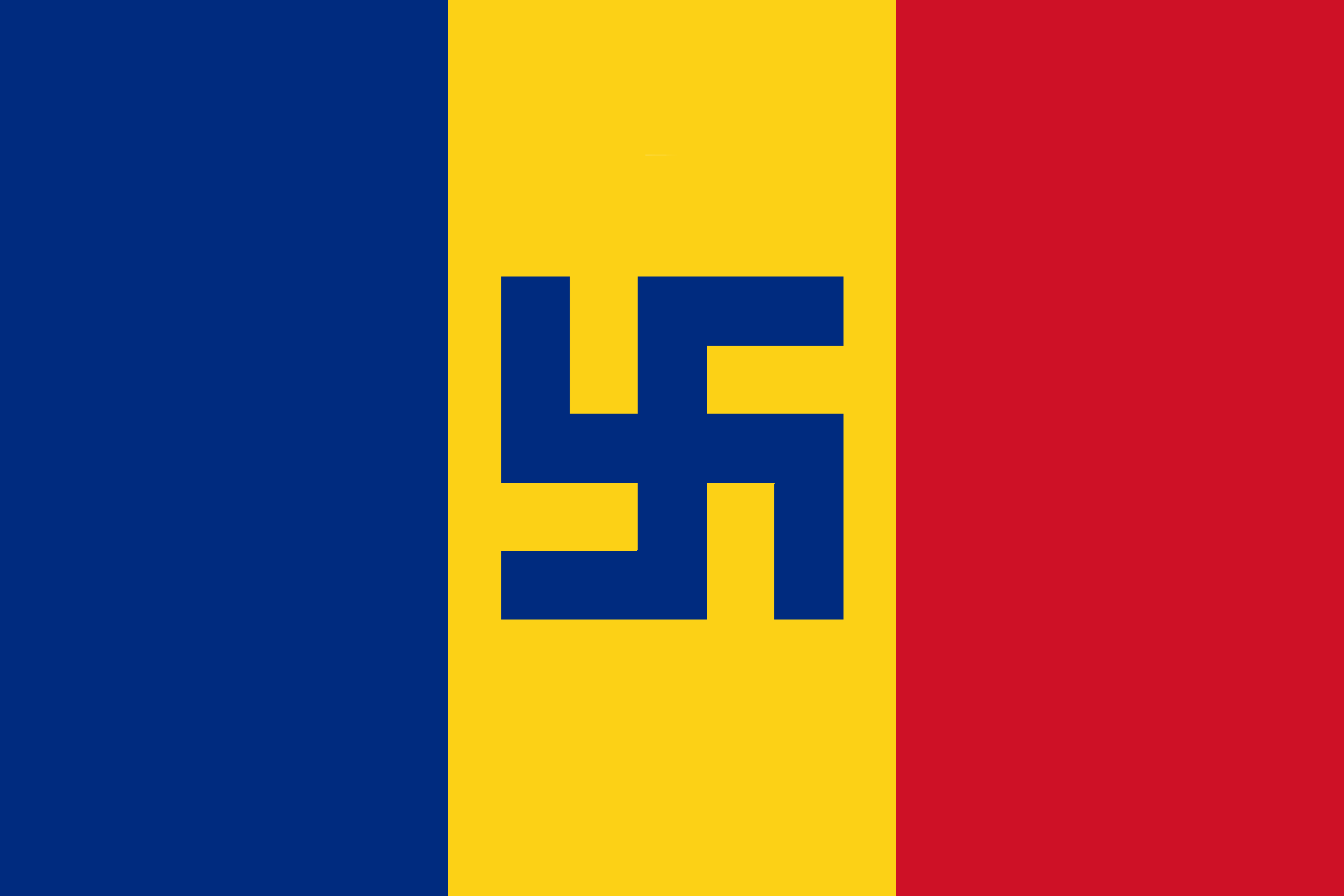
Flag of the PNC

The National Christian Party was created in 1935, from the merger between Octavian Goga's National Agrarian Party and Alexandru C. Cuza's National Christian Defense League. This new party had a strong fascist tinge, particularly in trying to emulate Italian corporatism. Following the 1937 Romanian general election, Goga was appointed prime minister on 28 December 1937. His term ended on 10 February 1938. During his cabinet's brief rule, antisemitic laws were introduced and Romania's foreign policy was shifted towards Germany, Italy, and Japan.

Goga's cabinet was divided between pro-Western and pro-Axis ministers. Such division reflected King Carol II's decision to steer a neutral course between the Great Powers. Thus, the King was still ultimately in control of foreign policy. At that time, Goga was likely the most well-known Romanian in Germany. Noteworthy pro-Germans in Goga's cabinet included Ion Gigurtu (Minister of Trade and Industry) and Eugen Savu (Minister of Finance), while pro-Westerners were represented by Armand Călinescu (Minister of the Interior) and General Ion Antonescu (Minister of National Defense). The Minister of Foreign Affairs was Istrate Micescu, a member of the National Christian Party and thus a pro-German. However, he pledged to follow Carol's commands. He made contradictory statements: on the one hand he pledged to create lasting links between Romania and the Axis (31 December 1937), but later pronounced himself in favor of the League of Nations and Czechoslovakia. Goga himself, stated his wishes for a new commercial treaty with Germany, but also for keeping the traditional links with France as well as strengthening ties with Britain. Ultimately, upon taking office as prime minister, he sent telegrams of friendship to Czechoslovakia, France, Poland, Yugoslavia, Italy, and Germany. Despite being a Germanophile, Goga still made it clear to Hitler, in his New Year telegram, that close ties with Germany would depend on the Reich's recognition of Romanian territorial integrity. Unwilling to alienate Hungary, Hitler simply sent Goga his "gratitude" for the declaration. Despite all these, Goga's cabinet was the first to include a vocal pro-German element for the first time since the First World War, and Hitler described the coming to power of his government as the "first happy event of the New Year".

As Goga was unable to form a parliamentary majority, his party having secured only 9% of the vote, he dissolved the Parliament before it could convene. Since Goga's government issued laws and decrees without the backing of Parliament, his regime was effectively a dictatorship.

On 8 February, Goga came to an understanding with Corneliu Zelea Codreanu, the leader of the Iron Guard. Because the main reason King Carol appointed Goga as prime minister to begin with was to serve as a measure against the Iron Guard, Goga was promptly dismissed within forty-eight hours.

=== Antisemitic legislation ===
Goga's government inaugurated a radical antisemitic internal policy. It introduced legislation aimed at curtailing what was seen by many Romanians as the disproportionate position of the country's Jewish minority in the economy and higher education. As a result, Jews boycotted work and withdrew their money from the banks, thus bringing the economy to a standstill. In the end, Western displeasure at Goga's antisemitic policies contributed to his fall from power on 10 February 1938, when he was dismissed by the King. By choosing the antisemitic National Christian Party to form a government, the King hoped to draw off support from the more popular Iron Guard, which had gained 15.6% of the votes during the December 1937 election (by comparison, the National Christian Party gained less than 10% of the votes). Under Goga, antisemitism became state policy. On 30 December, several "Jewish" newspapers were banned. Other measures included the interdiction of Jews to sell alcohol and tobacco, a ban on hiring foreigners (including Jews) in cafes and restaurants, and the suspension of the right to practice their job of 1,540 registered Jewish lawyers in Bucharest. These measures culminated in a decree promulgated on 21 January 1938, which stripped 225,222 Jews of their Romanian citizenship. Although the Goga government soon fell, this decree was not cancelled, and this large batch of Jews all had their rights as Romanian citizens revoked by 15 September 1939. Despite the fall of Goga, antisemitism had become too strong of a policy for any subsequent government to afford ignoring it. Goga's appointment as prime minister on 28 December 1937 was seen as a formal approval of fascist violence. Romania slipped into chaos within weeks: Jew-beating became a daily occurrence, tens of thousands of Lăncieri (the paramilitary wing of the National Christian Party) carried out street violence and gang warfare against the Iron Guard, shops were closed, and the exchange rate collapsed. Romania appeared to be on the brink of civil war.

=== Legacy ===
Goga's government was the second antisemitic government in interwar Europe, after that of Nazi Germany, stripping one third of Romanian Jews of their citizenship. Because of its antisemitic measures, the Goga-Cuza government has been referred to as "more Nazi than the Germans".

The Romanian King used the failures of the Goga government to proclaim his own royal dictatorship and to blame the country's condition on the system of parliamentary democracy. He actually took full power in order to personally deal with the rising Iron Guard. Before February was out, a new Constitution came into force under which the Parliament had been relegated to an advisory role, with the real power being held by the King and his Crown Council. Goga's successor as prime minister was Patriarch Miron Cristea.

Octavian Goga is today remembered as one of Romania's national poets, his entire political career being almost completely forgotten by the Romanian public. For instance, the "Octavian Goga County Library" in Cluj-Napoca is named after him.

== Ion Antonescu ==
Ion Antonescu (/ˌæntəˈnɛskuː/; Romanian: [iˈon antoˈnesku]; 14 June [O.S. 2 June] 1882 – 1 June 1946) was a Romanian military officer and marshal who presided over two successive wartime dictatorships as Prime Minister and Conducător during most of World War II. Having been responsible for facilitating the Holocaust in Romania, he was overthrown in 1944, before being tried for war crimes and executed two years later in 1946.

A Romanian Army career officer who made his name during the 1907 peasants' revolt and the World War I Romanian campaign, the antisemitic Antonescu sympathised with far-right and fascist politics. He was a military attaché to France and later Chief of the General Staff, briefly serving as Defence Minister in the National Christian cabinet of Octavian Goga as well as the subsequent First Cristea cabinet, in which he also served as Air and Marine Minister. During the late 1930s, his political stance brought him into conflict with King Carol II and led to his detainment. Antonescu rose to political prominence during the political crisis of 1940, and established the National Legionary State, an uneasy partnership with Horia Sima of the Iron Guard. After entering Romania into an alliance with Nazi Germany, he eliminated the Guard following their Legionary Rebellion of 1941. In addition to being Prime Minister, he served as his own Foreign Minister and Defence Minister. Soon after Romania joined the Axis in Operation Barbarossa, recovering Bessarabia, Northern Bukovina and the Hertsa region, which had been occupied one year earlier by the Soviet Union, Antonescu also became Marshal of Romania.

An atypical figure among Holocaust perpetrators, Antonescu enforced policies independently responsible for the deaths of as many as 400,000 people, most of them Bessarabian, Ukrainian and Romanian Jews, as well as Romanian Romani. The regime's complicity in the Holocaust combined pogroms and mass murders such as the Odessa massacre with ethnic cleansing and systematic deportations to occupied Transnistria. The system in place was nevertheless characterized by singular inconsistencies, prioritizing plunder over killing, showing leniency toward most Jews in the Old Kingdom, and ultimately refusing to adopt the Final Solution. This was made possible by the fact that Romania, as an ally of Nazi Germany, was not occupied by the Wehrmacht and preserved a degree of political autonomy.

Aerial attacks on Romania by the Allies in 1944 and heavy casualties on the Eastern Front prompted Antonescu to open peace negotiations with the Allies, which were inconclusive. On 23 August 1944, King Michael I led a coup d'état against Antonescu, who was arrested; after the war he was convicted of war crimes, being executed in June 1946. His involvement in the Holocaust was officially reasserted and condemned following the 2003 Wiesel Commission report.

== See also ==
- National Legionary State
- National Christian Party
- Iron Guard
- National Renaissance Front
