= National Legionary State =

WWII-era fascist regime in Romania (1940–41)

Kingdom of Romania Regatul României
- 1940–1941
- Flag Coat of arms
- Royal anthem: Trăiască Regele ("Long live the King")
- National seal

- Capital: Bucharest
- Common languages: Romanian
- Demonym: Romanian
- Government: Parliamentary constitutional monarchy under a totalitarian regime
- King
  - 1940–1941: Michael I
- Prime Minister & Conducător
  - 1940–1941: Ion Antonescu
- Deputy Prime Minister
  - 1940–1941: Horia Sima (Note: Leader of the Iron Guard, on an equal footing with the Conducător)
- History
  - Established: 14 September 1940
  - Disestablished: 14 February 1941

Area
  - Total: 195,000 km^{2} (75,000 sq mi)

Population
  - 1940: 20,058,378
Preceded by	Succeeded by
Kingdom of Romania under Fascism	Kingdom of Romania under Fascism
- Today part of: Romania

The National Legionary State (Romanian: Statul Național Legionar) was a totalitarian regime which governed Romania for five months, from 14 September 1940 until its official dissolution on 14 February 1941. The regime was led by General Ion Antonescu in partnership with the Iron Guard, the Romanian fascist, ultra-nationalist, anti-communist and antisemitic organization. Though the Iron Guard had been in the Romanian Government since 28 June 1940, on 14 September it achieved dominance, leading to the proclamation of the National Legionary State.

On 27 September 1940, Romania withdrew from the Balkan Pact. On 8 October, Nazi German troops began crossing into Romania, and soon numbered over 500,000. On 23 November, Romania formally joined the Axis powers. On 27 November, 64 former dignitaries or officials were executed by the Iron Guard in the Jilava Massacre. The already harsh antisemitic legislation was expanded, included the expropriation of Jewish-owned rural property on 4 October, followed by forests on 17 November, and finally by river transport on 4 December.

On 20 January 1941, the Iron Guard attempted a coup, combined with a pogrom against the Jews of Bucharest. Within four days, Antonescu had successfully suppressed the coup, and the Iron Guard was forced out of the government. Horia Sima and many other Legionnaires took refuge in Nazi Germany, while others were imprisoned. Antonescu formally abolished the National Legionary State on 14 February 1941.

== Precursors ==
The Iron Guard first formed an alliance with the Romanian Government in early 1938, when the then-Prime Minister Octavian Goga concluded an agreement with the leader of the Iron Guard, Corneliu Zelea Codreanu on 8 February 1938 for limited cooperation. However, this political arrangement displeased the King Carol II, who dismissed Goga on 11 February and replaced him with Patriarch Miron Cristea.

Between 28 June and 4 July 1940 Horia Sima, the nominal leader of the Iron Guard after the death of Codreanu, served as Undersecretary of State at the Ministry of Education. The Iron Guard was brought into the Ion Gigurtu's cabinet, which took power on 4 July 1940, after the Soviet occupation of Bessarabia and Northern Bukovina. Three Guardists were appointed to the new government: Vasile Noveanu as Minister of Public Wealth, Sima as Minister of Religion and Arts, and Augustin Bideanu as Undersecretary of State at the Ministry of Finance. However, Sima resigned on 7 July, because he was denied a purely Guardist cabinet, while his two colleagues retained their posts. An Iron Guard supporter and ideologue, Nichifor Crainic, became Minister of Propaganda. Following Sima's resignation on 7 July, he was replaced by another Guardist, Radu Budișteanu.

== Territory and population ==
The territory of the National Legionary State amounted to roughly 195,000 square km (or just over 75,000 square miles). It had the same territory as modern day Romania, with the exception of Northern Transylvania, which had been ceded to Hungary in the aftermath of the Second Vienna Award. It also possessed several islands in the Danube Delta, as well as Snake Island in the Black Sea. These have been part of Ukraine since 1948.

A Romanian census was conducted on 6 April 1941 and recorded a population of 13,535,757. Though the census was conducted almost two months after the dissolution of the National Legionary State, Romania's borders were the same.

== History ==
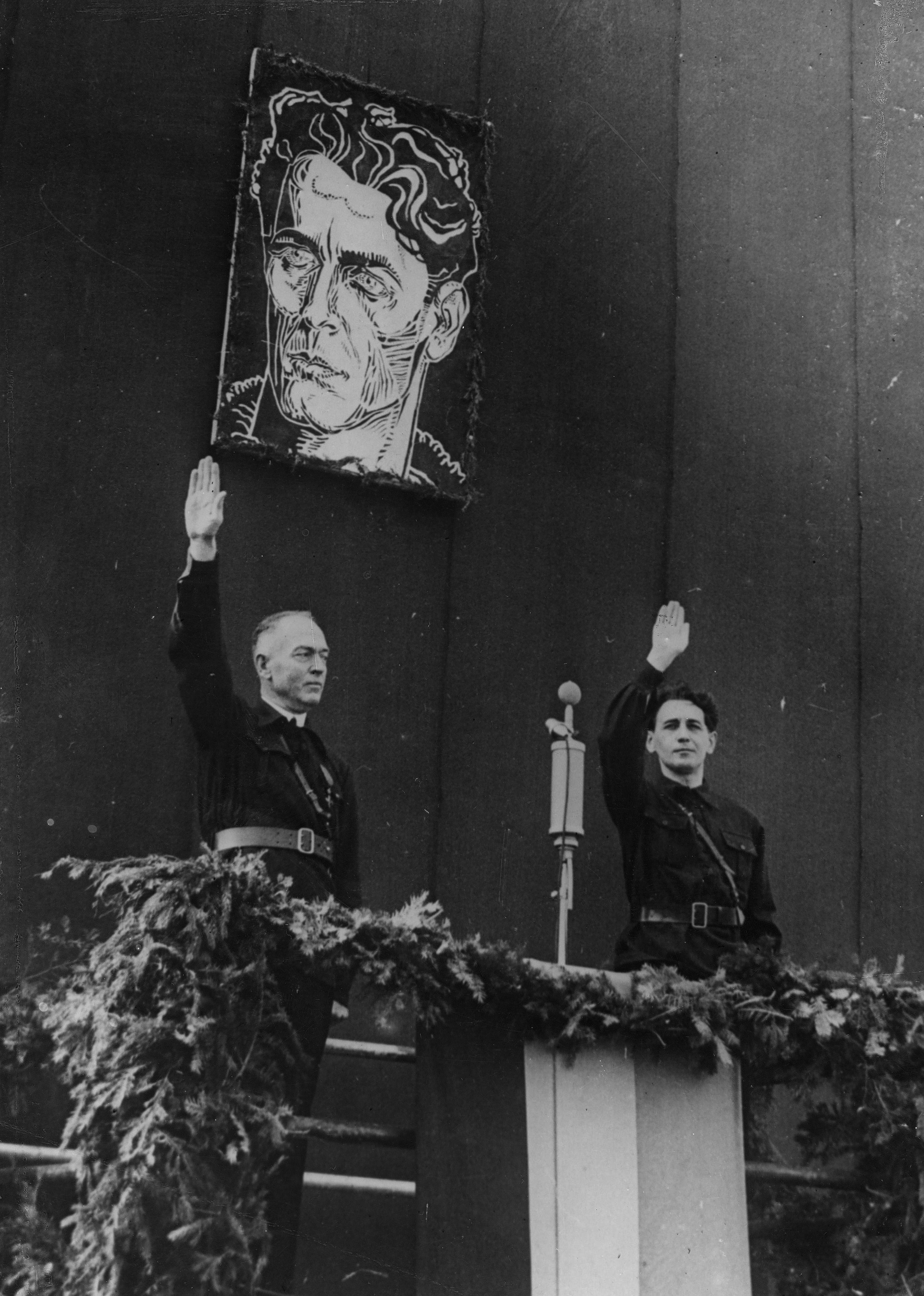
Ion Antonescu and Horia Sima, the leaders of the National Legionary State

King Carol II was forced to abdicate on 6 September 1940, and was replaced by his 19-year-old son, King Michael I. The first act of the new king was to grant General Ion Antonescu unlimited power as Conducător (leader) of Romania, relegating himself to a ceremonial role. A decree of 8 September further defined Antonescu's powers. To maintain his grip at the helm of the country, while at the same time conceding the leading role to the Iron Guard, Antonescu had King Michael proclaim Romania a National Legionary State on 14 September. The Legionary Movement/Iron Guard became the "only movement recognized in the new state", making Romania a totalitarian country.

Antonescu became the legion's honorary leader, with Sima becoming Deputy Prime Minister. Five other Guardists became ministers, among them Prince Mihai Sturza (Minister of Foreign Affairs) and General Constantin Petrovicescu (Minister of Interior). Legionary Prefects were appointed in all of the fifty Romanian counties. The Guard was awarded four portfolios: Interior, Education, Foreign Affairs, and Cults. In addition, most of the permanent secretaries and directors in the ministries were also Guardists. As the dominant political force, the Guard also controlled the press and propaganda services.

On 6 October 1940, Antonescu attended an Iron Guard rally dressed in Legionary uniform. On 8 October, German troops began crossing into Romania, and soon numbered over 500,000. On 23 November Romania joined the Axis powers. On 27 November, 64 former dignitaries or officials were executed by the Iron Guard in Jilava Prison while awaiting trial (see Jilava Massacre). Later that day, historian and former prime minister Nicolae Iorga and economist Virgil Madgearu, a former government minister, were assassinated. On 1 December, another Iron Guard rally took place at Alba Iulia to celebrate 22 years since the Union of Transylvania with Romania. Antonescu again attended, and gave a speech.

After the National Legionary State was proclaimed in 14 September, the Legion became the ruling party but had to share executive power with the Army. The new Legionary regime had a ritual basis based on the cult of the Guard's dead leader (Codreanu) and other Legionary martyrs. Exhumation, public burial and rehabilitation of Legionary "martyrs" was retrospectively regarded by Sima as the most important task justifying the Legion's accession to power. The exhumation of Codreanu's remains and subsequent reburial (21-23 November) reaffirmed Condreanu's charisma as the foundation of Legionary ideology. On the day of Codreanu's reburial, the main Legionary newspaper, Cuvântul (The Word), wrote: "It is the day of the Captain's resurrection. He is resurrected, as he promised, according to the Gospel. He is resurrected, rising from the grave to present to us Romania itself, buried by this sinful age.". A young Emil Cioran in his twenties strongly endorsed Codreanu's cult: "With the exception of Jesus, no other dead being has been so present among the living. Has anybody even thought about forgetting him? This dead man spread a perfume of eternity over our human dung and brought back the sky over Romania." Soon after Codreanu's reburial, however, the Legion committed the Massacre, killing over 60 former dignitaries. The Legion thus achieved its goals: the old order collapsed under its blows and all of the Legion's enemies were punished. The reburial of Codreanu's body took place on 30 November, in attendance was Antonescu, Sima, von Schirach, Bohle and 100,000 Iron Guardists.

The decree which established the National Legionary regime on 14 September placed Antonescu and Sima on an equal footing. On 28 October, Sima accused Antonescu of violating the decree by allowing democratic parties to function. He asserted that such political diversity was contrary to the principles of a totalitarian state. Sima also wanted to apply Nazi principles to Romania's economy in order to bring all of it under centralized control. He addressed a letter to Antonescu in this sense on 16 October, but the latter rejected the idea. Relations between Antonescu and the Guard reached breaking point after the Jilava Massacre. Despite the mounting tension, the two parties achieved a truce for the moment, which allowed a Legionary to keep the post of Bucharest Police Chief but provided for the public condemnation of the Jilava murders.

Several antisemitic decrees were enacted by the National Legionary State. Jewish-owned rural property was expropriated on 4 October, followed by forests on 17 November, and finally by river transport on 4 December.

On 10 November 1940, the National Legionary State faced a massive earthquake (the strongest one recorded in the 20th century in Romania), which destroyed 65,000 homes.

=== Outside developments ===
In early October 1940, 15,000 German troops were deployed to Romania to protect the oil refineries at Ploiești, which were essential for the German war effort. This unilateral German action, carried out without consulting Benito Mussolini, prompted the latter to launch an invasion of Greece. The ensuing Greco-Italian War resulted in a military blunder, as the Greeks counter-attacked and occupied parts of Italian-ruled Albania for half a year. The entrance of German troops in Romania was not an invasion, however, as it occurred with Antonescu's approval. The first German troops arrived in Romania on 10 October, partly as a response to Antonescu's request for military assistance, in addition to their main goal of defending the Romanian oil fields. Romania subsequently joined the Tripartite Pact and the Anti-Comintern Pact on 23 November and 25 November, respectively. Despite this tightening of relations with Germany, the German minority in Romania (numbering 300,000 after Romania's territorial losses) was not entirely spared the process of Romanianization. While few Germans from Banat and Transylvania were repatriated to the Reich, the number of ethnic Germans from Southern Bukovina and Dobruja who were repatriated amounted to 76,500. The German-Romanian convention which sanctioned these repatriations was signed on 22 October 1940. According to the convention, the Romanian state received the real estate previously possessed by the repatriated Germans in exchange for paying compensation to the Reich. The newly acquired property (lands and houses) would be used by the Romanian state to accommodate ethnic Romanian refugees from Bulgaria, displaced in the aftermath of the Treaty of Craiova. On 4 December, a ten-year trade agreement was signed between Romania and Germany, providing for the "economic reconstruction" of Romania.

On 27 September 1940, Romania withdrew from the Balkan Pact. That same day, a trade agreement was signed with one of the Pact members, Turkey. On 19 December, another trade agreement was signed between Romania and Yugoslavia, another member of the Balkan Pact. During the last days of the National Legionary State, on 10 and 12 February, Britain and Belgium severed relations with Romania.

Border skirmishes with the Soviet Union spanned across the duration of the National Legionary State. In the autumn of 1940, the Soviets occupied several Romanian islands in the Danube Delta. Frontier incidents occurred on a daily basis. Soviet troops were concentrated on the Romanian border, Soviet aircraft made incessant incursions in Romania's air space, and — in January 1941 — Soviet vessels attempted to enter Romanian waters by force. Tensions peaked in January 1941, when the Soviets demanded by ultimatum the control of the Danube Delta. Border clashes ensued near Galați (Covurlui County), where the Romanians were mining the Danube, during which between 26 and 100 were killed on both sides.

=== Demise ===
On 20 January 1941, the Iron Guard attempted a coup, combined with a pogrom against the Jews of Bucharest. On 22 January, at the height of the Rebellion, the Iron Guard carried out the ritual murder of 200 Jews at the Bucharest slaughterhouse, while the Guardists were singing Christian hymns, "an act of ferocity perhaps unique in the history of the Holocaust". Within four days, Antonescu had successfully suppressed the coup. The Iron Guard was forced out of the government. Sima and many other legionnaires took refuge in Germany, while others were imprisoned. Antonescu abolished the National Legionary State, in its stead declaring Romania a "National and Social State."

The suppression of the Rebellion also provided some data on the military equipment used by the Iron Guard, amounting to 5,000 firearms (revolvers, rifles and machine guns) and numerous grenades in Bucharest alone. The Legion also possessed a small armored force of two armored police cars and two Malaxa UE armored tracked carriers. For transport, in Bucharest alone, the Legion also possessed almost 200 trucks.

On 14 February 1941, the National Legionary State was formally abolished. Over 9,000 people implicated in the Legionary Rebellion were subsequently arrested, of which almost 2,000 (1,842, to be exact) were sentenced to various terms, ranging from a few months to life in prison.

== Military production ==
=== Small arms ===
Between 1938 and June 1941, Romania produced over 5,000 ZB vz. 30 light machine guns. This accounts for an average monthly production of over 120 machine guns, meaning that around 500 were produced by the National Legionary State during its 4 months of existence.

=== Artillery pieces ===
Between 1938 and May 1941, Romania produced 102 Rheinmetall 37 mm anti-aircraft guns. This accounts for an average monthly production of 2.5 pieces, meaning that around 10 were produced by the National Legionary State during its 4 months of existence.

Between 1936 and July 1941, Romania produced 100 Vickers 75 mm anti-aircraft guns. This accounts for an average monthly production of 1.5 pieces, meaning that around 6 were produced by the National Legionary State during its 4 months of existence.

=== Armored vehicles ===
Between the latter half of 1939 and March 1941, Romania produced 126 Malaxa armored tractors. This accounts for an average monthly production of just over 6 tractors, meaning that around 25 were produced by the National Legionary State during its 4 months of existence.

=== Aircraft ===
During the National Legionary State, between October and December 1940, 20 IAR 39 light bombers were delivered. Between April 1939 and March 1943, Romania produced 210 Fleet 10G trainers. This accounts for an average monthly production of 4.5 aircraft, meaning that around 17 were produced by the National Legionary State during its 4 months of existence.

== Legacy ==
According to British historian Dennis Deletant: "Thus ended a unique chapter in the history of Fascism in Europe. The Guard had been the only radical movement of the Right in Europe to come to power without the assistance of Germany or Italy, and the only one to be toppled during Nazi Germany's domination of continental Europe."

The National Legionary State ushered in Romania's Axis membership, first de facto by welcoming the German Army into the country, and soon afterwards, de jure through the signing of the Tripartite and Anti-Comintern Pacts. It also did away with most of Romania's traditional political class during the Jilava massacre before being suppressed itself in January 1941, then formally abolished in February. Footage of several historically valuable speeches survives from the National Legionary State era, such as a joint speech by Antonescu and Sima and the funeral of the Guard's founder, Corneliu Zelea Codreanu.

== See also ==
- Romania in World War II
- Kingdom of Romania under Fascism
