= Valea Laptelui River =

Valea Laptelui River may refer to:

- Valea Laptelui, a tributary of the Crișul Alb in Hunedoara County, Romania
- Valea Laptelui, a tributary of the river Sebeș in Brașov County, Romania
