= Mândra (Olt) =

- Location within Romania

Location
- Country: Romania
- Counties: Brașov County
- Villages: Mărgineni, Toderița, Mândra

Physical characteristics
- Mouth: Olt
  - coordinates: 45.8384°N 25.0360°E
- Length: 23 km (14 mi)
- Basin size: 29 km^{2} (11 sq mi)

Basin features
- Progression: Olt→ Danube→ Black Sea

The Mândra (also: Iaz) is a left tributary of the river Olt in Romania. It flows into the Olt near the village Mândra. Its length is 23 km (14 mi) and its basin size is 29 km^{2} (11 sq mi).
