= Radu Budișteanu =

Romanian lawyer and activist

Minister of Culture and Religious Affairs
- In office 8 July 1940 – 14 September 1940
- Prime Minister: Ion Gigurtu; Ion Antonescu
- Preceded by: Horia Sima
- Succeeded by: Traian Brăileanu

Personal details
- Born: October 11, 1902 Târgu Jiu, Kingdom of Romania
- Died: 1991 (aged 88–89) Frankfurt, West Germany
- Party: Iron Guard
- Spouse: Oriele-Maria Vignali
- Children: Despina Skeletti‑Budișteanu
- Occupation: Lawyer

Constantin-Radu Budișteanu (10 October 1902 – 27 December 1991) was a Romanian lawyer and activist of the Iron Guard.

Born in Târgu Jiu, he studied at the Saint Sava High School in Bucharest, where he started the "Ion Eliad Rădulescu" literary society. He later studied literature, philosophy, and theology as well as law in The Hague and Paris. In 1927, he published his doctoral thesis in Paris, with a preface written by Gheorghe Tătărescu; the thesis was published in Romanian in Bucharest a year later.). From a Romanian Orthodox family, he married Oriele-Maria Vignali, a Catholic from Iași, in 1928 in Paris; the couple later divorced. The two had a daughter, Despina, born in 1930.

Budișteanu became a prominent lawyer who entered the Guard in 1937 and served in the Senate. After King Carol II established a royal dictatorship in February 1938, Budișteanu was arrested; in July 1938, he was sentenced to seven years' imprisonment, held at Miercurea Ciuc, and escaped the massacre of Guardists carried out in the wake of Armand Călinescu's September 1939 assassination. On July 8, 1940, he became Minister of Culture and Religious Affairs in the cabinet of Ion Gigurtu, replacing Horia Sima, who had resigned. Together with his colleagues, Vasile Noveanu and Augustin Bideanu, he constituted the "Carlist group" of Guardists. Two weeks later, he annulled the state subsidy, which had been paid to the religious community of Romanian Jews for many years, and prohibited the baptism of Jews. He banned the purchase of Christian religious objects from Jewish-owned businesses, dismissed Jewish personnel from state and private theaters, and withdrew state recognition from Jewish schools.

On September 9, by which time Ion Antonescu had assumed power, he signed two decrees. The first authorized eight religious bodies to function on Romanian soil: Romanian Orthodoxy, Greek-Catholicism, Roman Catholicism (including the Ukrainian and Armenian Vicariates), Reformed, Lutheran, Unitarian, Armenian Apostolic, and Islam. Judaism was not mentioned, in contrast with the 1928 law he abrogated. The second decree called into question the legal status of Judaism, providing that all extant synagogues had to cease functioning unless expressly authorized to do so by the ministry. Reacting to what was in effect the closure of synagogues and cemeteries, Chief Rabbi Alexandru Șafran persuaded Antonescu to cancel the measure. Budișteanu was in government until the National Legionary State was established on September 14. He served as an attorney for Guard members arrested during the January 1941 Legionnaires' rebellion, but by December 1943 had shown a willingness to cooperate with Antonescu.

In 1945, the new Romanian Communist Party-dominated government began to pursue Budișteanu, who was accused of complicity in provoking national disaster. He managed to hide until 1948, when he was arrested shortly after a communist regime was installed. He revealed the names of all those who helped him evade arrest; they in turn were sent to prison. Without being tried, he was incarcerated at Ocnele Mari (1948–1952) and Sighet Prison (1952–1956). Tried in 1956, he was sentenced to 14 years of hard labor, and sent to Aiud Prison, where he agreed to undergo re-education from 1962 to 1964, and also contributed articles to the propaganda organ Glasul Patriei, reproaching himself for past errors. He was released in 1964, emigrating to West Germany in the late 1970s. There, he re-established ties with Sima and considered himself a Guard leader, contributing to exile magazines. He died in Frankfurt.
