= Michel Sturdza =

Prince Mihail R. Sturdza
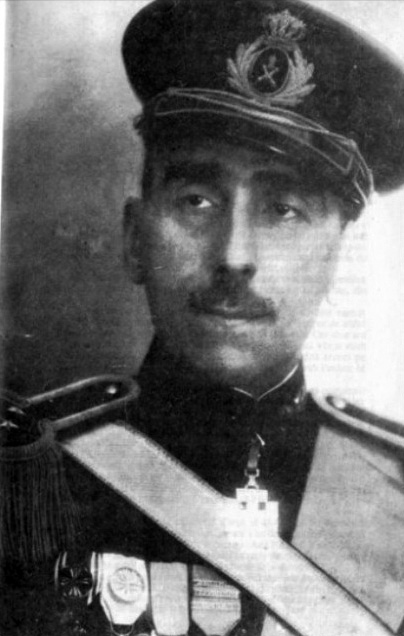

Minister of Foreign Affairs of Romania
- In office September 14, 1940 – January 17, 1941
- Monarch: Michael of Romania
- Preceded by: Mihail Manoilescu
- Succeeded by: Ad interim Ion Antonescu

Personal details
- Born: August 28, 1886 Târgu Ocna, Kingdom of Romania
- Died: February 5, 1980 (aged 93) Madrid, Spain
- Party: Iron Guard

Prince Mihail R. Sturdza (August 28, 1886 – February 5, 1980) was a Romanian nobleman, diplomat and convicted war criminal (in absentia). He was a descendant of the wealthy and influential Sturdza family of Romanian landowners, politicians and boyars, and played a brief role in Romanian interwar politics.

== Biography ==
Prince Mihail Sturdza, originally a conservative and nationalist, was a member of the Iron Guard. As a supporter of the leader of the Iron Guard Horia Sima, he was a brief period (September 14, 1940 - January 26, 1941) Minister of Foreign Affairs of Romania during the so-called National Legionary State after the abdication of King Carol II.

After several diplomatic posts (e.g. in Vienna, Budapest and in Washington as chargé d'affaires) Sturdza was in 1929 appointed as minister plenipotentiary for Latvia, Estonia and Finland, in Riga. In that capacity he acted in 1932 as Romania's representative in the negotiations with Soviet Russia about a non-aggression agreement. The negotiations failed, due to the Soviet demand to discuss and annex the disputed territory of Bessarabia, which was a part of the Kingdom of Romania. He was awarded the Latvian Order of the Three Stars 1st Class on 12 September 1935.

From 1938, Sturdza served as Romanian ambassador to Denmark.

As Foreign Minister Sturdza attended with the German minister of Foreign Affairs Joachim von Ribbentrop the signature on November 23, 1940 of the Tripartite Pact with Nazi Germany between Adolf Hitler and the Romanian head of government General Ion Antonescu. In December 1940 Sturdza obtained the replacement of the German ambassador Wilhelm Fabricius with Manfred Freiherr von Killinger, perceived as more sympathetic to the Iron Guard. After the clash between the Iron Guard and General Ion Antonescu in January 1941 (see Legionary Rebellion), which was won by the latter, Sturdza had to resign. Antonescu took over leadership of the ministry, with the compliant diplomat Constantin Greceanu as his right hand.

After the defeat of the Iron Guard in January 1941, Sturdza followed party leader Horia Sima into exile; first in Sofia, Bulgaria and afterward in Germany and Denmark. Sturdza became again Minister of Foreign Affairs in a self-proclaimed government in Vienna from 10 December 1944 until the end of World War II.

After World War II, Sturdza fled first to Denmark, where he stayed until 1947. Afterwards, he found refuge in Costa Rica, Spain and later in the USA, where he kept strong ties with other members of the Iron Guard in exile. He wrote several publications about the history of his native country and international affairs. In later years he was involved in right-wing organisations. In 1968, he published his memoirs, entitled The Suicide of Europe, which were praised in right-wing circles for Sturdza's strong anti-communist point of view.
