= Mândra =

- Commune
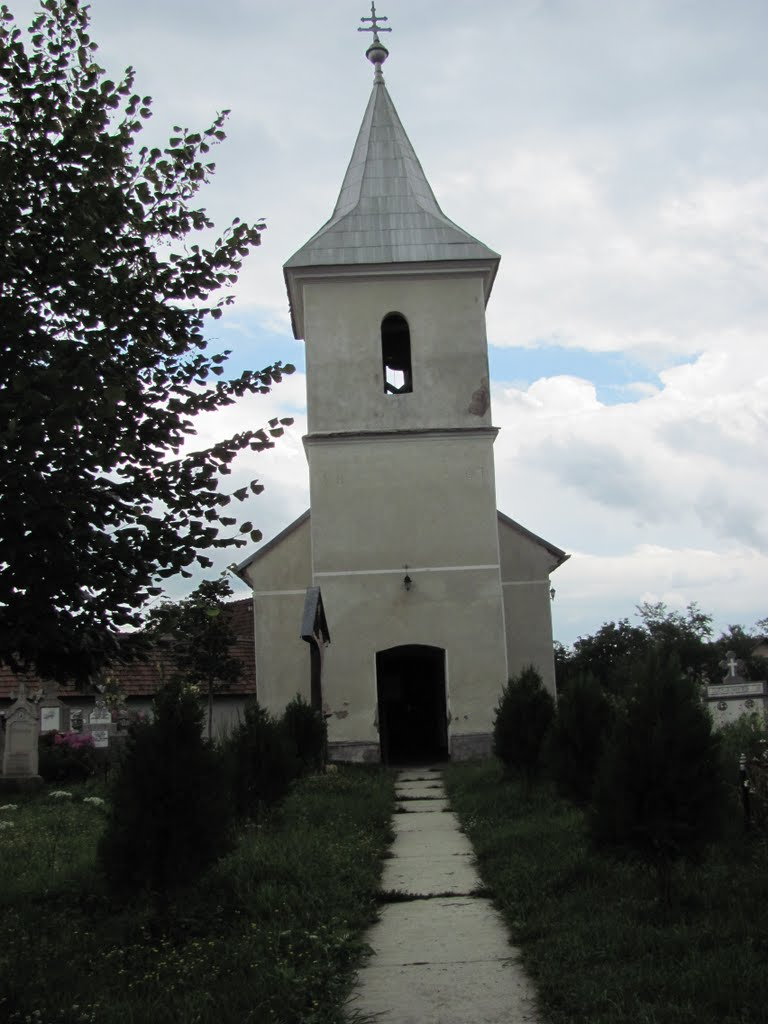
- Church in Râușor

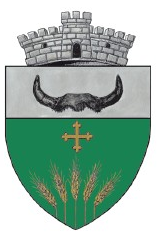
- Coat of arms

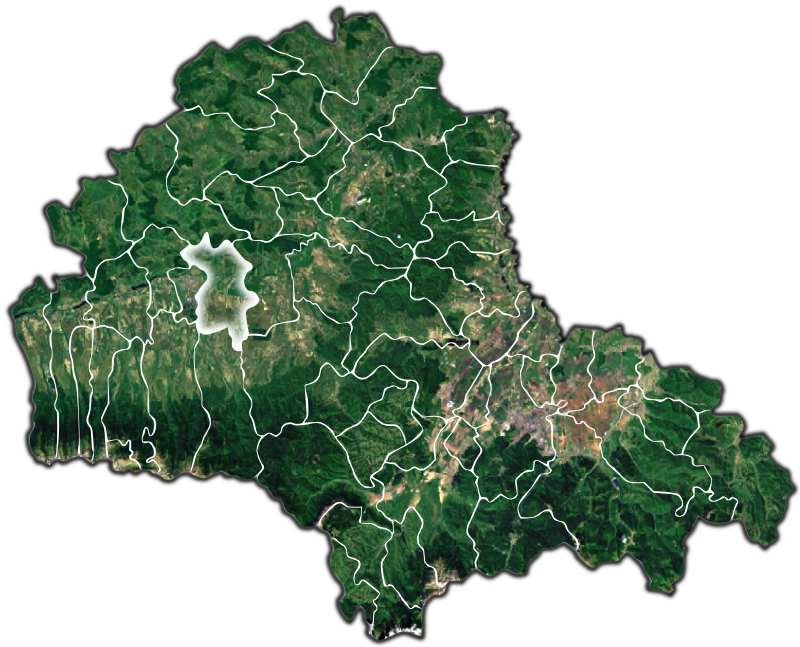
- Location within the county

- Location in Romania
- Coordinates: 45.8220°N 25.0461°E
- Country: Romania
- County: Brașov

Government
  - Mayor (2020–2024): Ioan-Șerban Taflan (PSD)
- Area: 87.97 km^{2} (33.97 sq mi)
- Elevation: 423 m (1,388 ft)
- Population (2021-12-01): 2,788
  - Density: 31.69/km^{2} (82.08/sq mi)
- Time zone: UTC+02:00 (EET)
  - Summer (DST): UTC+03:00 (EEST)
- Postal code: 507125
- Area code: (+40) 02 68
- Vehicle reg.: BV
- Website: www.comunamandra.ro

Mândra (German: Kladendorf; Hungarian: Mundra) is a commune in Brașov County, Transylvania, Romania. It is composed of five villages: Ileni (Illény), Mândra, Râușor (Reusor), Șona (Schönen; Sona), and Toderița (Todorica).

The commune is located in the west-central part of the county, close to the geographical center of Romania. It is on the DN1 road, 6 km (3.7 mi) east of Făgăraș and 60 km (37 mi) west of Brașov. It is traversed south to north by the Mândra and Sebeș rivers, which flow into the Olt a short distance away.

Historical population
Year	Pop.	±%
1850	4,197	—
1956	4,909	+17.0%
1977	4,200	−14.4%
2002	2,933	−30.2%
2011	2,762	−5.8%
2021	2,788	+0.9%
Source: Census data

== Natives ==
- Horia Sima (1906 – 1993), Iron Guard leader
- Mariana Tîrcă (born 1962), handball player
