= Sebeș (Brașov) =

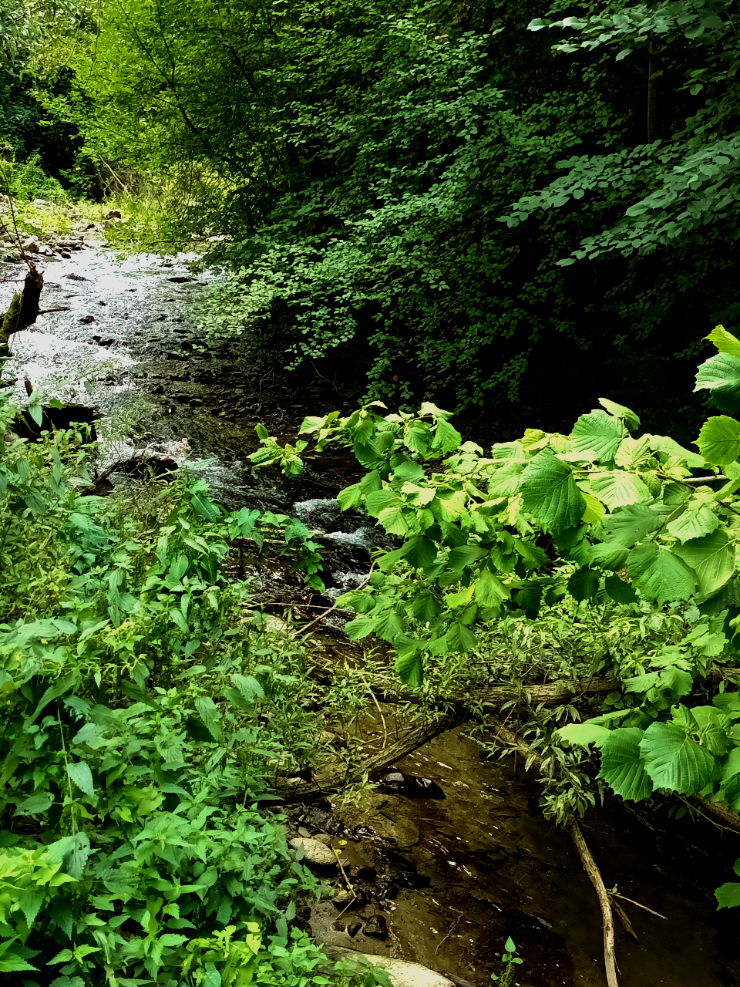
- The Sebeș in Hârseni

- Location within Romania

Location
- Country: Romania
- Counties: Brașov County
- Villages: Hârseni, Ileni, Râușor

Physical characteristics
- Source: Făgăraș Mountains, Mount Berivoiul Mare
- Mouth: Olt
  - coordinates: 45.8385°N 25.0210°E
- Length: 38 km (24 mi)
- Basin size: 94 km^{2} (36 sq mi)

Basin features
- Progression: Olt→ Danube→ Black Sea

The Sebeș (Hungarian: Sebes-patak) is a left tributary of the river Olt in Romania. It discharges into the Olt east of Făgăraș. The source of the Sebeș is in the Făgăraș Mountains. Its length is 38 km (24 mi) and its basin size is 94 km^{2} (36 sq mi).

== Tributaries ==
The following rivers are tributaries to the river Sebeș:

- Left: Țiganu, Cuciulata
- Right: Buzduganu, Valea Laptelui, Groapele, Valea Neamțului, Pârâul Hotarului, Pârâul lui Simion, Coșarnița, Fântânele, Corbu
