= Vasile Noveanu =

Romanian activist (1904–1992)

Vasile Noveanu (1904–1992) was a Romanian activist of the Iron Guard.

A childhood friend of Guard founder Corneliu Zelea Codreanu and participant in 1922 antisemitic student riots, he later served as leader of the Arad organization. As a means of rescuing the Guard, he became keen on reconciling the suppressed movement with the dictatorial King Carol II after the latter ordered Codreanu's assassination in late 1938. By early 1940, he had emerged as domestic leader of the Guard (another faction, under Horia Sima, had fled to Berlin). At the time, the king had decided to reconcile with the Guard, and ordered his ministers Mihail Ghelmegeanu and Ernest Urdăreanu to arrange a meeting between Noveanu and a group of released Guardist prisoners. The most prominent of the movement's domestic members, Noveanu included, accepted the king's offer and signed a letter, published in the press, that pledged allegiance to him.

On April 26, 1940, King Carol issued an amnesty for the Guard, and on July 4, the cabinet of Ion Gigurtu was sworn in with three Guardist members, including Noveanu as Minister of Public Wealth Inventory. Together with his colleagues, Radu Budișteanu and Augustin Bideanu, he constituted the "Carlist group" of Guardists. He remained in office until September 4, when the cabinet fell. Two days later, Sima removed him from the Guard leadership. From March to September 1945, after the installation of a Romanian Communist Party-dominated government, he was placed under arrest. After being freed, he became an informer to the Siguranța secret police. Together with Alexandru Constant, Petre P. Panaitescu, and Liviu Stan, he was one of several ex-Guardists who dealt with the authorities in order to lessen political tensions with their group. Under the communist regime, he was kept under permanent surveillance by the Securitate and arrested in 1964. Sentenced to four and a half years in prison, he was freed in January 1969. According to some sources, he was also incarcerated before 1964, and was reportedly present at Aiud Prison, at lead mines and in forced residence on the Bărăgan Plain.
