= Hârseni =

- Commune
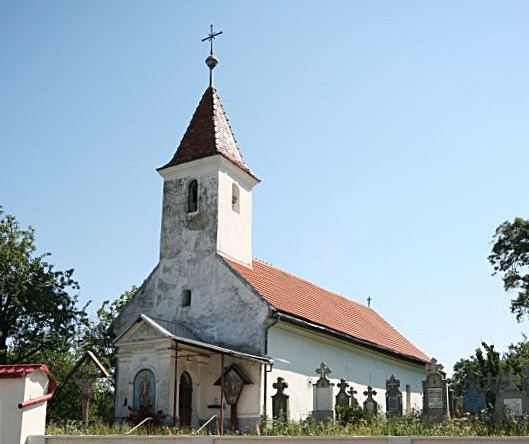
- St. Nicholas Church in Mărgineni

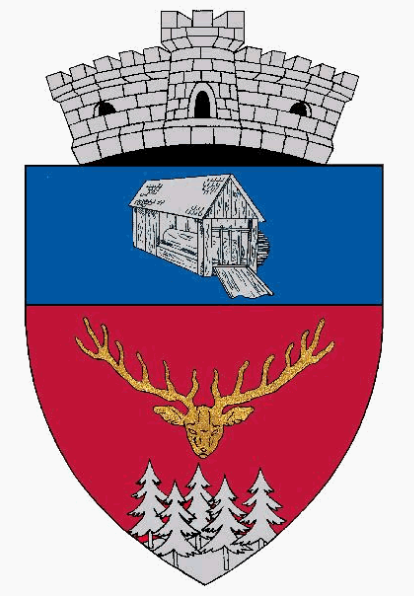
- Coat of arms

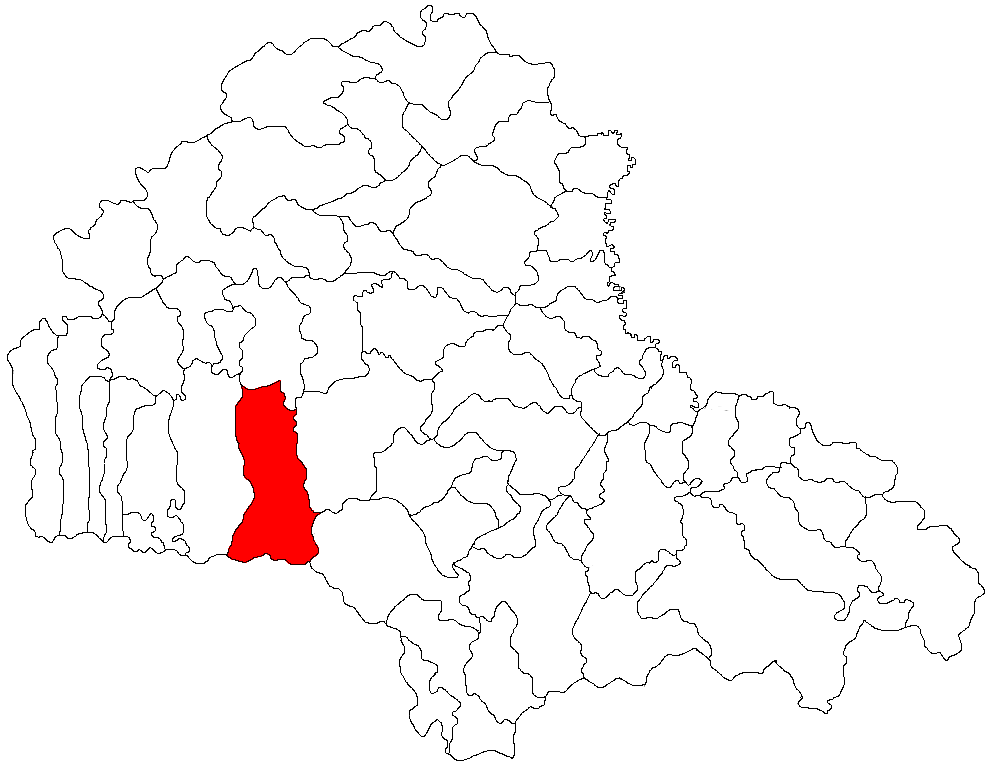
- Location within Brașov County

- Location in Romania
- Coordinates: 45°45′N 25°1′E
- Country: Romania
- County: Brașov

Government
  - Mayor (2020–2024): Daniel Dâmboiu (PNL)
- Area: 151.43 km^{2} (58.47 sq mi)
- Elevation: 510 m (1,670 ft)
- Population (2021-12-01): 2,508
  - Density: 16.56/km^{2} (42.90/sq mi)
- Time zone: UTC+02:00 (EET)
  - Summer (DST): UTC+03:00 (EEST)
- Postal code: 507090
- Area code: +(40) 02 68
- Vehicle reg.: BV
- Website: www.primariaharseni.ro

Hârseni (German: Scharkan; Hungarian: Herszény) is a commune in Brașov County, Transylvania, Romania. It is composed of five villages: Copăcel (Kopacsel), Hârseni, Măliniș (Malinis), Mărgineni (Marginen), and Sebeș (Sebes).

The commune is located in Țara Făgărașului, in the western part of the county, 15 km (9.3 mi) south-east of Făgăraș. It is traversed south to north by the Sebeș River, a left tributary of the Olt River.

Historical population
Year	Pop.	±%
1850	3,409	—
1900	3,767	+10.5%
2002	2,260	−40.0%
2011	2,103	−6.9%
2021	2,508	+19.3%
Source: Census data

== Natives ==
- Vasile Suciu (1873–1935), Greek-Catholic Metropolitan bishop of the Archdiocese of Făgăraș and Alba Iulia
- David Urs de Margina (1816–1897), military officer in the Imperial Austrian Army
