= Horia Sima =

Romanian legionnaire politician (1906–1993)

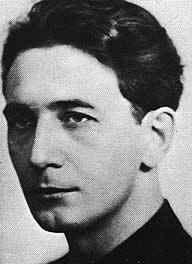

Vice President of the Council of Ministers
- In office 14 September 1940 – 20 January 1941
- Monarch: Michael I
- Prime Minister: Ion Antonescu
- Preceded by: Gheorghe Mihail
- Succeeded by: Mihai Antonescu

Minister of Culture and Religious Affairs
- In office 4 July 1940 – 8 July 1940
- Prime Minister: Ion Gigurtu
- Preceded by: Constantin C. Giurescu
- Succeeded by: Radu Budișteanu

Commander of the Iron Guard
- In office 16 June 1938 – 23 January 1941
- Preceded by: Corneliu Zelea Codreanu (as "Captain")
- Succeeded by: None (party banned)

Personal details
- Born: 3 July 1906 Mundra, Austria-Hungary (today Mândra, Romania)
- Died: 25 May 1993 (aged 86) Madrid, Spain
- Party: Iron Guard (1927–1941)
- Spouse: Elvira Florea
- Education: Radu Negru National College
- Alma mater: University of Bucharest
- Occupation: Teacher, writer, professor, politician
- Religion: Romanian Orthodox

Horia Sima (3 July 1906 – 25 May 1993) was a Romanian fascist politician and writer, best known as the second and last leader of the Romanian nationalist paramilitary movement known as the Iron Guard (also known as the Legion of the Archangel Michael). Sima was also the Vice President of the Council of Ministers and de facto co-leader in Ion Antonescu's National Legionary State. Sima had previously served briefly as State Secretary of Education under Gheorghe Tătărescu in 1940, and as a short-lived Minister of Religion and Arts in the government of Ion Gigurtu.

In January 1941, Sima initiated and led the Legionnaires' Rebellion against Conducător Ion Antonescu and the Romanian Army, for which he was sentenced to death, as well as the Bucharest pogrom, the largest and most violent pogrom against Jews in the history of Muntenia. Following the rebellion, Sima escaped to Germany, and later to Spain, where he lived until his death. In 1946, the Romanian People's Tribunals again sentenced Sima to death in absentia as a war criminal.

== In Romania ==
Sima was born on 3 July 1906 to Silvia and Gheorghe Sima in Mundra, Fogaras County, Transylvania, Kingdom of Hungary (today Mândra, Brașov County, Romania), although some sources incorrectly list his birthplace as the nearby city of Făgăraș and his birth year as 1907. Between 1926 and 1932, Horia Sima studied at the Faculty of Letters and Philosophy of the University of Bucharest, serving as councillor of the National Union of Christian Students of Romania. Beginning in 1932 he began to work as a high school teacher of logic, Latin, and philosophy in Caransebeș, later transferring to a school in Lugoj, and finally to Timișoara.

In October 1927, when a student, he joined the newly formed Iron Guard and became responsible for the Banat area. In the early 1930s, Sima participated in the Legion's "Excursions among the People", wherein Iron Guard members would promote their movement in rural areas among peasants, and had become a leading organizer for the Legion in Severin County by the 1930s. Sima was named in initial lists of Iron Guard electoral candidates for the 1933 Romanian general election, but the party was ultimately banned from participating. In 1935, he was promoted to the position of Legionary commander of the Timișoara region, and in the 1937 Romanian general elections, he ran as a candidate in Severin County. Sima became commander of the Iron Guard in late 1938 after its founder and leader, Corneliu Zelea Codreanu, was imprisoned and later murdered. The Iron Guard had initially formed an interim leadership including Sima, Ion Belgae, Iordache Nicoară, Ion Antoniu, and Radu Mironovici in April 1938, but by August, Sima remained the only leader not imprisoned by the Romanian government, eventually allowing him to bypass the hierarchy of leadership previously established and become leader of the Iron Guard. Prior to his ascension to leadership, tension had built significantly both within the organization and country-wide following a series of assassinations of Iron Guard members, including of Codreanu (who was killed by order of King Carol II).

In early 1939, Sima fled to Nazi Germany through Yugoslavia, wherein he and a number of Romanian exiles attempted to plan a coup; this plot was discovered by German police and a number of Legionnaires were arrested. In the summer of the same year, he was sent back to prepare for and conduct the assassination of the Romanian Prime Minister, Armand Călinescu, on 21 September 1939 — following Călinescu's murder, a group of Legionnaires led by Sima assumed control of Romania's national radio broadcaster.

After a power struggle for Legionary leadership between Sima and a splinter group led by Vasile Noveanu that had formed while in exile, Sima was brought in by the short-lived Gheorghe Tătărescu government to serve as state secretary within the Ministry of Education. He occupied this position for only six days, and the Tătărescu government resigned on 3 July. On 4 July 1940, he joined the cabinet of Ion Gigurtu as the undersecretary of state in the Ministry of Public Education, as well as Minister of Religion and Arts, alongside two other Iron Guard members. Sima resigned from the Gigurtu cabinet after only four days. Under this cabinet, antisemitism became codified in Romanian law, and by 9 August 1940, marriage between ethnic Romanians and Jews was prohibited, as was access to public education for Jews. Following the secession of Northern Transylvania to Hungary (known as the Second Vienna Award) on 30 August 1940, the Gigurtu government collapsed.

Beginning in August 1940, prior to this secession, the Iron Guard faction controlled by Sima began to organize for a coup against King Carol II in reaction to the concession of Northern Transylvania. Sima, alongside Nicolae Petrașcu, attempted to organize and arm groups of Legionnaires but managed to only gather about 1000 members willing to sacrifice themselves. On the occasion of the Second Vienna Award, Sima visited German authorities in an attempt to form an Axis-allied nationalist government, but left without success. By September he had prepared a manifesto for distribution and had set the date of the coup to 3 September. Due to a lack of manpower (only 500 of the intended 1,000 Legionnaires participated) the coup was not carried out as planned — Legionnaires and police officers exchanged gunfire and clashed in centres such as Brașov, Constanța and Bucharest, and by the end of the day most Legionnaires had surrendered. Although the coup was unsuccessful, it spurred a number of protests against Carol II, and by 4 September the King had appointed General Ion Antonescu to the position of Prime Minister, thus halting the uprising.

== National Legionary State ==
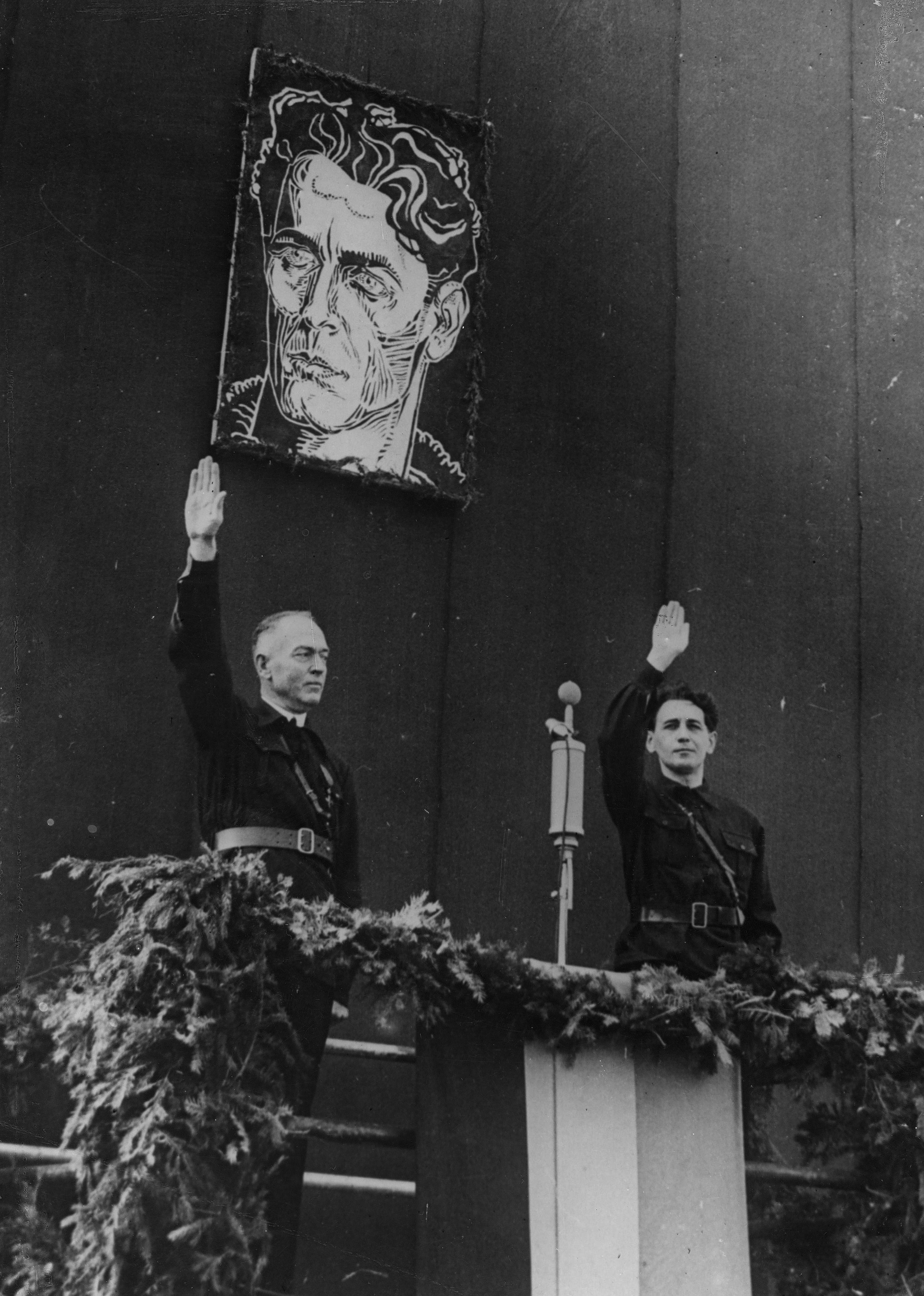
Ion Antonescu and Horia Sima in October 1940

In September 1940, Carol II abdicated and the Iron Guard entered a tense political alliance with General Ion Antonescu, forming what was proclaimed the National Legionary State. At that point, Sima was able to officially return from exile and rise to power as deputy prime minister in the new government, as well as resume his activities as leader of the Iron Guard in Romania. Sima appointed five Legionnaires into ministerial positions within the National Legionary State, and Legionnaires assumed leadership roles as prefects in each of Romania's administrative districts. Romanian territorial cessions in the summer of 1940, secretly implemented by his Nazi protectors, offered him the pretext for sparking a wave of xenophobic and antisemitic attacks. As a member of the government, Sima immediately initiated a series of brutal pogroms, assassinations, and de-possessions of Jews and competing politicians.

Tension and issues began to arise in Romania under the Sima-Antonescu partnership, and Antonescu became increasingly frustrated with the Iron Guard, telling Sima that it was now "...time for order and legality" and that Legionnaires would "not [be] allowed to demand audiences with the Ministers whenever they want." Additionally, Sima had failed to win the total support of his German allies, who feared that the Legionnaires were unprepared to administer the country effectively. Infrastructure in Bucharest began to fail, and following a November earthquake, a number of deaths and the destruction of buildings in the capital further exposed the government's disorganization. By the end of 1940, prices fluctuated greatly and crops began to fail, producing 70% less food than the year prior. Frustration from citizens and Legionnaires fell on Sima, and Ion Zelea Codreanu, Corneliu's father, referred to Sima as "a Satan, in whom the soul of Stelescu lives" (referencing the dissident Legionnaire Mihai Stelescu, who was accused of plotting to assassinate Codreanu). Sima responded to dissent within the Iron Guard by placing a number of prominent Legionnaires under house arrest, including Corneliu Zelea Codreanu's brothers and father. Alongside a group of dissatisfied Legionnaires, the senior Codreanu occupied the Iron Guard's Bucharest headquarters, the Casa Verde, and attempted a putsch. A number of Legionnaires also called for Sima's assassination. A movement within the Iron Guard soon arose to clear the late Corneliu Zelea Codreanu of his treason charges, and his body was exhumed.

Both Sima and Antonescu were invited by the German government to Obersalzberg to meet with Adolf Hitler in order to mediate relations between the two Romanian leaders and to discuss German-Romanian relations. Sima refused to attend the meeting, citing both apprehension regarding the flight and that he felt it improper for both leaders to leave the country. Thus, Antonescu met with Hitler alone on 14 January 1941. By 17 January, encouraged by Hitler, relations between Antonescu and Sima ceased to exist, and the General had published an open letter denouncing Sima and accusing him of maintaining an "anti-national attitude".

In January 1941, the Iron Guard, increasingly dissatisfied with their suppression by Antonescu, staged a three-day rebellion, commonly known as the Legionnaire's Rebellion. Antonescu prompted Adolf Hitler to choose between the military wing of the Romanian government and the Iron Guard. When Hitler decided to back him over the Guard, Antonescu proceeded with the suppression of the Legion. In the Bucharest pogrom, staged alongside this power struggle, Iron Guardists destroyed synagogues, vandalized and ransacked Jewish homes and stores, and killed and tortured 121 Jews (as well as an additional 30 in smaller towns, specifically in Ploiești and Constanța). In addition to widespread torture and rape of Jews, the Legionary Movement was responsible for the mock shechita of five Jews, including a five-year-old girl, who had their stomachs cut open, entrails removed, and were hung from meat hooks and labelled "Kosher" in a Bucharest slaughterhouse. According to then-American minister to Romania, Franklin Mitt Gunther, "Sixty Jewish corpses were discovered on the hooks used for carcasses. They were all skinned... and the quantity of blood about was evidence that they had been skinned alive".

== Exile ==
Unlike most Legionnaires, who were imprisoned by Antonescu following the suppression of the coup attempt, Sima escaped imprisonment. Being secretly housed first at the Sicherheitsdienst headquarters in Bucharest, Sima was evacuated on 23 January and hidden in the home of the Gestapo representative to Romania, but soon moved to his sister's residence in Bucharest. Soon after he was again moved by the Sicherheitsdienst to Brașov, and finally to Sibiu, disguised as an SS officer. Sima, alongside a number of other hidden Legionnaires, was able to leave Romania for Germany via Bulgaria, where they were placed in a villa in Berlin, with a large group of Legionnaires living in nearby Berkenbrück. Though at first enjoying freedom of movement in Berlin, Sima and his companions were moved to Berkenbrück on 19 April 1941 and placed under strict surveillance. Meanwhile, Romanian authorities sentenced him (on 16 June 1941) to 12 years hard labour in absentia to ensure his permanent exile.

In 1942, Sima escaped and fled to Italy, but was soon extradited back to Germany on the orders of Galeazzo Ciano. In his political journal, on 26 December 1942, Ciano wrote that, "Since [Sima] got out of Germany with a false passport, Himmler demands his extradition. For my part, I advised the Duce to grant his extradition forthwith, especially since his presence here would create friction with Antonescu. And then, all things considered, there will be one less crook." After travelling to Italy, having disobeyed a contract signed with Germany meant to limit the political activities of the exiled Legionnaires, Sima and the others exiled were imprisoned in a special, humane section of the Buchenwald concentration camp specifically meant for Iron Guard members. By October 1943, Sima had been sentenced once more in Romania, this time to a lifetime of hard labour, a fine of 10,000 lei, and five years of correctional imprisonment.

While interned at Buchenwald, Sima was faced with the dissent of several groups of Legionnaires who distanced themselves from his policies, stating that they did not approve of the way in which he had run the country and the movement, and who began to appeal to the German supervisors for distinctions to be made in their case. Constantin Papanace, a leading Legionary figure who had served as the undersecretary of the State Department of Finance under the National Legionary State, would later describe Sima as a "terrorist", noting that he "[took] advantage of and abused... his connections", and that Sima possessed "non-discipline... [and] a dangerous dilettantism, not to mention infantilism." Legionnaires increasingly began to blame Sima's leadership of the Iron Guard for the death of Codreanu, citing his previous actions as commander in 1938 as "terroristic" and "tumultuous". This controversy was to enforce the split which is still present in the political legacy of the Iron Guard. By 1943, the Iron Guard — now in exile in Rostock, Germany — had split into at least three distinct groups with separate leadership, not including the Legionnaires who considered Sima their legitimate leader. Sima was transferred to Sachsenhausen-Oranienburg in April 1943, where he would be detained in a prison cell until August 1944.

When Romania changed sides in World War II, joining the Allies in August 1944, Sima was released and instructed to create a pro-Nazi puppet government-in-exile in Vienna, and would broadcast instructions to fascist battalions via German radio. As the Soviet offensive proved unstoppable, he fled to Altaussee under the alias Josef Weber. Living in Paris, in Italy, and finally in Spain, he was sentenced to death in Romania in 1946.

During his exile, the question of leadership within the Iron Guard was still a salient issue, and the now-disjointed organization was fraught with infighting and factionalism. In January 1954, Sima was formally and publicly "disowned" by the Legionary Movement through a 13-page document published in Vatra magazine after controversy arose over the alleged existence of an illegitimate child: on 6 November 1948, Mardarie Popinciuc, a Romanian living in exile in Argentina, forwarded a letter to Legionary leaders alleging that Sima had illegitimately fathered the child of a fellow Legionnaire identified only as "B" while in France, a claim supposedly backed by the mother of the child and a number of other Legionnaires. The publication of these accusations in Vatra, alongside other political tensions, caused the resignation of a number of members of the Guard, as well as the foundation of a new faction named "Moța-Marin" under the leadership of Ovidiu Găină. Central Intelligence Agency documents claim that Sima, in light of these allegations, had originally planned to end his career by parachuting into Romania, where he had previously been sentenced to death following two separate trials. In addition to this split and the formation of the "Moța-Marin" group, there also existed controversies surrounding Sima's politics and policies: one splinter group denounced Sima's leadership as "reactionary" and "doomed to failure," and a further number of distinct groups with conflicting ideologies, tactics, and leadership formed.

Until the 1990s, Sima attempted to form connections with mainstream ideologies of anti-Communism, insisting on the Guard's allegiance to the Free World. The party oriented itself towards denunciations of Communist Romania, and Sima continued to publish ideological literature in exile in Spain, including a monthly newsletter titled "Țara și Exilul" ("The Country and Exile"), which found readership in Israel, Australia, Germany, and the United States. This adoption of a new image was, in part, successful — beginning in 1949, the United States helped to fund NATO missions to parachute Iron Guard members into Romania in an attempt to undermine the socialist government. Sima and other exiled Guardists participated in the Yaroslav Stetsko-headed Anti-Bolshevik Bloc of Nations as well as the World Anti-Communist League. In Spain, Sima forged close connections with several Francoist and Falangist politicians, including Luis Carrero Blanco and Blas Piñar. He also continued to lead (or be affiliated with) Legionary front organizations in Canada, the United States, Germany, Austria, and France.

After the death of his wife Elvira in 1974, Sima resided with fellow exiled Iron Guard member Gheorghe Costea in Madrid, and the two used funds from publishing and donations as income. From the 1970s onwards, Sima published a series of anti-communist, anti-Masonic, and antisemitic books through Blas Piñar's Fuerza Nueva Editorial.

Sima reportedly died in Madrid on 25 May 1993, aged 86, although some sources cite his place of death as Augsburg, Germany. He was buried near his wife Elvira Sima in Torredembarra, near Barcelona, Spain.

== Selected writings ==
- Destinée du nationalisme (Paris: P.E.G., 1951)
- Europe at the crossroads: war or capitulation? (Munich: Verlag "Vestitorii", 1955)
- Dos movimientos nacionales: José Antonio Primo de Rivera y Corneliu Zelea Codreanu (Madrid: Europa, 1960)
- The Rumanian situation after 19 years of Communist slavery and policies of the western powers, 1944-1963; a declaration by the Rumanian Legionary Movement (Rio de Janeiro: Graf. Ed. NAP S/A, 1963)
- Articole politice, 1950-1963 (Madrid: Colecția "Omul Nou", 1967)
- Qué es el comunismo? (Madrid: Fuerza Nueva Editorial, 1970)
- Qué es el nacionalismo? (Madrid: Fuerza Nueva Editorial, 1971)
- Histoire du Mouvement Légionnaire (Rio de Janeiro, 1972) (translated as The History of the Legionary Movement [England: Legionary Press, 1995])
- El hombre cristiano y la acción política (Madrid: Fuerza Nueva Editorial, 1974) (with Blas Piñar)
- Sfârșitul unei domnii sângeroase (Madrid: Editura Mișcării Legionare, 1977)
- Técnica de lucha contra el comunismo (Madrid: Fuerza Nueva Editorial, 1980)
- Era libertății: Statul Național-Legionar vol. 1 (Madrid: Editura Mișcării Legionare, 1982); vol. 2 (Madrid: Editura Mișcării Legionare, 1986)
- Prizonieri ai puterilor axei (Madrid: Editura Mișcării Legionare, 1990)
- Guvernul național român dela Viena (Madrid: Editura Mișcării Legionare, 1993)
