= Ion Gigurtu =

Romanian politician (1886–1959)

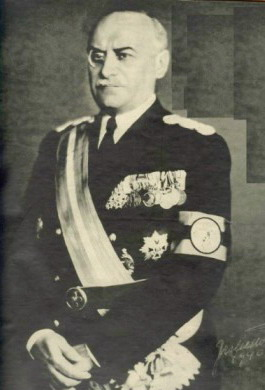

Prime Minister of Romania
- In office 4 July 1940 – 5 September 1940
- Monarch: Carol II
- Preceded by: Gheorghe Tătărescu
- Succeeded by: Ion Antonescu

Personal details
- Born: 24 June 1886 Turnu Severin, Romania
- Died: 24 November 1959 (aged 73) Râmnicu Sărat, Romania
- Party: People's Party (to 1932); National Agrarian Party (1932-1935); National Christian Party (1935-1938); National Renaissance Front (1938-1940); Party of the Nation (1940)
- Parents: Petre Gigurtu (father); Olga Gigurtu (mother)
- Profession: Officer, industrialist

Military service
- Allegiance: Kingdom of Romania
- Branch/service: Romanian Land Forces
- Battles/wars: Second Balkan War; World War I; World War II

Ion Gigurtu (Romanian pronunciation: [iˈon d͡ʒiˈɡurtu]; 24 June 1886 – 24 November 1959) was a Romanian far-right politician, Land Forces officer, engineer and industrialist who served a brief term as Prime Minister from 4 July to 4 September 1940, under the personal regime of King Carol II. A specialist in mining and veteran of both the Second Balkan War and World War I, he made a fortune in interwar Greater Romania. Gigurtu began his career in politics with the People's Party (PP) and the National Agrarian Party, moving closer to the far right during the 1930s, and serving as Minister of Industry and Commerce in the cabinet of Octavian Goga. Shortly after the start of World War II, Gigurtu was affiliated with King Carol's National Renaissance Front, serving as Public Works and Communications Minister and Foreign Minister under Premier Gheorghe Tătărescu, before the territorial losses incurred by Romania in front of the Soviet Union propelled him as Tătărescu's replacement.

Gigurtu's executive was primarily noted for realizing the inability of France and the United Kingdom to guarantee Romania's borders and, accordingly, for the alignment with Nazi Germany. As part of this program, Gigurtu most notably enforced official antisemitism and racial discrimination, implementing locally a version of the Nuremberg Laws. Despite such measures, the government fell after being compelled by Germany to accept the cession of Northern Transylvania to Hungary, and was consequently forced to resign amidst nationwide protests. Gigurtu retreated from public life for the rest of the war, and, following the pro-Allied coup of August 1944, was arrested, investigated and released several times. Ultimately prosecuted by the newly proclaimed Communist regime as part of a show trial, he eventually died in prison.

== Biography ==
=== Early life ===
Born in Turnu Severin to General Petre Gigurtu and his wife Olga (the daughter of Barbu Bălcescu), he attended primary school and gymnasium in his native city, followed by high school in Craiova. He then went to the German Empire, pursuing secondary studies at the Bergakademie in Freiberg and the Technische Hochschule in Charlottenburg and becoming a mining engineer. From 1912 to 1916, he worked as an industrial inspector at the Romanian Ministry of Industry and Commerce. During the Second Balkan War in 1913, he was a sub-lieutenant gathering intelligence for Army Corps I headquarters. From 1916 to 1918, he fought in Romanian campaign of World War I, first as a lieutenant and then as a captain. He was a founding member of the Romanian Society of Industry and Commerce (SERIC) in October 1919, and was head of the Mica Society from its founding in the spring of 1921 until October 1944. He was also president of the Nitrogen Society and of the Discount Bank (Banca de Scont).

Joining Alexandru Averescu's People's Party after World War I, Gigurtu was not particularly active in politics during the 1920s and into the '30s, although he did serve in the Chamber of Deputies from 1926 to 1927. In mid-1927, he was part of the Romanian delegation to the Geneva Naval Conference. In April 1932, he followed Octavian Goga into the National Agrarian faction, a splinter group of the PP. In July 1937, the Industry and Commerce Ministry nominated him as a specialist on the Superior Economic Council. Aside from this party and the PP, he helped finance the mainstream National Peasants' Party and National Liberal Party, as well as the fascist National Christians and the Iron Guard. During Goga's brief leadership of a National Christian cabinet (December 1937–February 1938), he was Minister of Industry and Commerce. The 1930s also saw him involved in journalistic activity on economic, domestic and foreign policy issues; he was founder and owner of the magazine Libertatea (January 1933–December 1940).

Gigurtu, as a "pro-Nazi industrialist", was a friend of Hermann Göring.

=== Rise to power ===
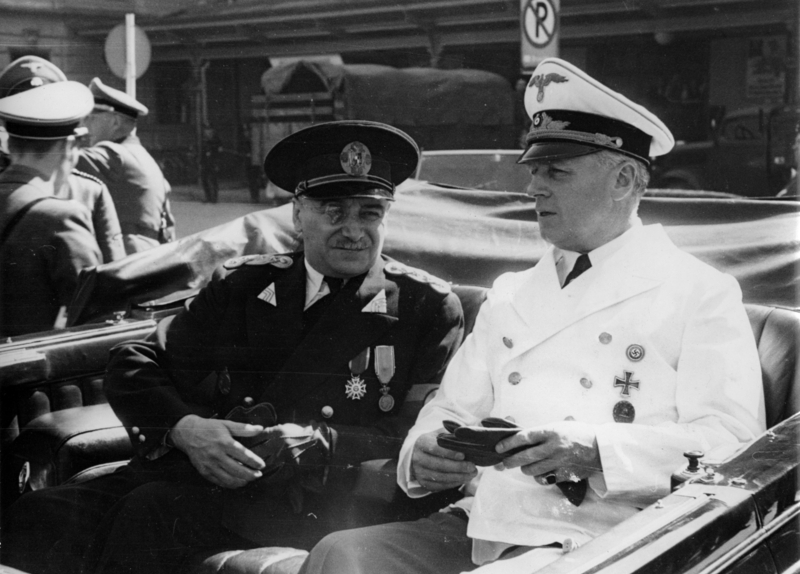
Gigurtu (left) with Joachim von Ribbentrop in Salzburg, July 1940

Following his imposition of a royal dictatorship, Carol II reconfirmed Gigurtu as a member of the Superior Economic Council in April 1938. He then made him Public Works and Communications Minister (November 1939–June 1940), Foreign Minister (1–28 June 1940) and state secretary with ministerial rank (28 June–4 July 1940) in successive cabinets led by Gheorghe Tătărescu. This coincided with a dire situation, in which the Soviet Union pressured Romania into ceding the regions of Bessarabia and Northern Bukovina (see Soviet occupation of Bessarabia and Northern Bukovina). As a member of the specially-convened Crown Council, Gigurtu himself participated in the decision to accept Soviet demands. As the country was left isolated when its alliance with the United Kingdom and France crumbled, and came under increasing pressure from Nazi Germany, Carol dismissed Tătărescu. Earlier, Gigurtu's appointment as Foreign Minister had marked a turn toward Germany: he was replacing the Western-oriented Grigore Gafencu, who favoured a continuation of Romania's policy of official neutrality, and this immediately led to a treaty committing delivery of a fixed quantity of Romanian petroleum to Germany in exchange for military equipment.

The king turned to Gigurtu to be his next prime minister—he was by then a wealthy industrialist who, aside from being a committed Germanophile well liked by Nazi circles, had good economic relations with important German businessmen. Gigurtu was also seen as a politically sound choice from a domestic viewpoint: loyal to the dictatorship, he had been part of the leadership of the ruling National Renaissance Front since the previous January, and oversaw its transformation into the more overtly totalitarian "Party of the Nation" shortly before becoming premier. With this move, Carol hoped to reverse or at least delay implementation of Germany's decision to grant part of Transylvania region to Hungary. The part played by political circumstances in bringing Gigurtu to the premiership was highlighted by National Peasants' Party leader and Carol opponent Iuliu Maniu, who described the new head of government as "the most accidental prime minister of Romania". The cabinet too was meant to please the Axis: Foreign Minister Mihail Manoilescu was well-perceived in Nazi Germany and Fascist Italy, and the pro-German Iron Guard was given three portfolios, one of which was initially held by its leader Horia Sima. The latter resigned just three days after taking over leadership of the Culture Ministry, when Carol rejected his demand for an all-Guardist cabinet. The longest-held such office was the specially-created Ministry for the Inventory of Public Wealth, presided upon by Vasile Noveanu until September 3.

=== Policies, loss of Northern Transylvania and downfall ===
After his appointment, Gigurtu announced he would work to integrate Romania into the Axis sphere, taking a series of steps in that direction: withdrawal from the League of Nations (11 July); the signing of a new accord with Germany, assigning all grain surplus to that country and its allies (8 August); a ban on strike actions; arrests and detention in prison camps of left-wing politicians; and suspension of an already rubber-stamp legislative assembly. One of the most far-reaching of these consequences targeted the Jewish Romanian community, and expanded on previous antisemitic legislation passed by the Goga executive. He thus upheld a decree-law revising the citizenship status of Jews, around a claim that many of them had illegally settled in Romania after 1919 (about a third of the total, or 225,222 individuals, had been stripped of their citizenship). Gigurtu also officially imposed racial antisemitism, adopting laws which defined as Jewish any third-generation descendant of a Jew (as opposed to Romanians "by blood"), and declaring that the definition of a Jew no longer depended on affiliation to Judaism (and was not altered by conversion to Christianity). The law also instituted racial segregation, banning Jews from public service, removing them from all walks of life, and preventing marriages between Jews and Christians. Male Jews were no longer allowed to perform service in the army, but instead were required to perform community work for the state (muncă de interes obștesc). This was in effect the application of criteria borrowed from Nazism and the German Nuremberg Laws. This antisemitic legislation, comprising two decrees, was enacted on 9 August 1940, available for all of the Romanian territories. In spite of these measures, he was unable to change Adolf Hitler's attitude toward Carol, whom the former considered to be hampering German interests in Romania.

From late June to mid-July, the king exchanged several letters with Hitler who, using an ultimatum-like tone, demanded that Carol make territorial concessions to Hungary and Bulgaria, promising to guarantee Romania's new borders. Gigurtu, accompanied by Manoilescu, met Hitler and Ribbentrop at Berghof on 26 July. The Germans recommended the Romanian side immediately satisfy Hungary's demands through proposals and direct negotiations. The following day, they met Duce Benito Mussolini and Italian Foreign Minister Galeazzo Ciano in Rome, suggesting that negotiations with Hungary and Bulgaria should start with population exchanges, with the borders adjusted later. A key point of Gigurtu's mandate was to convince the Germans that Romania considered Transylvania much more important than Bessarabia, a position stated by the premier in his 27 August letter to Joachim von Ribbentrop, the German Minister of Foreign Affairs. In the face of pressure and threats from the Axis, separate negotiations took place with Hungary and Bulgaria in August; the former necessitated intervention by Germany and Fascist Italy and resulted in the loss of Northern Transylvania in the Second Vienna Award, while the latter led to the cession of Southern Dobruja and a population exchange in early September after the signing of the Treaty of Craiova.

Following numerous protests against what was popularly labelled the "Vienna Diktat", Gigurtu's cabinet resigned on September 4, replaced within a few days by the monarch's rival Ion Antonescu. The Iron Guard, which had been plotting a coup d'état against Carol after 3 September, negotiated a partnership with Antonescu, setting up the fascist-inspired National Legionary State (which was to crumble during Sima's 1941 rebellion). Reportedly, Gigurtu's decision to resign had been taken after the infuriated king told him to execute fifteen arrested Guardists, therefore aiding the rapprochement between Carol's opponents.

=== Final years, arrests and death ===
Gigurtu stayed in Romania for the remainder of World War II. Arrested on 5 October 1944, after the 23 August coup d'état and Antonescu's fall, he was held under house arrest in a Bucharest building starting in January 1945. He was held under a special law allowing for the arrest of those who "had conducted pro-German policies and who ceded Transylvania"; following Northern Transylvania's retrocession to Romania in March 1945, the investigation stopped, his file was closed and Gigurtu was freed in June 1946. After this, he wished to return to direct his businesses, but pro-Communist prime minister Petru Groza advised him it would be better both for him and for his firms if he remained well away from them, which he did. Over the next two years, he was arrested and freed a number of times, his penultimate arrest being in December 1948, a year after the imposition of a Communist regime.

Finally, on the night of 5–6 May 1950, Gigurtu was arrested, together with other former dignitaries of the monarchical period, and sent to Sighet Prison. In the summer of 1956, most surviving political detainees were freed, except for former prime ministers, justice ministers, and interior ministers, who were accused of "intense activity against the working class". Gigurtu had been held without trial at Sighet for nearly six years, but was finally judged in a public show trial and sentenced to fifteen years' imprisonment. His appeal was rejected, and three years later, gravely ill and in serious pain, he died in the penitentiary at Râmnicu Sărat. Gigurtu was rehabilitated by the Romanian Supreme Court in 1999.

== Essays ==
- Dezvoltarea industriei în România ("The Development of Industry in Romania", 1916)
- Posibilitățile de refacere și dezvoltare a industriei în România ("Prospects for the Reconstruction and Development of Industry in Romania", 1918)
- Industria mecanică metalurgică. Studiu economico-statistic ("The Mechanical Metalworking Industry. An Economic and Statistical Study")
- Politica minieră a Statului cu privire la exploatațiile metalifere ("The State's Mining Policy in Respect to Metalworking Sites", 1931)
