= Văitoianu cabinet =

Văitoianu Cabinet
- Cabinet of Romania

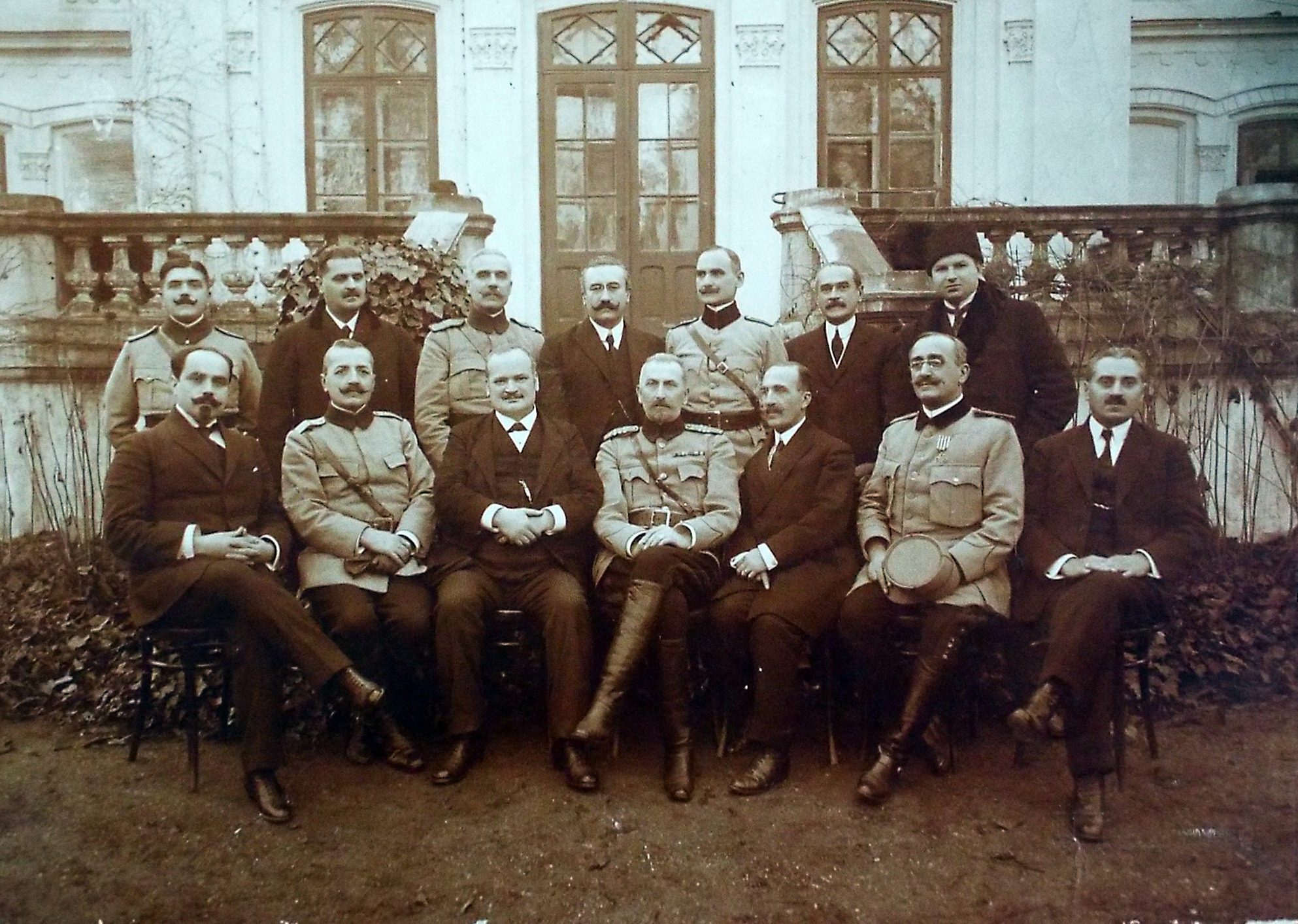
- Date formed: 27 September 1919
- Date dissolved: 30 November 1919

People and organisations
- Head of government: Artur Văitoianu
- No. of ministers: 16
- Member party: National Liberal Party

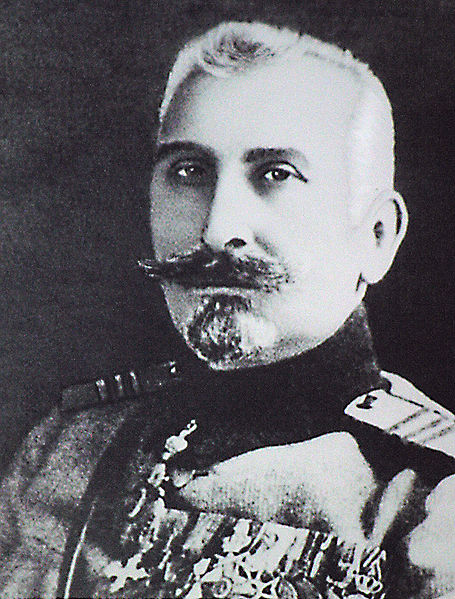
Artur Văitoianu

The cabinet of Artur Văitoianu was the government of Romania from 27 September to 30 November 1919.

== Composition ==
The ministers of the cabinet were as follows:

- President of the Council of Ministers:

- Gen. Artur Văitoianu (27 September - 30 November 1919)

- Minister of the Interior:

- Gen. Artur Văitoianu (27 September - 30 November 1919)

- Minister of Foreign Affairs:

- (interim) Gen. Artur Văitoianu (27 September - 15 October 1919)
- Nicolae Mișu (15 October - 30 November 1919)

- Minister of Finance:

- (interim) Gen. Ioan Popescu (27 September - 6 October 1919)
- Ion Angelescu (6 October - 30 November 1919)

- Minister of Justice:

- Emanuil Miclescu (27 September - 30 November 1919)

- Minister of Religious Affairs and Public Instruction:

- Gen. Alexandru Lupescu (27 September - 30 November 1919)

- Minister of War:

- Gen. Ioan Rășcanu (27 September - 30 November 1919)

- Minister of Public Works:

- Gen. Ștefan Mihail (27 September - 30 November 1919)

- Minister of Industry and Commerce:

- Gen. Ioan Popescu (27 September - 30 November 1919)

- Minister of Agriculture and Property:

- Gen. Ioan Popovici (27 September - 30 November 1919)

Ministers without portfolio (for Bessarabia):

- Ion Inculeț (27 September - 30 November 1919)
- Daniel Ciugureanu (27 September - 30 November 1919)

Ministers without portfolio (for Bukovina):

- Ion Nistor (27 September - 30 November 1919)

Ministers without portfolio (for Transylvania):

- Alexandru Vaida-Voievod (27 September - 30 November 1919)
- Vasile Goldiș (27 September - 30 November 1919)
- Ștefan Cicio Pop (27 September - 30 November 1919)

Preceded by Fifth Ion I. C. Brătianu cabinet	Cabinet of Romania; 27 September 1919 - 30 November 1919	Succeeded by First Vaida-Voevod cabinet
