= Dragoș Vodă National College (Sighetu Marmației) =

Coordinates: 47.9308°N 23.8870°E

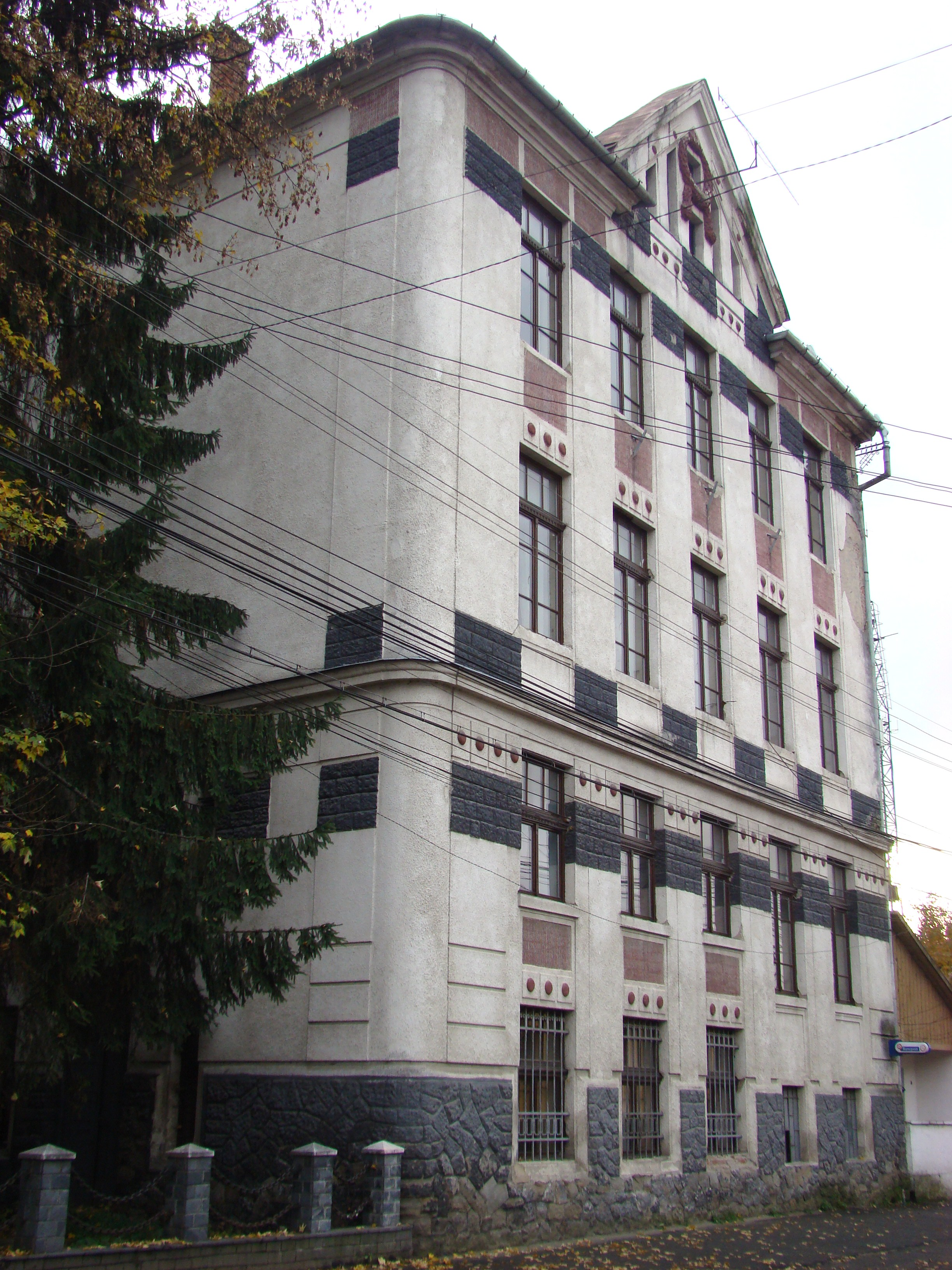
Dragoș Vodă National College

Dragoș Vodă National College (Romanian: Colegiul Național "Dragoș Vodă") is a high school located at 14 Mihai Viteazul Street, Sighetu Marmației, Romania.

== History ==
=== Founding and interwar period ===
In 1919, following the union of Transylvania with Romania, the Directing Council, which was the region’s provisional government, decided to establish 20 Romanian state high schools, among them Dragoș Vodă. Named after Dragoș, Voivode of Moldavia, it was the first high school in Maramureș in which Romanian was the language of instruction. The opening ceremony took place on October 10, with Vasile Lucaciu in attendance. During the first year, 137 boys attended, taught by twelve faculty members and two religion teachers. 108 were from Maramureș; 88 came from rural areas, and 20 from Sighet.

Starting with the 1920–1921 academic year, the institution moved into the former Roman Catholic high school. In its third year, a Hungarian-language section opened. Over the course of the 1920s, various administrative matters such as examinations, grading system, an academic calendar and a school uniform were decided upon. The focus was on developing a basic general culture for students, who were expected to acquire introductory knowledge about a variety of cultural and scientific subjects.

In 1938, the new National Renaissance Front regime introduced Straja Țării structures to Dragoș Vodă. The activities of the organization were popular with students: sports, marches, songs, trips, building shelters, morning gymnastics. Thursday was Straja day; regular classes were canceled.

=== Hungarian interregnum ===
In 1940, the Second Vienna Award granted Northern Transylvania to Regency Hungary. The new regime immediately dissolved all but one Romanian high school in the region. Right after Hungarian troops entered Maramureș on September 5, Dragoș Vodă was transferred to the Piarists and became a Roman Catholic high school. A number of teachers fled or were fired. In November, a Piarist friar who taught classics was named principal. In October 1941, the school acquired a quasi-military aspect, as students were enrolled in the Levente Association, training four times a week.

Starting with the 1940-1941 year, Hungarian became the language of instruction. At first, a slightly modified version of the Romanian curriculum was used. Starting with the second semester, the Hungarian curriculum was adopted. Of 289 pupils, 241 were Hungarian, 35 Romanian and 13 Jews, Germans and Ukrainians. By 1942-1943, there were 344 students, counted by religion: 214 Roman Catholics, 108 Greek Catholics, 9 Jews, 7 Romanian Orthodox and 2 Unitarians.

In the first year of Hungarian administration, there were 16 teachers, of whom 3 were Piarists. In the third year, 8 of 20 belonged to the order. The teachers were a mixture of veterans from the Romanian-era school, Hungarian teachers from Transylvania and others brought in from Hungary proper. Pursuant to a military order, the existing library books were burned in the schoolyard.

=== Transition to communism ===
In October 1944, Hungarian forces were driven out of Sighet by the Romanian Army, and Dragoș Vodă reopened in mid-November. There were 525 students for 1944-1945: 314 Romanians, 197 Hungarians and 14 Ukrainians. In January 1945, the school building was converted into a Soviet military hospital, successively moving to three temporary locations before returning to its old building in August 1946. In early 1945, amidst efforts to annex Maramureș to the Ukrainian SSR, there was an effort to impose Ukrainian-language instruction on the Romanian pupils, which the faculty resisted.

Beginning in 1945, the Romanian Communist Party-dominated government of Petru Groza began to introduce Soviet textbooks and to purge faculty members, although the school resisted full communization until June 1948. Its archive, initially believed to have been lost in 1940, was discovered at the Gheorghe Lazăr High School in Sibiu in 1946, and returned.

A report of January 1946 noted that “pro-fascist” students “chanted Rădescu’s slogans and sang imperialist anti-Soviet war songs”. In August 1948, the new communist regime arrested 17 students and a teacher, Aurel Vișovan, detaining them at Sighet Prison. Charged with "conspiracy against the social order", they were tried at Cluj and sentenced to lengthy prison terms. After their eventual release, the Securitate secret police continued to monitor them.

=== Early communist period ===
Upon the proclamation of the Romanian People's Republic at the end of 1947, portraits of the royal family were taken down, and textbooks mentioning the monarchy were withdrawn. More drastic changes took place after a law on education was adopted in June 1948: a vertical command structure was put in place, and all schools used the same textbooks, which promoted the communist ideology. In August 1948, the local girls’ high school merged with the boys’ one; at the same time, the name of Dragoș Vodă was dropped. Two years later, it was named after Filimon Sârbu. From 1960-1961, there were three sections: Romanian, Hungarian, and Ukrainian.

During the 1950s, various aspects of the Soviet education system were imported: the calendar was divided into quarters rather than semesters, grades were given on a scale of 1 to 5 rather than 10, and 11th grade was the final year. These experiments were short-lived, and the latter was the final one to be dropped. Beginning with the 1964–1965 year, 12th grade was reintroduced, with a focus on deepening students’ specialization during the final two years.

=== Late communism ===
Starting in the late 1960s, the school began to modernize. Audio-visual learning and robotics were emphasized, while a push for foreign language instruction culminated with the opening of a specialized laboratory. In the 1970s, the Dragoş Vodă name returned, this time as an industrial high school. It had several sections: mathematics-physics, mechanics, electromechanics, light industry and later construction. The move created opposition, as the historical, pre-1950 Maramureș County was left without a high school dedicated to arts and culture; such institutions could only be found in the new, post-1968 county seat of Baia Mare.

Due to her opposition to these changes, the longtime principal was dismissed in 1977. By the early 1980s, the school had 22 science classrooms and 7 laboratories. Over the course of the decade, students won prizes at national and international mathematics olympiads and organized exhibits of products they created. Also during the period, which marked the final stage of Nicolae Ceaușescu's cult of personality, a cumulative hundreds of students participated in the Daciada and Cântarea României competitions.

=== Since 1989 ===
Teachers and students greeted the Romanian Revolution of December 1989 with enthusiasm. In short order, ideological subjects were dropped, as were forced labor and technical courses such as locksmithing, mechanics and auto parts. The freed hours were dedicated to computer science, religion, civic activities and a renewed emphasis on philology, foreign languages, logic, psychology, and world literature.

Dragoș Vodă was declared a national college in 1999, in time for its 80th anniversary. In subsequent years, the faculty introduced specialized courses in computer science, mathematics, physics, and chemistry.

The school building, which dates to 1913, is listed as a historic monument by Romania's Ministry of Culture and Religious Affairs.
