= Leul =

Leul or Leoul may refer to:

== Aristocratic and court titles ==
- Le'ul, Leoul or Leul, an Ethiopian title meaning "prince"

== People ==
- Leul Abate, Ethiopian pilot

== Places ==
- Guenete Leul Palace ("Paradise of Princes"), a royal palace in Addis Ababa, Ethiopia
- Monument to the Heroes of the Engineer Arm – often called Leul ("the Lion"), a monument in Bucharest, Romania
