= Second Averescu cabinet =

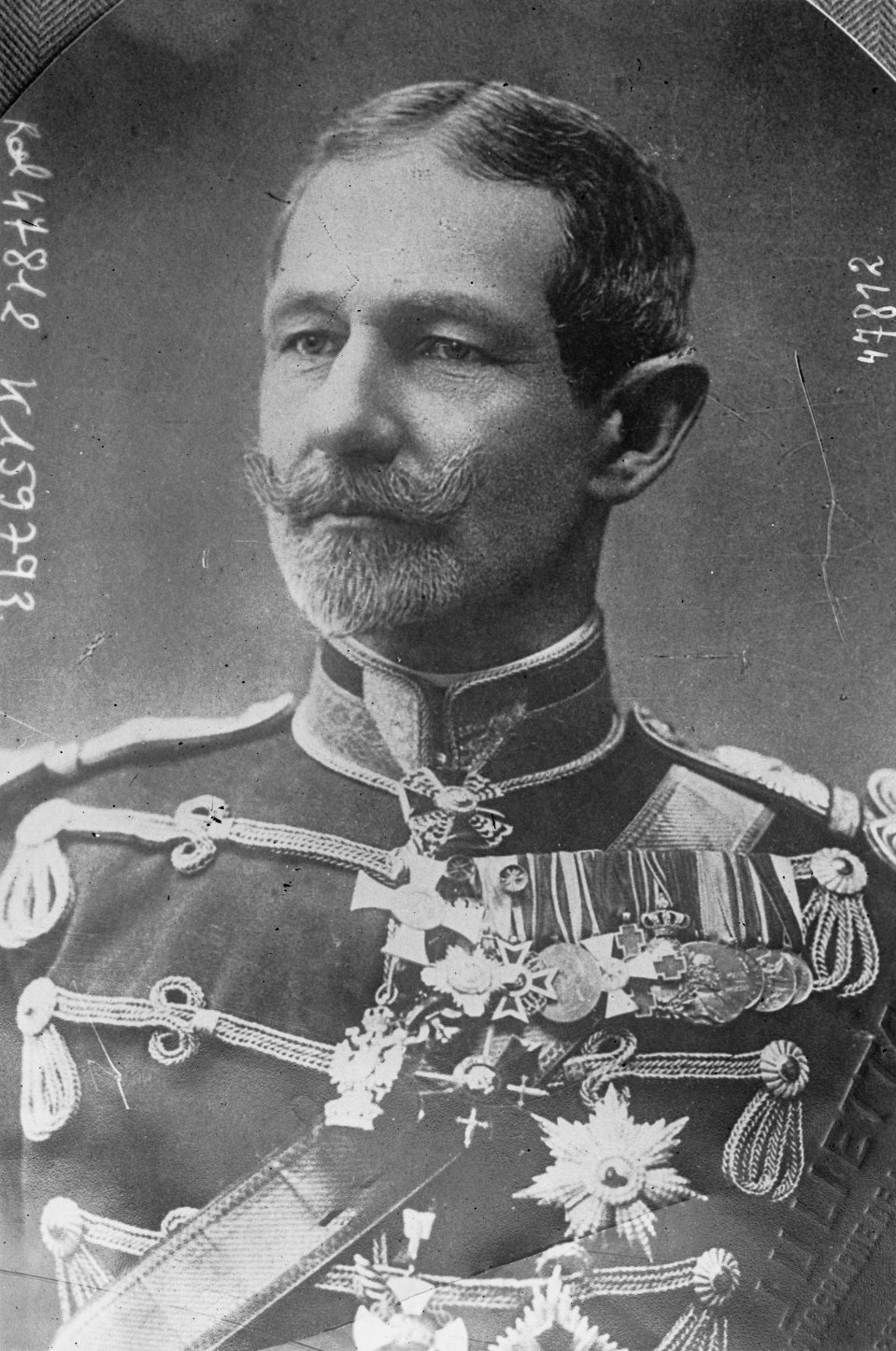
Alexandru Averescu

The second cabinet of Alexandru Averescu was the government of Romania from 13 March 1920 to 16 December 1921.

== Composition ==
The ministers of the cabinet were as follows:

- President of the Council of Ministers:

- Gen. Alexandru Averescu (13 March 1920 - 16 December 1921)

- Minister of the Interior:

- Gen. Alexandru Averescu (13 March - 13 June 1920)
- Constantin Argetoianu (13 June 1920 - 16 December 1921)

- Minister of Foreign Affairs:

- Duiliu Zamfirescu (13 March - 13 June 1920)
- Take Ionescu (13 June 1920 - 16 December 1921)

- Minister of Finance:

- Constantin Argetoianu (13 March - 13 June 1920)
- Nicolae Titulescu (13 June 1920 - 16 December 1921)

- Minister of Justice:

- (interim) Constantin Argetoianu (13 - 30 March 1920)
- Matei Cantacuzino (30 March - 27 August 1920)
- (interim) Dimitrie Greceanu (27 August - 16 November 1920)
- Dimitrie Greceanu (16 November 1920 - 1 January 1921)
- Mihai Antonescu (1 January - 16 December 1921)

- Minister of War:

- Gen. Ioan Rășcanu (13 March 1920 - 16 December 1921)

- Minister of Public Works:

- Gen. Gheorghe Văleanu (13 March - 13 June 1920)
- Dimitrie Greceanu (13 June - 16 November 1920)
- Octavian Tăslăuanu (16 November 1920 - 1 January 1921)
- Ion Petrovici (1 January - 16 December 1921)

- Minister of Communications:

- Gen. Gheorghe Văleanu (13 June 1920 - 16 December 1921)

- Minister of Industry and Commerce:

- Octavian Tăslăuanu (13 March - 16 November 1920)
- Gen. Alexandru Averescu (16 November 1920 - 16 December 1921)
- (interim) Fotin Enescu (19 February - 4 March 1918)

- Minister of Religious Affairs and Public Instruction:

- Petre P. Negulescu (13 March - 13 June 1920)

- Minister of Public Instruction:

- Petre P. Negulescu (13 June 1920 - 16 December 1921)

- Minister of Religious Affairs and the Arts:

- Octavian Goga (13 June 1920 - 16 December 1921)

- Minister of Agriculture and Property:

- Theodor Cudalbu (13 March 1920 - 18 July 1921)

- Minister of Agriculture:

- Constantin Garoflid (22 July - 16 December 1921)

- Minister of Property:

- Theodor Cudalbu (18 July - 16 December 1921)

- Minister of Labour and Social Security:

- Grigore Trancu-Iași (30 March 1920 - 16 December 1921)

- Minister of State (Ministers without portfolio):

- Anton Mocsony (13 March - 1 November 1920)
- Ion Inculeț (13 March - 2 May 1920)
- Ion Nistor (13 March - 2 May 1920)
- Grigore Trancu-Iași (13 - 30 March 1920)
- Vasile Goldiș (18 - 19 March 1920), commissioned to oversee Transylvania
- Octavian Goga (18 March - 13 June 1920)
- Constantin Garoflid (3 April 1920 - 22 July 1921)
- Sergiu Niță (2 May 1920 - 16 December 1921)
- Ion V. Stârcea (2 May - 1 November 1920)
- Petru Groza (16 April - 16 December 1921)
- Dori Popovici (16 April - 16 December 1921)

Preceded by First Vaida-Voevod cabinet	Cabinet of Romania; 13 March 1920 - 16 December 1921	Succeeded by Ionescu cabinet
