= Ionescu cabinet =

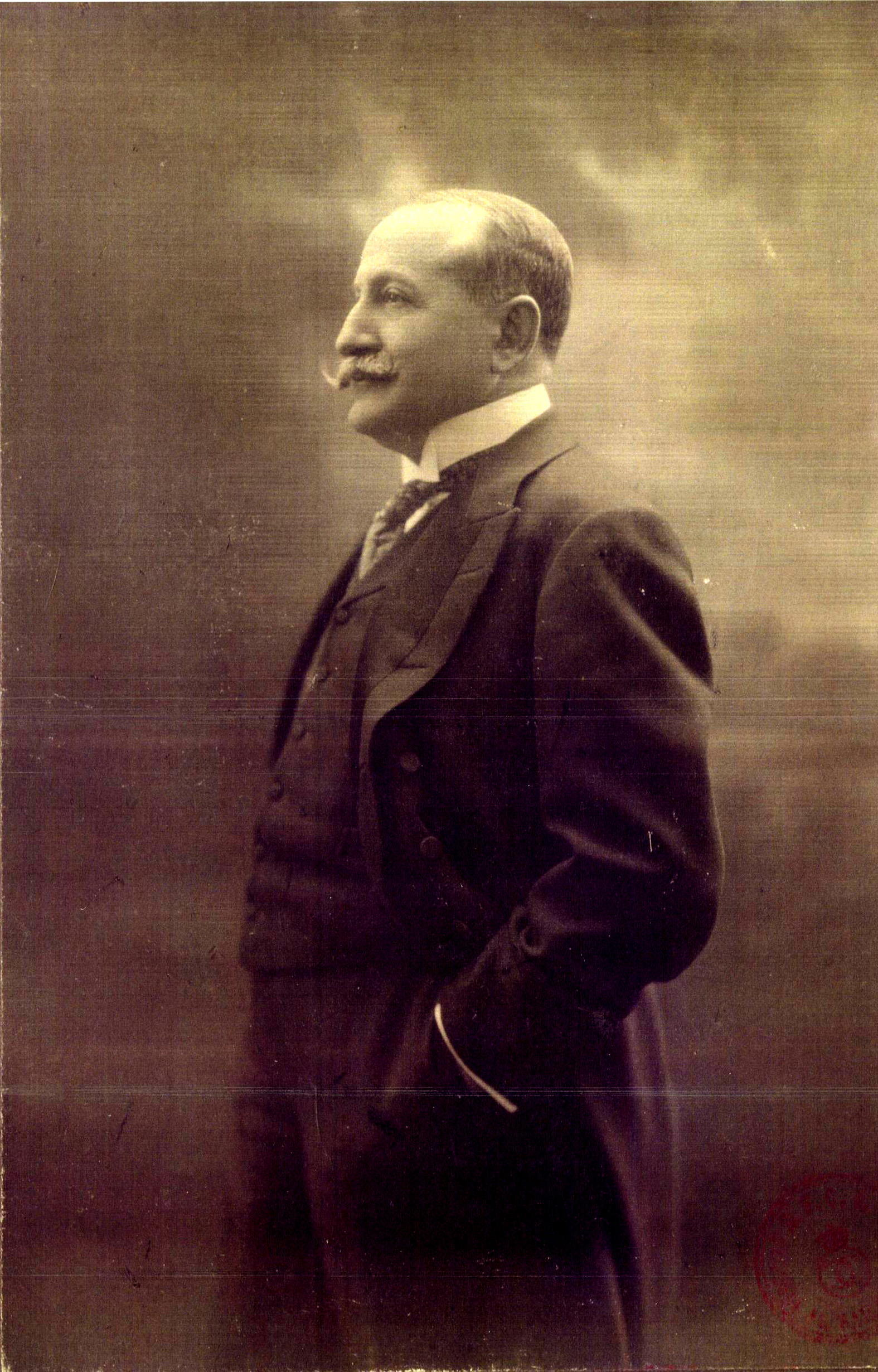
Take Ionescu

The cabinet of Take Ionescu was the government of Romania from 17 December 1921 to 19 January 1922.

== Composition ==
The ministers of the cabinet were as follows:

- President of the Council of Ministers:

- Take Ionescu (17 December 1921 - 19 January 1922)

- Minister of the Interior:

- Ion Cămărășescu (17 December 1921 - 19 January 1922)

- Minister of Foreign Affairs:

- Gheorghe Derussi (17 December 1921 - 19 January 1922)

- Minister of Finance:

- Take Ionescu (17 December 1921 - 19 January 1922)

- Minister of Justice:

- Stelian Popescu (17 December 1921 - 19 January 1922)

- Minister of War:

- Gen. Ștefan Holban (17 December 1921 - 19 January 1922)

- Minister of Public Works:

- Gheorghe Lucasievici (17 December 1921 - 19 January 1922)

- Minister of Communications:

- Constantin Cihodariu (17 December 1921 - 19 January 1922)

- Minister of Industry and Commerce:

- Mihail Oromolu (17 December 1921 - 2 January 1922)
- (interim) Gheorghe Lucasievici (2 - 19 January 1922)

- Minister of Public Instruction:

- George G. Mironescu (17 December 1921 - 19 January 1922)

- Minister of Religious Affairs and the Arts:

- Vasile Dumitrescu-Brăila (17 December 1921 - 19 January 1922)

- Minister of Agriculture:

- Dumitru Dumitrescu (17 December 1921 - 19 January 1922)

- Minister of Property:

- Mihail Vlădescu (17 December 1921 - 19 January 1922)

- Minister of Labour and Social Security:

- Constantin Xeni (17 December 1921 - 19 January 1922)

- Minister of State (without portfolio):

- Dimitrie Bogos (5 - 19 December 1922)

Preceded by Second Averescu cabinet	Cabinet of Romania; 17 December 1921 - 19 January 1922	Succeeded by Sixth Ion I. C. Brătianu cabinet
