= First Vaida-Voevod cabinet =

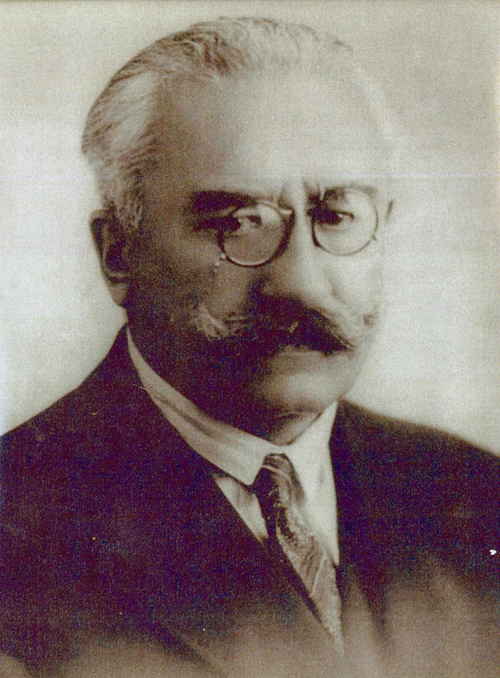
Alexandru Vaida-Voevod

The first cabinet of Alexandru Vaida-Voevod was the government of Romania from 1 December 1919 to 12 March 1920.

== Composition ==
The ministers of the cabinet were as follows:

- President of the Council of Ministers:

- Alexandru Vaida-Voevod (1 December 1919 - 12 March 1920)

- Minister of the Interior:

- Gen. Alexandru Averescu (5 - 16 December 1919)
- (interim) Aurel Vlad (16 - 27 December 1919)
- Nicolae Lupu (27 December 1919 - 12 March 1920)

- Minister of Foreign Affairs:

- Alexandru Vaida-Voevod (1 December 1919 - 12 March 1920)

- Minister of Finance:

- Aurel Vlad (5 December 1919 - 23 February 1920)
- (interim) Mihai Popovici (23 February - 12 March 1920)

- Minister of Justice:

- Ion Pelivan (5 December 1919 - 12 March 1920)

- Minister of Religious Affairs and Public Instruction:

- Octavian Goga (5 -16 December 1919)
- Ion Borcea (16 December 1919 - 12 March 1920)

- Minister of War:

- Gen. Ioan Rășcanu (5 December 1919 - 2 March 1920)
- Gen. Traian Moșoiu (2 - 12 March 1920)

- Minister of Agriculture and Property:

- Victor Bontescu (5 -16 December 1919)
- Ion Mihalache (16 December 1919 - 12 March 1920)

- Minister of Industry and Commerce:

- (interim) Aurel Vlad (5 - 16 December 1919)
- Victor Bontescu (16 December 1919 - 2 March 1920)
- (interim) Ion Borcea (2 - 12 March 1920)

- Minister of Public Works:

- Mihai Popovici (5 December 1919 - 12 March 1920)

- Minister of State:

- Ion Cantacuzino (5 December 1919 - 12 March 1920)

- Ministers of State (for Bessarabia):

- Ion Inculeț (5 December 1919 - 12 March 1920)
- Pantelimon Halippa (5 December 1919 - 12 March 1920)

- Minister of State (for Bukovina):

- Ion Nistor (5 December 1919 - 12 March 1920)

- Minister of State (for Transylvania):

- Ștefan Cicio Pop (5 December 1919 - 12 March 1920)

Preceded by Văitoianu cabinet	Cabinet of Romania; 1 December 1919 - 12 March 1920	Succeeded by Second Averescu cabinet
