= Fifth Ion I. C. Brătianu cabinet =

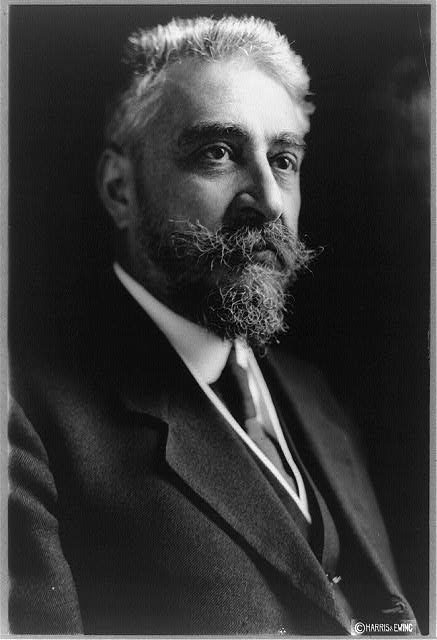
Ion I. C. Brătianu

The fifth cabinet of Ion I. C. Brătianu was the government of Romania from 29 November 1918 to 27 September 1919.

== Composition ==
The ministers of the cabinet were as follows:

- President of the Council of Ministers:

- Ion I. C. Brătianu (29 November 1918 - 27 September 1919)

- Minister of the Interior:

- George G. Mârzescu (29 November 1918 - 27 September 1919)

- Minister of Foreign Affairs:

- Ion I. C. Brătianu (29 November 1918 - 27 September 1919)

- Minister of Finance:

- Oscar Kiriacescu (29 November 1918 - 27 September 1919)

- Minister of Justice:

- Dumitru Buzdugan (29 November 1918 - 27 September 1919)

- Minister of Religious Affairs and Public Instruction:

- Ion G. Duca (29 November - 12 December 1918)
- Constantin Angelescu (12 December 1918 - 27 September 1919)

- Minister of War:

- Gen. Artur Văitoianu (29 November 1918 - 27 September 1919)

- Minister of Public Works:

- Anghel Saligny (29 November 1918 - 14 February 1919)
- (interim) Alexandru Constantinescu (14 February - 27 September 1919)

- Minister of Industry and Commerce:

- Alexandru Constantinescu (29 November 1918 - 27 September 1919)

- Minister of Agriculture and Property:

- Fotin Enescu (29 November - 3 December 1918)
- (interim) Alexandru Constantinescu (3 - 12 December 1918)
- Ion G. Duca (12 December 1918 - 27 September 1919)

- Ministers without portfolio:

- Mihail Pherekyde (29 November 1918 - 27 September 1919)

- Ministers without portfolio (for Bessarabia):

- Ion Inculeț (29 November 1918 - 27 September 1919)
- Daniel Ciugureanu (29 November 1918 - 27 September 1919)

- Ministers without portfolio (for Transylvania):

- Vasile Goldiș (29 November 1918 - 27 September 1919)
- Ștefan Cicio Pop (29 November 1918 - 27 September 1919)

- Ministers without portfolio (for Bukovina):

- Iancu Flondor (29 November 1918 - 15 April 1919)
- Ion Nistor (29 November 1918 - 27 September 1919)

Preceded by Coandă cabinet	Cabinet of Romania; 29 November 1918 - 27 September 1919	Succeeded by Văitoianu cabinet
