= Holban =

Holban is a Romanian surname. Notable people with the surname include:

- Anton Holban (1902–1937), Romanian novelist
- Boris Holban (1908–2004), Russian–born Franco–Romanian communist and political activist
- Ștefan Holban, various people
