= Gheorghe Văleanu =

Romanian major general and military commander

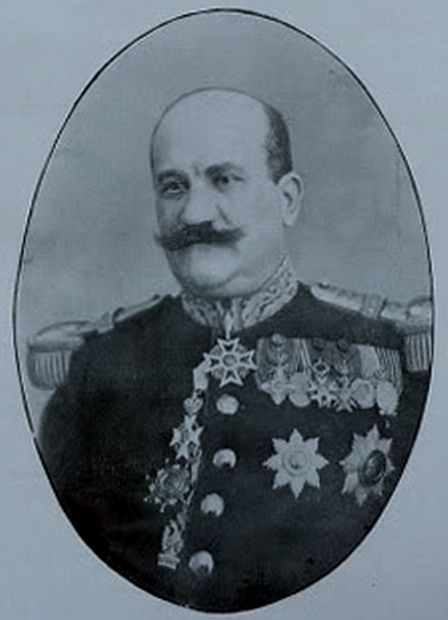
- Born: 12 February 1864; Slatina, Olt County, Romanian United Principalities
- Died: 12 January 1948 (aged 83); Bucharest, Romanian People's Republic
- Education: École Polytechnique; School of Applied Artillery; Higher War School
- Military career
- Allegiance: Kingdom of Romania
- Branch: Romanian Land Forces
- Service years: 1882—1918
- Rank: Major General
- Conflicts: Second Balkan War; World War I; Second Battle of Oituz; Battle of Mărăști; Third Battle of Oituz

Minister of Public Works
- In office March 13, 1920 – June 13, 1920
- Prime Minister: Alexandru Averescu
- Preceded by: Mihai Popovici
- Succeeded by: Dimitrie Greceanu

Minister of Communications
- In office June 13, 1920 – December 16, 1921
- Prime Minister: Alexandru Averescu
- Succeeded by: Constantin Cihodariu
- In office March 30, 1926 – June 4, 1927
- Prime Minister: Alexandru Averescu
- Preceded by: Artur Văitoianu
- Succeeded by: Constantin D. Dimitriu

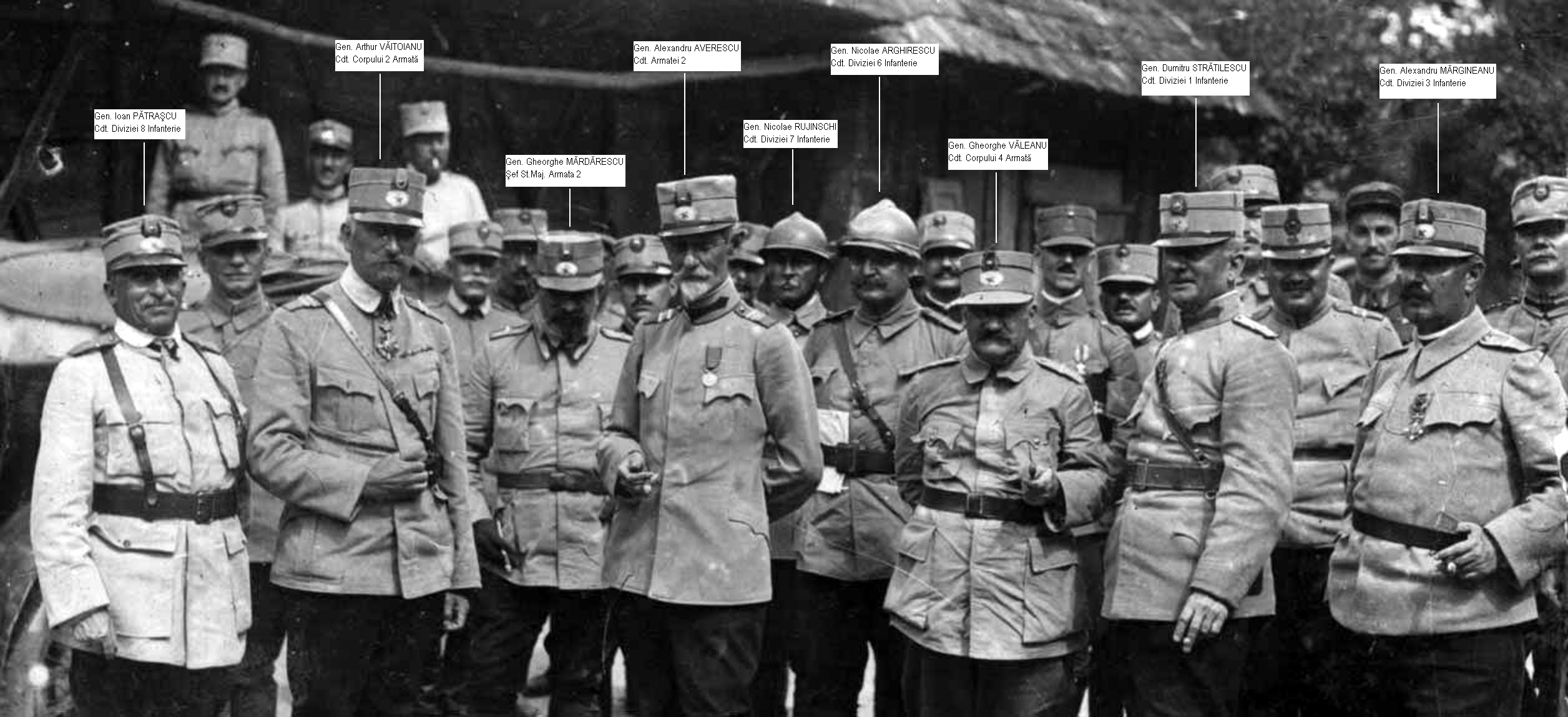
Văleanu (front center) with other commanding officers of the Romanian 2nd Army, 1917

Gheorghe Văleanu (February 12, 1864 – January 12, 1948) was a Romanian major general and military commander. During the First World War he commanded VI., IV. and II. corps and was notable in the Battle of Mărăști and the Third Battle of Oituz.

== Military career ==
Gheorghe Văleanu was born on February 12, 1864, in Slatina. He was the son of Costică and Maria Văleanu born Niculescu. After completing high school in Iași, he began his military training in 1882 by attending the Military School for Infantry and Cavalry in Bucharest, which he completed in 1884, graduating with the rank of second lieutenant. From 1884 he attended the École Polytechnique in Paris, and after that from 1888 to 1889 the School of Artillery and Engineering in Fontainebleau. He reached the rank of lieutenant in 1887 then promoted to the rank of captain in 1890, and promoted to the rank of major in 1895.

From 1895 to 1899 Văleanu taught at the National School of Bridges and Roads. He attended the Higher War School in Bucharest and graduated from it in 1899. In 1901 he was promoted to the rank of lieutenant colonel, and he taught at the Higher War School from 1902 to 1906. He reached the rank of colonel in 1907, and was promoted to the rank of brigadier general in 1912, after which in 1914 he became commander of the 2nd Division. In 1916 he was appointed commander of the fortified city of Bucharest.

== World War I ==
After Romania entered the war on the side of the Entente, Văleanu was appointed commander of the VI. corps. The corps, which consisted of the 16th and 18th Divisions, was part of the 3rd Army under the command of Mihail Aslan, and held positions south of Bucharest. Văleanu commanded the Sixth Corps until September 27, 1916, when the corps was disbanded.

On June 11, 1917, Văleanu was appointed commander of the IV. corps of the 2nd Army. While commanding the IV. corps, he participated in the Battle of Mărăști, after which he was promoted to the rank of divisional general. He commanded the Fourth Corps until August 1, 1917, when he took command of the II. corps replacing the command with Artur Văitoianu who in turn became commander of the IV. corps. After taking command of II. Corps, Văleanu, commanding them, took part in the Third Battle of Oituz. He commanded the Second Corps until February 5, 1918, after which he resigned from the Army.

== Political career ==
In April 1918 he joined General Alexandru Averescu's People's Party. In 1920 he was elected to the Chamber of Deputies and later to the Senate. Văleanu served as Minister of Public Works (March 13 to June 13, 1920) and Minister of Communications (June 13, 1920, to December 16, 1921) in the Second Averescu cabinet, and again as Minister of Communications in the Third Averescu cabinet (March 30, 1926, to June 4, 1927). He died on January 12, 1948, in Bucharest.
