= Ștefan Holban =

Ștefan Holban may refer to:

- Ștefan Holban (general) (1869–1939), Romanian general and politician
- Ștefan Holban (politician) (1886–1961), Russian-born Romanian politician, member of the Sfatul Țării
