= Third Averescu cabinet =

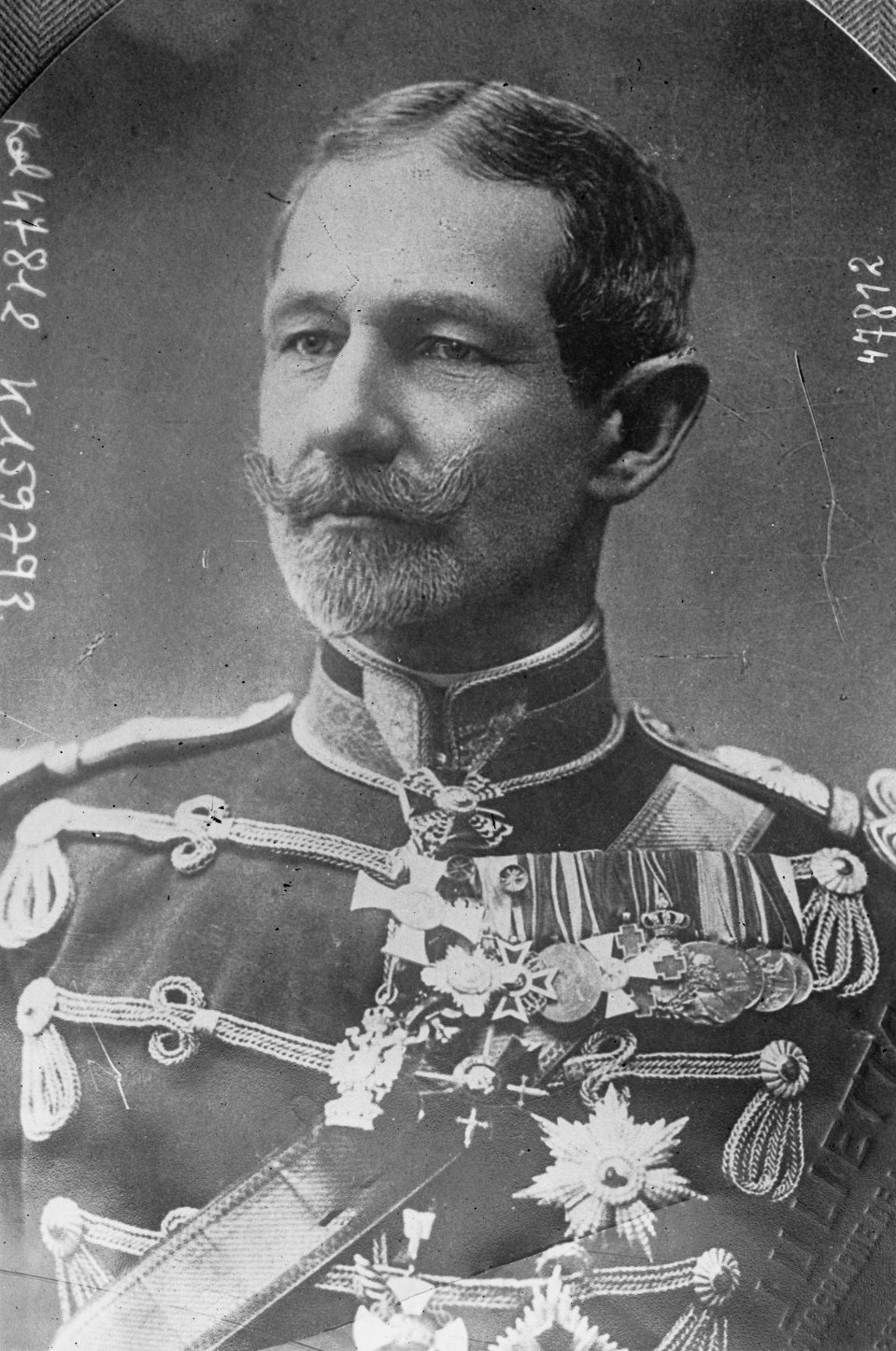
Alexandru Averescu

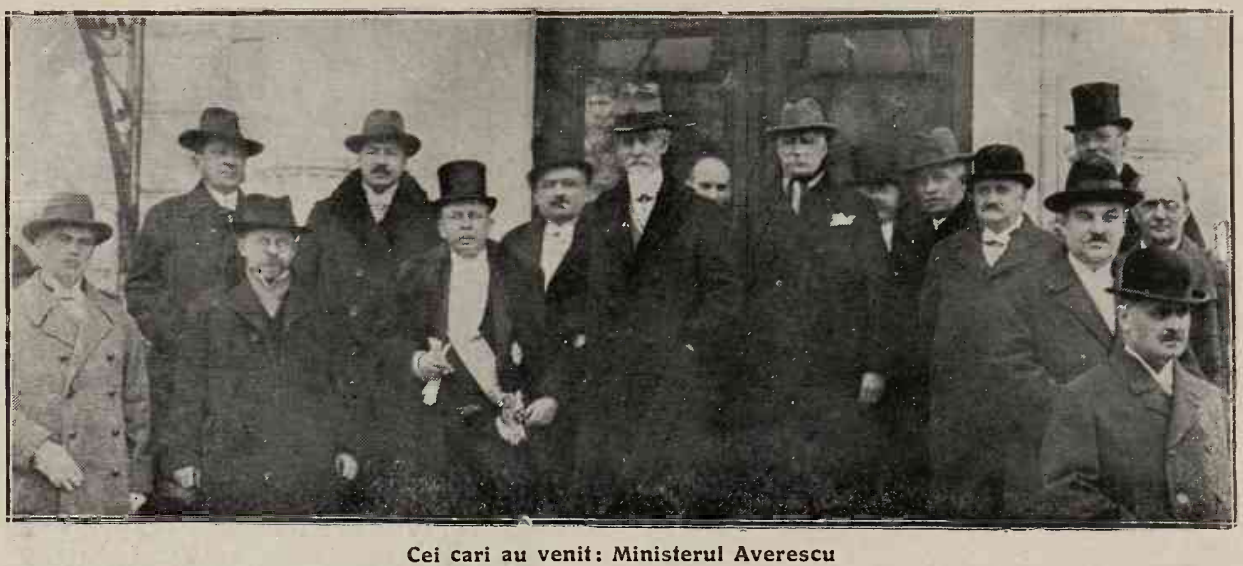
Investiture of the third Averescu cabinet.

The third cabinet of Alexandru Averescu was the government of Romania from 30 March 1926 to 4 June 1927.

== Composition ==
The ministers of the cabinet were as follows:

- President of the Council of Ministers:

- Gen. Alexandru Averescu (30 March 1926 - 4 June 1927)

- Minister of the Interior:

- Octavian Goga (30 March 1926 - 4 June 1927)

- Minister of Foreign Affairs:

- Ion Mitilineu (30 March 1926 - 4 June 1927)

- Minister of Finance:

- Ion Lapedatu (30 March 1926 - 19 March 1927)
- Gen. Alexandru Averescu (19 March - 4 June 1927)

- Minister of Justice:

- Theodor Cudalbu (30 March 1926 - 4 June 1927)

- Minister of War:

- Gen. Ludovic Mircescu (30 March 1926 - 4 June 1927)

- Minister of Public Works:

- Petru Groza (30 March - 14 July 1926)
- Constantin Meissner (14 July 1926 - 4 June 1927)

- Minister of Communications:

- Gen. Gheorghe Văleanu (30 March 1926 - 4 June 1927)

- Minister of Industry and Commerce:

- Gen. Constantin Coandă (30 March - 14 July 1926)
- Mihail Berlescu (14 July 1926 - 4 June 1927)

- Minister of Public Instruction:

- Petre P. Negulescu (30 March - 14 July 1926)
- Ion Petrovici (14 July 1926 - 4 June 1927)

- Minister of Religious Affairs and the Arts:

- Vasile Goldiș (30 March 1926 - 4 June 1927)

- Minister of Agriculture and Property:

- Constantin Garoflid (30 March 1926 - 4 June 1927)

- Ministry of Labour, Social Insurance and Cooperation:

- Grigore Trancu-Iași (30 March 1926 - 4 June 1927)

- Minister of Public Health and Social Welfare:

- Ioan Lupaș (30 March 1926 - 4 June 1927)

- Minister of State (Ministers without portfolio):

- Sergiu Niță (30 March 1926 - 4 June 1927)
- Dori Popovici (30 March 1926 - 4 June 1927)
- Ion Petrovici (30 March - 14 July 1926)
- Petru Groza (30 March 1926 - 4 June 1927)
- Gen. Constantin Coandă (10 August - 14 November 1926), also in charge of the interim presidency of the Council of Ministers
- Gen. Ioan Rășcanu (5 January - 4 June 1927), also High Commissioner of Bessarabia and Bukovina

Preceded by Sixth Ion I. C. Brătianu cabinet	Cabinet of Romania; 30 March 1926 - 4 June 1927	Succeeded by Știrbei cabinet
