= Monument to the Heroes of the Engineer Arm =

Monument to the Heroes of the Military Engineers' Army
- Romania
- For The military engineers who fought in the Romanian Army during World War I
- Unveiled: June 1929
- Location: 44°26′3.25″N 26°3′31.46″E; Bucharest, Romania
- Designed by: Spiridon Georgescu
- Spuneți generațiilor viitoare că noi am făcut suprema jertfă pe câmpurile de bătaie pentru întregirea neamului

The Monument to the Heroes of the Engineer Arm (Romanian: Monumentul Eroilor din Arma Geniului; often called Leul - "the Lion") in Bucharest, Romania is dedicated to the heroism and sacrifice of the military engineers who fought in the Romanian Army during World War I, of whom nearly a thousand were killed in action and many more wounded.

Unveiled in June 1929, it is located at the intersection of Bulevardul Geniului and Bulevardul Iuliu Maniu, across the street from Cotroceni Palace. One of Bucharest's most recognisable monuments, it was financed entirely through donations from veteran officers of the Engineer Arm and executed by Spiridon Georgescu.

Set into the pyramidal base are bronze reliefs depicting the engineers in action. Four life-sized bronze statues represent troops from the Engineer Arm — a sapper, a pontoon bridge builder, a Signal Corps engineer and a Căile Ferate Române soldier.

But the monument's chief component is a statue of a lion, which stands atop the pedestal. With his front paws he tramples upon the barrel of a cannon (upon which sits a Pickelhaube); a flag flows downward. The lion symbolises the endurance, daring, and bravery shown by Romanian troops between 1916 and 1918, especially at the dramatic battles during the summer of 1917 — Mărăști, Oituz, and Mărășești.

Carved into the pedestal in relief is the inscription, "Spuneți generațiilor viitoare că noi am făcut suprema jertfă pe câmpurile de bătaie pentru întregirea neamului" - "Tell succeeding generations that we made the supreme sacrifice on the fields of battle for the union of the people". A medallion on the steps at the bottom reads, "EROILOR DIN ARMA GENIULUI 1916–1919" — "To the heroes of the Engineer Arm 1916–1919".
