= Sighet Prison =

Former prison in Sighetu Marmației, Romania

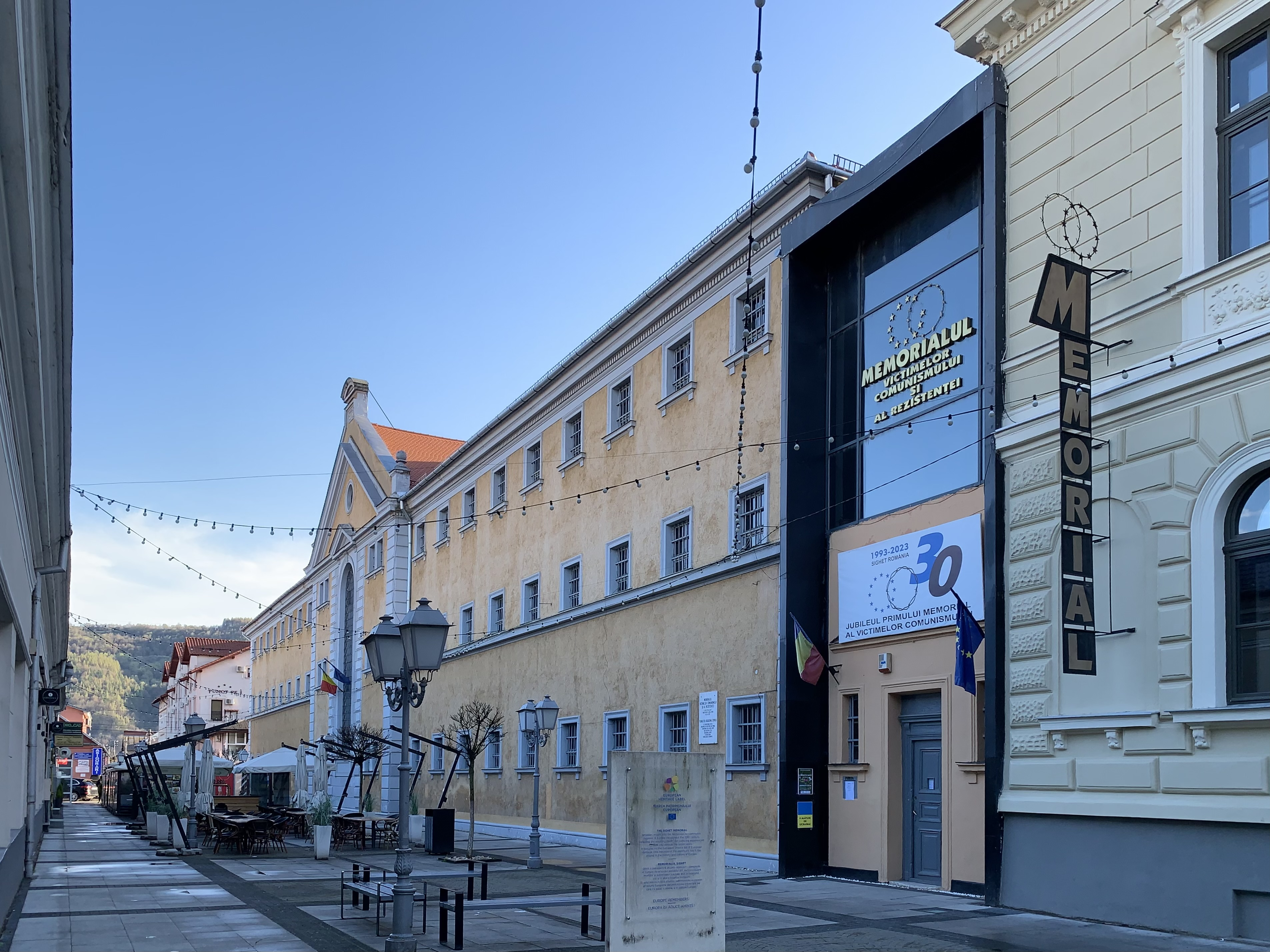
- The former prison in 2023, currently houses the Sighet Memorial Museum
- Interactive map of Sighet Prison
- Location: Sighetu Marmației, Romania; 47°55′37″N 23°53′27″E
- Status: Closed, listed as historic monument
- Population: Political prisoners (from 1948 to closure)
- Opened: 1897
- Closed: 1977
- Director: Vasile Ciolpan (1950–1955)
- Website: www.memorialsighet.ro

The Sighet Prison, located in the city of Sighetu Marmației, Maramureș County, Romania, was used by Romania to hold criminals, prisoners of war, and political prisoners. It is now the site of the Sighet Memorial Museum, part of the Memorial of the Victims of Communism.

== History ==
=== Beginnings ===
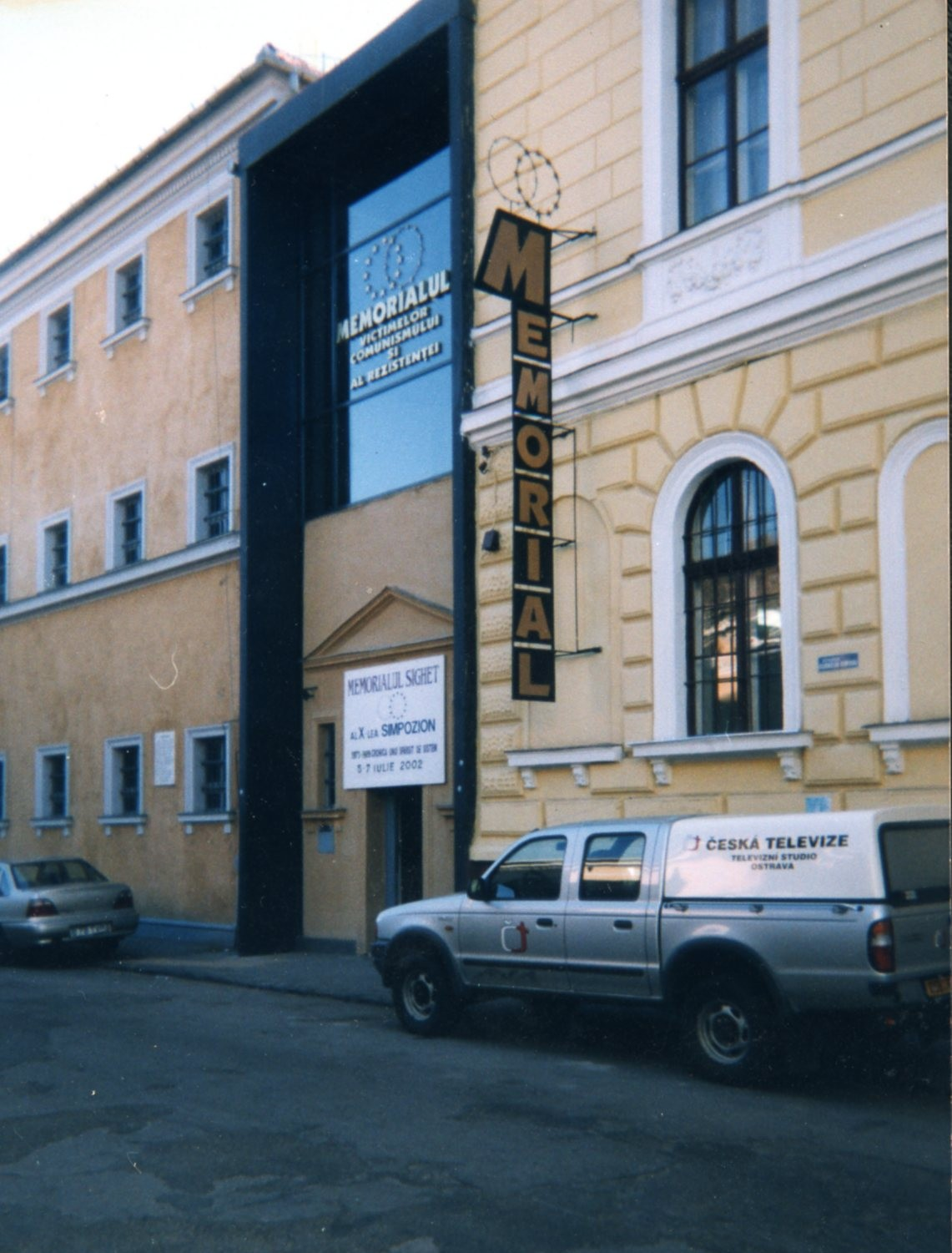
The Sighet Memorial Museum.

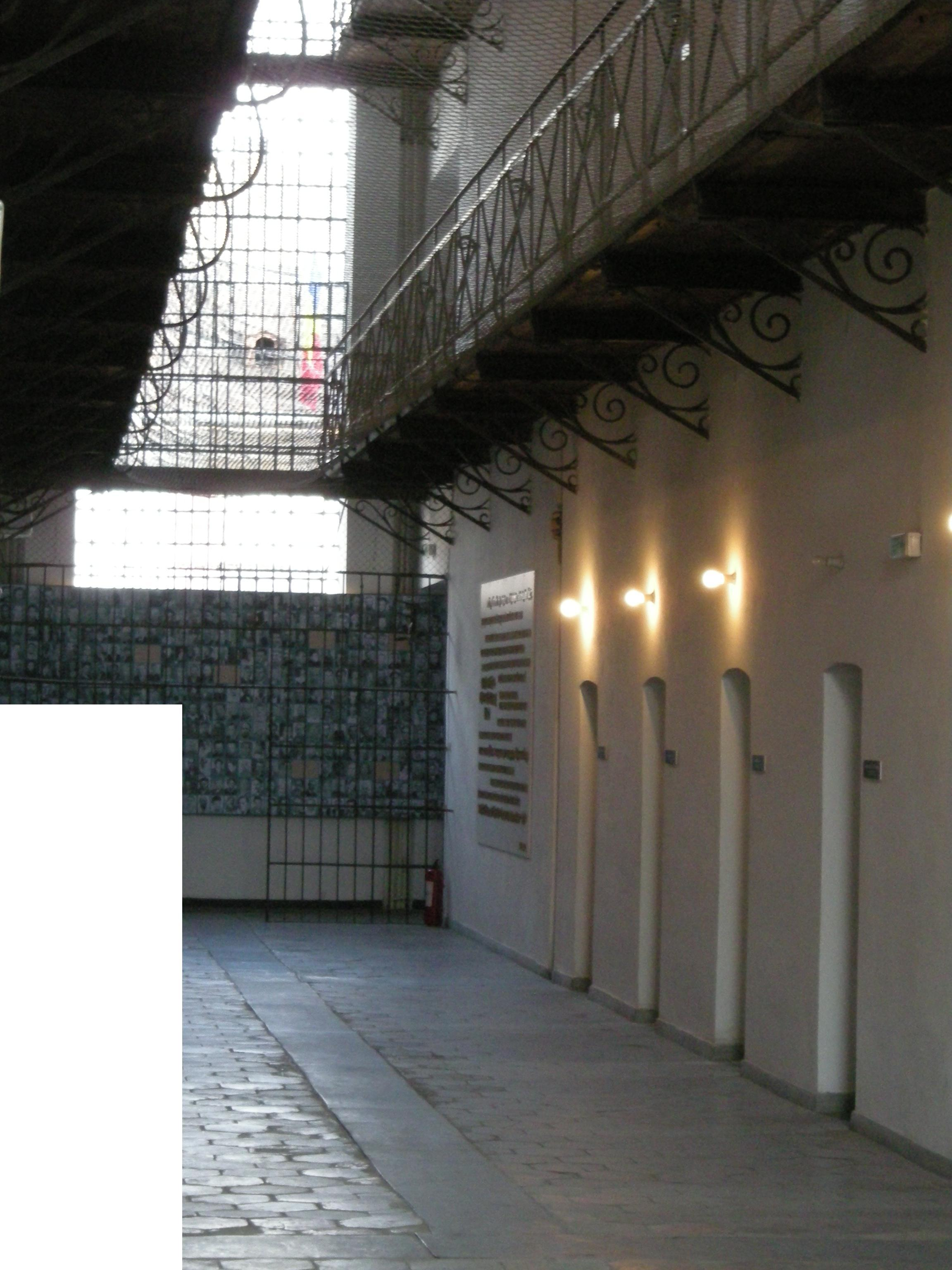
Sighet Memorial Museum, interior with cell doors.

The prison was built in 1896–1897 by the authorities of the Kingdom of Hungary. Following Austrian practice, it was situated close to the courthouse in order to facilitate prisoner transport. From its opening until 1944, it housed common criminals with sentences of six months to two years. T-shaped, the building had a ground and two upper floors. Of the 108 cells, 36 were individual and the rest fit four or six people. It was built of brick and reinforced concrete, with doors of fir wood. The thick walls were some six meters high and topped by guard towers.

While Northern Transylvania was under Soviet military administration from November 1944 to March 1945, the building was used for interning Soviet deserters and delinquents, subsequently returned to the Soviet Union. After the end of World War II, ethnic German war prisoners passed through Sighet, some on their way to forced labor in the Soviet Union, others returning home from there. Between 1947 and 1950, common criminals formed the majority of detainees. However, political prisoners began to appear: peasants from the surrounding Maramureș region who refused to hand over food quotas to the state, and local youth who had been active in the Iron Guardist Frățiile de Cruce associations. From the latter category, among the earliest arrivals were eighteen pupils from Dragoș Vodă High School, accused of demonstrating against the new communist regime; they were incarcerated in August 1948 and kept until May 1949, after which they were tried in Cluj and sent to prisons in Pitești, Gherla, and Târgșor, or to the Danube–Black Sea Canal.

=== Elite extermination ===
On the night of May 5/6, 1950, a Securitate secret police operation led to the arrest of some 80 high-ranking politicians from the 1918–1945 period, largely from the National Peasants' Party and the National Liberal Party. The operation involved 228 agents acting in 38 teams of six. After a brief stay at the Interior Ministry in Bucharest, they were taken to Sighet in vans, arriving on May 7. It is believed that the prison was chosen for its geographic isolation and proximity to the Soviet Union; in the event of an anti-communist revolt, the prisoners could be whisked across the border. Another advantage was its division into cells, facilitating isolation. On May 26, the group of Romanian Greek-Catholic bishops and priests arrested in October 1948, previously held at Dragoslavele and Căldărușani Monastery, arrived. In August 1951, they were joined from Galați by the prisoners sentenced at the Maniu–Mihalache trial. Other imprisoned politicians and Greek-Catholic clerics arrived until 1952; detainees at Sighet numbered 89 by that August. Only the Maniu–Mihalache prisoners were at Sighet following a public trial, held in November 1947. The rest were there on orders from the Interior Ministry or the Securitate; no charges were filed, and their status was that of temporary pre-trial arrest. At least 53 detainees died at Sighet between 1950 and 1955. They were buried at night by common criminals in the city cemetery or on the hospital grounds in graves that remain anonymous. The deaths were recorded in a report signed by the doctor and warden; no death certificates were issued. Coffins were used in 1950–1951, then stopped being used due to a lack of wood. Interior Ministry officials gave orders that strict secrecy be preserved as to the individual gravesites. Death certificates were finally issued in 1957 and placed in the detainees’ personal files. They were not sent to the families, who were notified on a case-by-case basis.

Prisoners were awakened at five in the morning and had to be in their cells at eight in the evening. Lights were turned off at night in multi-prisoner cells but left on in single cells, in order to enhance surveillance. The prisoners were under constant watch, each cell visited every ten minutes, day and night; guards wore noiseless shoes so their approach would not be heard. Inspections were carried out at least three times a month, generally towards midnight. Prisoners would be rousted from bed with insults and blows, the entire guard corps carrying out a minute search. Prisoners performed menial tasks: peeling potatoes, washing clothes, chopping wood, sweeping. Some of these, such as washing apples or cleaning bathrooms, were done for their humiliation and for the guards’ amusement.

Once or twice a week, a prisoner was allowed a ten-minute walk in one of the two courtyards. Hands behind his back and head down, so as not to be recognized by other inmates, any violation was punished by solitary confinement. The cell used for this purpose had no windows or light, and rations were reduced by half. The cold, hungry prisoner, if not chained, had to stand all day. Prisoners not in solitary also spent most of the day in their cells, the door locked, forbidden from looking out the window. When taken out in the morning, they remained silent, not allowed to know their neighbors. Memoirists agree that the greatest torture at Sighet was hunger, which began to grip them days after arrival. Rations never exceeded 1,300 calories per day, sometimes falling below 700. This extermination regime often gave rise to serious illnesses. Food included bread, boiled corn flour, beans, cabbage with occasional bits of meat and, for most of the first three years as a main meal, pearl barley. In the summer of 1953, the food began to improve as milk and more meat appeared. However, the warden and guards habitually stole these two items, as well as sour cream, smoked bones and vegetables. A report noted that the warden would daily bring home three or four buckets full of food for his pigs. The warden was lieutenant Vasile Ciolpan, who held the position from May 1, 1950 until August 31, 1955, when he was dismissed for cause.

When the detainees arrived in May 1950, the prison was in poor condition; repairs lasted until the following spring. Cold was a problem the first winter: the stoves did not burn properly, and the warden stole, both for making furniture and for burning in his own house. The cells stopped being heated at all from March 1954. Medical care was practically absent. Weekly doctor’s visits were perfunctory, perhaps resulting in the distribution of a few aspirins. Terminally ill inmates were isolated on the ground floor, left to die alone. The most common diseases were rapid weight loss, ulcers and liver, heart, kidney problems. They were caused by malnutrition and old age. The conditions also caused mental illnesses such as psychosis, delirium and insomnia. Isolation was severe. Besides the warden and his superiors, no one knew the detainees’ whereabouts. The only news came from new arrivals or pilfering guards’ newspapers. No correspondence was permitted. Circulation was restricted on the streets around the prison: from some distance away, signs warned people away, and the sidewalk was patrolled by armed guards.

=== Aftermath ===
In July 1955, the political prisoners were moved out of Sighet. Some were freed and allowed to return to their families, although to other homes, since their property had been confiscated. Others were forced to live on the Bărăgan Plain. A third category, numbering around 60, were sent to other prisons, especially Râmnicu Sărat. A new set of prisoners arrived from Făgăraș, Galați and Suceava. These were common criminals sentenced to life imprisonment, henceforth its main occupants. Their recalcitrant behavior, including an uprising and a joint escape by five, caused problems for the rest of the year. Occasionally, political prisoners, not part of the former elite, were held at Sighet for very short periods. The prison was closed in August 1977. The building was turned into a depot run by the town hall, and slowly fell into disrepair.

In the aftermath of the Romanian Revolution of 1989, that saw the dismantlement of the communist regime, poet Ana Blandiana presented in January 1993 to the Council of Europe a project to transform the former prison into a museum, called the "Memorial to the Victims of Communism and Resistance." On June 20, 1997, the first halls were opened and a prayer and silence space was inaugurated in the small prison courtyard, meant as a tribute to all political prisoners who died in detention in Communist Romania. The larger courtyard features the statuary group called "Sacrifice Parade," made by the sculptor Aurel Vlad.

== Inmates ==
=== Died ===
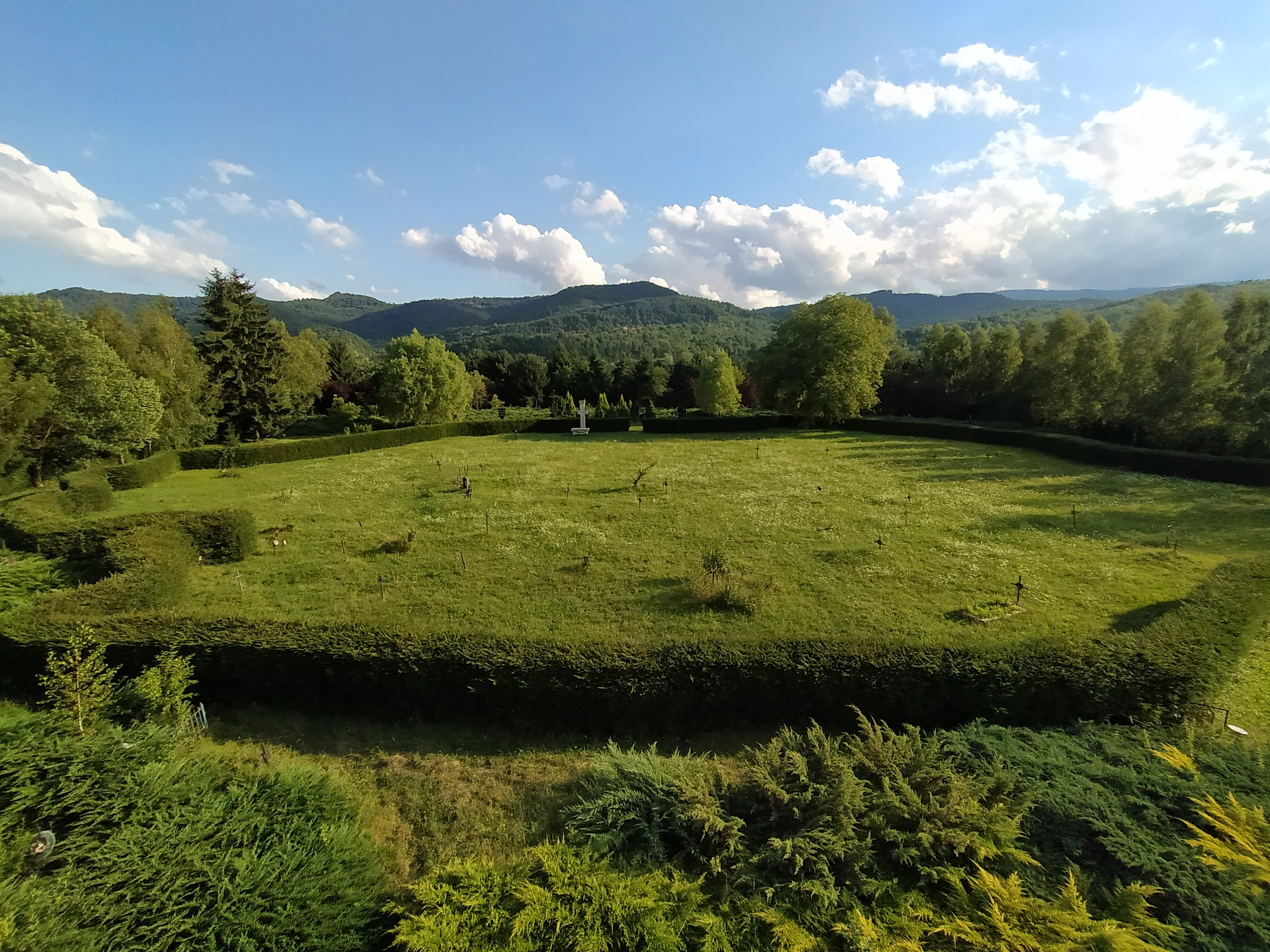
Paupers Cemetery in Sighetu Marmației, where many of the inmates who died in custody were buried

- Constantin Argetoianu, senator and prime minister
- Aurel Baciu, lawyer
- Victor Bădulescu, economist
- Sever Bocu, minister
- Aloisiu Boga, cleric
- Sebastian Bornemisa, deputy and minister
- Dinu Brătianu, deputy, senator, minister, party leader
- Gheorghe I. Brătianu, historian and politician
- Dumitru Tilică Burileanu, national bank governor
- Ion Cămărășescu, deputy and minister
- Henri Cihoski, general and minister
- Daniel Ciugureanu, deputy and minister
- Tancred Constantinescu, deputy, senator and minister
- Tit Liviu Chinezu, bishop
- Ioan Cristiu, minister
- Grigore Dimitrescu, national bank governor
- Anton Durcovici, bishop
- Valeriu Traian Frențiu, bishop
- Grigore Georgescu, general
- Stan Ghițescu, minister
- Alexandru Glatz, general
- Ion V. Gruia, jurist, minister
- Alexandru Lapedatu, historian
- Ion Macovei, minister
- Iuliu Maniu, deputy, party leader, prime minister
- Mihail Manoilescu, minister
- Ion Manolescu-Strunga, minister
- Nicolae Mareș, minister
- Mihail Măgureanu, lawyer
- Dumitru Munteanu-Râmnic, deputy and senator
- Nicolae Păiș, naval officer
- Ion Pelivan, diplomat and minister
- Ion Pop Ienci, lawyer
- Albert Popovici Tașcă, deputy
- Dorimedont Popovici, minister
- Ioan Popovici, general
- Radu Portocală, deputy, senator
- Virgil Potârcă, deputy, senator, minister
- Ioan Mihail Racoviță, general, minister
- Mihail Racoviță-Cehanu, general
- Ioan Rășcanu, general, deputy, minister
- Radu Roșculeț, minister
- Nicolae Samsonovici, general
- Ion Sandu, theologian
- Constantin Simian, deputy
- Ioan Suciu, bishop
- Gheorghe Tașcă, diplomat, minister
- Constantin Tătăranu, national bank governor
- Alexandru Tătărescu, general
- Gheorghe Vasiliu, general
- Aurel Vlad, deputy, minister
- Anton Zwiedinek, general

=== Survived ===
- Ioan Bălan, bishop
- Petre Bejan, engineer, politician
- Radu Budișteanu, lawyer, minister
- Nicolae Carandino, journalist
- Corneliu Coposu, secretary to Maniu
- Ioan Dragomir, bishop
- Silviu Dragomir, historian
- Constantin C. Giurescu, historian, minister
- Pan Halippa, president of Sfatul Țării
- Emil Hațieganu, minister
- Iuliu Hossu, bishop
- Ilie Lazăr, party leader
- Gheorghe N. Leon, economist, minister
- Ioan Lupaș, historian, minister
- Nicolae Marinescu, general, minister
- Ștefan Meteș, priest, historian
- Ion Mihalache, minister, party leader
- Iuliu Moldovan, physician, academic
- Ion Nistor, historian, minister
- Nicolae Penescu, lawyer, minister
- Constantin Titel Petrescu, party leader
- Ioan Ploscaru, bishop
- Mihail Priboianu, engineer, minister
- Alexander Ratiu, author, priest
- Alexandru Rusu, bishop
- Ioan Gheorghe Savin, theologian
- Joseph Schubert, bishop
- Virgil Solomon, physician, minister
- Gheorghe Tătărescu, party leader, prime minister
- Alexandru Todea, bishop

== Gallery ==
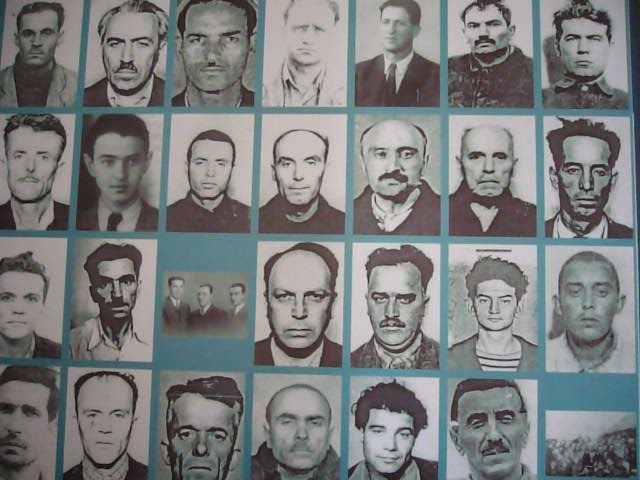
Former inmates

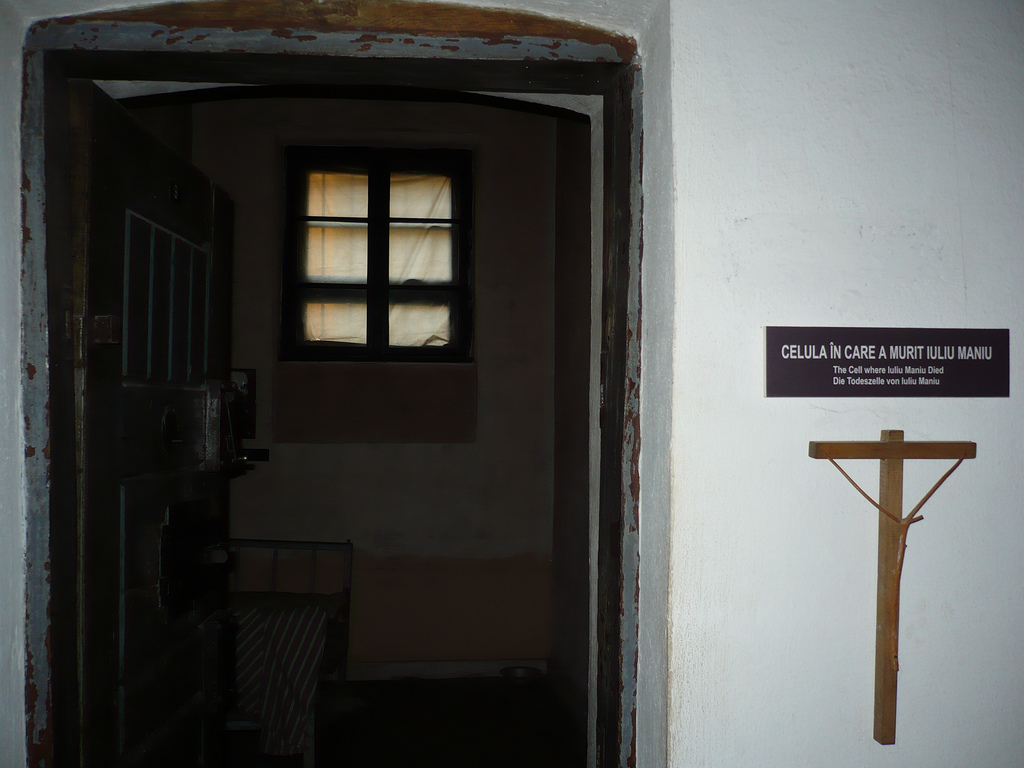
The cell in which Iuliu Maniu died

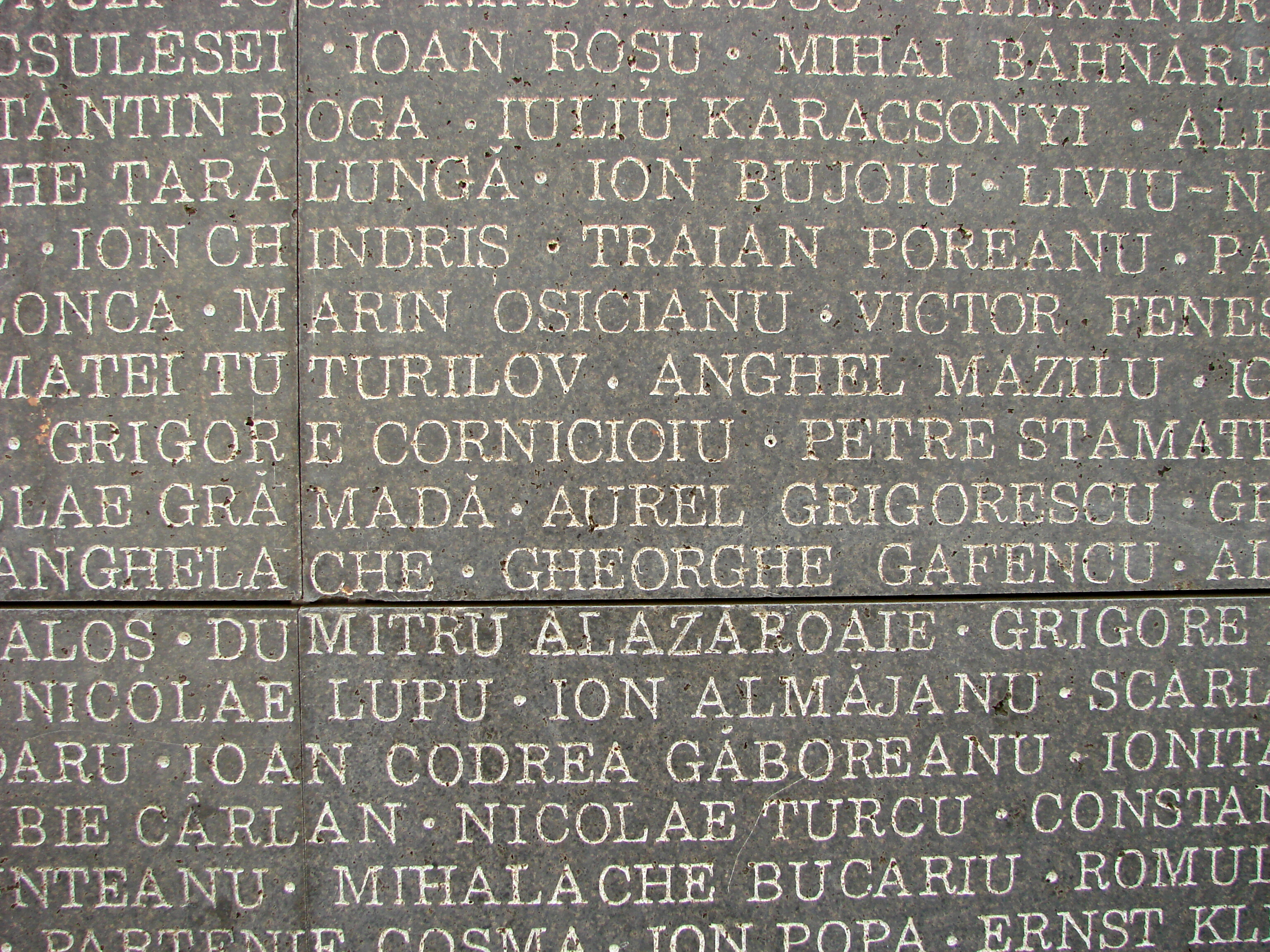
Names of the victims written on the walls

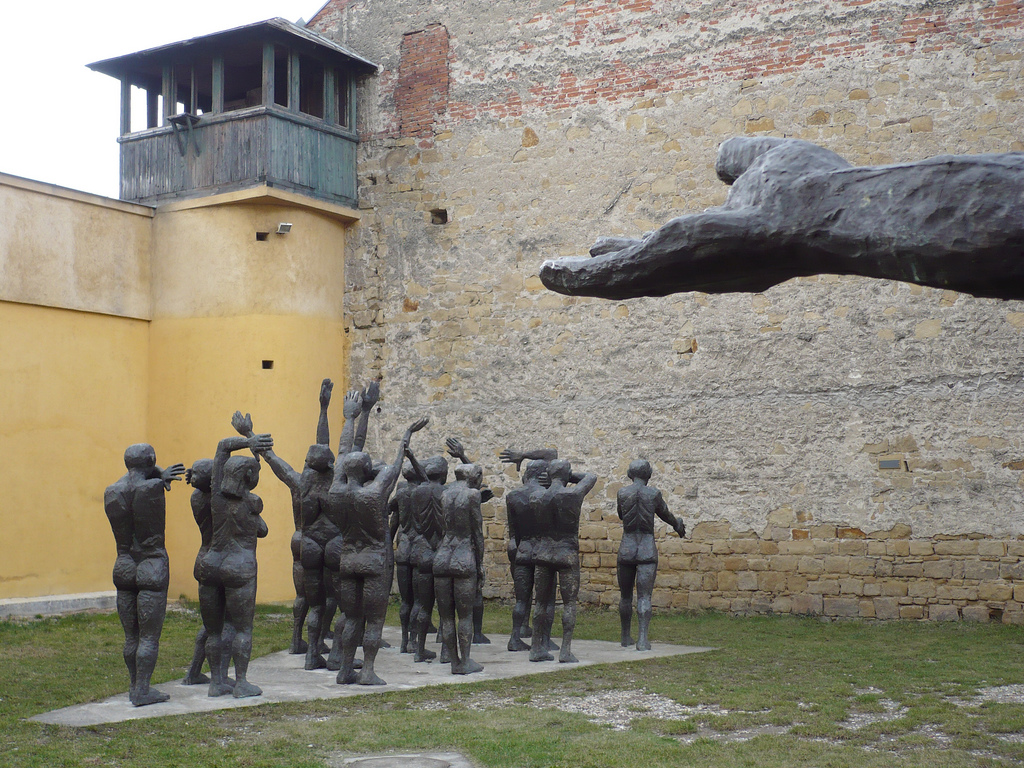
The statuary group "Procession of the Sacrificed", made by Aurel Vlad

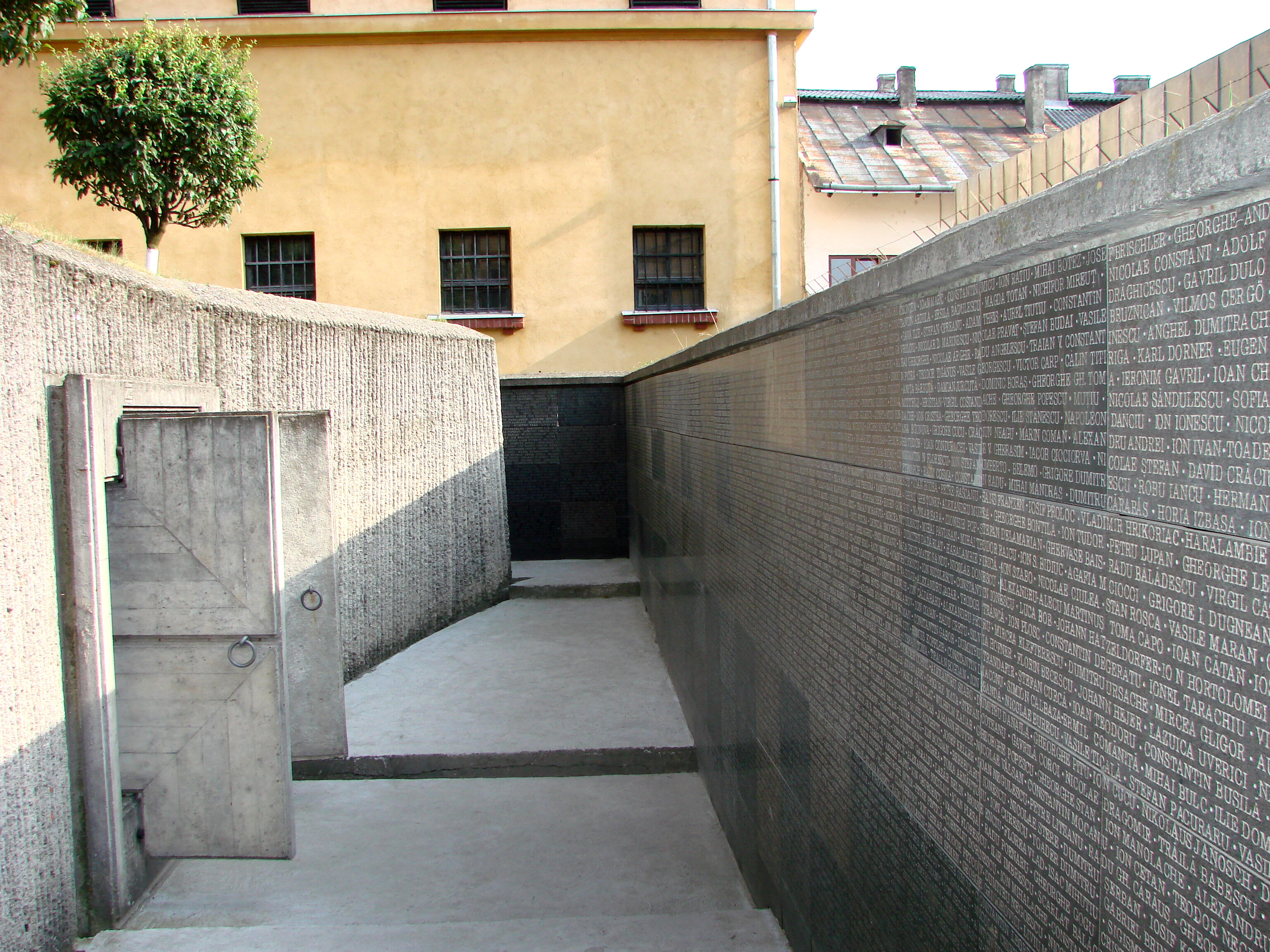
Memorial Wall at the Museum of Arrested Thought
