= Tancred Constantinescu =

Romanian engineer and politician

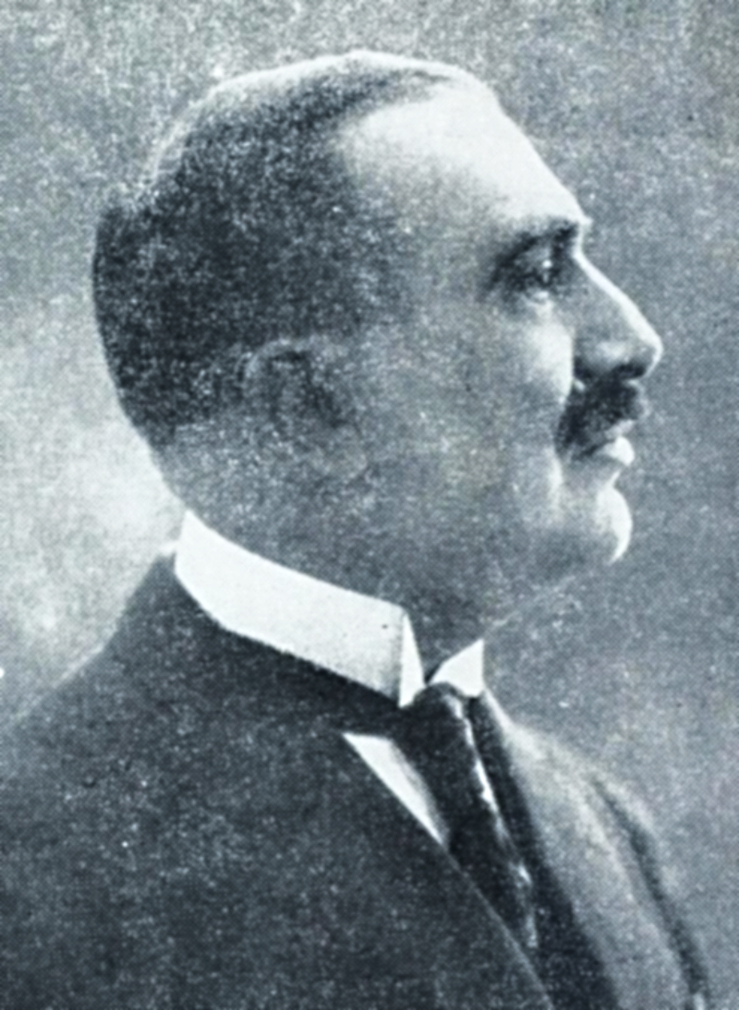
Tancred Constantinescu

Tancred Constantinescu (18 May 1878 – 14 January 1951) was a Romanian engineer and politician.

He was born on 18 May 1876 in Cahul, at the time in Moldavia, Romanian Principalities, now in the Republic of Moldova. He studied civil engineering at the School of Bridges and Roads in Bucharest, and then continued his studies in France and Germany. In 1916–1918, during World War I, he was Director of munitions procurement, and made important contributions to the development of the artillery pieces used by the Romanian Army at the battles of Mărășești and Mărăști. After the war, he became Director of Căile Ferate Române in 1922.

Constantinescu was a member of the National Liberal Party, a deputy, and a Senator. Between 30 October 1923, and 29 March 1926, he served as Minister of Industry in Ion I.C. Brătianu's 6th cabinet.

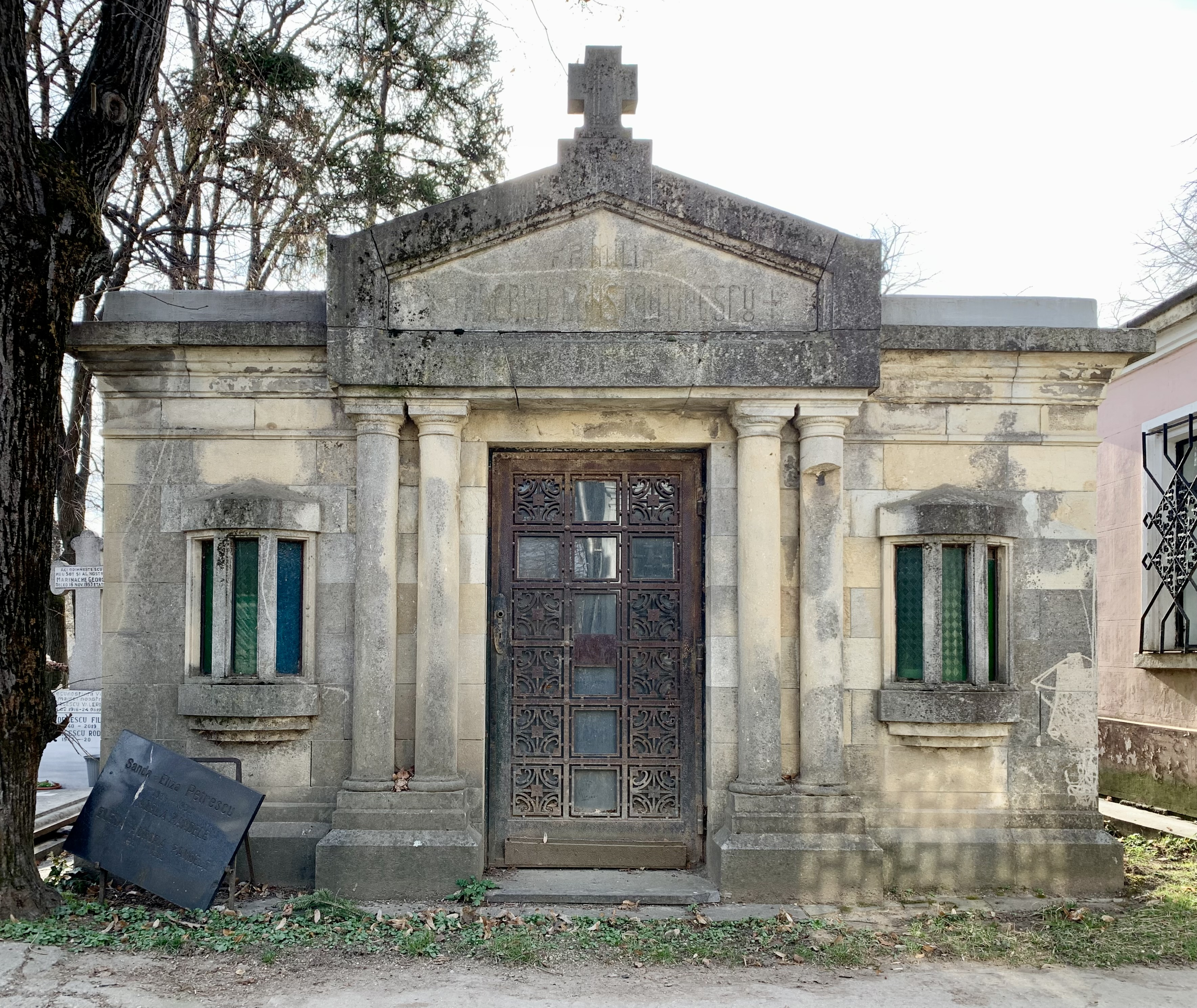
Grave of the Tancred Constantinescu family at Bellu Cemetery, Bucharest

He was arrested in May 1950 by the Communist authorities and sent to Sighet Prison, where he died on 14 January 1951.
