= Daciad =

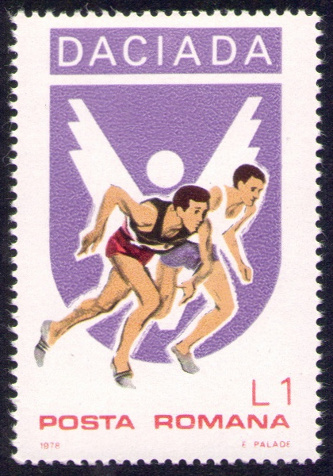
1978 stamp promoting the Daciad

The Daciad (Romanian: Daciada) was a multi-sport competition held every two years in the Socialist Republic of Romania meant to encourage mass participation in amateur sports. Only six editions were held, the first being held in 1977–1978, when 6 million people participated (of which 2,000 were selected to participate in professional sports). The last Daciad was the Winter Daciad of 1989; it was disbanded after the Romanian Revolution.

== History ==
Created at the initiative of president Nicolae Ceaușescu, the name refers to the ancient province of Dacia, being part of the nationalist ideology promoted by the state in the 1970s and 1980s (see National Communism in Romania).

The competitions were organized starting 1977 in all companies, schools, universities, military units, communes, cities and counties, in two editions: summer (March–October) and winter (November–February), with finals every two years. The Daciad promoted sports at a school level and the organization of competitions for all age categories, which encouraged school-children to practice sports and become part of the selection pool for various sports.

Under the name of the Daciad, the state built gyms, sport venues, as well as company and county-level clubs. Even today, many of the sport venues and sports complexes in use in Romania date from that period.

A number of Romanian champions and Olympic medal winners, including Nicu Vlad, Traian Cihărean (weightlifting), Maricica Puică, Ella Kovacs, Alina Astafei, Paula Ivan (athletes), Sanda Toma (canoe), and Vasile Pușcașu (judo) first competed and were discovered during the Daciads.

In 2013, Minister of Youth and Sports Nicolae Bănicioiu announced that he intends to revive the Daciad to encourage young people to practice sports.
