= Ștefan Holban (general) =

Romanian general

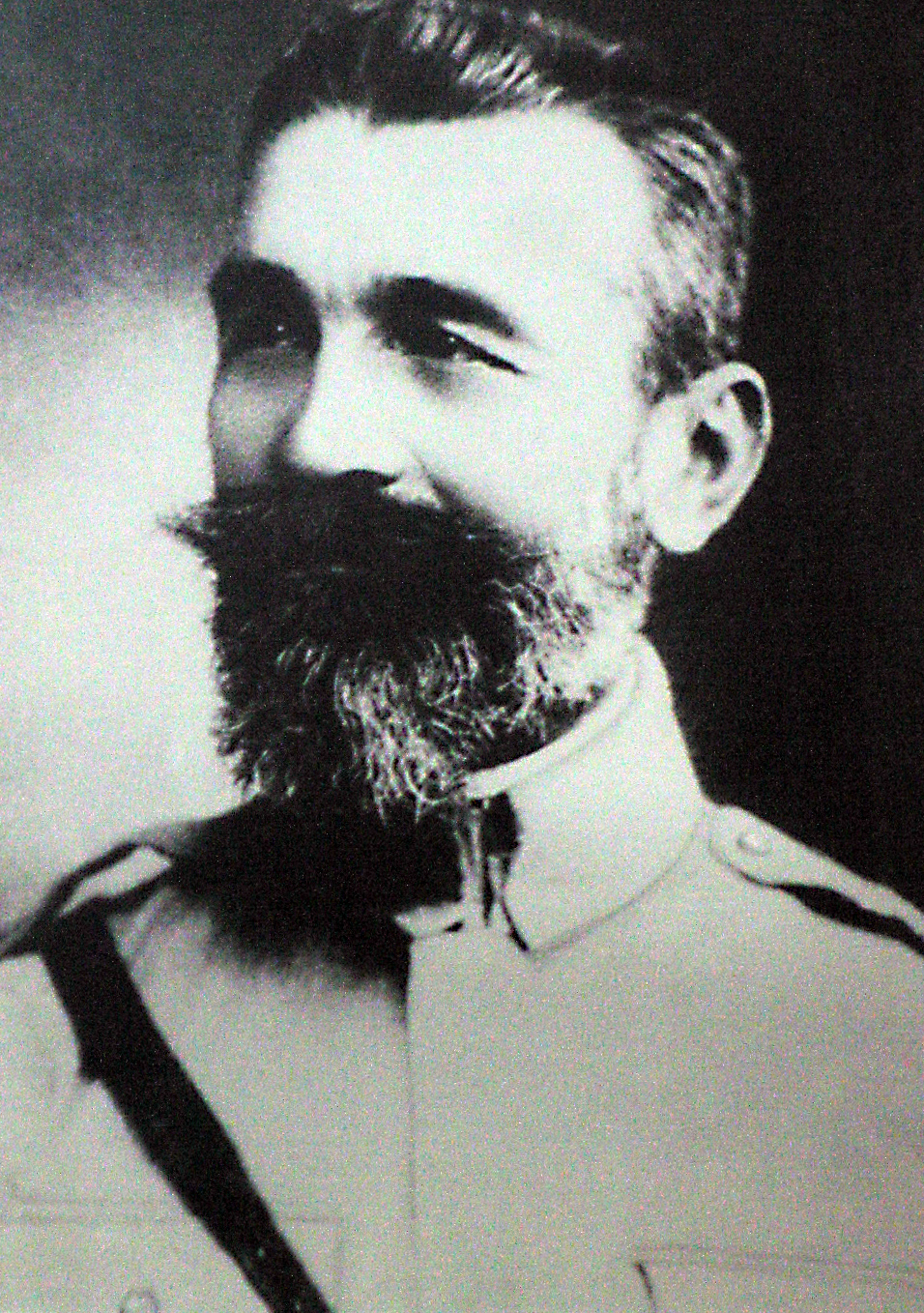
- Born: 15 April 1869; Vaslui, Romania
- Died: 2 December 1939 (aged 70); Bucharest, Kingdom of Romania
- Alma mater: Higher War School
- Children: Maria Holban
- Military career
- Allegiance: Romania
- Branch: Army
- Rank: division general
- Conflicts: World War I Hungarian–Romanian War

44th Minister of War
- In office 17 December 1921 – 19 January 1922
- Prime Minister: Take Ionescu
- Preceded by: Ioan Rășcanu
- Succeeded by: Ion I. C. Brătianu

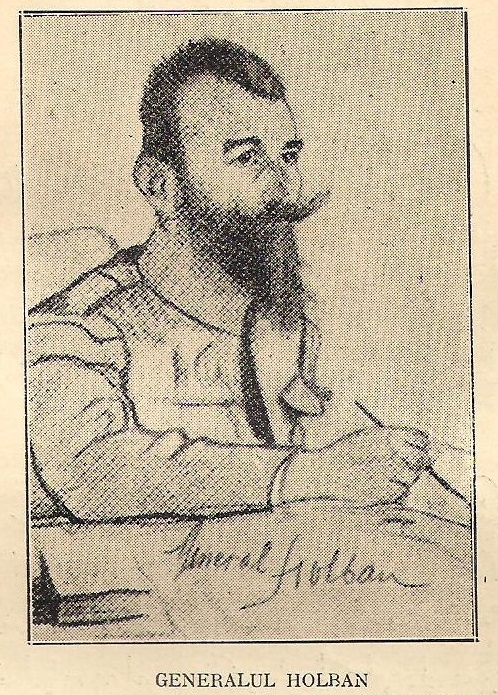
General Holban, as Military Governor of Budapest, 1919.

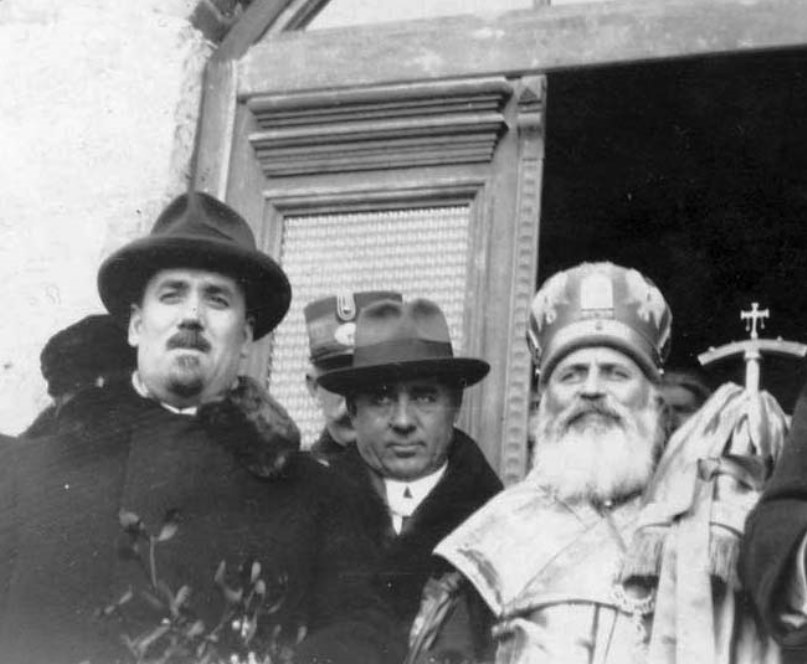
Ștefan Holban (center), together with Pan Halippa and Metropolitan Gurie Grosu, present at a religious event in Nisporeni, 1930.

Ștefan Holban (15 May 1869 — 2 December 1939) was a Romanian general and politician who participated in the Hungarian–Romanian War against the Bolshevik regime of Béla Kun in Hungary in 1919 and served as Minister of War from 1921—1922.

== Biography ==
Born in Vaslui, he graduated in 1889 from the School of Cavalry Officers, advancing in 1898 to the rank of captain. Between 1898 and 1900, he studied at the Higher War School. His daughter, Maria Holban, was born in 1901 and later became a noted historian.

He was promoted to the rank of colonel in 1914. In October 1916, after Romania entered World War I on the side of the Allies, he took command of the 9th and 19th Divisions of the Romanian Army. In 1917, he was promoted to the rank of brigadier general.

In June 1918, Holban was appointed commander of the 6th Division, which entered Transylvania at the end of 1918. On April 20, 1919, he marched into Oradea, together with General Traian Moșoiu (the commander of the Romanian Army Group North) and Colonel Dumitru Sachelarie. In July 1919, the forces under his command were covering a front line of some 150 km (93 mi); in the first echelon, there was the 18th Infantry Division of General Dănilă Papp, and in the second echelon, the 1st Vânători Division of General Aristide Lecca. On August 4, 1919, when the Romanian troops under the overall command of General Gheorghe Mărdărescu entered Budapest, Holban was appointed military governor of the city. As governor, he approved the freeing of prisoners detained by the communist regime at the Rákospalota camp and in other prisons, as well as the return of property confiscated by the Hungarian Soviet Republic.

In 1921, he was promoted to the rank of division general. He served as Minister of War in the Take Ionescu cabinet from 17 December 1921 to 19 January 1922.

He died in Bucharest in 1939. A street in Sector 1 of the capital city is named after him. A high school in Cărpineni, Moldova also bears his name.

== Bibliography ==
- Vasile Alexandrescu; Dumitru Preda; Costică Prodan (1994). În apărarea României Mari: Campania armatei române din 1918–1919 (in Romanian). București: Editura Enciclopedică. p. 141. ISBN 9734500945. OCLC 246777342.

Military offices
Preceded by Ioan Rășcanu	Minister of War; 17 December 1921 – 19 January 1922	Succeeded by Ion I. C. Brătianu (acting)
