= Ion Cămărășescu =

Romanian politician

Ion N. Cămărășescu
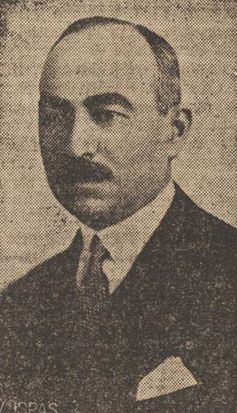

Prefect of Durostor County
- In office September 1913 – September 1916
- Prime Minister: Titu Maiorescu; Ion I. C. Brătianu

Minister of the Interior
- In office 17 December 1921 – 17 January 1922
- Prime Minister: Take Ionescu
- Preceded by: Constantin Argetoianu
- Succeeded by: Artur Văitoianu

Member of the Chamber of Deputies
- In office 1919–1933
- Constituency: Durostor County

Personal details
- Born: January 27, 1882 Bucharest, Kingdom of Romania
- Died: March 25, 1953 (aged 71) Sighet Prison, Romanian People's Republic
- Party: Conservative Party; Conservative-Democratic Party; Peasants' Party; National Peasants' Party
- Spouse: Yvonne Blondel (m. 1909; div. 1918) Zoe Bengescu
- Children: 2
- Education: University of Paris
- Occupation: Lawyer, politician

Ion N. Cămărășescu (January 27, 1882 – March 25, 1953) was a Romanian politician.

He was born in Bucharest, the son of Nicolae Cămărășescu, who owned a 2,500 ha (6,200 acres) estate in the Bărăgan Plain. He completed high school in his native city, and then studied at the University of Paris, taking a degree in law. After returning home, he practiced law in the Bucharest bar. He married in 1909 Yvonne Blondel, the daughter of Camille Blondel, the French ambassador to Romania; the couple would divorce in 1918. Afterwards, he married Zoe, née Bengescu (1896–1987), with whom he would have two sons, Ion I. (born 1927) and Nicolae (born 1929). Cămărășescu developed a keen interest in sports, being one of the founders (together with George Valentin Bibescu) of the Romanian Automobile Club in 1904 and of the Romanian Olympic Committee on March 27, 1914. He himself practiced several sports: tennis, horse riding, skiing, and bobsleigh, being in 1909 the first Romanian participant in a Winter Olympics (in the bobsled competition in Stockholm). He was the organizer of the first cycling tour of Romania in 1910, the year in which he also participated in the automobile competition on the Bucharest–Târgoviște route, which he won with an hourly average of 100 km/h (62 mph), a European record at the time.

Cămărășescu began his political career in the Conservative Party, serving as cabinet director for Constantin G. Dissescu, Religious Affairs and Public Instruction Minister in 1906–1907. In 1908, he was a founding member of Take Ionescu's Conservative-Democratic Party. In September 1913, after the Second Balkan War ended, he was named as prefect of the newly formed Durostor County. He served in this position until September 1916, after Romania entered World War I and Bulgaria regained the province. He then served as liaison to the Imperial Russian Army in Western Moldavia. After the war, he was first elected to the Assembly of Deputies in 1919, representing Durostor there until 1933. He was named Interior Minister in Ionescu's short-lived government, which lasted from December 1921 to January 1922.

Later in 1922, Cămărășescu joined the Peasants' Party. When this evolved into the National Peasants' Party in 1926, he remained part of the new formation. From 1928 to 1930, he presided over the Union of Agricultural Chambers. When the Little Entente's Economic Council was created in 1933, he was selected as head of the Romanian delegation. In 1937, he was named by the Agriculture Ministry to the Higher Economic Council, joining the Higher Agricultural Council later that year. He refused to collaborate with the National Renaissance Front royal dictatorship of King Carol II. In In the early 1940s he was living in a grand villa (which now bears his name), located near Piața Unirii, in downtown Bucharest.

In March 1949, the communist regime nationalized his farm in Dâlga and assigned Cămărășescu and his family to forced residence in Curtea de Argeș. Arrested together with other former dignitaries by the Securitate in May 1950, he died at Sighet Prison three years later, and was buried in a mass grave.
