= Third Battle of Oituz =

1917 World War I conflict in Eastern Romania

- Part of the 1917 Romanian Campaign of World War I
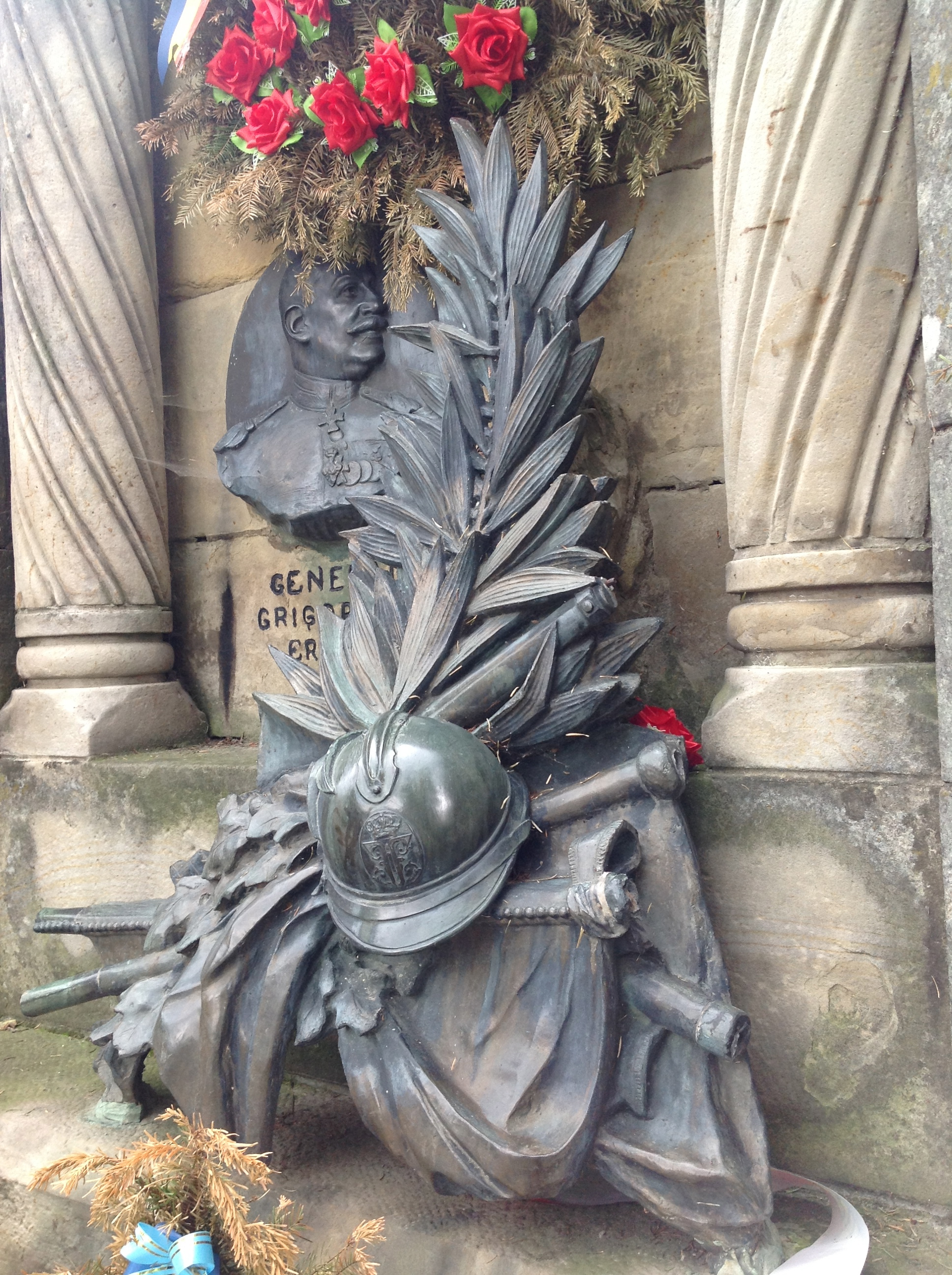
- Monument to the heroes of Oituz
Date	8–22 August 1917
Location	Border of Austria-Hungary and Romania (today in Bacău and Covasna counties, eastern Romania) 46°12′32.91″N 26°26′27.7″E
Result	Romanian defensive victory

Belligerents
Romania (flag) Russian Republic	Austria-Hungary; German Empire

Commanders and leaders
(Kingdom of Romania) Alexandru Averescu (Kingdom of Romania) Artur Văitoianu (Kingdom of Romania) Gheorghe Văleanu	(Austria-Hungary) Franz Rohr von Denta

Strength
Unknown	Unknown

Casualties and losses
Unknown	1,500+

The Third Battle of Oituz was a confrontation between Romanian and, to a lesser extent, Russian forces on one side and German and Austro-Hungarian forces on the other, during the Romanian Campaign of World War I. The battle took place primarily in the Oituz valley on the border between Hungary and Romania, from 8 to 22 August 1917.

== Prelude and order of battle ==
The Austro-Hungarian First Army planned to attack Romanian positions along the Oituz valley, primarily using the Gerok Group, which had recently participated in the Battle of Mărăști. The 8th Corps would undertake the main effort; it comprised one German and two Austro-Hungarian infantry divisions deployed between Valea Dofteanei and Măgura Cașinului, and two Austro-Hungarian cavalry divisions in reserve. In front of them, the Romanian Second Army deployed the 2nd and 4th Corps, with a total of six infantry divisions (1st, 3rd, 6th, 7th, 9th, 12th) and two reserve battalions. The attack would be carried out on a 7 kilometres (4.3 miles) front, and the Romanians were outnumbered 4 to 1. Several kilometres behind the Romanian lines was the Trotuș River valley, which led to the rear of the Romanian and Russian front; thus, a successful Central Powers offensive at Oituz could have had potentially disastrous effects for the Allied war effort in Romania.

== The battle ==
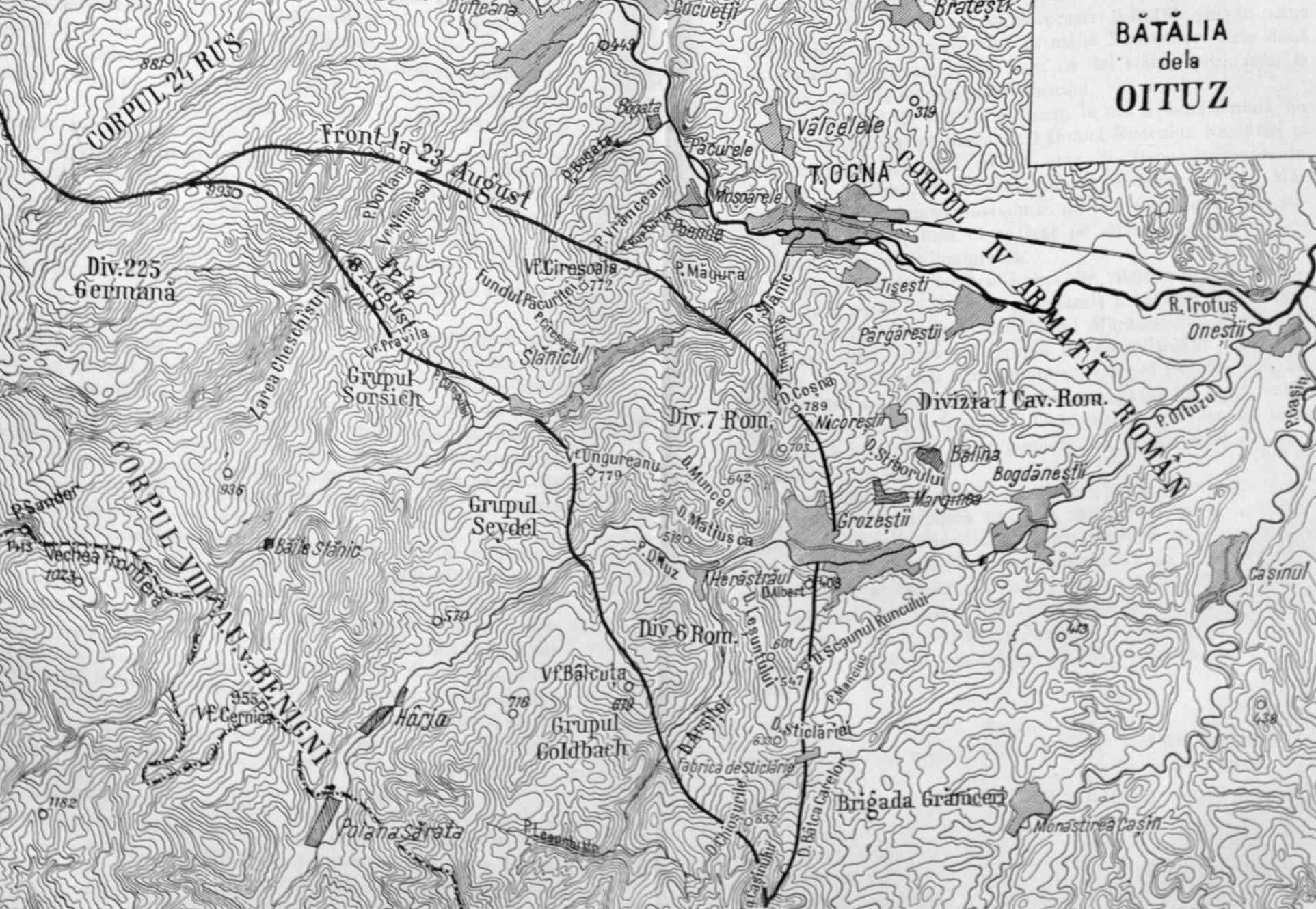
Map of the Battle of Oituz

The attack began on 8 August, after a violent four-hour artillery barrage. The fortified Pravila peak, held by the Romanian 27th Dorobanṭi Regiment "Bacău", was assaulted four times by the Austro-Hungarian 70th Infantry Division, without result. The German 117th Infantry division was more successful advancing 1 to 2 kilometres (0.62 to 1.24 miles) around Ungureanu peak and inflicting heavy losses on the 16th Dorobanṭi Regiment "Baia". To the south, the 10th Dorobanṭi Regiment "Putna" managed to hold its ground. During the night, the Romanian 4th Corps counterattacked in the German-held areas, taking 200 prisoners and retaking some lost ground. The following afternoon, however, the Central Powers attacked in force, taking Pravila peak and advancing near Coșna Hill. The Romanian 7th Infantry Division retreated to a new defensive line. Violent fighting continued on 10 August, exhausting the Romanians, who could not reinforce their lines properly due to the concurrent fighting at Mărășești. Only the 1st Cavalry Division arrived on 11 August, immediately entering combat and recapturing the area south of Coșna Hill and Stibor Hill in the evening. German units which occupied the village of Oituz were pushed back by the mountain troops and armored cars of the 2nd Corps.

On 12 August the newly-arrived Vânători de munte (Mountain troops) Battalion, after a 160 kilometres (99 miles) march and a 20-minute rest, attacked Cireșoaia peak, in tandem with the 27th Regiment, one other Romanian and two Russian battalions. The mountain troops broke through the 70th Infantry Division's defenses, taking 417 prisoners, while suffering only 21 casualties. The Austro-Hungarian division suffered nearly 1,500 casualties in total at Cireșoaia.

On 13 August another Romanian reinforcement, the Grăniceri (Border Guards) Brigade, attacked Central Powers positions south of the Oituz river, losing more than 800 men while gaining little ground. The 1st Cavalry Division retook Coșna Hill and held it against German counterattacks. At Cireșoaia, the 7th Infantry Division attacked together with the Russian 2nd Infantry Division; after initial gains, the Russian 195th Infantry Regiment was repelled, and Austro-Hungarian troops threatened the Romanians' flanks. Subsequently, the advance was halted.

Erwin Rommel later described the August 1917 fighting in the Oituz Valley from the German perspective. His detailed account in the 1937 book Infantry Attacks recalls his experiences as a junior officer leading an ad hoc multi-company grouping of German mountain troops near Coșna Hill.
