= Ioan Rășcanu =

Romanian general

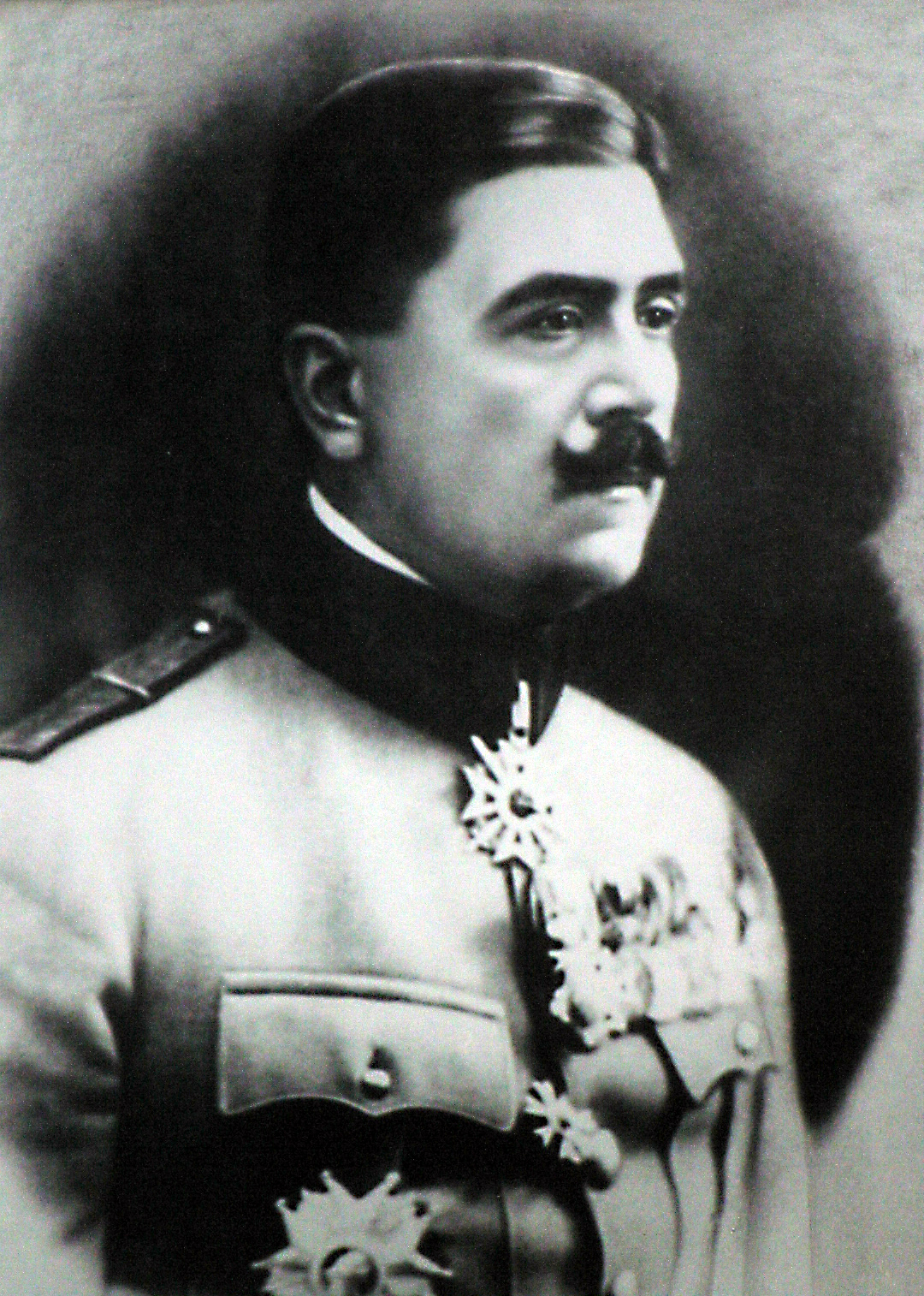
- General Ioan Rășcanu
- Born: 1 October [O.S. 19 September] 1878; Cahul, United Principalities of Moldavia and Wallachia
- Died: 25 February 1952 (aged 73); Sighet Prison, Romanian People's Republic
- Burial place: Paupers Cemetery, Sighetu Marmației, Maramureș County
- Education: Higher War School
- Military career
- Allegiance: Kingdom of Romania
- Branch: Army
- Service years: 1893–1922 (active); 1922–1945 (reserve)
- Rank: Brigadier general (1917); Major general (1922); Lieutenant general (1942)
- Commands: 15th Artillery Brigade; Vânători First Division
- Conflicts: Second Balkan War; World War I; Romanian campaign
- Awards: Order of the Crown, Commander rank Order of the Star of Romania, Officer class Order of the Star of Romania, Grand Cross class

42nd Minister of War of Kingdom of Romania
- In office September 27, 1919 – November 30, 1919
- Prime Minister: Artur Văitoianu
- Preceded by: Artur Văitoianu
- Succeeded by: himself
- In office December 1, 1919 – March 1, 1920
- Prime Minister: Alexandru Vaida-Voevod
- Preceded by: himself
- Succeeded by: Traian Moșoiu
- In office March 12, 1920 – December 15, 1921
- Prime Minister: Alexandru Averescu
- Preceded by: Traian Moșoiu
- Succeeded by: Ștefan Holban

Minister of State for Bessarabia and Bukovina
- In office March 30, 1926 – July 4, 1927
- Prime Minister: Alexandru Averescu
- Preceded by: Ion Inculeț
- In office April 18, 1931 – June 6, 1932
- Prime Minister: Nicolae Iorga
- Preceded by: Pan Halippa
- Succeeded by: Pan Halippa

55th Mayor of Bucharest
- In office November 15, 1942 – August 23, 1944
- Preceded by: Constantin Florescu
- Succeeded by: Victor Dombrovski

Ioan Rășcanu (1 October [O.S. 19 September] 1878 – February 25, 1952) was a Romanian general during World War I. He held the post of Minister of War from September 27, 1919 to December 16, 1921. After entering politics, he was elected deputy in Parliament, and served as Mayor of Vaslui (1938–1942) and Bucharest (1942–1944). Arrested in 1947 by the early communist regime, he died several years later at Sighet Prison.

== Early life ==
He was born in 1878 in Cahul, in south-western Bessarabia (now in Moldova), the son of Elefterie and Elena Rășcanu. Soon after, the family moved to Vaslui, where the parents taught at School Nr. 1 for boys. Growing up, he attended this school, where he befriended his classmate, Gheorghe Mironescu, who later became Prime Minister.

After graduating the High School for Sons of Military in Iași, Rășcanu went to Bucharest in July 1891, where he enlisted in the School for Artillery and Engineering Officers, graduating in July 1893 with the rank of second lieutenant. For two years he commanded a platoon of the 4th Artillery Regiment, after which he attended the Artillery School (1895–1897) and then Higher War School in Bucharest (1898–1900), where he was colleague with the future generals Ernest Broșteanu, Ștefan Holban, and Ioan Vernescu.

== Career in the Romanian Army ==
Rășcanu advanced in rank to lieutenant (April 1896), captain (March 1903), and major (March 1910). Speaking several languages (Russian, German, English, and French), he served from 1907 to 1911 as Romania's military attaché in Germany. From 1910 to 1912 he served on the General Staff of the Romanian Army. He was awarded in 1909 the Order of the Crown, Commander rank, and in 1912 the Order of the Star of Romania, Officer class. In 1913 he participated in the Second Balkan War, and was decorated with the Avântul Țării Medal. He was promoted to lieutenant colonel in April 1914 and became colonel in April 1916.

== World War I ==
After Romania entered World War I on the side of the Allies in August 1916, Rășcanu served as Chief of the Operations Section of the General Headquarters, and was attached to the General Staff of the French Army in 1916. Together with a fellow artilleryman, Colonel Vasile Rudeanu, he represented the Romanian High Command at the Third Chantilly Conference in November 1916.

In the summer of 1917 Rășcanu fought at the battles of Mărășești, Mărăști, and Oituz. Promoted to brigadier general in September 1917, he took command of the 15th Artillery Brigade. He represented the Romanian Army at the Armistice of Focșani from December 7, 1917, between Romania, Russia, and the Central Powers.

In January 1918 he became the first commander of the newly formed Vânători 1st Division. In March his division crossed the Prut River and he replaced General Ernest Broșteanu (his classmate at the Higher War School) as commander of the Romanian troops in Chișinău and central Bessarabia. His troops paraded in support on March 27, when Sfatul Țării voted the Union of Bessarabia with Romania. The 1st Division was disbanded in May 1918 as a result of the Treaty of Bucharest with the Central Powers.

== Political career ==
After serving as Secretary General of the Ministry of War from December 1, 1918 to September 27, 1919, Rășcanu became Minister of War, serving in three successive governments, led by Prime Ministers Artur Văitoianu (September 27 – November 30, 1919), Alexandru Vaida-Voevod (December 1, 1919 – March 1, 1920), and Alexandru Averescu (March 12, 1920 – December 15, 1921). At his initiative, the Land Forces Academy was established in Sibiu in July 1920. In April 1921 he was promoted to major general, after which he retired in 1922, and was put in reserve.

Rășcanu returned to Vaslui, where he became a leading member of the National Liberal Party (PNL) and the People's Party, led by Averescu. He was elected to the Chamber of Deputies at the parliamentary elections of 1920, 1926, 1928, and 1931. He was Minister of State and High Commissioner for Bessarabia and Bukovina in the Third Averescu cabinet from March 30, 1926 to July 4, 1927, and Minister of State in the Iorga cabinet from April 18, 1931 to June 6, 1932. The national cabinet allowed Bessarabian notables to provide input on its economic policies, with a Bessarabian Economic Council that was chaired by Rășcanu.

From 1938 to December 1942 he was Mayor of Vaslui. In June 1940, together with other generals of the Romanian Army and political figures from Bessarabia, he opposed the Soviet ultimatum demanding that Romania cede Bessarabia, saying: "No nation can surrender its territories without fighting!" From November 15, 1942 to King Michael's Coup of August 23, 1944, he was Mayor of Bucharest. In December 1942 he was promoted to lieutenant general (Reserve), and was awarded the Order of the Star of Romania, Grand Cross class.

== Last years ==
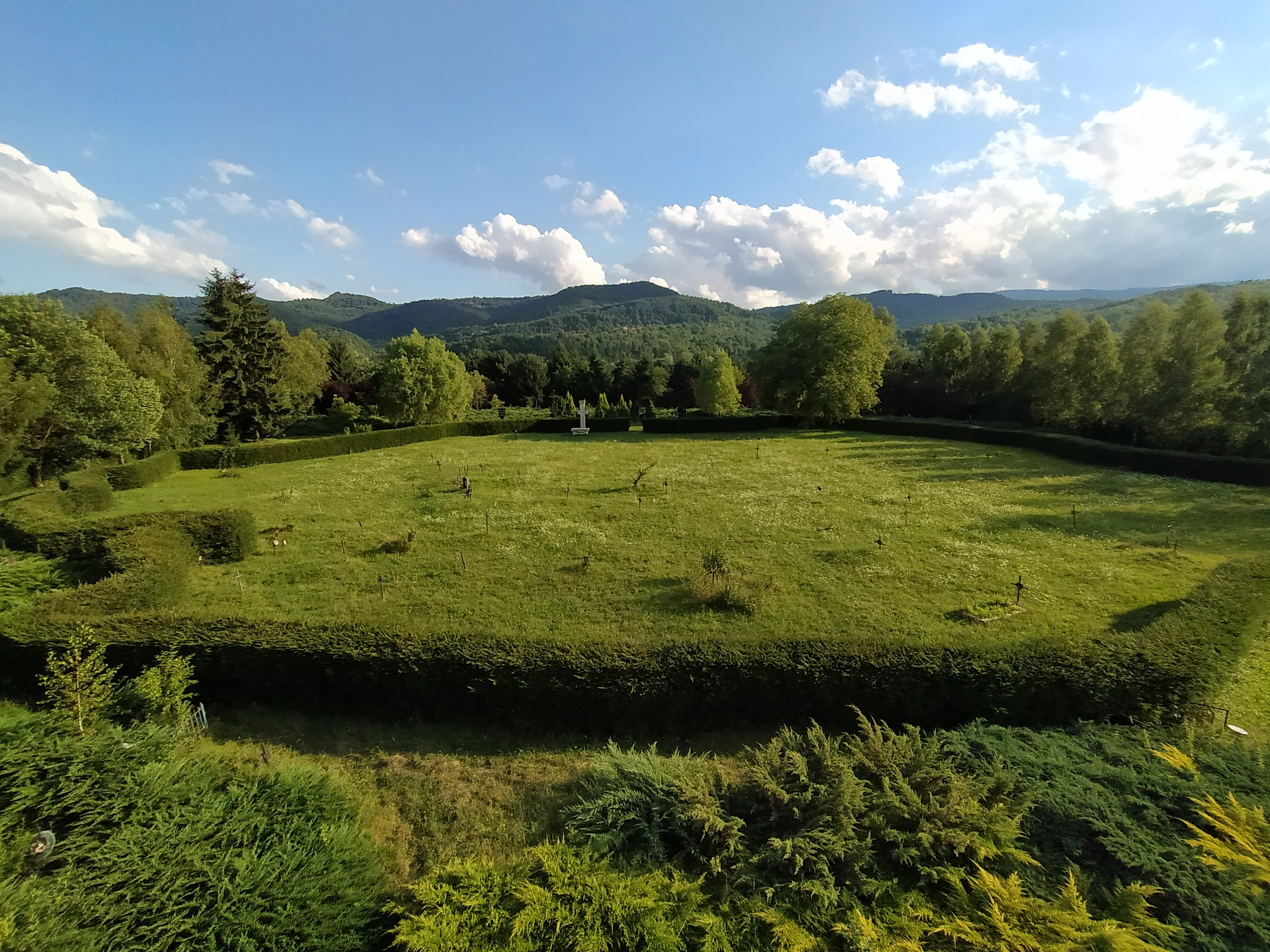
Paupers Cemetery in Sighetu Marmației

In February 1945 he permanently retired from the Army. In May 1947 he was arrested by the Communist authorities and interrogated at the headquarters of the Ministry of Internal Affairs. He was condemned on August 1, 1951 to 2 years of incarceration. Rășcanu was sent to Sighet Prison, where he died in February 1952, after a harsh detention regime. He was buried at the Paupers Cemetery (also known as Cearda Cemetery) in Sighetu Marmației, in a common grave on the banks of the Iza River.

A street in Vaslui is named after him. In 2018, a bust of Rășcanu was erected in the city's Mihail Kogălniceanu Park.
