= Artur Văitoianu =

Romanian general and Prime Minister (1864–1956)

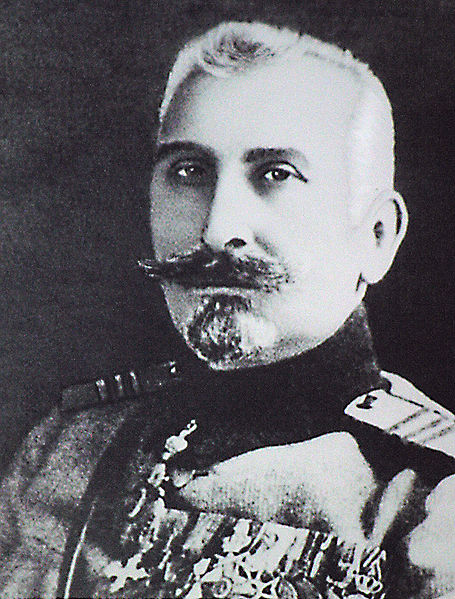
- General Artur Văitoianu

Prime Minister of Romania
- In office 1 October 1919 – 9 December 1919
- Monarch: Ferdinand I
- Preceded by: Ion I.C. Brătianu
- Succeeded by: Alexandru Vaida-Voievod

Minister of National Defense
- In office 29 November 1918 – 26 September 1919
- Prime Minister: Ion I. C. Brătianu
- Preceded by: Eremia Grigorescu
- Succeeded by: Ioan Rășcanu

Minister of the Interior
- In office 24 October 1918 – 29 November 1918
- Prime Minister: Himself
- Preceded by: Alexandru Marghiloman
- Succeeded by: Gheorghe Gh. Mârzescu
- In office 19 January 1922 – 30 October 1923
- Prime Minister: Ion I. C. Brătianu
- Preceded by: Ion Cămărășescu
- Succeeded by: Ion I. C. Brătianu

Personal details
- Born: 14 April 1864 Izmail, United Principalities
- Died: 17 June 1956 (aged 92) Bucharest, Romanian People's Republic
- Party: National Liberal Party
- Education: University of Bucharest
- Profession: Soldier, politician

Military service
- Allegiance: Kingdom of Romania
- Branch/service: Romanian Land Forces
- Years of service: 1884–1920
- Rank: General de corp de armată
- Commands: 10th Infantry Regiment, 11th Infantry Brigade, 10th Infantry Division, 2nd Army Corps
- Battles/wars: World War I; Battle of Predeal Pass; Battle of Mărăști; Hungarian–Romanian War

Artur or Arthur Văitoianu (14 April 1864 in Izmail – 17 June 1956) was a Romanian general who served as a Prime Minister of Romania for about two months in 1919 (27 September – 30 November). During his mandate, the first elections of Greater Romania were held.

== Career ==
He was born in Izmail, then part of the United Principalities of Moldavia and Wallachia. His father, Teodor Weithoffer Văitoianu, was a Bessarabian German, while his mother, Maria Missir, was Romanian. Historian Neagu Djuvara claimed that Weithoffer Văitoianu was Jewish, comverting to Eastern Orthodoxy in the 1850s. He rose through the ranks of the Romanian Army and, during the World War I Battle of Mărăști, he commanded the Second Corps.

Earlier in the War, during the Romanian Campaign of 1916, he commanded the 10th Infantry Division at the Battle of Predeal Pass, in defense of Prahova Valley. He managed to block the Central Powers from reaching Bucharest via the shortest way, thus preventing them from cutting off and surrounding the Romanian Army and by implication knock the country out of the war. It was a decisive victory that enabled Romania to wage war until 1918, when it had to surrender after Russia did the same, leaving Romania alone on the Eastern Front and surrounded by the Central Powers, a situation that far surpassed its military capacities.

A War and Interior Minister in Ion I. C. Brătianu's cabinet, he came to lead the executive upon the latter's resignation over the Allied Powers' refusal to recognize the territorial awards promised to Romania upon its 1916 entry into the conflict (on the basis of Romania having signed a separate peace with the Central Powers, the Treaty of Bucharest, in the previous year); in the short hiatus, no Romanian authority was present at the signing of the Treaty of Saint-Germain with Austria.

Văitoianu took office as Romanian troops were engaged in an expedition to Hungary, where they were fighting against the newly proclaimed Hungarian Soviet Republic. The Supreme War Council of Allied Powers gave Romania an 8-day ultimatum to retreat its troops from Budapest to the provisional border settled by the Paris Peace Conference and to cease confiscation of Hungarian property, as well as to sign the peace with Austria and agree to guarantee minority rights throughout Greater Romania. Văitoianu's government refused to comply, and handed in its resignation on 30 November, leaving room for the bloc formed in Parliament by the Romanian National Party of Transylvania and the Peasants' Party of the Regat to form the Alexandru Vaida-Voevod cabinet, one which soon agreed to the Allies' demands.

He was a high-ranking member of the National Liberal Party-Brătianu for much of his political career.

Artur Văitoianu was buried in the World War I heroes' crypt in Mărăști. In 2007, the local authorities claimed that Văitoianu's and Averescu's remains were stolen from their crypts, asking for the Prosecution Office to investigate.

== Gallery ==
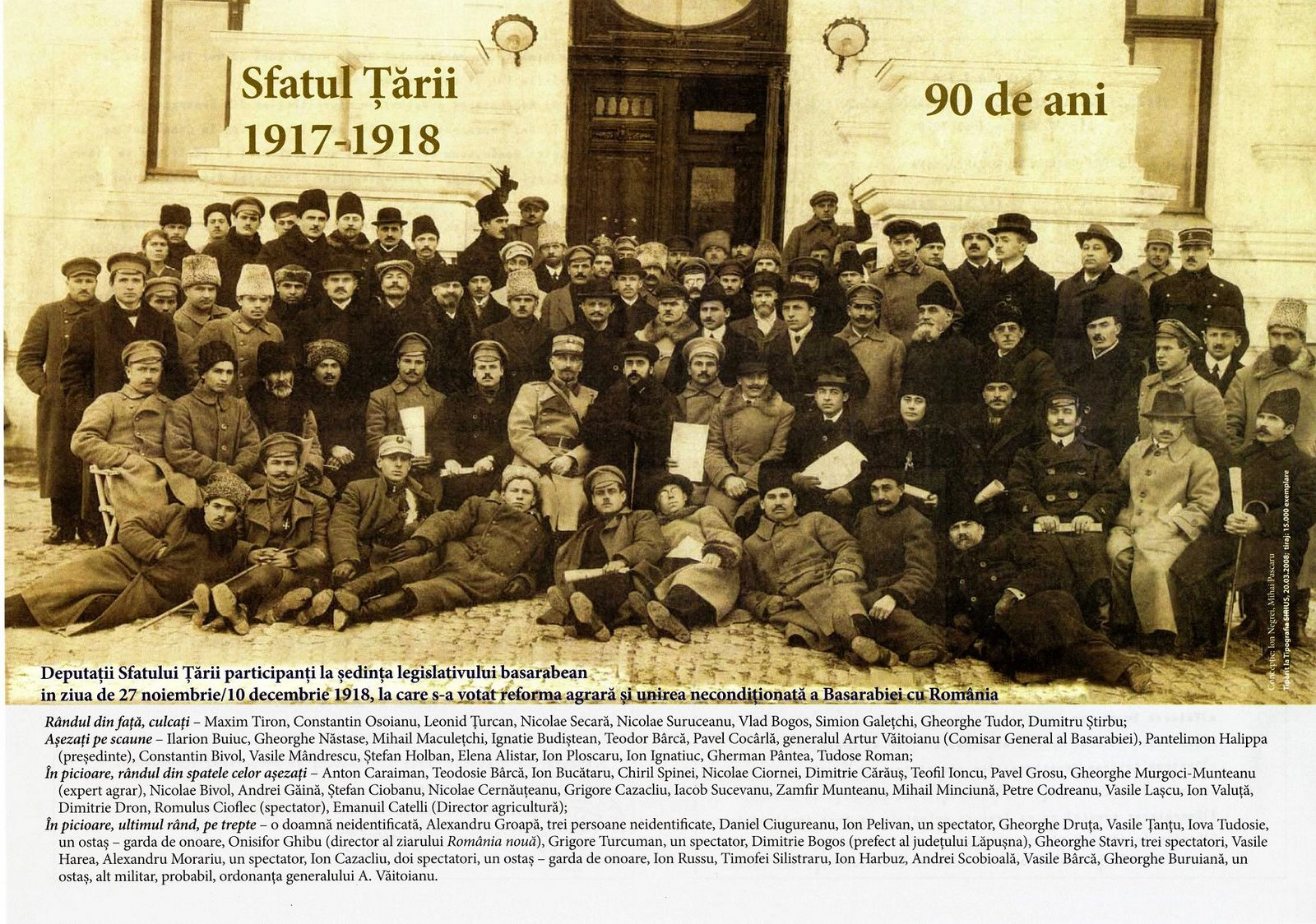
Sfatul Țării Palace, 10 December 1918
