= Duca cabinet =

Romanian cabinet

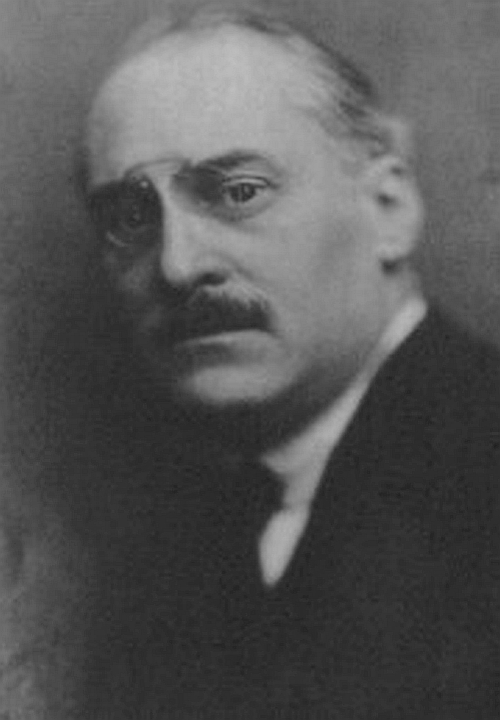
Ion G. Duca

The cabinet of Ion G. Duca was the government of Romania from 14 November to 29 December 1933.

== Composition ==
The ministers of the cabinet were as follows:

- President of the Council of Ministers:

- Ion Gh. Duca (14 November - 29 December 1933)

- Minister of the Interior:

- Ion Inculeț (14 November - 29 December 1933)

- Minister of Foreign Affairs:

- Nicolae Titulescu (14 November - 29 December 1933)

- Minister of Finance:

- Constantin I. C. Brătianu (14 November - 29 December 1933)

- Minister of Justice:

- Victor Antonescu (14 November - 29 December 1933)

- Minister of Public Instruction, Religious Affairs, and the Arts:

- Constantin Angelescu (14 November - 29 December 1933)

- Minister of National Defence:

- Gen. Nicolae Uică (14 November - 29 December 1933)

- Minister of Agriculture and Property

- Gheorghe Cipăianu (14 November - 29 December 1933)

- Minister of Industry and Commerce:

- Gheorghe Tătărăscu (14 November - 29 December 1933)

- Minister of Labour, Health, and Social Security:

- Constantin D. Dimitriu (14 November - 29 December 1933)

- Minister of Public Works and Communications:

- Richard Franasovici (14 November - 29 December 1933)

- Ministers of State:

- Ion Nistor (14 November - 29 December 1933)
- Alexandru Lapedatu (14 November - 29 December 1933)

| Preceded by Fourth Vaida-Voevod cabinet | Cabinet of Romania; 14 November 1933 - 29 December 1933 | Succeeded by Angelescu cabinet |
