= Angelescu cabinet =

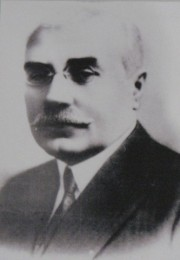
Constantin Angelescu

The cabinet of Constantin Angelescu was the government of Romania from 30 December 1933 to 3 January 1934.

== Composition ==
The ministers of the cabinet were as follows:

- President of the Council of Ministers:

- Constantin Angelescu (30 December 1933 - 3 January 1934)

- Minister of the Interior:

- Ion Inculeț (30 December 1933 - 3 January 1934)

- Minister of Foreign Affairs:

- Nicolae Titulescu (30 December 1933 - 3 January 1934)

- Minister of Finance:

- Constantin I. C. Brătianu (30 December 1933 - 3 January 1934)

- Minister of Justice:

- Victor Antonescu (30 December 1933 - 3 January 1934)

- Minister of Public Instruction, Religious Affairs, and the Arts:

- Constantin Angelescu (30 December 1933 - 3 January 1934)

- Minister of National Defence:

- Gen. Nicolae Uică (30 December 1933 - 3 January 1934)

- Minister of Agriculture and Property

- Gheorghe Cipăianu (30 December 1933 - 3 January 1934)

- Minister of Industry and Commerce:

- Gheorghe Tătărăscu (30 December 1933 - 3 January 1934)

- Minister of Labour, Health, and Social Security:

- Constantin D. Dimitriu (30 December 1933 - 3 January 1934)

- Minister of Public Works and Communications:

- Richard Franasovici (30 December 1933 - 3 January 1934)

- Ministers of State:

- Ion Nistor (30 December 1933 - 3 January 1934)
- Alexandru Lapedatu (30 December 1933 - 3 January 1934)

Preceded by Duca cabinet	Cabinet of Romania; 30 December 1933 - 3 January 1934	Succeeded by First Tătărăscu cabinet
