= Second Tătărăscu cabinet =

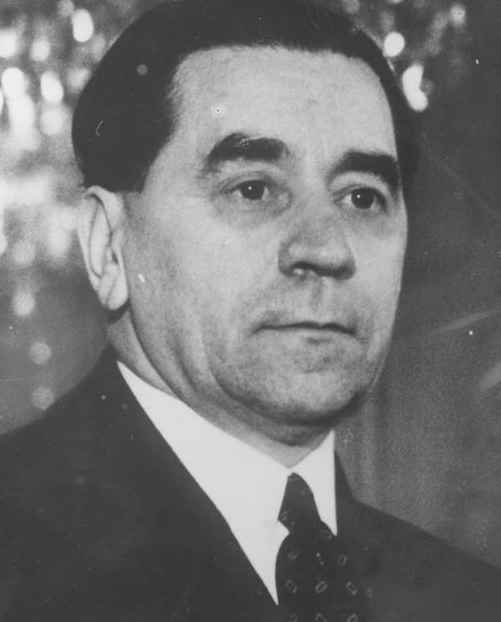
Gheorghe Tătărăscu

The second cabinet of Gheorghe Tătărăscu was the government of Romania from 2 October 1934 to 28 August 1936.

== Composition ==
The ministers of the cabinet were as follows:

- President of the Council of Ministers:

- Gheorghe Tătărăscu (2 October 1934 - 28 August 1936)

- Minister of the Interior:

- Ion Inculeț (2 October 1934 - 28 August 1936)

- Minister of Foreign Affairs:

- (interim) Gheorghe Tătărăscu (2 - 10 October 1934)
- Nicolae Titulescu (10 October 1934 - 28 August 1936)

- Minister of Finance:

- Victor Slăvescu (2 October 1934 - 1 February 1935)
- Victor Antonescu (1 February 1935 - 28 August 1936)

- Minister of Justice:

- Victor Antonescu (2 October 1934 - 1 February 1935)
- Valeriu Pop (1 February 1935 - 28 August 1936)

- Minister of National Defence:

- Gen. Paul Angelescu (2 October 1934 - 28 August 1936)

- Minister of Armaments:

- Gheorghe Tătărăscu (2 October 1934 - 28 August 1936)

- Minister of Agriculture and Property

- Vasile P. Sassu (2 October 1934 - 28 August 1936)

- Minister of Industry and Commerce:

- (interim) Victor Slăvescu (2 - 5 October 1934)
- Ion Manolescu-Strunga (5 October 1934 - 1 August 1935)
- (interim) Ion Costinescu (1 August - 23 September 1935)
- Ion Costinescu (23 September 1935 - 28 August 1936)

- Minister of Public Works and Communications:

- Richard Franasovici (2 October 1934 - 28 August 1936)

- Minister of Public Instruction:

- Constantin Angelescu (2 October 1934 - 28 August 1936)

- Minister of Religious Affairs and the Arts:

- Alexandru Lapedatu (2 October 1934 - 28 August 1936)

- Minister of Labour:

- Ion Nistor (2 October 1934 - 23 September 1935)

- Minister of Health and Social Security:

- Ion Costinescu (2 October 1934 - 23 September 1935)

- Minister of Labour, Health and Social Security:

- Ion Nistor (23 September 1935 - 28 August 1936)

- Minister Secretaries of State:

- Valeriu Pop (2 October 1934 - 1 February 1935)
- Victor Iamandi (2 October 1934 - 28 August 1936)

Preceded by First Tătărăscu cabinet	Cabinet of Romania; 2 October 1934 - 28 August 1936	Succeeded by Third Tătărăscu cabinet
