= First Tătărăscu cabinet =

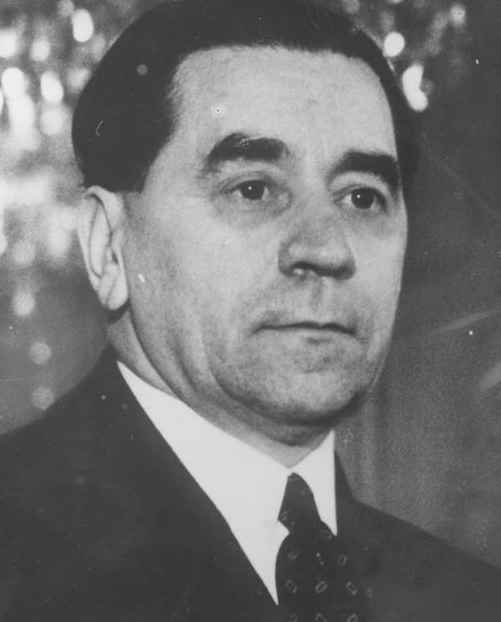
Gheorghe Tătărăscu

The first cabinet of Gheorghe Tătărăscu was the government of Romania from 5 January to 1 October 1934.

== Composition ==
The ministers of the cabinet were as follows:

- President of the Council of Ministers:

- Gheorghe Tătărăscu (5 January - 1 October 1934)

- Minister of the Interior:

- Ion Inculeț (5 January - 1 October 1934)

- Minister of Foreign Affairs:

- Nicolae Titulescu (5 January - 1 October 1934)

- Minister of Finance:

- Victor Slăvescu (5 January - 1 October 1934)

- Minister of Justice:

- Victor Antonescu (5 January - 1 October 1934)

- Minister of National Defence:

- Gen. Nicolae Uică (5 January - 31 May 1934)
- (interim) Gheorghe Tătărăscu (31 May - 27 June 1934)
- Gen. Paul Angelescu (27 June - 1 October 1934)

- Minister of Armaments:

- Gheorghe Tătărăscu (5 January - 1 October 1934)

- Minister of Agriculture and Property

- Gheorghe Cipăianu (5 January - 26 February 1934)
- Vasile P. Sassu (26 February - 1 October 1934)

- Minister of Industry and Commerce:

- Gheorghe Tătărăscu (5 - 30 January 1934)
- Vasile P. Sassu (30 January - 26 February 1934)
- Nicolae Teodorescu (26 February - 1 October 1934)

- Minister of Public Works and Communications:

- Richard Franasovici (5 January - 1 October 1934)

- Minister of Public Instruction, Religious Affairs, and the Arts:

- Constantin Angelescu (5 January - 1 October 1934)

- Minister of Labour, Health, and Social Security:

- Constantin D. Dimitriu (30 January - 26 February 1934)
- Ion Costinescu (26 February - 1 October 1934)

- Ministers of State:

- Alexandru Lapedatu (5 January - 1 October 1934), as of 9 June 1934, oversaw the Religious Affairs and Arts sections of the Ministry of Public Instruction, Religious Affairs, and the Arts, and held the title of Minister of Religious Affairs and the Arts
- Ion Nistor (5 January - 1 October 1934), as of 9 June 1934, oversaw some sections of the Ministry of Labour, Health, and Social Security and held the title of Minister of Labour
- Gen. Paul Angelescu (5 January - 1 October 1934)
- Constantin Xeni (26 February - 1 October 1934)

Preceded by Angelescu cabinet	Cabinet of Romania; 5 January 1934 - 1 October 1934	Succeeded by Second Tătărăscu cabinet
