= Sixth Tătărăscu cabinet =

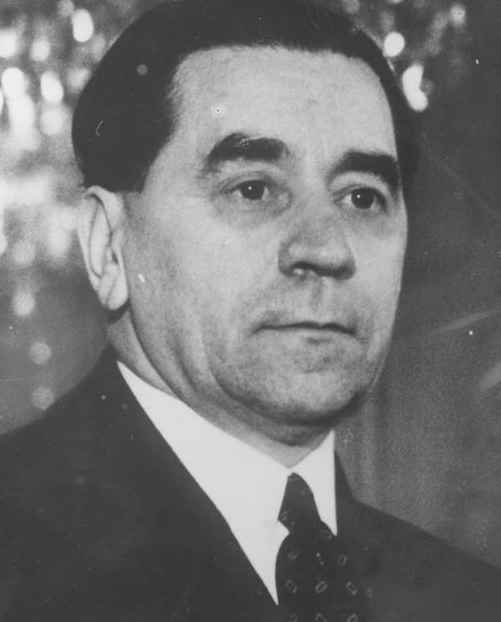
Gheorghe Tătărăscu

The sixth cabinet of Gheorghe Tătărăscu was the government of Romania from 11 May to 3 July 1940.

== Composition ==
The ministers of the cabinet were as follows:

- President of the Council of Ministers:

- Gheorghe Tătărăscu (11 May - 3 July 1940)

- Minister of the Interior:

- Mihail Ghelmegeanu (11 May - 3 July 1940)

- Minister of Foreign Affairs:

- Grigore Gafencu (11 May - 1 June 1940)
- Ion Gigurtu (1 - 28 June 1940)
- Constantin Argetoianu (28 June - 3 July 1940)

- Minister of Finance:

- Mitiță Constantinescu (11 May - 3 July 1940)

- Minister of Justice:

- Aurelian Bentoiu (11 May - 3 July 1940)

- Minister of National Defence:

- Gen. Ioan Ilcuș (11 May - 3 July 1940)

- Minister of Air and Marine:

- (interim) Gen. Ioan Ilcuș (11 May - 3 July 1940)

- Minister of Materiel:

- Victor Slăvescu (11 May - 3 July 1940)

- Minister of National Economy:

- Mircea Cancicov (11 May - 3 July 1940)

- Minister of Agriculture and Property

- Gheorghe Ionescu-Sisești (11 May - 3 July 1940)

- Minister of Public Works and Communications:

- Ion Gigurtu (11 May - 1 June 1940)
- Ion Macovei (1 June - 3 July 1940)

- Minister of Foreign Trade:

- Ion Christu (11 May - 28 June 1940)
- (interim) Mircea Cancicov (28 June - 3 July 1940)

- Minister of National Education:

- Petre Andrei (11 May - 3 July 1940)

- Minister of Religious Affairs and the Arts:

- Ștefan Ciobanu (11 May - 28 June 1940)
- Constantin C. Giurescu (28 June - 3 July 1940)

- Minister of Labour:

- Mihail Ralea (11 May - 3 July 1940)

- Minister of Health and Social Security

- Nicolae Hortolomei (11 May - 3 July 1940)

- Minister of Public Wealth:

- Traian Pop (11 May - 3 July 1940)

- Minister of Propaganda:

- Constantin C. Giurescu (11 May - 28 June 1940)
- Teofil Sidorovici (28 June - 3 July 1940)

- Minister of State for Minorities:

- Silviu Dragomir (11 May - 3 July 1940)

- Minister Secretary of State of the Presidency of the Council of Ministers:

- Radu Portocală (11 May - 28 June 1940)

- Minister Secretary of State:

- Ernest Urdăreanu (11 May - 28 June 1940)
- Alexandru Vaida-Voevod (28 June - 3 July 1940)
- Ion Inculeț (28 June - 3 July 1940)
- Ion Nistor (28 June - 3 July 1940)

Preceded by Fifth Tătărăscu cabinet	Cabinet of Romania; 11 May 1940 - 3 July 1940	Succeeded by Gigurtu cabinet
