= Fifth Tătărăscu cabinet =

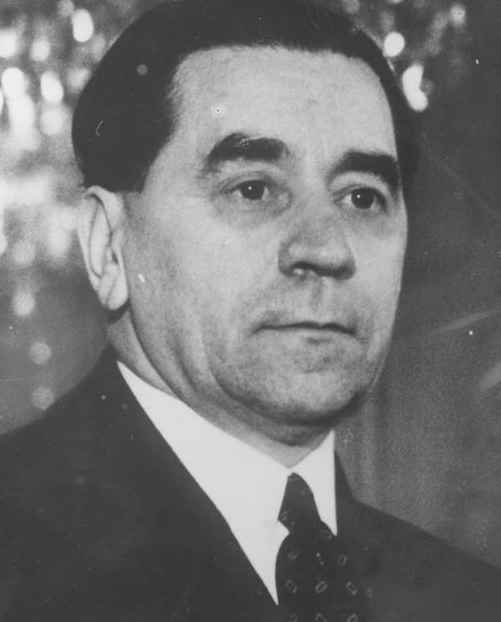
Gheorghe Tătărăscu

The fifth cabinet of Gheorghe Tătărăscu was the government of Romania from 24 November 1939 to 10 May 1940. The government resigned on 10 May 1940, but King Carol II asked Tătărăscu to form a new government.

== Composition ==
The ministers of the cabinet were as follows:

- President of the Council of Ministers:

- Gheorghe Tătărăscu (24 November 1939 – 10 May 1940)

- Minister of the Interior:

- (interim) Gheorghe Tătărăscu (24 – 30 November 1939)
- Mihail Ghelmegeanu (30 November 1939 – 10 May 1940)

- Minister of Foreign Affairs:

- Grigore Gafencu (24 November 1939 – 10 May 1940)

- Minister of Finance:

- Mitiță Constantinescu (24 November 1939 – 10 May 1940)

- Minister of Justice:

- Istrate Micescu (24 – 30 November 1939)
- Aurelian Bentoiu (30 November 1939 – 10 May 1940)

- Minister of National Defence:

- Gen. Ioan Ilcuș (24 November 1939 – 10 May 1940)

- Minister of Air and Marine:

- Gen. Paul Teodorescu (24 November 1939 – 10 May 1940)

- Minister of Materiel:

- Victor Slăvescu (24 November 1939 – 10 May 1940)

- Minister of National Economy:

- Constantin Angelescu (24 November 1939 – 10 May 1940)

- Minister of Agriculture and Property

- Gheorghe Ionescu-Sisești (24 November 1939 – 10 May 1940)

- Minister of Public Works and Communications:

- Ion Gigurtu (24 November 1939 - 10 May 1940)

- Minister of Foreign Trade:

- Ion Christu (16 February – 10 May 1940)

- Minister of National Education:

- Petre Andrei (24 November 1939 – 10 May 1940)

- Minister of Religious Affairs and the Arts:

- Ion Nistor (24 November 1939 – 10 May 1940)

- Minister of Labour:

- Mihail Ralea (24 November 1939 – 10 May 1940)

- Minister of Health and Social Security

- Nicolae Hortolomei (24 November 1939 – 10 May 1940)

- Minister of Propaganda:

- (interim) Grigore Gafencu (24 – 30 November 1939)
- Alexandru Radian (30 November 1939 – 4 March 1940)
- Constantin C. Giurescu (4 March – 10 May 1940)

- Minister of Public Wealth:

- Traian Pop (24 November 1939 – 10 May 1940)

- Minister in charge of the National Renaissance Front:

- Constantin C. Giurescu (24 November 1939 – 10 May 1940)

- Minister of State for Minorities:

- Silviu Dragomir (24 November 1939 – 10 May 1940)

- Minister Secretaries of State of the Presidency of the Council of Ministers:

- Radu Portocală (5 December 1939 – 10 May 1940)
- Ion Christu (9 – 16 February 1940)

Preceded by Argetoianu cabinet	Cabinet of Romania; 24 November 1939 - 10 May 1940	Succeeded by Sixth Tătărăscu cabinet
