= Sixth Ion I. C. Brătianu cabinet =

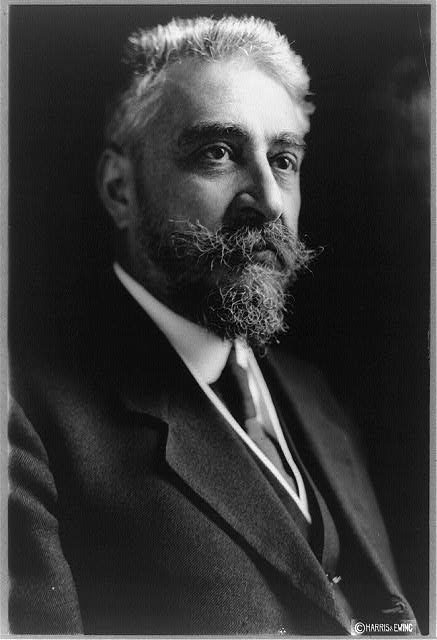
Ion I. C. Brătianu

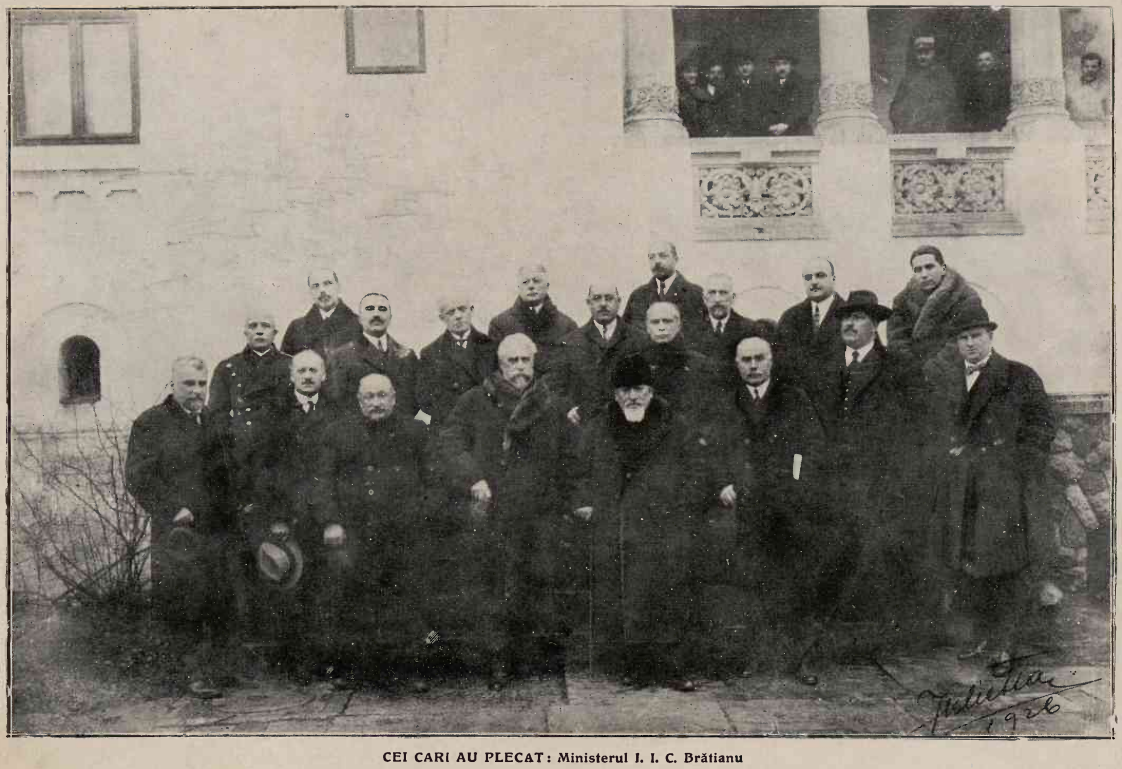
The sixth Ion I. C. Brătianu cabinet

The sixth cabinet of Ion I. C. Brătianu was the government of Romania from 19 January 1922 to 27 March 1926.

== Composition ==
The ministers of the cabinet were as follows:

- President of the Council of Ministers:

- Ion I. C. Brătianu (19 January 1922 - 27 March 1926)

- Minister of State:

- Ion Inculeț (19 January 1922 - 27 March 1926)

- Minister of State:

- Ion Nistor (19 January 1922 - 27 March 1926)

- Minister of the Interior:

- Gen. Artur Văitoianu (19 January 1922 - 30 October 1923)
- Ion I. C. Brătianu (30 October 1923 - 27 March 1926)

- Minister of Foreign Affairs:

- Ion Gh. Duca (19 January 1922 - 27 March 1926)

- Minister of Finance:

- Vintilă I.C. Brătianu (19 January 1922 - 27 March 1926)

- Minister of Justice:

- Ioan Th. Florescu (19 January 1922 - 30 October 1923)
- George G. Mârzescu (30 October 1923 - 27 March 1926)

- Minister of War:

- Ion I. C. Brătianu (19 January - 25 March 1922)
- Gen. Gheorghe Mărdărescu (25 March 1922 - 27 March 1926)

- Minister of Public Works:

- (interim) Constantin Banu (19 - 24 January 1922)
- Aurel Cosma (24 January 1922 - 30 October 1923)
- Gen. Traian Moșoiu (30 October 1923 - 27 March 1926)

- Minister of Communications:

- (interim) Constantin Angelescu (19 - 24 January 1922)
- Gen. Traian Moșoiu (24 January 1922 - 30 October 1923)
- Gen. Artur Văitoianu (30 October 1923 - 27 March 1926)

- Minister of Industry and Commerce:

- Vasile P. Sassu (19 January 1922 - 30 October 1923)
- Tancred Constantinescu (30 October 1923 - 27 March 1926)

- Minister of Public Instruction:

- Constantin Angelescu (19 January 1922 - 27 March 1926)

- Minister of Religious Affairs and the Arts:

- Constantin Banu (19 January 1922 - 30 October 1923)
- Alexandru Lapedatu (30 October 1923 - 27 March 1926)

- Minister of Agriculture and interim Minister of Property:

- Alexandru Constantinescu (19 January - 10 April 1922)

- Minister of Agriculture and Property:

- Alexandru Constantinescu (10 April 1922 - 27 March 1926)

- Minister of Labour and Social Security:

- George G. Mârzescu (19 January - 26 April 1922)

- Minister of Public Health, Labour and Social Welfare:

- George G. Mârzescu (26 April 1922 - 30 October 1923)
- Nicolae N. Săveanu (30 October - 3 November 1923)

- Minister of Public Health and Social Welfare:

- Nicolae N. Săveanu (3 November 1923 - 27 March 1926)

- Ministry of Labour, Social Insurance and Cooperation:

- Nicolae Chirculescu (3 November 1923 - 27 March 1926)

Preceded by Ionescu cabinet	Cabinet of Romania; 19 January 1922 - 27 March 1926	Succeeded by Third Averescu cabinet
