= Mihail Priboianu =

Romanian engineer and politician

Mihail M. Priboianu (also known as Bubi Priboianu; January 26, 1892—after 1955) was a Romanian engineer.

He was born in Bucharest, the son of general (later Marshal of the Court) Mihail Priboianu and his wife Lucreția, née Baranga, and a cousin of Armand Călinescu. After completing high school in his native city, Priboianu graduated from the Paris School of Mines and became an engineer. In 1929, he entered the Higher Mine Council, and also belonged to the Higher Technical Council in the Ministry of Public Works. A member of the Peasants' Party and later of the National Peasants' Party, he was president of the latter organization's Durostor County chapter. Between 1929 and 1930, during the government of Iuliu Maniu, he served as Prefect of Argeș County; in 1930–1931, and again in 1932–1933, he represented the same area in the Assembly of Deputies. He took charge of the official response to the 1930 Costești wooden church fire, organizing humanitarian aid, burial of the victims, visits by dignitaries and coordination with the Romanian Orthodox Church, the army and the prosecutorial service. In 1940, from July 4 to September 4, he served as Minister of Army Procurement in the government of Ion Gigurtu.

Priboianu owned significant urban properties as well as land, part of which was expropriated during the 1945 land reform. Arrested by the communist regime in May 1950, he was sent to Sighet Prison, where he shared a cell for several months with Ion Nistor, Gheorghe Cipăianu, Dumitru Caracostea, general Ioan Mihail Racoviță, Radu Portocală, Sebastian Bornemisa, Dimitrie Burileanu, general Ioan Popovici, Gheorghe Tașcă, and Ion Pelivan. After being released from Sighet Prison in July 1955, Priboianu was taken to the Malmaison barracks for questioning before being obliged to live on the Bărăgan Plain.
