= Călinești, Teleorman =

Călinești
- Commune
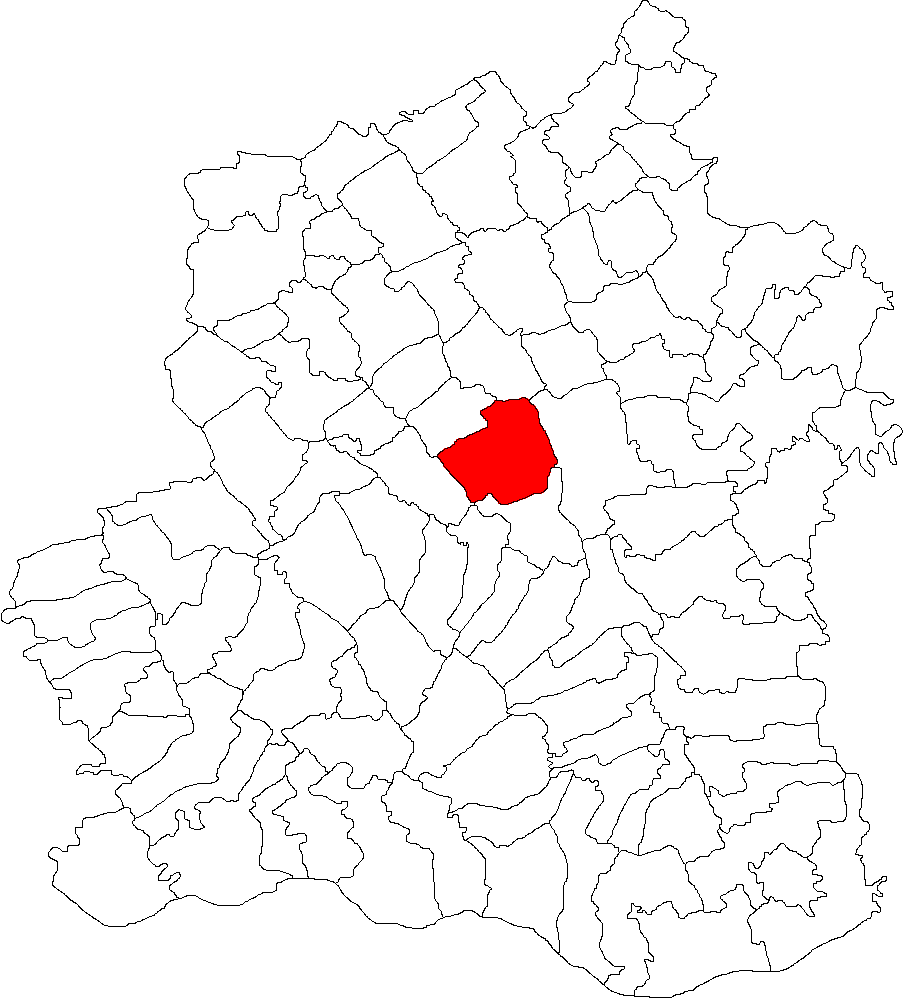
- Location in Teleorman County

- Location in Romania
- Coordinates: 44°05′N 25°14′E
- Country: Romania
- County: Teleorman
- Subdivisions: Antonești, Călinești, Copăceanca, Licuriciu, Marița
- Population (2021-12-01): 2,779
- Time zone: EET/EEST (UTC+2/+3)
- Vehicle reg.: TR

Călinești (Romanian pronunciation: [kəliˈneʃtʲ]) is a commune in Teleorman County, Muntenia, Romania. It is composed of five villages: Antonești, Călinești, Copăceanca, Licuriciu, and Marița.

== Natives ==
- Victor Antonescu (1871–1947), politician, Minister of Justice, Finance, and Foreign Affairs
