= Ion Nistor =

Romanian historian and politician (1876–1962)

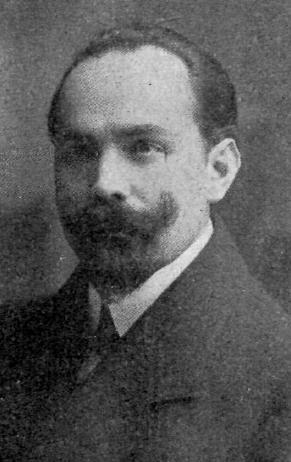

Minister of State for Bukovina
- In office 29 November 1918 – 2 May 1920
- Prime Minister: Ion I. C. Brătianu; Artur Văitoianu; Alexandru Vaida-Voevod; Alexandru Averescu
- Preceded by: Position established
- In office 19 January 1922 – 29 March 1926
- Prime Minister: Ion I. C. Brătianu

Minister of Public Works
- In office 22 June 1927 – 24 November 1927
- Prime Minister: Ion I. C. Brătianu
- Preceded by: Pantelimon Halippa
- In office 24 November 1927 – 9 November 1928
- Prime Minister: Vintilă I. C. Brătianu
- Succeeded by: Pantelimon Halippa

Minister of State (and Minister of Labor from 9 June)
- In office 5 January 1934 – 1 October 1934
- Prime Minister: Gheorghe Tătărăscu

Minister of Labor
- In office 2 October 1934 – 28 December 1937
- Prime Minister: Gheorghe Tătărăscu
- Preceded by: Ion Costinescu
- Succeeded by: Gheorghe A. Cuza

Minister of Religious Affairs and the Arts
- In office 24 November 1939 – 10 May 1940
- Prime Minister: Gheorghe Tătărăscu
- Preceded by: Nicolae Zigre
- Succeeded by: Ștefan Ciobanu

Personal details
- Born: August 16, 1876 Vicovu de Sus, Duchy of Bukovina, Austria-Hungary
- Died: November 11, 1962 (aged 86) Bucharest, Romanian People's Republic
- Party: National Liberal Party (Romania)
- Spouse: Virginia Pauliucu-Burlă
- Children: Oltea I. Nistor-Apostolescu
- Parents: Ilie Nistor (father); Maria Nistor (mother)
- Education: University of Vienna; University of Czernowitz; Leipzig University
- Occupation: Historian

Ion I. Nistor (Note: Romanian pronunciation: [iˈon ˈnistor]) (August 16, 1876 – November 11, 1962) was a Romanian historian and politician. He was a titular member of the Romanian Academy from 1915 and a professor at Cernăuți University and the University of Bucharest, while also serving as Minister of State for Bukovina, Minister of Public Works, Minister of Labor, and Minister of Religious Affairs and the Arts with a number of governments from 1918 to 1940.

== Biography ==
=== Early life and education ===
Nistor was born into a family of peasants in the Bivolărie hamlet of Vicovu de Sus, Bukovina; in Austria-Hungary at the time, it is now included in Suceava County, Romania. He studied at the local school in Vicovu de Sus, then in Rădăuți, first at the elementary school and then at the German High School, getting his Matura in 1897.

He then studied Philosophy and Literature at the University of Czernowitz and between 1898 and 1900, he completed his military service in the Austro-Hungarian Army, serving in Polei and in Vienna. He graduated from the university in 1902, after which he was named teacher of history and geography at the Suceava Classic High school. Together with some of his friends, Nistor edited a magazine titled Junimea Literară between 1904 and 1914, first published in Rădăuți and then in Suceava.

In 1904, Nistor married Virginia Pauliuc, daughter of Gheorghe Pauliuc, a Romanian Orthodox priest from Burla; one year later, on July 5, 1905, Oltea, his only child, was born. He then moved to teach at the Orthodox High School, making use of the institution's library, better suited to his studies into the history of Moldavia.

From 1908 to 1909 and from 1910 to 1911, he studied at the University of Vienna and completed his Ph.D. under Konstantin Josef Jireček, with a thesis on Moldavia's aspirations regarding Pokuttya. After that, he furthered his studies at the Ludwig-Maximilians-Universität München, Leipzig University, and the Friedrich Wilhelm University of Berlin, receiving in 1911 his Docent title and the Venia legendi; this allowed him to teach at the University of Vienna, where he gave lectures on the history of the Romanians.

=== Career ===
A year later, in 1912, Nistor moved to Czernowitz, to hold the chair of Southeastern European history, but after the start of World War I, he moved to the Romanian Old Kingdom, where he published various studies on the history of Bukovina. He was elected a member of the Romanian Academy in 1915. He also authored an ethnographic map of Bukovina under Austrian domination (see Cisleithania), based on the census of 1910.

Living in Iași by the time Romania entered the war on the Entente side, Nistor left Romania at the climax of the Romanian Campaign, when troops of the Central Powers threatened the region. In July 1917, he moved to Odessa, in territory held by the Russian Provisional Government, and began teaching Romanian history to the (mostly Bessarabian) students at the University of Novorossiya. He interrupted the course in November 1917, after a group of armed Russian revolutionaries broke into the university building. Nistor was, however, safely escorted outside by some of the Bessarabian soldiers who were part of his audience.

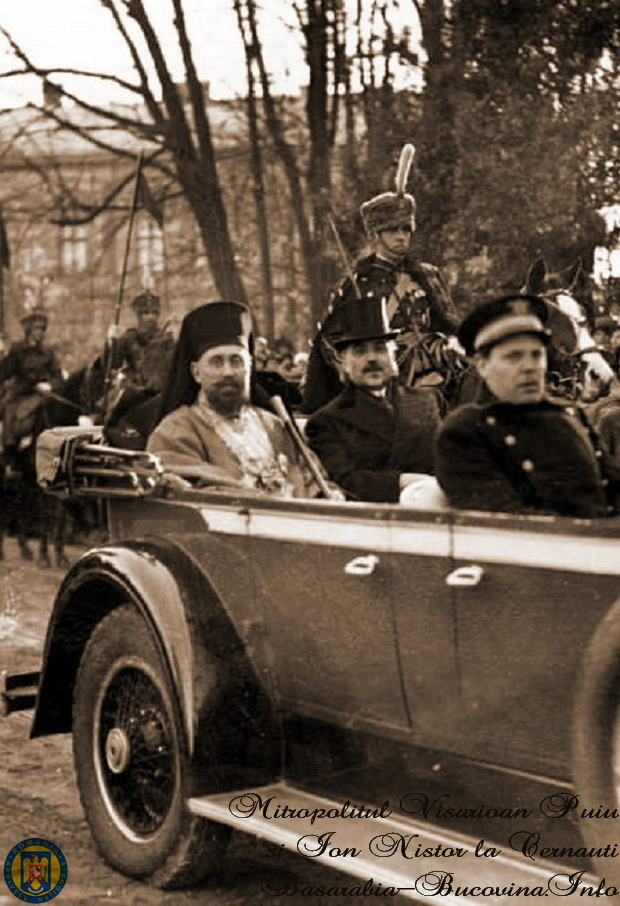
Visarion Puiu and Nistor in Cernăuți, 1918

In February 1918, together with other Austro-Hungarian refugees (including Octavian Goga), Nistor departed for Ovidiopol, Cetatea Albă, and then finally reached Chișinău. He stayed in the city, where he argued for the founding of a Moldavian University, and soon began lecturing on the History of the Romanians. He used the data gathered from the Chișinău Archives to write the History of Bessarabia, published in 1923. Nistor also witnessed the Sfatul Țării session which voted the union with Romania.

After the war ended, he returned to his native Bukovina and was one of the members of the National Assembly of Bukovina in Cernăuți who voted for the union with Romania on November 28, 1918. Nistor was also one of the fifteen Bukovinians who presented the Union Act to Romania's King Ferdinand I.

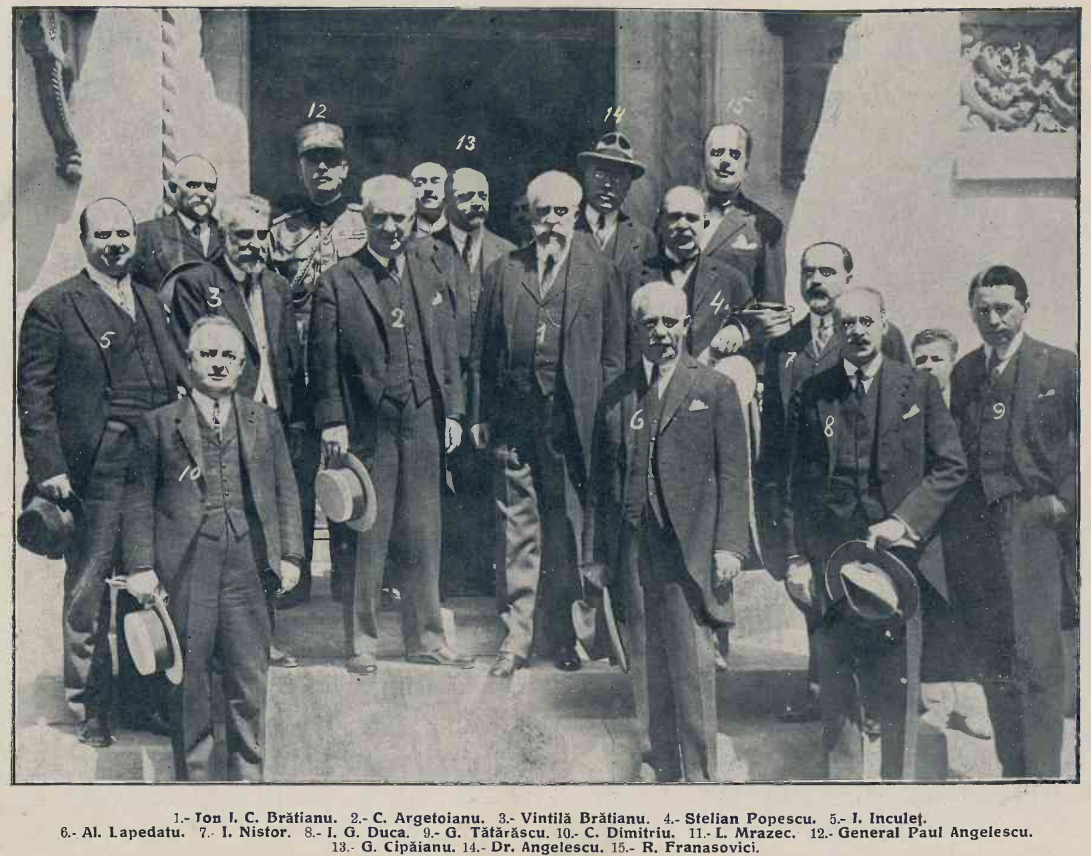
Members of the Seventh Ion I. C. Brătianu cabinet, 1927; Nistor is third from the right

Nistor presided upon the Democratic Union Party, which had a centralist agenda. Between December 18, 1918 and May 2, 1919, he was a member of Greater Romania's Ion I. C. Brătianu government, as a Minister for Bukovina, and, between February 14 and February 27, also held the rank of minister for Bessarabia, while the nominal minister was delegated to the Paris Peace Conference. Between May 1920 and January 1922, Nistor was a Senator in the Parliament of Romania.

In the interwar period, Nistor wrote many historical works, including The Origin of Romanians and the Vlachs of Thessalia and Epirus and The History of Romanians in Transnistria (1925). He was also the director of the historical magazine Codrii Cosminului, which was published between 1924 and 1939.

Elected rector of the University of Cernăuți in 1920, serving as such until 1921, and again from 1933 to 1940. Also in 1920, he joined the National Liberal Party (PNL), and was again the Minister of State for Bukovina in the Sixth Ion I. C. Brătianu cabinet (1922–1926), Minister of Public Works in the Vintilă I. C. Brătianu cabinet (1927–1928), Minister of State and then Labour in the First Tătărăscu cabinet (1934), and Minister of Labour in the Second Tătărăscu cabinet (1934–1935). In 1938, he broke with the PNL and sided with the National Renaissance Front regime established by King Carol II, and was Minister of Religious Affairs and the Arts in the Fifth Tătărăscu cabinet (November 24, 1939 – May 10, 1940). As a politician, he strongly opposed communism, social democracy and fascism.

Starting October 1940, under the National Legionary State, Nistor taught at the University of Bucharest, becoming the target of Iron Guard persecutions for the support he had given to King Carol. Following the Guard's defeat during the Legionnaires' Rebellion of 1941, he sent a congratulatory telegram to Conducător Ion Antonescu. He was pensioned in the same year, and, starting 1943, he was in charge of the Library of the Romanian Academy. Nistor kept the latter office until after the establishment of the Communist regime, when the purge of anti-communists in the Academy began (1948).

=== Last years ===
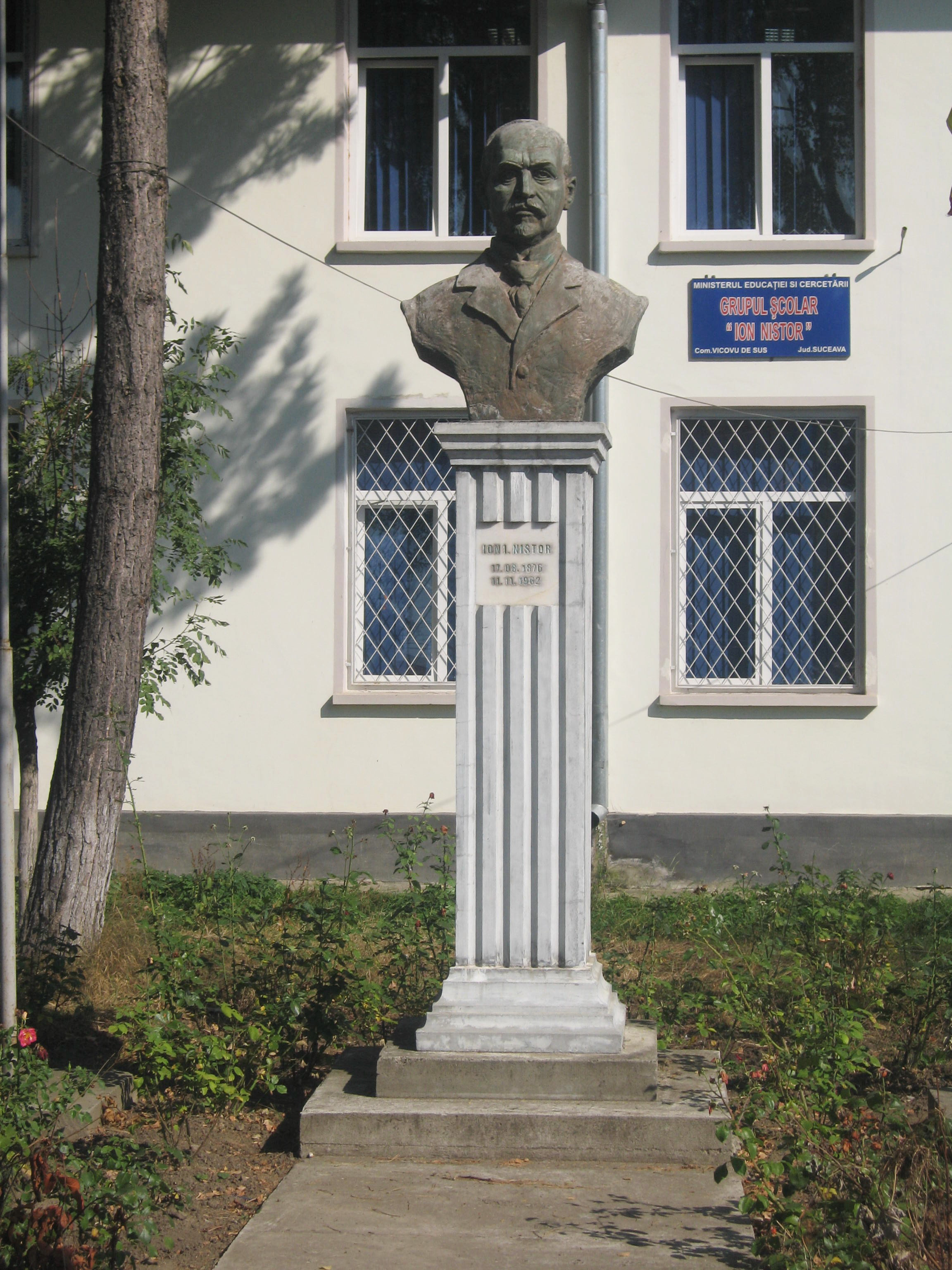
Bust of Nistor in Vicovu de Sus

His house was nationalized, and Nistor had to live in the attic of his daughter's house, which was also nationalized. On the night of May 5/6, 1950, Nistor was arrested for political reasons by the Securitate, and was incarcerated in the notorious Sighet Prison. For several months, he shared a cell with Gheorghe Cipăianu, Dumitru Caracostea, general Ioan Mihail Racoviță, Radu Portocală, Mihail Priboianu, Sebastian Bornemisa, Dimitrie Burileanu, general Ioan Popovici, Gheorghe Tașcă, and Ion Pelivan. Originally sentenced to 24 months in prison, his sentence was subsequently raised to 60 months.

He was freed five years and two months later. After that, he continued writing, completing his works, History of Bukovina and The History of Romanians. Nistor died in Bucharest in November 1962. Some 300 people, mostly Bukovinians and ex-members of the Liberal Party, came to pay respects at his funeral; the religious ceremony was officiated by Nifon Criveanu, previously the metropolitan bishop of Oltenia.

== Legacy ==
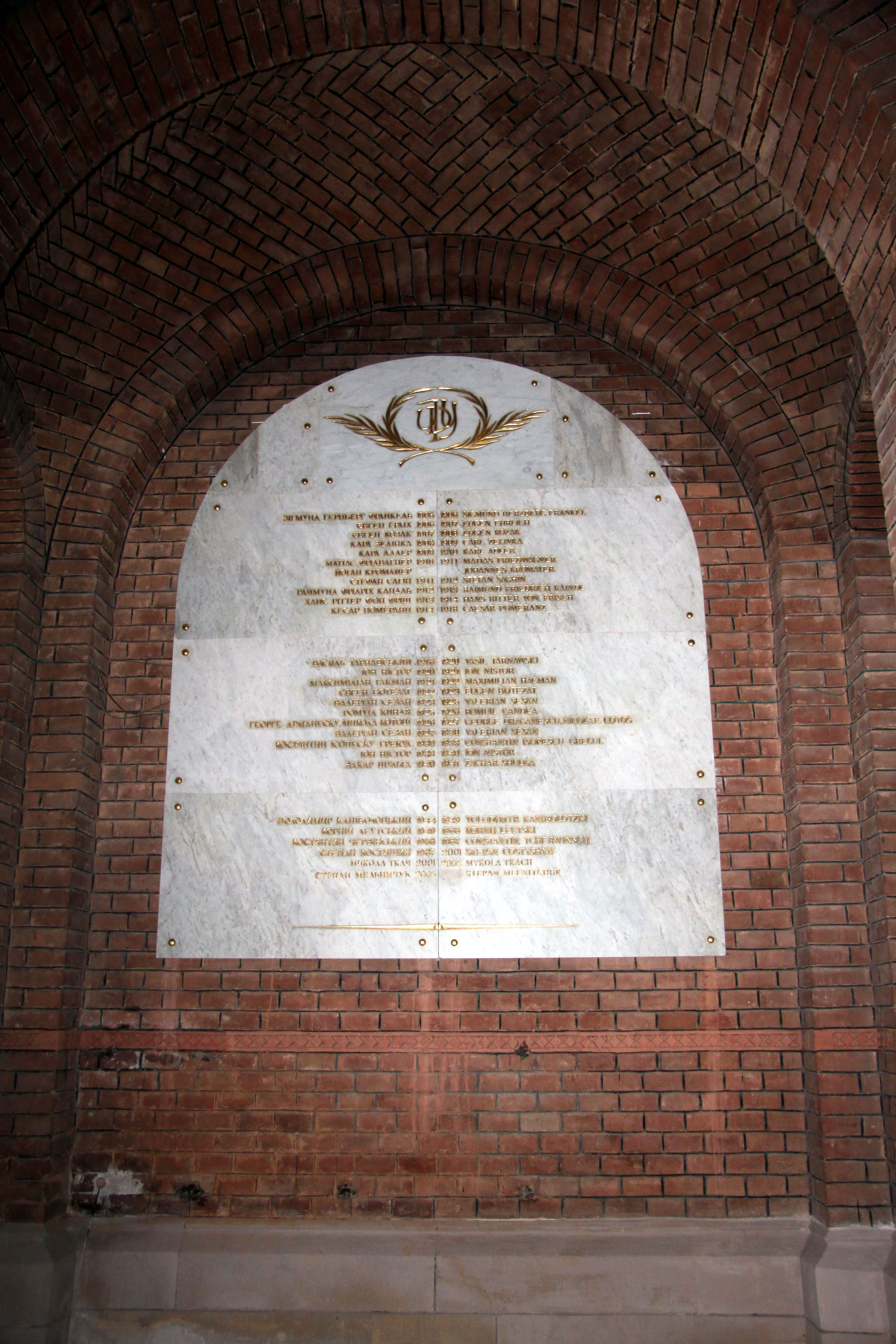
Plaque dedicated to the rectors of the University of Chernivtsi, also mentioning Ion Nistor

There are streets in Bucharest (Sector 3), Chișinău, Iași, Rădăuți, and Suceava that are named after Nistor. In his native town, Vicovu de Sus, there is a technological high school named after him, as well as a bust of him, which was unveiled in 2002.
