= Ernest Urdărianu =

Confidant of King Carol II of Romania

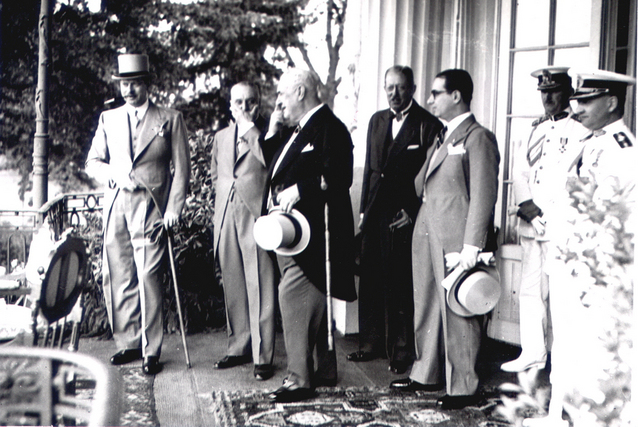
Urdăreanu (fifth person from left to right) in the company of King Carol II and Jockey Club President Constantin Argetoianu (1939)

Ernest Urdărianu (1897–1985), (largely known as "Urdăreanu", but this is incorrect) was the Minister of the Court during the reign of King Carol II of Romania (1930–1940). As closest confidant of the King Urdăreanu was, alongside Madame Lupescu, the King's mistress, the third member of the triumvirate which held virtually all power in the state during the 1930s. It is alleged that he was, after the King, the most powerful and the most hated man in Romania. Following the abdication of the King in 1940, Urdăreanu left the country together with him and Madame Lupescu to seek asylum and he stayed with them for the rest of his life.

== Early years ==
Urdăreanu's grandfather was a boyar, Gheorghe Urdăreanu; he would later try to claim more prestigious aristocratic origins. His father, Pandelie Urdăreanu (1858-1902), was an Infantry officer. Urdăreanu also received military training. Through his mother, he was cousin to Nicolae Titulescu. He had a brother, Gheorghe, who was an engineer and businessman, and a sister, Lelia, who was a painter. He was a skilled car driver and was interested in motor sports. In 1928 and 1929 he won the first and second Rally of San Remo, on Fiat cars.

Originally a cavalry officer, he fought in the First World War and served during the 20s in the Royal Mounted Regiment. Urdăreanu came in 1931 into the service of the King as an aide at the palace, advocated by Romania's Minister in London, Nicolae Titulescu, who allegedly was a relative of his. He then became head of the palace garage and the regular chauffeur of Madame Lupescu. In 1933 he was appointed private secretary of the King, after a conflict between the King and Constantin ‘Puiu’ Dimitrescu, who had been the King's secretary and ‘watchdog’ from the time of their asylum in France in the late twenties. In 1936 Urdăreanu was promoted to vice-marshal of the palace and a year later marshal of the palace, or head of the royal household.

== The Camarilla ==
Urdăreanu was part of the so-called camarilla around the King, which consisted of the King's mistress Elena ('Magda') Lupescu, the wealthy industrialists Nicolae Malaxa, Max Auschnitt, Aristide Blank and others. This camarilla, partly Jewish (Auschnitt, Blank and Lupescu), attracted much hatred in Romania because of its members' decadent lifestyle and of their corruption.

Urdăreanu owed his strong position not to any special skills or capacities, but to the unlimited trust of the King and of Madame Lupescu. Contemporaries called him shrewd, sly, slick, resentful and corrupt. In the palace he decided who had access to the King and for what purposes. It was alleged that people who wanted to speak to the King first had to pay Urdăreanu to get access. Urdăreanu also had a decisive vote on political appointments. He is quoted to have boasted: ‘Madame Lupescu controls the King, but I control Madame Lupescu, so I control Romania’. There were also rumours that Urdăreanu and Lupescu were lovers.

== Royal Minister ==
Urdăreanu was not only an influential adviser to the King, from 1938 until the end of the reign on September 6, 1940, he was as Minister of the Court the representative of the King in the government. In that capacity he was member of the Crown Council, which made decisions during moments of severe crises – for instance the forced cession of Bessarabia and northern Bukovina in June 1940 and Northern Transylvania in August 1940. According to King Carol II's diary, Urdăreanu voted, on 28 June 1940 in the Crown Council, against the cession of Bessarabia to the Soviet Union, no doubt on orders from the King.

In 1938 Urdăreanu accompanied King Carol and Crown Prince Michael on their state visit to the United Kingdom, and afterwards on their visit to the French Government in Paris and Adolf Hitler at Berchtesgaden, although Urdăreanu was not received by the Führer. Urdăreanu served regularly to solve difficult tasks for the King. In February 1939, on occasion of the King's conflict with the historian Nicolae Iorga concerning the King's political party, the National Renaissance Front (FRN) which was vehemently opposed by Iorga, Urdăreanu was dispatched to the University of Bucharest to stop Iorga from publicizing his criticism. At the beginning of 1940 Urdăreanu also acted as a representative of the King to reach a settlement with the Fascist Iron Guard.

As the King's man Urdăreanu had a seat on the boards of numerous companies in which Carol II had financial interests. It is generally believed that Urdăreanu was helping the King to transfer large sums of money out of the country and to foreign banks, and that he did not neglect his own financial benefit in the process.

== Exile ==
When King Carol II and Madame Lupescu were forced to leave the country after the King's abdication on 6 September 1940, Urdăreanu accompanied them on their adventurous flight from the country during which the royal train was hounded and shot at by members of the Iron Guard. First they went to Switzerland and afterwards to Spain, where they stayed in Barcelona, Madrid, and Seville. Due to constant pressure from the German and Romanian governments for the extradition of Lupescu and Urdăreanu, on account of their suspected crimes and corruption, in March 1941 Urdăreanu organised their flight to Portugal.

After a brief stay in Portugal, King Carol II, Lupescu and Urdăreanu sought asylum further, first in Cuba, afterwards in Mexico and Brazil. A long-time bachelor, Urdăreanu himself married in 1944 in Mexico the 18 year old Monique Cook. He organized in 1947 in Brazil the marriage of King Carol II to Elena Lupescu.

In 1949 all four returned to Portugal, where they set up a household in Estoril, with Urdăreanu still as secretary and chamberlain of the King. After the unexpected death of King Carol II in 1953, Urdăreanu organized the funeral in Lisbon, which was not attended by his son, the king Michael I, partly because the latter didn't want to meet Lupescu and Urdăreanu. Michael, who detested Urdăreanu, used to call him ‘Murdăreanu’ (‘murdărie’ meaning dirt).

After King Carol II's death, Urdăreanu and his wife stayed with Madame Lupescu until her death in 1977. Urdăreanu later died in Portugal in 1985, at 88, never returning to Romania. He, his wife, and her sister are buried in the British Cemetery in Lisbon.
