= Victor Slăvescu =

Romanian economist and politician

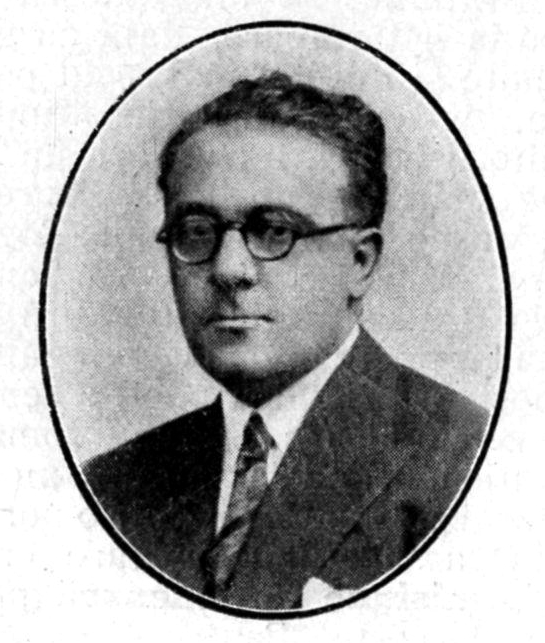

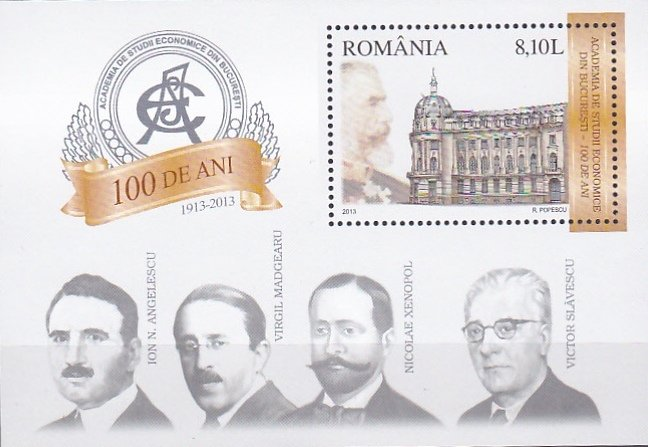
Romanian stamp issued in 2013, on the 100th anniversary of the Bucharest Academy of Economic Studies. Slăvescu is at the bottom right.

Victor Slăvescu (5 June [O.S. 23 May] 1891 – 24 September 1977) was a Romanian economist and politician. He was a professor of economics at the Bucharest Academy of Economic Studies and a titular member of the Romanian Academy. He also served as Finance Minister (1934–1935) and Minister of Materiel (1939–1940).

== Biography ==
He was born in Rucăr, Muscel County (now in Argeș County); his father, Ion Slăvescu, was a colonel in the Romanian Army. He attended primary school in Slatina, then studied at the Ion C. Brătianu High School in Pitești from 1902 to 1908, and at the Gheorghe Lazăr High School in Bucharest from 1908 to 1910. After taking his Baccalaureate, he left for France in 1911 and enrolled at the University of Paris, where he took courses with Pierre Paul Leroy-Beaulieu, Charles Gide, and Charles Rist. He then went to the University of Göttingen in Germany to study philosophy. The next year he switched to the Ludwig-Maximilians-Universität München to study economics, and in 1913, he went to Halle University, from where he earned a Ph.D. in Economics in 1914. His dissertation, titled "Die Agrarfrage in Rumänien", was written under the direction of Johanes Conrad.

After returning to Bucharest, Slăvescu worked as a clerk for the Banca Românească bank. When Romania entered World War I in 1916, he volunteered as officer in the army. Wounded near Brașov, he spent six months in a hospital to recover, and then went back to the front in Moldavia. In Iași, he met Dimitrie Gusti, Virgil Madgearu, and Ion Răducanu; with the last two he founded the magazine "Independența economică". In 1918, he returned to work for Banca Românească and for the next three years travelled to Bessarabia, Bukovina, and Transylvania to study the economic and banking issues in those regions. From 1925 to 1947, Slăvescu was a professor at the Bucharest Academy of Economic Studies.

He served as Finance Minister in the First Tătărăscu cabinet (January 5–October 1, 1934) and the Second Tătărăscu cabinet (October 1, 1934–February 1, 1935). He later served as Minister of Materiel in the Third Cristea cabinet (February 1–March 6, 1939), the Călinescu cabinet (March 6–September 21, 1939), the Argeșanu cabinet (September 21–28, 1939), the Argetoianu cabinet (September 28–November 23, 1939), the Fifth Tătărăscu cabinet (November 24, 1939–May 10, 1940), and the Sixth Tătărăscu cabinet (May 10–July 3, 1940).

He was elected a titular member of the Romanian Academy in 1939, and stripped of membership by the new communist regime in 1948.

The Romania Academy now sponsors the "Victor Slăvescu Center for Financial and Monetary Studies", located in Bucharest. A street in Pitești is named after him, and so are high schools in Ploiești and Rucăr.
