= Škoda Affair =

Romanian controversy

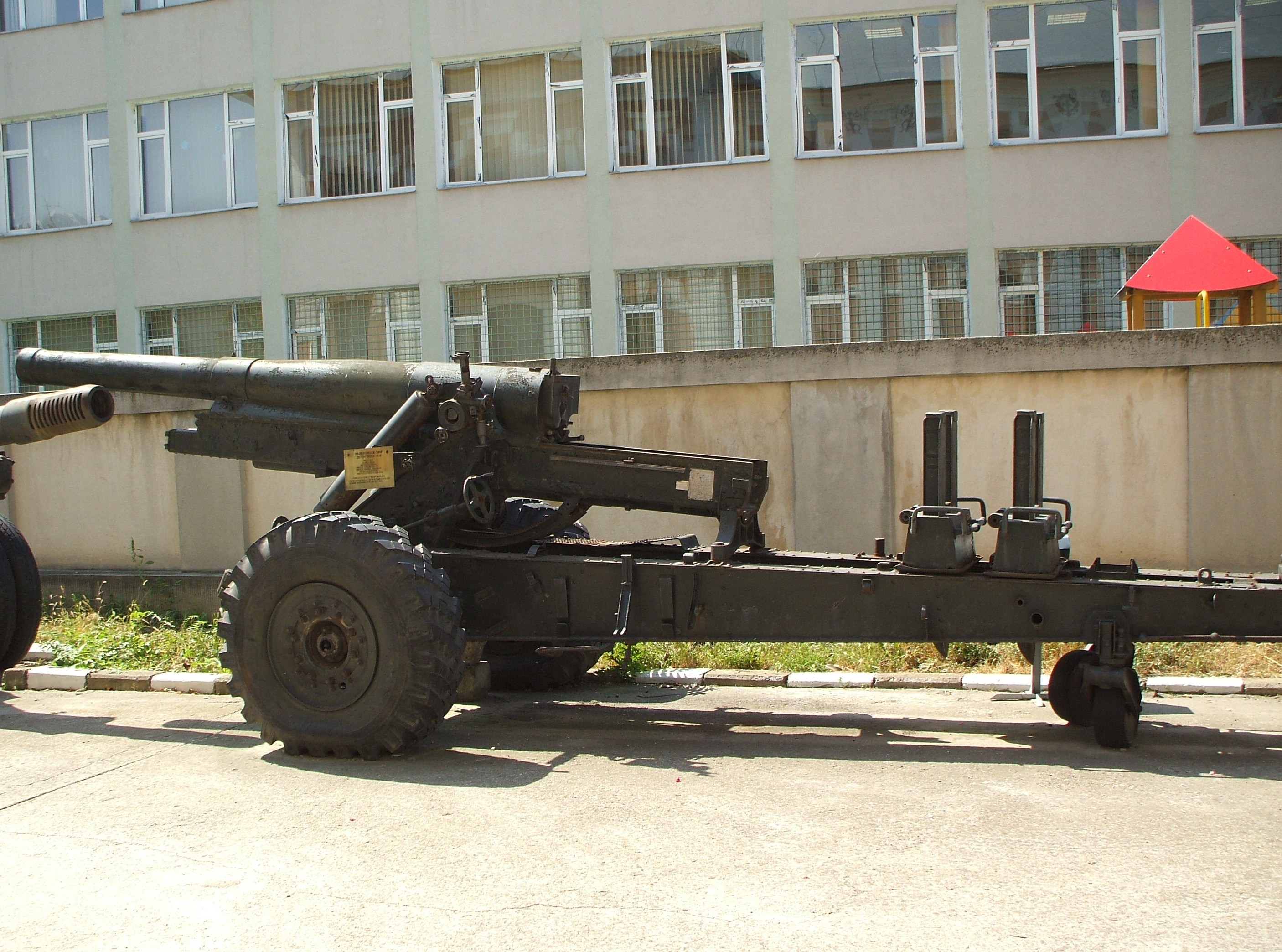
Škoda 149 mm K1 howitzer

The Škoda Affair (Romanian: Afacerea Škoda) is the name under which the press brought to the attention of the public one of the most famous trials in Romania during the interwar period, concerning a business in which fraud and corruption reached unimaginable heights, to the detriment of the Romanian State and the ordinary taxpayer.

The Škoda Affair was established in the context of military orders placed by Romania abroad, in order to equip the Romanian Army, an opportunity used by some Romanian politicians to accept, without scruples, price inflation, for their personal benefit, thus undermining the interests of the country.
