= Ioan Ilcuș =

Romanian general and minister of war

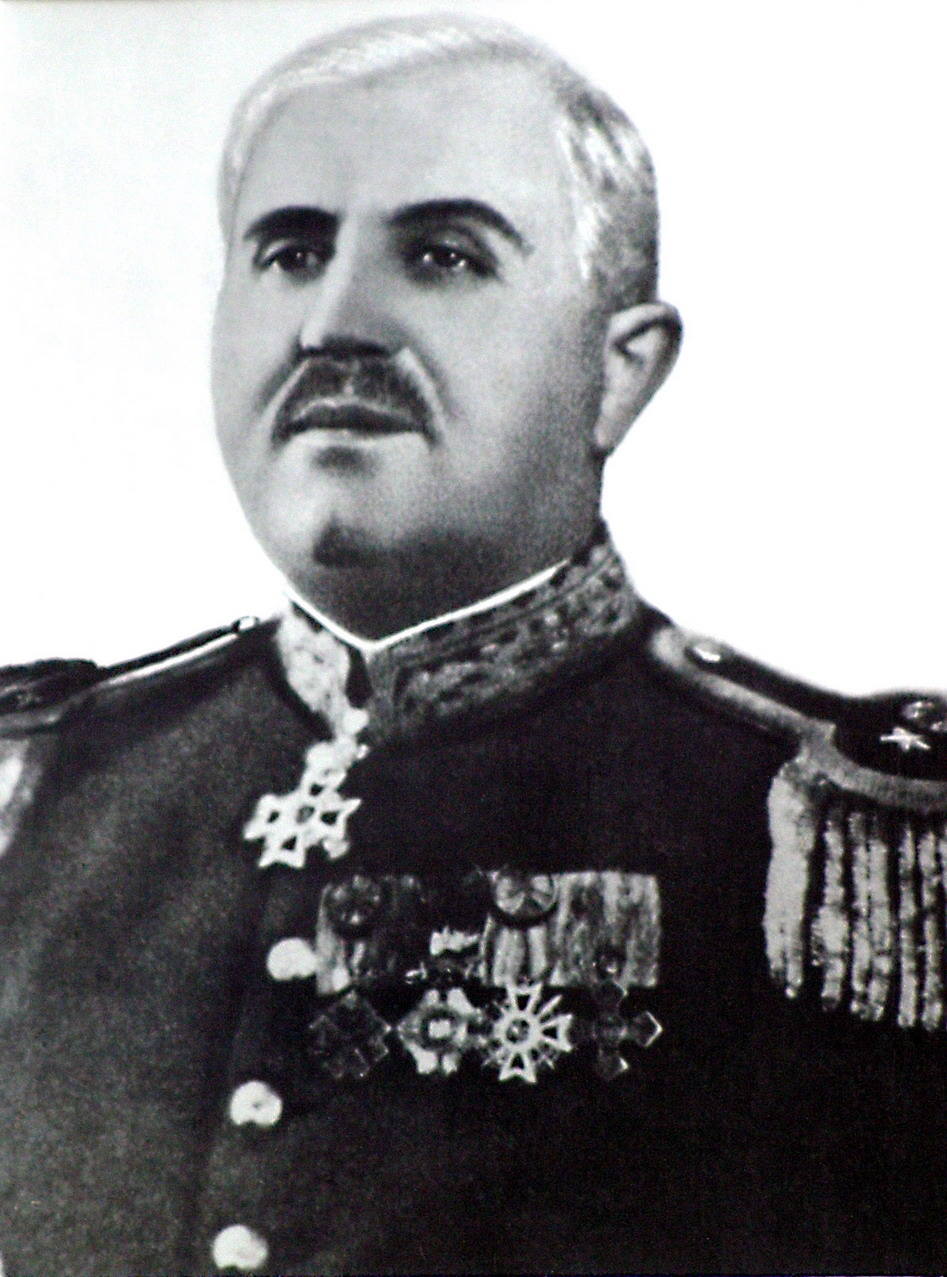

Minister of War of Romania
- In office 21 September 1939 – 4 July 1940
- Prime Minister: Gheorghe Argeșanu; Constantin Argetoianu; Gheorghe Tătărăscu
- Preceded by: Armand Călinescu
- Succeeded by: Constantin Nicolescu

Personal details
- Born: February 22, 1882 Rășinari, Austria-Hungary
- Died: March 31, 1977 (aged 95) Bucharest, Socialist Republic of Romania
- Resting place: Rășinari, Sibiu County, Romania
- Education: Theresian Military Academy; Higher War School
- Awards: Order of the Crown of Romania, Grand Cross class

Military service
- Allegiance: Kingdom of Romania
- Branch/service: Romanian Land Forces
- Years of service: 1916–1944
- Rank: Lieutenant General
- Battles/wars: World War I

Ioan Ilcuș (February 22, 1882 – March 31, 1977) was a Romanian general, who served as minister of war in 1939–1940.

== Biography ==
He was born on February 22, 1882, in the village of Rășinari (at the time in Austria-Hungary, now in Sibiu County), as the son of the peasant Șerban Ilcuș (1855–1944) and his wife, Paraschiva (1864–1937). He pursued military studies at the Theresian Military Academy in Vienna, becoming a sub-lieutenant in 1902 and graduating in 1904. He was an officer in the Austro-Hungarian army, advancing in rank to lieutenant and then captain. On April 1, 1916, he moved to Romania, where he was incorporated into the Romanian Army with the rank of major and served in World War I. He became lieutenant colonel on September 1, 1917.

Ilcuș participated as a delegate of the Romanian legion from Sibiu County at the Great National Assembly of Alba Iulia on December 1, 1918, while his father was a delegate of the meeting of Romanian craftsmen in Rășinari. He then graduated from the Higher War School. He was promoted to colonel in 1920, brigadier general in 1931, and major general in 1937.

He was Secretary General of the Ministry of Defense (1932–1933). As a general in the Royal Army, he served as chief of staff and then as commander of the Romanian 4th Army (September 19–22, 1939). From September 21, 1939 to July 4, 1940 he served as Minister of Defense in the cabinets of Gheorghe Argeșanu, Constantin Argetoianu, and Gheorghe Tătărăscu. Ilcuș was promoted to the rank of lieutenant general effective June 6, 1940, and was awarded the Order of the Crown of Romania, Grand Cross class. The promotion was withdrawn by decree-law no. 3,094 of September 9, 1940 of General Ion Antonescu, head of the Romanian State, together with several generals considered to be close to the former King Carol II and accused of, as high military commanders, to have behaved inappropriately in the dramatic circumstances of the summer of 1940. The decree-law provided for the removal of several generals from the active ranks of the army with the following justification: "considering that the following general officers have committed serious acts of incapacity, demoralizing by their deed the prestige of the army and the elementary commandments of the soldier's responsibility. Considering that by flattery and methods incompatible with soldierly dignity they occupied high commands, then encouraging frivolity and lack of officer dignity; Considering that the incapacity of these general officers led to the decay of the army and to serious acts through the loss of borders; Considering that the Nation must receive the example of duty and responsibility by sanctioning those who were guilty of these violations". As a result, Ilcuș's pay was reduced in half.

He had a forced residence during Antonescu's regime. The effects of the decree-law were canceled on September 1, 1944, after the coup d'état of August 23, 1944, and General Ilcuș was reinstated in his rights starting from the date of his retirement. By another decree of September 1, 1944, however, he was placed in reserve for the age limit, starting on February 2, 1943.

=== Detention and death ===
He lived for a while in his native village Rășinari, in a house on Popilor Street no. 1314. On April 20, 1953, he was arrested by the security authorities in Bucharest. He was transferred on August 3, 1954, to Sighet Prison, where he was detained for seven years, during which he suffered from liver and kidney diseases. During the detention in Sighet, Ilcuș was, for a while, a cellmate with the Greek-Catholic bishop Alexandru Todea. Ioan Ilcuș died in Bucharest at age 95, and was buried in his native village.

He was married to Maria, with whom he had a son, Ionel Horia Ilcuș.
