= Richard Franasovici =

Romanian politician (1883–1964)

Minister of Public Works and Communications
- In office 14 November 1933 – 29 December 1933
- Prime Minister: Ion G. Duca
- Preceded by: Eduard Mirto
- In office 29 November 1933 – 3 January 1934
- Prime Minister: Constantin Angelescu
- In office 3 January 1934 – 14 November 1937
- Prime Minister: Gheorghe Tătărăscu
- Succeeded by: Ion Inculeț

Minister of Internal Affairs
- In office 17 November 1937 – 28 December 1937
- Prime Minister: Gheorghe Tătărescu
- Preceded by: Gheorghe Tătărescu
- Succeeded by: Armand Călinescu

Personal details
- Born: April 8, 1883 Turnu Severin, Kingdom of Romania
- Died: August 24, 1964 (aged 81) Paris, France
- Citizenship: Austria; Romania
- Party: Conservative Party; Conservative-Democratic Party; National Liberal Party
- Education: University of Bucharest
- Occupation: Lawyer

Richard Franasovici (April 8, 1883 – July 24, 1964) was a Romanian politician.

Born in Turnu Severin, his family was of Aromanian descent. They had settled in the town around 1830, but kept Austrian citizenship until 1906. Another account suggests the family were Serbs who had settled in the Banat. After attending primary school in his native city, Franasovici went to Saint Sava National College in Bucharest, graduating in 1900. He graduated from the law faculty of the University of Bucharest in 1904. The following year, he was named judge's assistant for the Balș district. In 1906, he became a lawyer at the Turnu Severin city hall, as well as state's attorney for Mehedinți County.

Initially a member of the Conservative Party, he defected to Take Ionescu’s new Conservative-Democratic Party in 1908. He served as an officer in World War I. After the war, he entered the National Liberal Party (PNL) as part of its younger wing, opposed to the Brătianu family’s domination. Franasovici was first elected to the Chamber of Deputies in 1919.

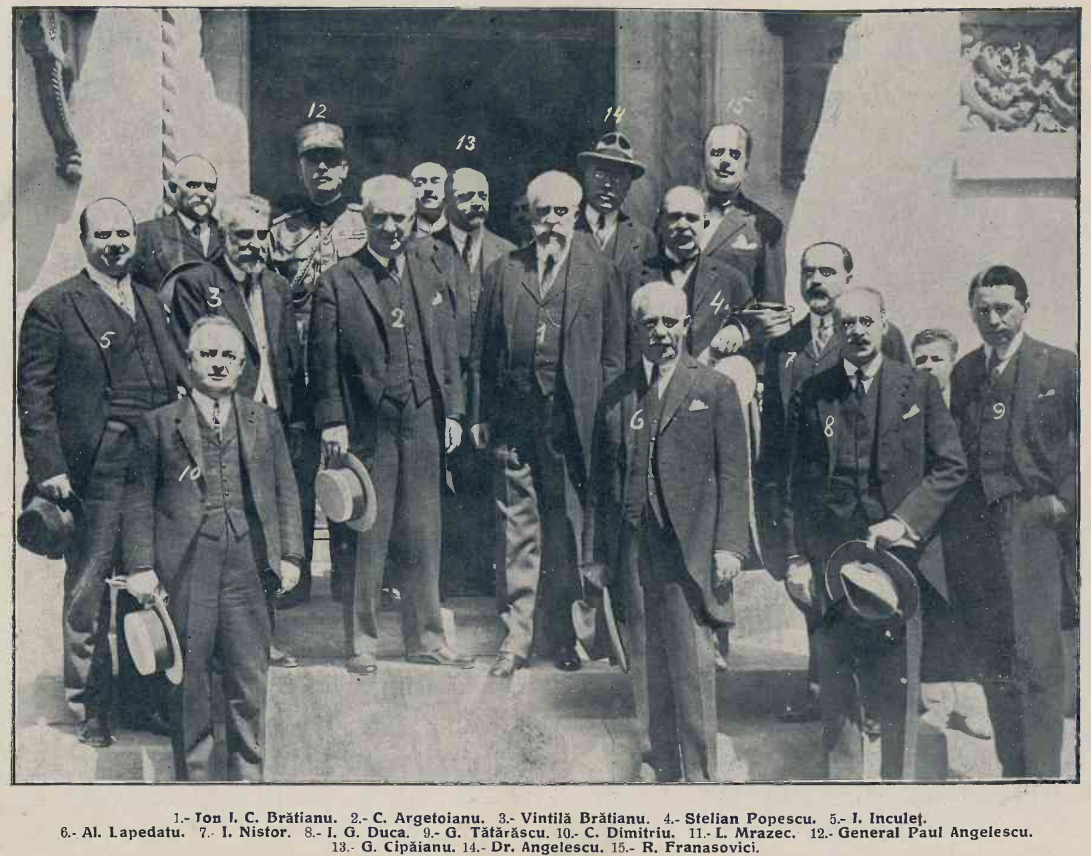
Members of the Seventh Ion I. C. Brătianu cabinet; Franasovici is on the top right

In 1922, Franasovici was named general secretary in the Interior Ministry. He was undersecretary of state in 1923–1924 and 1927–1928. In the early 1930s, King Carol II exacerbated divisions within the PNL by encouraging a faction led by Gheorghe Tătărescu, Ion Inculeț and Franasovici, who saw a chance to depose Vintilă Brătianu and achieve power.

He was Minister of Public Works from November 1933 to November 1937. In January 1934, after King Carol dismissed the cabinet of Constantin Angelescu, the young Liberals proposed Franasovici as Prime Minister. The king agreed, but Franasovici declined, claiming it would be inappropriate for the head of government to have received Romanian citizenship only as an adult. Instead, he proposed Tătărescu; the king accepted.

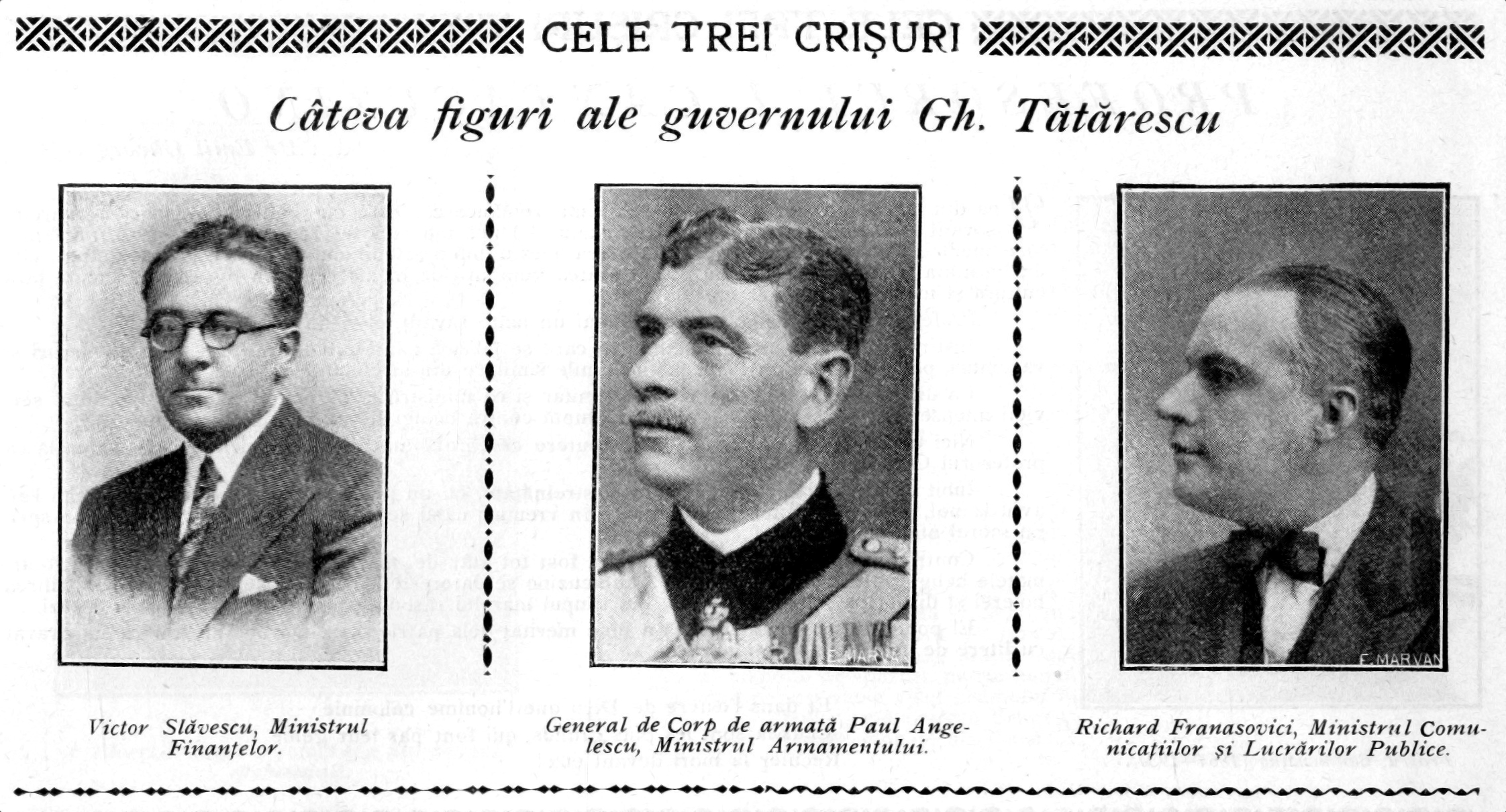
Franasovici (right) and two other members of the Fourth Tătărăscu cabinet

By 1937, Franasovici was a prominent member of the royal camarilla. That November, although Tătărescu had other candidates in mind, he was named Interior Minister upon the insistence of Dinu Brătianu. The appointment was seconded by camarilla colleague Gabriel Marinescu. The ministry traditionally grew in importance at election time, due to its repressive capabilities. At the time, an election was approaching. Franasovici was presented to the public as a choice who would guarantee the integrity of the vote. He had a conciliatory attitude, particularly toward the Iron Guard, whose reprisals he greatly feared.

During the campaign, the ministry used the police to block opposition activity, at times using teargas. Tătărescu lost the election, ending Franasovici's brief stint as Interior Minister. He then served as ambassador to Poland (1938–1939) and France (1939–1940). In July 1945, he became ambassador to Switzerland. The following February, he was sent to London as ambassador. He attended the Paris peace conference.

In November 1947, he resigned from the diplomatic service and went into exile. The following February, the new communist regime stripped him of his citizenship. He died in Paris.

Franasovici’s wife was named Mary. Her mother’s first husband, Mary's father, was one Filipescu; the mother later married Alexandru Văitoianu, a future general. Mary and Franasovici were married after World War I. According to the memoirs of Constantin Argetoianu, the young politician was motivated by the fact that he had no property, while she owned an estate at Râmnicu Sărat. He adds: "even before the marriage she was a slut, indeed a disgusting slut. She clung to Richard, creating a scene whenever he came to see her, yelled and managed to faint". Franasovici, whom he nicknames Richard Cœur de Cochon ("Richard the Pig-Heart"), would often go for advice to Alexandru Averescu. Once, Argetoianu was present when the two men were discussing Mary, who "was dying". The latter, a doctor, advised Franasovici to "give her a sound beating, sir, it'll pass right away". Upon hearing this advice, Mary got up and spat upon Argetoianu.
