= Ioan Popovici (brigadier general) =

Romanian general

Brigadier General Ioan Popovici
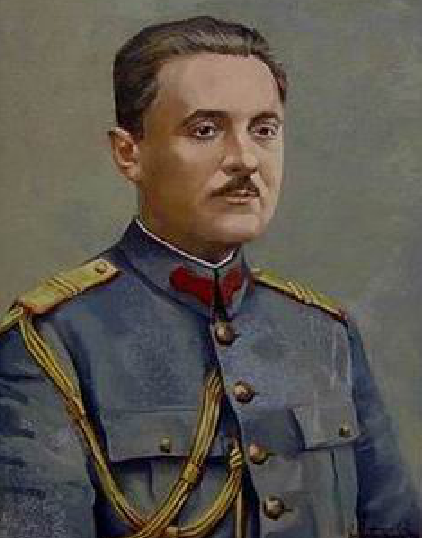
- Born: 23 August 1865
- Died: 1953 (aged 87–88); Sighet Prison, Sighetu Marmației, Romanian People's Republic
- Military career
- Allegiance: Kingdom of Romania
- Branch: Cavalry
- Rank: Sublieutenant (1887); Lieutenant (1890); Captain (1894); Major (1904); Lieutenant Colonel (1909); Colonel (1912); Brigadier General (1916)
- Nickname: "Epure"
- Conflicts: World War I

Ioan Popovici (23 August 1865 – 1953, in Sighet) was a Romanian general assigned to the general staff headquarters, during World War I. He attended the Școala Militară de Infanterie și Cavalerie (Military Infantry and Cavalry School) in Bucharest from 1885 to 1887. Afterward he rose through the ranks until he became a brigadier general in 1916 as World War I was raging, engulfing Romania. He was known as "Epure" to distinguish him from another Romanian general with the same name.

In World War I, he was assigned to the general staff at headquarters.

After the Communists took power in Romania, he was arrested in 1948 (at 83 years of age), ultimately dying in Sighet Prison in 1953.

== Bibliography ==
- Falkenhayn, Erich von, Campania Armatei a 9-a împotriva românilor și a rușilor, Atelierele Grafice Socec & Co S.A., București, 1937
- Kirițescu, Constantin, Istoria războiului pentru întregirea României, Editura Științifică și Enciclopedică, București, 1989
- Ioanițiu, Alexandru (1929). Războiul României: 1916-1918, vol. 1 (in Romanian). București: Tipografia Geniului.
- România în războiul mondial 1916-1919, Documente, Anexe, Volumul 1, Monitorul Oficial și Imprimeriile Statului, București, 1934
- Marele Cartier General al Armatei României. Documente 1916 – 1920, Editura Machiavelli, București, 1996
- Istoria militară a poporului român, vol. V, Editura Militară, București, 1989
- România în anii primului Război Mondial, Editura Militară, București, 1987
- România în primul război mondial, Editura Militară, 1979
