= Gheorghe Cipăianu =

Romanian politician (1878–1957)

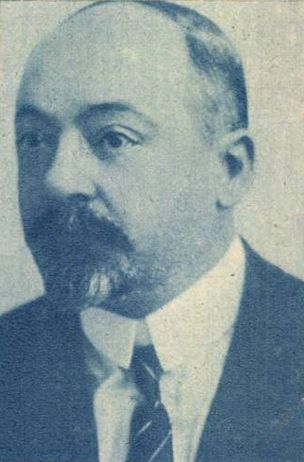
Gheorghe Cipăianu (1878–1957) was a Romanian agronomist, senator in the Romanian Parliament, undersecretary of state and Minister of Agriculture.

Gheorghe Cipăianu (3 November 1878–1957) was an Austro-Hungarian-born Romanian agronomist and politician.

He was born in Cipăieni (Keménytelke), a village east of the Transylvanian town of Turda, in Torda-Aranyos County, nowadays in Mureș County. Cipăianu attended high school in Blaj before leaving for Bucharest, capital of the Romanian Old Kingdom. There, he studied at the Herăstrău Agricultural School, finishing first in his class in 1899. He then studied at the agronomy institute in Leipzig, graduating in 1906, and obtained a doctorate from Leipzig University in 1909. His scientific research focused on the maize and sugar beet harvest. Entering government service in 1911 as a rural inspector for the Agriculture Ministry, he sat on the economic council in the War Ministry during World War I, from 1916 to 1917. In 1917–1918, he was prefect of Neamț County. He then re-entered the Agriculture Ministry, serving as general secretary from 1918 to 1919, a period that coincided with the union of Transylvania with Romania. From 1920 to 1922, he headed the central agency for cooperatives and land distribution, around the time of a major land reform. He was deputy state secretary in the ministry from 1923 to 1926, and again from 1927 to 1928.

A member of the National Liberal Party from 1910, he represented Târnava-Mică and Turda Counties in the Romanian Parliament on several occasions, as Senator from 1922 to 1926 and as Deputy in 1931 and 1933. From November 1933 to February 1934, he was Agriculture Minister in the cabinets of Ion G. Duca, Constantin Angelescu, and Gheorghe Tătărescu. In late 1944, he was part of the committee that prepared another land reform. In May 1950, early during the communist regime, Cipăianu was arrested. Sentenced to prison, he passed through Sighet penitentiary before being freed in 1955. He died two years later.

Cipăianu was a grand officer in the Order of the Star of Romania and the Order of the Crown.

== Writings ==
Cipăianu wrote several books, including

- Manual de agricultură. 1912.
- Introducerea sfeclei de zahăr pentru sămânță în România. 1908.
- Combaterea crizei agricole prin raționalizarea producției. 1931.
