= Victor Antonescu =

Romanian politician (1871–1947)

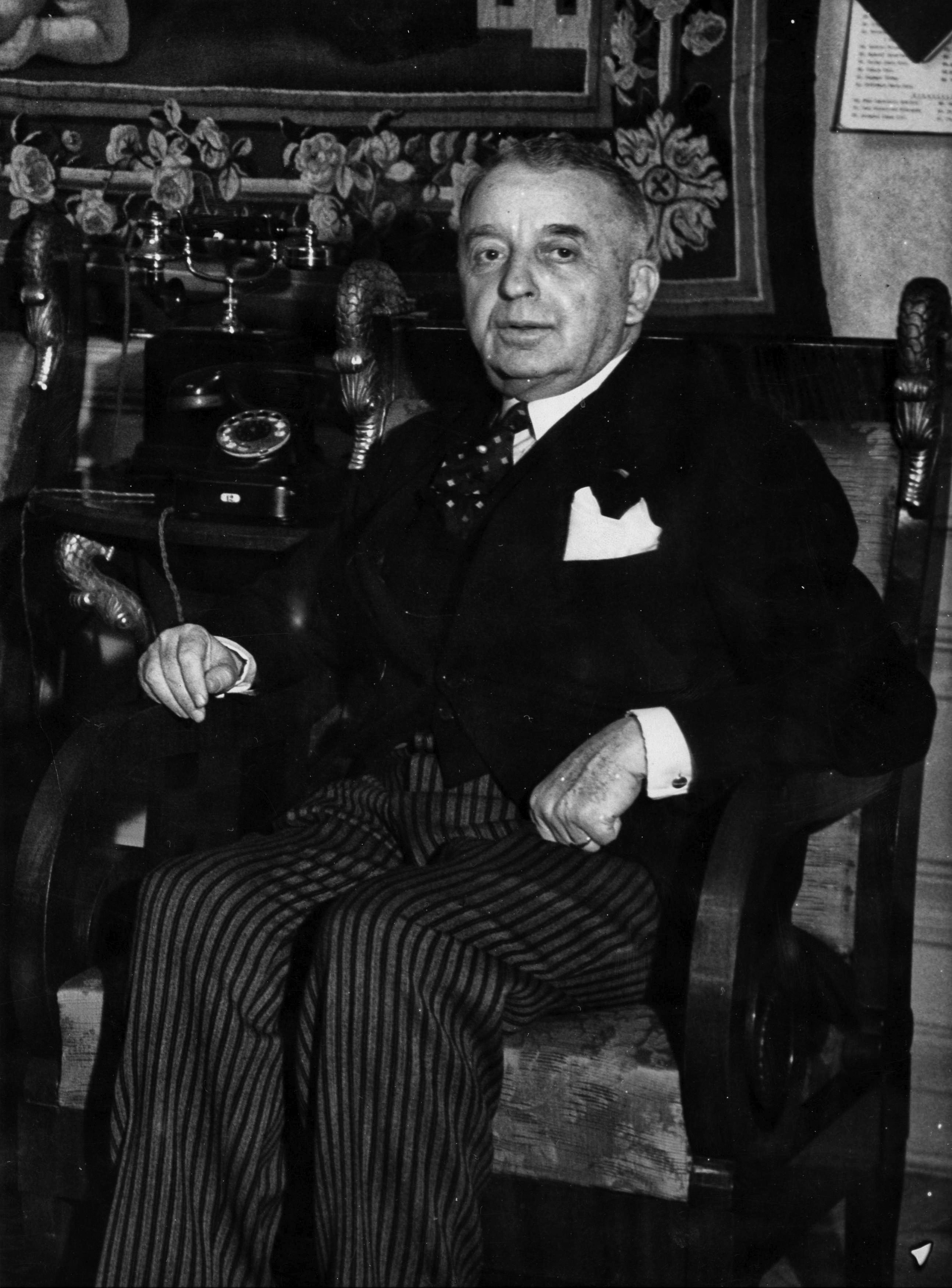

Minister of Foreign Affairs
- In office 29 August 1936 – 28 December 1937
- Monarch: Carol II
- Preceded by: Nicolae Titulescu
- Succeeded by: Istrate Micescu

Minister of Finance
- In office 1 February 1935 – 29 August 1936
- Monarch: Carol II
- Preceded by: Victor Slăvescu
- Succeeded by: Mircea Cancicov

Personal details
- Born: 3 September 1871 Antonești, Teleorman County, Romanian United Principalities
- Died: 22 August 1947 (aged 75) Bucharest, Kingdom of Romania
- Resting place: Vitănești, Teleorman County

Victor Antonescu (Romanian pronunciation: [ˈviktor antoˈnesku]; September 3, 1871, Antonești, Teleorman County – August 22, 1947, Bucharest) was a Romanian politician. He served as Minister of Justice from 4 January 1914 to 11 December 1916 and from 14 November 1933 to 1 February 1935, Minister of Finance between 1935 and 1936, and Minister of Foreign Affairs of Romania from 29 August 1936 until 28 December 1937. From 1922 to 1925 he represented the Romanian government in France.

In 1946, he was part of the Romanian delegation at the Paris Peace Conference.

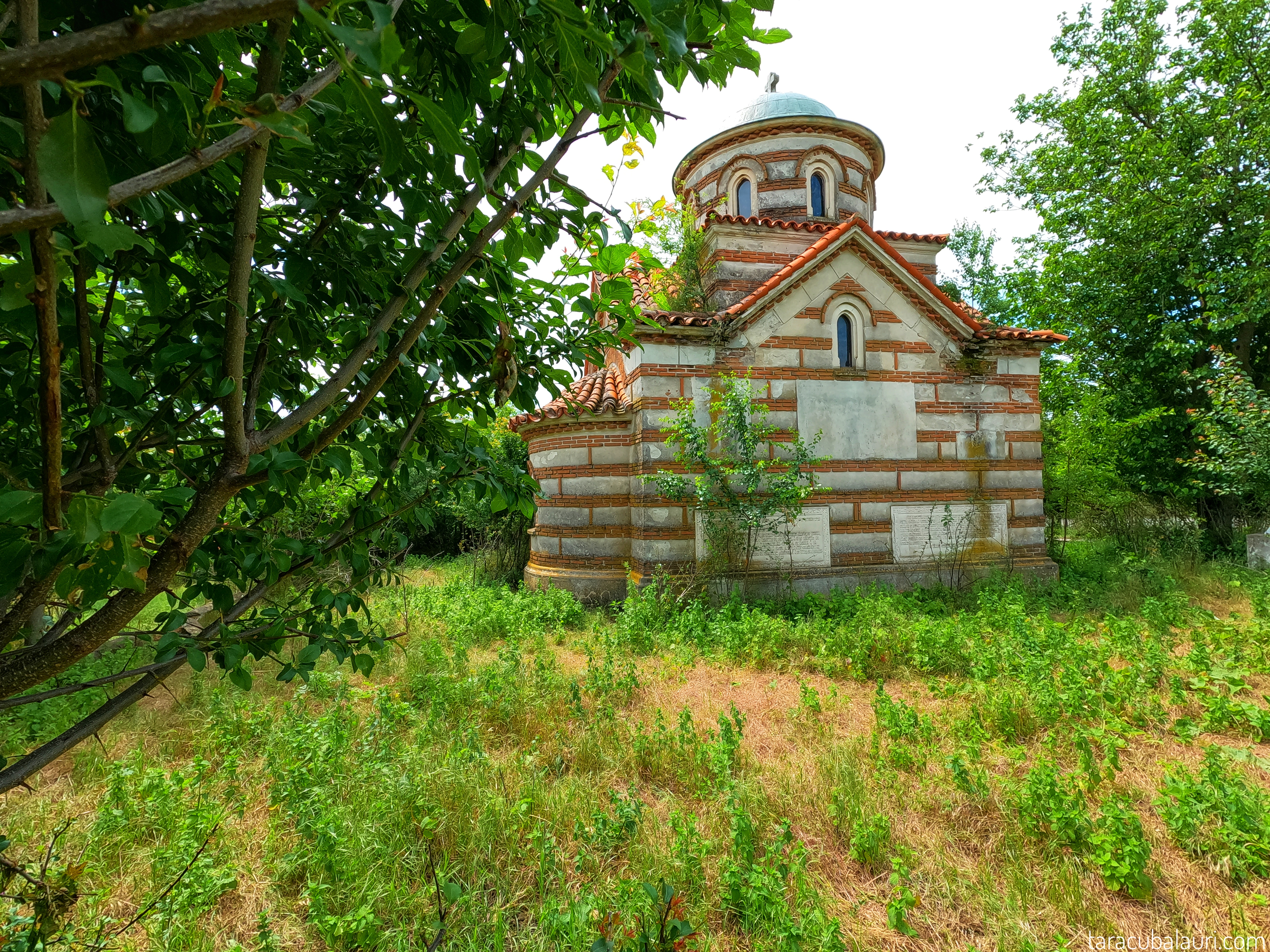
The Antonescu chapel in Vitănești

He is buried in Vitănești, in Teleorman County, in a mortuary chapel which is now listed as a historical monument.
