= Gheorghe Tătărescu =

Romanian politician (1886–1957)

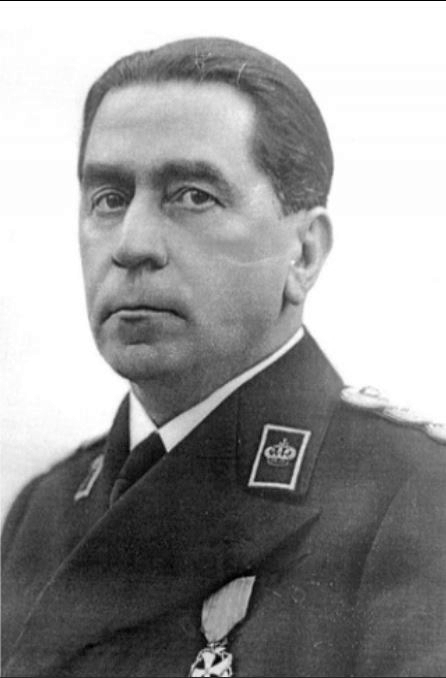
- Tătărescu, c.1940s

36th Prime Minister of Romania
- In office 25 November 1939 – 4 July 1940
- Monarch: Carol II
- Preceded by: Constantin Argetoianu
- Succeeded by: Ion Gigurtu
- In office 3 January 1934 – 28 December 1937
- Monarch: Carol II
- Preceded by: Constantin Anghelescu
- Succeeded by: Octavian Goga

Vice President of the Council of Ministers
- In office 6 March 1945 – 5 November 1947
- Monarch: Michael I
- Prime Minister: Petru Groza
- Preceded by: Petru Groza
- Succeeded by: Gheorghe Gheorghiu-Dej

Member of the Crown Council
- In office 30 March 1938 – 6 September 1940
- Monarch: Carol II

Minister of Foreign Affairs
- In office 6 March 1945 – 29 December 1947
- Prime Minister: Petru Groza
- Preceded by: Constantin Vișoianu
- Succeeded by: Ana Pauker
- In office 11 February 1938 – 29 March 1938
- Prime Minister: Miron Cristea
- Preceded by: Istrate Micescu
- Succeeded by: Nicolae Petrescu-Comnen
- In office 2 October 1934 – 9 October 1934
- Preceded by: Nicolae Titulescu
- Succeeded by: Nicolae Titulescu

Minister of Interior
- In office 25 November 1939 – 30 November 1939
- Prime Minister: Himself
- Preceded by: Nicolae Ottescu
- Succeeded by: Mihail Ghelmegeanu
- In office 23 February 1937 – 14 November 1937
- Prime Minister: Himself
- Preceded by: Dumitru Iuca
- Succeeded by: Richard Franasovici

Personal details
- Born: 2 November 1886 Târgu Jiu, Kingdom of Romania
- Died: 28 March 1957 (aged 70) Bucharest, Romanian People's Republic
- Party: National Liberal Party; National Renaissance Front; National Liberal Party-Tătărescu
- Profession: Lawyer

Gheorghe I. Tătărescu (Note: Romanian pronunciation: [ˈɡe̯orɡe tətəˈresku]) (also known as Guță Tătărescu, with a slightly antiquated pet form of his given name; 2 November 1886 – 28 March 1957) was a Romanian politician who served twice as Prime Minister of Romania (1934–1937; 1939–1940), three times as Minister of Foreign Affairs (interim in 1934 and 1938, appointed to the office in 1945–1947) and once as Minister of War (1934). Representing the "young liberals" faction inside the National Liberal Party (PNL), Tătărescu began his political career as a collaborator of Ion G. Duca, becoming noted for his anticommunism and, in time, for his conflicts with the PNL's leader Dinu Brătianu and the Foreign Minister Nicolae Titulescu. During his first time in office, he moved closer to King Carol II and led an ambivalent policy toward the fascist Iron Guard and ultimately becoming instrumental in establishing the authoritarian and corporatist regime around the National Renaissance Front. In 1940, he accepted the cession of Bessarabia and Northern Bukovina to the Soviet Union and had to resign.

After the start of World War II, Gheorghe Tătărescu initiated a move to rally political forces in opposition to Ion Antonescu's dictatorship, and sought an alliance with the Romanian Communist Party (PCR). He was twice expelled from the PNL, in 1938 and 1944, creating instead his own group, the National Liberal Party-Tătărescu, and representing it inside the communist-endorsed Petru Groza cabinet. In 1946–1947, he was also the President of the Romanian Delegation to the Peace Conference in Paris. Then, relations between Tătărescu and the PCR began to sour, and he was replaced from the leadership of both his own party and the Foreign Ministry when his name was implicated in the Tămădău Affair. Following the Communist takeover, he was arrested and held as a political prisoner while being called to testify in the trial of Lucrețiu Pătrășcanu. He died soon after his release from prison.

Elected an honorary member of the Romanian Academy in 1937, he was removed from his seat by the communist authorities in 1948. One of his brothers, Colonel Ștefan Tătărescu, was at some point the leader of a minor Nazi group, the National Socialist Party.

== Early life and politics ==
Born in Târgu Jiu, Tătărescu studied at Carol I High School in Craiova. He later went to France, where he was awarded a doctorate from the University of Paris in 1912, with a thesis on the Romanian parliamentary system (Le régime électoral et parlementaire en Roumanie). He subsequently worked as a lawyer in Bucharest. He fathered a son, Tudor, and a daughter, Sanda (married to the lawyer Ulise Negropontes in 1940).

After joining the National Liberal Party (PNL), he was elected to the Chamber of Deputies for the first time in November 1919, representing Gorj County. Among his first notable actions as a politician was an initiative to interpellate Nicolae L. Lupu, the Minister of Interior Affairs Ministry in the Romanian National Party-Peasants' Party cabinet in answer to concerns that the executive was tolerating socialist agitation in the countryside.

He stood among the PNL's "young liberals" faction, as they were colloquially known, supporting free trade and a more authoritarian rule over the country around King Carol II, and opposing both the older generation of leaders (who tended to advocate protectionism and a liberal democracy) and the dissident group of Gheorghe I. Brătianu (see National Liberal Party-Brătianu).

The Undersecretary in the Interior Affairs Ministry under several PNL cabinets (beginning with that of Ion I. C. Brătianu in 1922–1926), he first became noted as a collaborator of Ion G. Duca. In 1924–1936, in contrast to his agenda after World War II agenda, Tătărescu was a noted anticommunist, and reacted vehemently against the Romanian Communist Party (PCdR, later PCR), recommending and obtaining its outlawing, based on communist adversity to the concept of Greater Romania, and notably arguing that the Comintern-supported Tatarbunary Uprising was evidence of "imperialist communism".

== First cabinet ==
=== Context ===
Tătărescu became leader of the cabinet in January 1934, as the fascist Iron Guard had assassinated Prime Minister Duca on 30 December 1933 (the five-day premiership of Constantin Anghelescu ensured transition between the two governments). His was the second PNL cabinet formed during Carol's reign, and the latter's failure to draw support from the mainstream group led to a tight connection being established between Carol and the young liberals, with Tătărescu backing the process leading to the creation of a royal dictatorship. One of Tătărescu's first measures was a decisive move to end the conflict between the National Liberal executive and the Mayor of Bucharest, Dem I. Dobrescu (who was backed by the National Peasants' Party)—making use of his prerogative, he removed Dobrescu from office on 18 January.

The brief period constituted a reference point in Romanian economy, as the emergence from the Great Depression, although marked by endemic problems, saw prosperity more widespread than ever before. This was, in part, the contribution of new economic relations which Tătărescu defended and encouraged: the state transformed itself into the main agent of economic activities, allowing for prosperous businesses to benefit from its demands, and, in time, leading to the creation of a camarilla dominated by the figures of industrialists such as Aristide Blank, Nicolae Malaxa, and Max Auschnitt. In this context, Tătărescu's allegedly subservient position in front of Carol was a frequent topic of ridicule at the time. According to a hostile account of the socialist Petre Pandrea:

"Tătărescu was ceremonious in order to cover his menial nature. When he was leaving audiences [with the King], he pressed forward on the small of his back and returned facing backwards from the desk to the door, not daring to show his back. [...] Watching over the scene [...], Carol II exclaimed to his intimate assistants:
— I don't have a big enough tooshie for all the politicians to kiss!"

Among other services rendered, he intervened in the conflict between Carol and his brother, Prince Nicholas, asking the latter to renounce either his marriage to Ioana Dumitrescu-Doletti—considered a misalliance by Carol, it had not been recognized by Romanian authorities—or his princely prerogatives. Nicholas chose the latter alternative in 1937.

Inside his party, Tătărescu lost ground to Dinu Brătianu, elected by the traditional Liberal elite as a compromise in order to ensure unity; upon his election in 1934, the latter stated:

"This time as well, I would have gladly conceded, if I were to believe that anyone else in the party could gather voter unanimity."

The issue remained debated for the following two years. The party congress of July 1936 eventually elected Tătărescu to the second position in the party, that of general secretary.

=== European politics ===
In his foreign policy, Prime Minister Tătărescu balanced two different priorities, attempting to strengthen the traditional military alliance with Poland which was aimed at the Soviet Union, and reacting against the growing regional influence of Nazi Germany by maintaining the relevancy of the Little Entente and establishing further contacts with the Soviets.

In August 1936, he removed Nicolae Titulescu from the office of foreign minister, replacing him with Victor Antonescu. This caused an uproar, with most of Romania's diplomatic corps voicing their dissatisfaction. Over the following months, virtually all of Titulescu's supporters were themselves recalled (including, among others, Constantin Vișoianu, the ambassador to Poland, Constantin Antoniade, Romania's representative to the League of Nations, Dimitrie Ghyka, the ambassador to Belgium, and Caius Brediceanu, the ambassador to Austria) while Titulescu's adversaries, such as Antoine Bibesco, were returned to office. Bibesco subsequently campaigned in France and the United Kingdom, in an attempt to reassure Romania's main allies that the move did not signify a change in Romania's priorities. Tătărescu was later blamed by his own party for having renounced the diplomatic course on which Romania had engaged.

In early 1937, Tătărescu rejected the proposal of Józef Beck, Poland's Minister of Foreign Affairs, to withdraw Romania's support for Czechoslovakia and attempt a reconciliation with Hungary (the following year, Romania withdrew its support for the former, indicating, just before the Munich Agreement, that it was not in a position to guarantee Czechoslovakia's frontiers). This was accompanied by Czechoslovak initiatives to establish close contacts between the Little Entente and the Soviets: a scandal erupted in the same year, when the country's ambassador to Romania, Jan Šeba, published a volume calling for Soviet-Entente military cooperation (despite the Soviet-Romanian conflict over Bessarabia) and expressing the hope that the Soviet state would extend its borders into West Belarus and Ukraine. Kamil Krofta, Czechoslovakia's foreign minister, received criticism for having prefaced the book, and, after Tătărescu paid a visit to Czechoslovak Prime Minister Milan Hodža, Šeba was recalled to Prague.

=== Facing the Iron Guard ===
In combating the Iron Guard, Tătărescu chose to relax virtually all pressures on the latter (while mimicking some of its messages), and instead concentrated again on curbing the activities of the Romanian Communist Party (PCR) and outlawing its Popular Front-type organizations (see Amicii URSS).

In April 1936, he and the Minister of the Interior Ion Inculeț allowed a youth congress to gather in Târgu Mureș, aware of the fact that it was masking a fascist gathering; delegates to the congress, traveling in a special train commissioned by the government, vandalized Ion Duca's memorial plate in Sinaia train station, and, upon their arrival in Târgu Mureș, made public their violent antisemitic agenda. It was probably there that death squads were designated and assigned missions, leading to the murder of Mihai Stelescu, a former associate, in June of the next year.

In February 1937, an intense publicity campaign by the Guard, begun with the ostentatious funerals of Ion Moța and Vasile Marin (killed in the Spanish Civil War) and culminating in the physical assaulting of Traian Bratu, rector of the University of Iași, by Guardist students, provoked the premier's order to close down universities throughout the country.

Later in that year, the collaboration between monarch and premier, coupled with the fact that Tătărescu had successfully attracted nationalist votes from the Iron Guard, led to the signing of an electoral agreement between the latter, the National Peasants' Party (the main democratic opposition group), and the National Liberal Party-Brătianu—the pact was meant to prevent all attempt by Carol to manipulate the votes in elections. (A secondary and unexpected development was that the illegal PCR, which had decided to back the National Peasants' Party prior to the elections, eventually supported the electoral pact.) Tătărescu's own alliance policy rose the anger of his opponents inside the PNL, as he signed collaboration agreements with the fascist Romanian Front and German Party.

The 1937 elections led to an unprecedented situation: although the PNL and Tătărescu had gained the largest percentage of the vote (almost 36%), they fell short of being awarded majority bonus (granted at 40% of the vote). As the far right had gathered momentum (the Guard, running under the name of "Everything for the Fatherland Party", had obtained 15.6% of the vote), Carol was faced with the threat of an Iron Guard government, which would have been one deeply opposed to all of his political principles: he called on a third party, Octavian Goga's National Christian Party (coming from the antisemitic far right but deeply opposed to the Guard) to form a new cabinet in December of that year.

Consequently, Tătărescu renounced his offices inside the party, and, while keeping his office of general secretary, he was surpassed by the readmitted Gheorghe I. Brătianu — who was elected to the new office of PNL vice president on 10 January 1938. After the failure of Goga's policies to curb the rise of their competitors, the king, backed by Tătărescu, resorted to dissolving all political parties on 30 May 1938, creating instead the National Renaissance Front.

=== Rearmament ===
As prime minister, Tătărescu showed particular concern for the modernization of the Romanian Armed Forces. Almost immediately after becoming prime minister, he established the Ministry of Armaments, chaired by himself. This ministry lasted for over three years before being dissolved on 23 February 1937, during his third cabinet.

Under Tătărăscu's premiership, Romania launched a ten-year rearmament program on 27 April 1935. Under this program, Romania acquired 248 Škoda 100 mm howitzers (delivered in the mid-1930s) and 180 Škoda 150 mm howitzers (delivered between 1936 and 1939). In 1936, Romania ordered 126 LT vz 35 tanks and 35 R-1 tankettes. These acquisitions from Czechoslovakia were followed in 1937 by 12 Focke-Wulf Fw 58 aircraft, ordered from Germany and delivered between April and June that same year. Romania employed German technicians to build a shipyard at Galați using materials supplied by the Reșița works. There, two submarines would be built between 1938 and 1943, among others (Marsuinul and Rechinul). The resumed and much improved trade relations with Škoda, following the disastrous "Škoda Affair" of the early 1930s, were credited to the energy and ability of Tătărăscu, "the soldier-politician who reversed the usual order in Romanian politics by placing the welfare of the country superior to the lust for graft". It is worth noting, however, that of the 35 tankettes and 126 tanks ordered during Tătărescu's premiership, only 10 of the former and 15 of the latter actually arrived in Romania before the end of his mandate at the end of 1937. Both of these orders were delivered in full during late 1938 and early 1939, respectively. In 1936, Romania also started producing the Polish PZL P.11 fighter aircraft, of which 95 were ultimately built by IAR. In 1937, Romanian production of the improved PZL P.24 also commenced, with 25 fighters being built until 1939.

== Second cabinet ==
In this context, Tătărescu chose to back the regime, as the PNL, like the National Peasants' Party, remained active in nominal clandestinity (as the law banning it had never been enforced any further). Having personally signed the document banning opposition parties, he was expelled from the PNL in April 1938, and contested the legitimacy of the action for the following years. Allegedly, his ousting was recommended by Iuliu Maniu, leader of the National Peasants' Party's and, for the following years, the closest of Dinu Brătianu's political allies.

Soon after his second arrival to power, Tătărescu became noted for the enthusiastic support he gave to the modernist sculptor Constantin Brâncuși, and directed state funds to finance the building of Brâncuși's The Endless Column complex in Târgu Jiu (completed in October 1938).

Alongside Alexandru Vaida-Voevod and Constantin Argetoianu (whom he succeeded as Premier), Tătărescu became a dominant figure in the group of maverick pro-Carol politicians. After a bloody crackdown on the Iron Guard, the Front attempted to reunite political forces in a national government that was to back Carol's foreign policies in view of increasing threats on Romania's borders after the outbreak of World War II. In 1945, Tătărescu stressed his belief that authoritarianism benefited Romania, and supported the view that Carol had meant to keep Romania out of the war. Tătărescu's second cabinet was meant to reflect the latter policies, but it did not draw any support from traditional parties, and, in April 1940, Carol, assisted by Ernest Urdăreanu and Mihail Ghelmegeanu, began talks with the (by then much weaker) Iron Guard.

Tătărescu remained in office throughout the rest of the Phony War, until the fall of France, and his cabinet signed an economic agreement with Nazi Germany (through which virtually all Romanian exports were directed towards the latter country) and saw the crumbling of Romania's alliance with the United Kingdom and France. The cabinet was brought down by the cession of Bessarabia and Northern Bukovina to the Soviet Union (effects of the Molotov–Ribbentrop Pact), as well as by Carol's attempt to appease German hostility by dissolving it, replacing Tătărescu with Ion Gigurtu, and recreating the Front as the totalitarian Party of the Nation.

== World War II ==
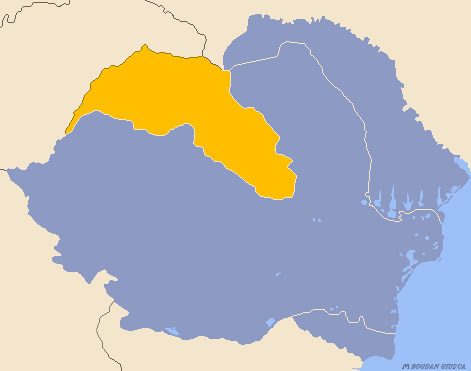
Greater Romania with Northern Transylvania highlighted in yellow

After the Second Vienna Award (when Northern Transylvania was lost to Hungary, confirming Carol's failure to preserve both the country's neutrality and its territorial integrity), Romania was taken over by an Iron Guard dictatorial government (the National Legionary State). Speaking five years later, Dinu Brătianu placed the blame for the serious developments on Tătărescu's own actions, addressing him directly:

"I remind you: [...] you have contributed directly, in 1940, in steering the country towards a foreign policy that, as one could tell even then, was to prove ill-fated and which led us to the loathsome Vienna settlement, one which you have supported inside the Crown Council [...]."

On 26 November 1940, the Iron Guard began a bloody retaliation against various political figures who had served under Carol (following a late investigation into the 1938 killing of Corneliu Zelea Codreanu, the movement's founder and early leader, by Carol's authorities). Tătărescu and Constantin Argetoianu were among the second wave of captured politicians (on 27 November), and were destined for arbitrary execution; they were, however, saved by the intervention of regular police forces, most of whom had grown hostile to the Guardist militias.

Retired from political life during the war, he was initially sympathetic to Ion Antonescu's pro-German dictatorship (see Romania during World War II)—Dinu Brătianu, who remained in opposition to the Antonescu regime, made mention an official visit to Bessarabia, recovered after the start of Operation Barbarossa, when Tătărescu had accompanied Antonescu, "thus making common cause with his warmongering action". At the time, his daughter Sandra Tătărescu Negropontes worked as an ambulance driver for the Romanian Red Cross.

In the end, Tătărescu became involved in negotiations aimed at withdrawing Romania from the conflict, and, while beginning talks with the Romanian Communist Party (PCR), tried to build foreign connections to support Romania's cause following the inevitable defeat; he thus corresponded with Edvard Beneš, leader of the Czechoslovak government in exile in England. Beneš, who had already been discussing matters involving Romania with Richard Franasovici and Grigore Gafencu, and had agreed to support the Romanian cause, informed the Allied governments of Tătărescu's designs.

Tătărescu later contrasted his diplomatic approach with the strategy of Barbu Știrbey (who had only attempted an agreement with the Western Allies in Cairo, instead of opening relations with the Soviets). Initially meeting with the refusal of Iuliu Maniu and Dinu Brătianu (who decided to invest their trust in Știrbey), he was relatively successful after the Cairo initiative proved fruitless: the two traditional parties accepted collaboration with the bloc formed by the PCR, the Romanian Social Democratic Party, the Ploughmen's Front, and the Socialist Peasants' Party, leading to the formation of the short-lived and unstable National Democratic Bloc (BND) in June 1944. It overthrew Antonescu in August, by means of the successful King Michael Coup.

== Alliance with the Communists ==
Tătărescu returned to the PNL later in 1944—after the Soviet Red Army had entered Romania and the country had become an Allied state, political parties were again allowed to register. Nevertheless, Tătărescu was again opposed to the party leaders Dinu and Gheorghe I. Brătianu, and split to form his own group in June–July 1945. Dinu Brătianu convened the PNL leadership and formally excluded Tătărescu and his partisans, citing their support for dictatorial regimes.

As the PCR, which was growing more influential (with the backing of Soviet occupation) while generally lacking popular appeal, sought to form alliances with various forces in order to increase its backing, Tătărescu declared his group to be left-wing and Social liberal, while attempting to preserve a middle course in the new political setting, by pleading for close relations to be maintained with both the Soviet Union and the Western Allies. N. D. Cocea, a prominent socialist who had joined the PNL, represented the faction in talks for an alliance with the Communists. The agreement, favored by Ana Pauker, was vehemently opposed by another member of the Communist leadership, Lucrețiu Pătrășcanu, who argued in favor of "making a distinction inside the bourgeoisie", and collaborating with the main PNL, while calling Tătărescu's faction "a gang of con artists, blackmailers, and well-known bribers".

Tătărescu became Foreign Minister and vice president of the government in the cabinet of Petru Groza when the latter came into office after Soviet pressures in 1945; his faction had been awarded leadership of four other ministries—Finance, with three successive office-holders (of whom the last was Alexandru Alexandrini), Public Works, with Gheorghe Vântu, Industry (with Petre N. Bejan), and Religious Affairs, with Radu Roșculeț. He indirectly helped the PCR carry out an electoral fraud during the general election in 1946 by failing to reply to American proposals for organizing fair elections. At the Paris Conference, where he was accompanied by the PCR leaders Gheorghe Gheorghiu-Dej and Pătrășcanu, he acknowledged the dissolution of Greater Romania under the provisions of the new Treaty (1947).

== 1947 and after ==
Tensions between his group with the PCR occurred when the former founded itself as a party under the name of National-Liberal Party (commonly known as the National Liberal Party-Tătărescu), and, in June–July 1945, proclaimed its goal to be the preservation of property and a middle class under a new regime. Of himself and his principles, Tătărescu stated:

"I am not a communist. Taking in view my attitudes towards mankind, society, property, I am not a communist. Thus, the new orientation in external politics which I demand for my country cannot be accused of being determined by affinities or sympathies of doctrine."

Speaking in retrospect, Gheorghiu-Dej indicated the actual relation between his party and Tătărescu's: "we have had to tolerate by our side a capitalist-gentry political group, Tătărescu's group".

Tătărescu himself continued to show his support for several PCR policies: in the summer of 1947, he condemned the United States for having protested against the repression of forces in the opposition. Nevertheless, at around the same time, he issued his own critique of the Groza government, becoming the target of violent attacks initiated by Miron Constantinescu in the PCR press. Consequently, he was singled out for negligence in office when, during the kangaroo trial of Iuliu Maniu (see Tămădău Affair), it was alleged that several employees of his ministry had conspired against the government. Scînteia, the official voice of the PCR, wrote of all National Liberal Party-Tătărescu offices in the government: "The rot is all-encompassing! It has to be removed!".

Tătărescu resigned his office on 6 November 1947, and was replaced by the Communist Ana Pauker. For the following two months, he was sidelined in his own party by PCR pressures, and removed from its leadership in January 1948 (being replaced with Petre N. Bejan—the party was subsequently known as National Liberal Party-Petre N. Bejan). One of his last actions as cabinet member had been to sign the document officially rejecting the Marshall Plan.

After the proclamation of the People's Republic of Romania on 30 December 1947, the existence of all parties other than the PCR had become purely formal, and, after the elections of 28 March the one-party state was confirmed by legislation. He was arrested on 5 May 1950, and held in the notorious Sighet Prison, alongside three of his brothers—Ștefan Tătărescu included—and his former collaborator Bejan. His son Tudor, who was living in Paris, suffered from schizophrenia after 1950, and had to be committed to an institution (where he died in 1955). Sandra Tătărescu Negropontes was also imprisoned in 1950, and released three years later, upon the death of Joseph Stalin.

One of Gheorghe Tătărescu's last appearances in public was his stand as one of the prosecution's witnesses in the 1954 trial of Lucrețiu Pătrășcanu, when he claimed that the defendant had been infiltrated into the PCR during the time when he had been premier (Pătrășcanu was posthumously cleared of all charges). Released in 1955, Tătărescu died in Bucharest, less than two years later. According to Sanda Tătărescu Negropontes, this came as a result of tuberculosis contracted while in detention.
