= Nicolae Titulescu =

Romanian diplomat and politician (1882–1941)

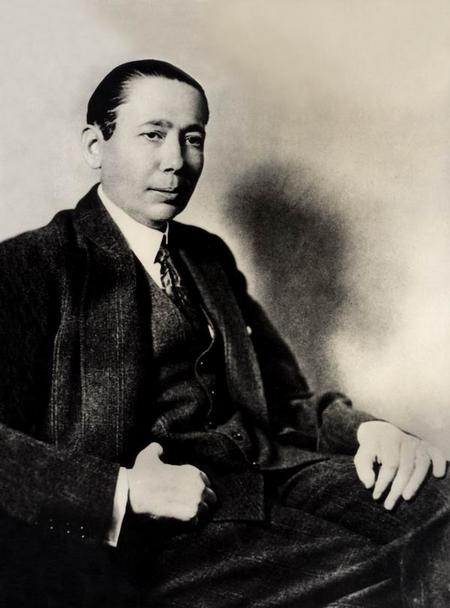
- Titulescu, circa 1930

Minister of Foreign Affairs
- In office 10 October 1934 – 28 August 1936
- Monarch: Carol II
- Preceded by: Gheorghe Tătărescu
- Succeeded by: Victor Antonescu
- In office 20 October 1932 – 1 October 1934
- Monarch: Carol II
- Preceded by: Alexandru Vaida-Voevod
- Succeeded by: Gheorghe Tătărescu
- In office 24 November 1927 – 9 November 1928
- Monarch: Michael I
- Preceded by: Ion I. C. Brătianu
- Succeeded by: Gheorghe Mironescu

President of the Assembly of the League of Nations
- In office 1930–1932
- Preceded by: José Gustavo Guerrero
- Succeeded by: Paul Hymans

Personal details
- Born: 4 March 1882 Craiova, Kingdom of Romania
- Died: 17 March 1941 (aged 59) Cannes, Vichy France
- Resting place: Cemetery at St. Nicholas Church, Brașov
- Spouse: Catherine Titulescu

Nicolae Titulescu (Romanian pronunciation: [nikoˈla.e tituˈlesku]; 4 March 1882 – 17 March 1941) was a Romanian politician and diplomat, at various times ambassador, finance minister, and foreign minister, and for two terms served as president of the General Assembly of the League of Nations (1930–32).

== Early years ==
Nicolae Titulescu was born on 4 March 1882 in Craiova, the son of a solicitor. He grew up at his father's estate in Titulești, a commune in Romania that was later named after him. Upon graduating with honours in 1900 from the Carol I High School in Craiova, Titulescu studied law in Paris, obtaining his doctorate with the thesis Essai sur une théorie des droits éventuels. In 1905, Titulescu returned to Romania as a professor of law at the University of Iași, and in 1907 he moved to Bucharest.

== Political career ==
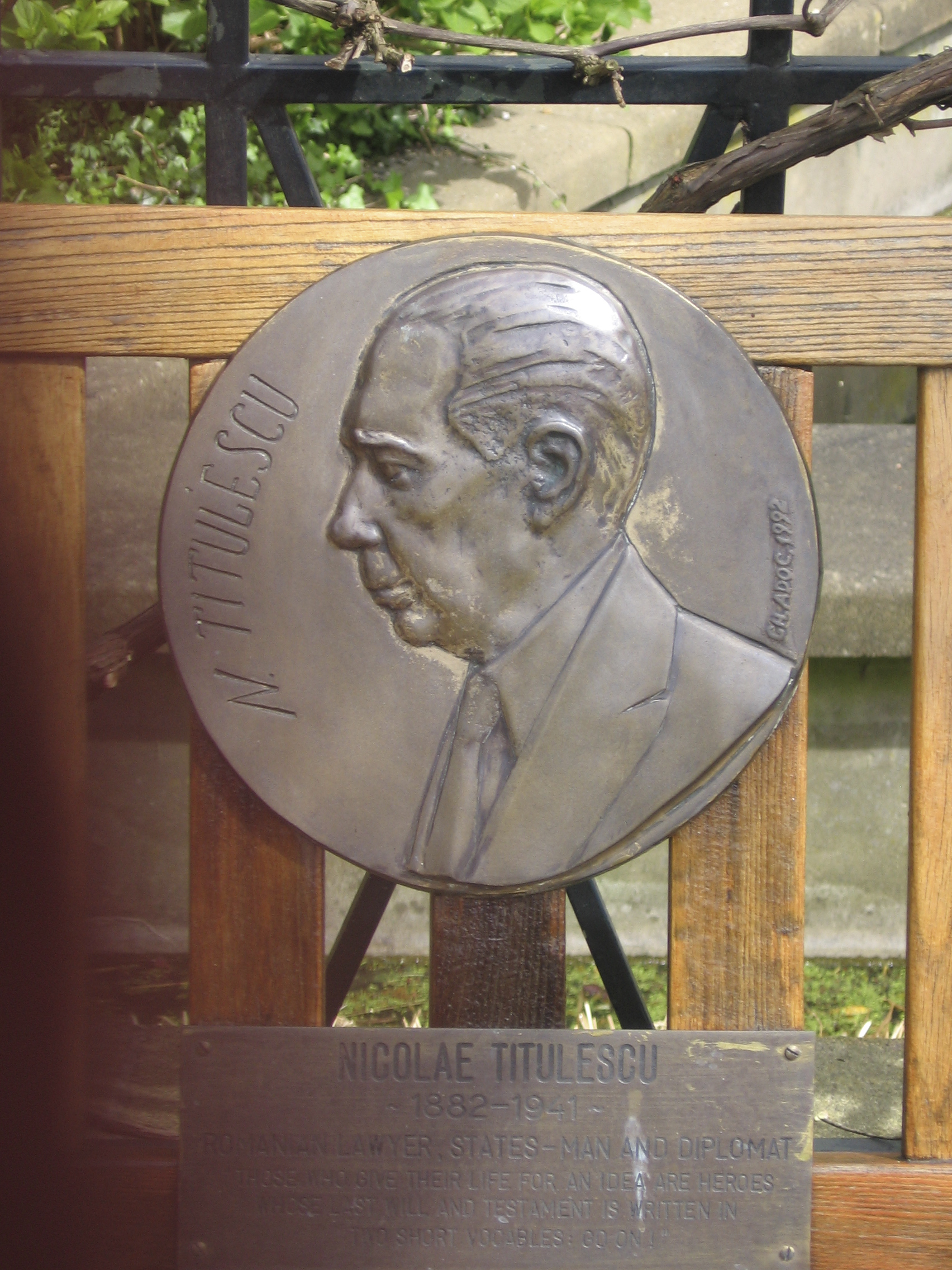
Commemorative relief on Peace Palace Garden bench, a gift from the Romanian government.

Following the Romanian elections of 1912, Titulescu became a parliamentarian with the Conservative-Democratic Party led by Take Ionescu, and five years later he became a member of the government of Ion I. C. Brătianu as Minister of Finance.

In the summer of 1918, together with other prominent Romanians (Take Ionescu, Octavian Goga, Traian Vuia, Constantin Mille), Titulescu formed, in Paris, the National Romanian Committee, with the purpose of promoting in international public opinion the right of the Romanian people to national unity, the committee being officially recognised as the plenipotentiary de facto organ of the Romanian nation.

After the war, Titulescu was finance minister in the second Averescu government in 1920–21. He was then appointed Romanian Ambassador to the United Kingdom, a position he held on-and-off until 1936.

Beginning in 1921, Titulescu functioned as the permanent representative of Romania to the League of Nations in Geneva. He was chosen twice (in 1930 and 1931) to be the president of the General Assembly of that organization. In this capacity, he fought for the preservation of stable borders through the maintenance of peace, for good relations between both large and small neighboring states, for the respect of the sovereignty and equality of all nations in the international community, for collective security, and the prevention of aggression.

In June 1936, Titulescu reacted to the buffoonery exhibited by the Italian journalists when Emperor Haile Selassie I spoke to the League after Ethiopia had been invaded and occupied by Fascist Italy. He jumped to his feet and shouted: "To the door with the savages!" ("A la porte les sauvages!"). Patrick Leigh Fermor described him as "tall and mandarin-like, but with splendid histrionic gestures, and obviously a comic genius of the first order".

From 1927 to 1928, Titulescu was the minister of foreign affairs, a post he held again from 1932 to 1936. After an initial period of skepticism, he concluded that Romania needed an alliance with the Soviet Union, and he conducted many negotiations with Commissar for Foreign Affairs Maxim Litvinov. These failed due to lack of support from king Carol II and other Romanian political leaders.

In 1935, Titulescu was elected a titular member of the Romanian Academy.

== Exile and death ==
In August 1936, King Carol II removed Titulescu from all official positions, asking him to leave the country. Settling first in Switzerland, he later moved to France. In exile, he continued in conferences and newspaper articles to propagate the idea of the preservation of peace, as he perceived the danger of the approaching war. He returned to Romania in November 1937, partly by the efforts of Iuliu Maniu.

In 1937, Titulescu again left Romania and took refuge in France. At Cannes, he denounced the Romanian fascist regime. On 17 March 1941, Titulescu died in Cannes, France following a long illness. In his will, he asked to be buried in Romania.

In 1989, after the fall of communist Romania during the Romanian Revolution, the honouring of Titulescu's request became possible. On 14 March 1992, his remains were reburied in the Sfânta Ecaterina cemetery in Șcheii Brașovului, next to St. Nicholas Church, Brașov after a difficult legal procedure organized by Jean-Paul Carteron, a French attorney. He was awarded Order of the White Eagle and other decorations.
