= Ion G. Duca =

Romanian liberal politician, diplomat and lawyer (1879–1933)

Ion Gheorghe Duca
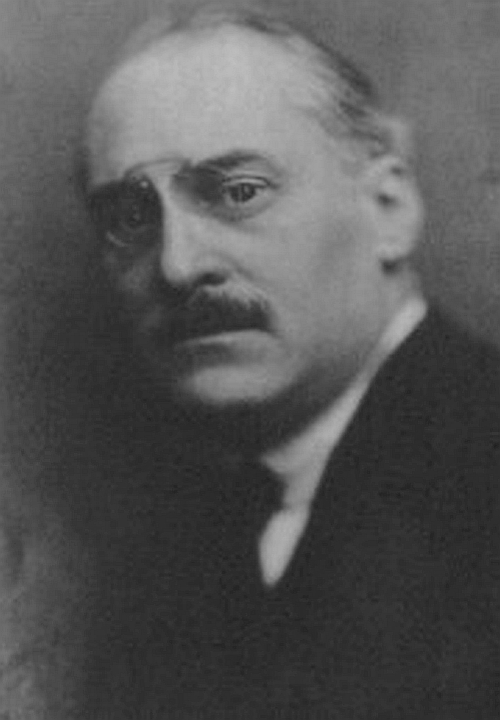

35th Prime Minister of Romania
- In office 14 November 1933 – 30 December 1933
- Monarch: Carol II
- Preceded by: Alexandru Vaida-Voevod
- Succeeded by: Constantin Angelescu

Minister of Foreign Affairs of Romania
- In office 19 January 1922 – 29 March 1926
- Prime Minister: Ion I. C. Brătianu
- Preceded by: Gheorghe Derussi
- Succeeded by: Ion Mitilineu

Personal details
- Born: 20 December 1879 Bucharest, Romania
- Died: 30 December 1933 (aged 54) Sinaia train station, Prahova County, Kingdom of Romania
- Cause of death: Assassination
- Resting place: Urșani, Vâlcea County
- Party: National Liberal Party
- Education: University of Paris

Ion Gheorghe Duca (Romanian pronunciation: [iˈon ˈduka]; 20 December 1879 – 30 December 1933) was a Romanian liberal politician, diplomat, and lawyer who briefly served as Prime Minister from November to December 1933. A leading figure in the National Liberal Party, Duca held multiple ministerial roles, including Minister of Foreign Affairs and Minister of the Interior. As Prime Minister, he sought to modernize Romania and strengthen Western alliances but faced severe opposition from the Iron Guard, a revolutionary fascist movement. His crackdown on the group led to his assassination on 30 December 1933. Duca is remembered as an outspoken opponent of fascism, for his commitment to democracy and modernization and as a symbol of interwar Romania’s political turmoil.

== Early life ==
Ion Gheorghe Duca was born on 20 December 1879 in Bucharest, Romania, into a distinguished family known for its contributions to public service and engineering. His father, Gheorghe Duca, was a noted engineer and academic who played a key role in developing Romania’s railway system, offering Duca an early exposure to politics and public life. Duca pursued his higher education at the University of Paris, where he completed a doctorate in law, grounding him in the liberal ideals of European governance.

Upon returning to Romania, Duca joined the National Liberal Party, aligning with its agenda for modernisation, economic reform, and closer ties with Western Europe. With a sharp intellect and articulate style, he quickly gained recognition within the party and secured early political appointments, advocating for reforms in education and foreign policy. These formative experiences and his academic achievements paved the way for his influential career, establishing him as a leading voice in Romanian politics and diplomacy.

== Political career ==
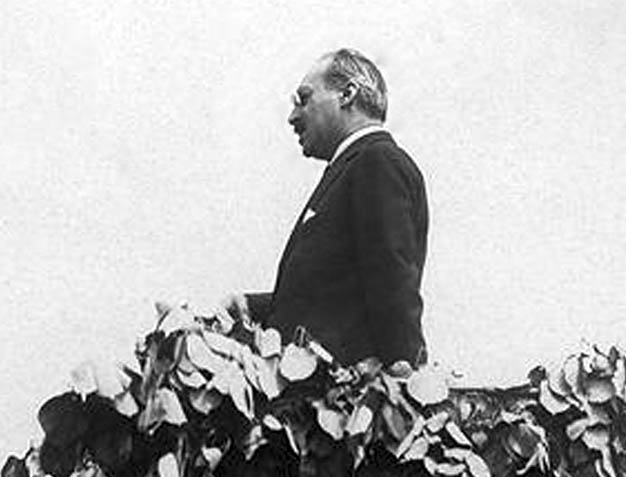
Duca in 1925, as Foreign Minister

In November 1933, King Carol II appointed Duca as Prime Minister to prepare for the December elections. Duca aimed to curb the influence of the Iron Guard, also known as the Legion of the Archangel Michael, a fascist movement led by Corneliu Zelea Codreanu. He moved swiftly to outlaw the Everything For the Country Party, the Iron Guard's political arm, and initiated a crackdown on its activities. This period saw significant unrest, with police, acting on Duca's orders, clashing with Iron Guard members, leading to the deaths of 18 members and the arrest of thousands. Many detainees were soon released, underscoring the government's limited control over the volatile political climate.

Duca's political career began when he entered Romania's Chamber of Deputies in 1907 as a National Liberal Party. His cabinet tenure started in 1914, and by 1922 he was appointed Minister of Foreign Affairs. Duca was a strong advocate for the Little Entente, a coalition formed by Romania, Yugoslavia, and Czechoslovakia to deter Hungarian irredentism particularly Hungary’s claims to Transylvania and the Banat, regions awarded to Romania after World War I—and to prevent any revival of the Habsburg monarchy in Central Europe. On July 7, 1923, he signed the Convention on the Defence Alliance between Romania and the Kingdom of Yugoslavia with Yugoslav representative Bosko Čolak-Antić.

== Death ==
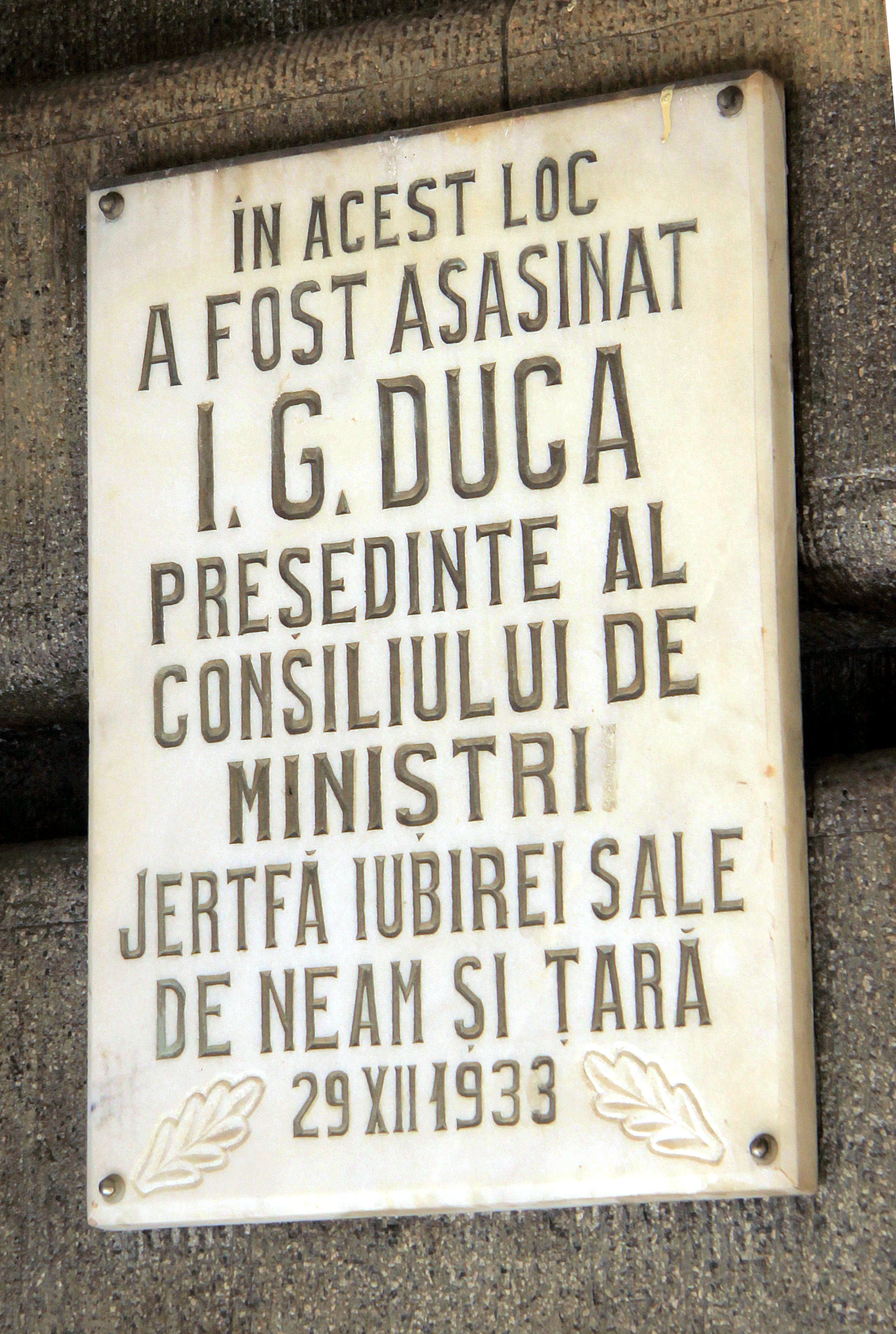
Memorial plaque at Sinaia train station

On 30 December 1933, just 45 days into his term as Prime Minister, Duca was summoned to Peleș Castle, in Sinaia by King Carol II for consultations. Earlier that year, the king had appointed Duca, the new leader of the Liberal Party, to form a government. In an effort to curb the influence of the Iron Guard, Duca had dissolved the organization and held elections in December, where the Liberals won with a decisive 51% of the vote, partly due to peasant support shifting away from their traditional party. However, in retaliation, Iron Guard members ambushed Duca upon his return from the castle, fatally shooting him on the platform of the Sinaia train station. His assassination prompted the declaration of martial law across Romania.

Duca was assassinated just 10 days after his 54th birthday by three Iron Guard members, that formed the Nicadori Iron Guard death squad, comprising Nicolae Constantinescu, Ion Caranica, and Doru Belimace. All three were arrested straight away and sentenced to hard labour for life. They were all killed, as were many other Iron Guard leaders, on 30 November 1938 while being transported to Jilava Prison.

== Legacy ==
Duca left a significant legacy in Romanian history, not only for his contributions to politics but also through his detailed memoirs documenting his experiences as a cabinet minister during World War I. These writings provide valuable insights into Romanian political life and decision-making during a critical period. His son, George Duca, later edited both his own and his father's memoirs while working at the Hoover Institution at Stanford University during the 1970s and 1980s, preserving Duca’s perspective for future generations.

In recognition of his influence, streets have been named in Duca’s honor in several Romanian cities, including Bucharest, Constanța, Craiova, Eforie, Mediaș, and Otopeni. Additionally, a gymnasium in Petroșani bears his name, commemorating his contributions to Romania’s political and cultural history.
