= Constantin Angelescu =

Romanian politician (1869–1948)

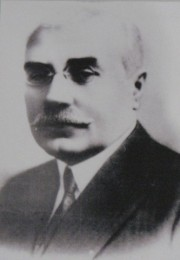
- Constantin Angelescu

Envoy Extraordinary and Minister Plenipotentiary of Romania in the United States
- In office January 15, 1918 – March 16, 1918
- Succeeded by: Nicolae Lahovary

Prime Minister of Romania
- In office December 30, 1933 – January 3, 1934
- Monarch: Carol II
- Preceded by: Ion G. Duca
- Succeeded by: Gheorghe Tătărescu

Minister of Public Instruction, Religious Affairs, and the Arts
- In office November 14, 1933 – January 3, 1934
- Prime Minister: Ion G. Duca; Himself
- Preceded by: Dimitrie Gusti
- Succeeded by: Himself

Minister of Public Instruction
- In office January 5, 1934 – November 14, 1937
- Prime Minister: Gheorghe Tătărescu
- Preceded by: Himself
- Succeeded by: Ion Petrovici

Personal details
- Born: June 10, 1869 Craiova, United Principalities
- Died: September 14, 1948 (aged 79) Bucharest, Romania
- Party: National Liberal Party (until 1935); Romanian Front (1935–1938); National Renaissance Front (1938–1940)
- Profession: Diplomat, politician, physician

Constantin Angelescu (10 June 1869 – 14 September 1948) was a Romanian politician who served as ad interim/acting Prime Minister of Romania for five days, between 30 December 1933 and 3 January 1934.

He was: Doctor of Medicine in Paris, Plenipotentiary Minister in the United States (1917–1918), Minister of Public Works and Communications, of the Instruction and Cults several times, Prime Minister after the death of I.G. Duca, professor and director of the surgical clinic at the Faculty of Medicine in Bucharest.

== Early years ==
Constantin Angelescu was born in 1869 in the family of Dumitru Angelescu (father), a merchant from Craiova, and of Theodore (mother), maiden name Geblescu, whose family was related to the Craiovești family. After the years of education at Obedeanu primary school and at Carol I National College, he studied medicine in Paris. In 1897, in France, he has had his specialization in surgery. He came back to the country, worked in surgery department of Brâncovenesc Hospital, then, at the Filantropia Hospital, becoming professor (1903) and director of the University of Surgery Clinic. By marrying Virginia Constantinescu-Monteoru, the daughter of millionaire Grigore Monteoru, he became the owner of the Sărata Monteoru spas, some of petroleum land and real estate in the Buzău area.

== Political activity ==
Dr. Angelescu started his political career within the National Liberal Party. In 1901, Angelescu became an MP and senator, and later, the minister of public works (1914–1916) and minister of public guidance. As Minister of Public Works in the Government of Ion I. C. Brătianu, he was especially charged with the organization of the Romanian military service, with Romania's entry into World War I. The supporter for the accession to the Triple Entente caused the annoyance of the prime minister who had dismissed him during the establishing of the national union coalition. In 1917, during the evacuation of the government and king to Iași, Angelescu lived for a short time in Odesa, and then returned to the country. In January–March 1918 he was appointed as Romania's first plenipotentiary minister in Washington, D.C. Then in 1918, he was the Deputy Chairman of the National Council for Romanian Unity established by Take Ionescu in Paris.

Later he was the Minister of Public Guidance in Governments chaired by Ion I.C. Bratianu, and then by Ion G. Duca, during which he made important reforms of modernizing education in Romania, as a continuation of those launched in the previous century and in the beginning of the 20th century by his mentor and uncle, within the alliance, Spiru Haret. His motto was: "School as much as possible! School as good as possible! School as Romanian as possible!" The constitutional text on education, as it was formulated on March 29, 1923 was based on the principles of freedom of education, compulsory primary education and free primary education. He contributed to the adoption of the Law on the state primary education and of the normal-primary education of June 26, 1924, to the uniformity of the education system in Romania. In 1925, he reestablished baccalaureate examinations.

Over time, relations with Ion I.C. Bratianu improved, and Dr. Angelescu was next to him in the moments after the assassination attempt in 1904 and in the last hours of his life in 1927, when he closely supervised the medical-surgical treatment he had given.

After the assassination of Prime Minister Ion G. Duca, he was for four days interim prime minister, forced to give way to Gheorghe Tătărescu. He eventually accepted to be the minister of national education in the cabinet headed by Tatarescu.

In 1938–1940, during the royal dictatorship of Carol II of Romania, Dr. Angelescu served as State Secretary (in the government chaired by Patriarch Miron of Romania) and then a royal counselor. He is one of the members of the Crown Council chaired by Carol II who voted for the cession of Bessarabia and northern Bucovina to the Soviet Union following the ultimatum given to Romania on June 26, 1940. Together with Dinu Brătianu, he was against the Second Vienna Award.

Over 24 years, Dr. Constantin Angelescu was the president of the Romanian Athenaeum (1923–1947), and between 1941–1947 he was president of the Cultural League.

On 24 May 1934 he was elected honorary member of the Romanian Academy.

He was a founding member of the Romanian Academy of Sciences.

According to some sources, in 1943, together with Dr. Nicolae Lupu, he proposed to re-establish the right of the Jews to free practice, as it had been taken by the Antisemitism legislation of 1940.

In September 1948 he died at the French hospital Vincent de Paul in Bucharest. Death freed him from arrest and detention in communist prisons.

== The family ==
He had three daughters: Elizabeth, Ioana, and Elena, and three sons: Grigore, Alexander, and Constantine. His daughter, Elisabeth Angelescu, married mathematician Alexandru Ghika; their son, Grigore Ghika, became a physicist. His daughter Ioana (Jeanne) Angelescu married Ștefan Ghika–Budești, geologist, correspondent member of the Romanian Academy, the son of the architect Nicolae Ghika-Budești. And his third daughter, Elena, was married to diplomat George Valimărescu. His son, Constantin C. Angelescu Monteoru (1905–2000), was a professor of constitutional law, dean of the law faculty at the University of Iași. In the years of Stalinist repression, he was deported to the Danube–Black Sea Canal. His daughter, Ioana Angelescu, employed by Radio Free Europe, married George Angelescu, a musician.

== In memoriam ==
- The interdepartamental hospital "Alexandru Sahia" of Bucharest has been renamed into "Dr. Constantin Angelescu".
- A theoretical high school in Bucharest and the college in Buzău were named in honor of Constantin Angelescu.
- His family set up a foundation called the Romanian School of Constantin Angelescu
