= Romania in Action Party =

Romania in Action Party Partidul România în Acțiune
- Abbreviation: RîA
- President: Mihai Apostolache
- Founded: March 2023
- Preceded by: Romanian Social Party
- Headquarters: Ploiești, Prahova
- Ideology: Big tent Centrism; Localism; Civic nationalism
- Political position: Centre
- National affiliation: România Renaște
- Colours: Blue Red
- Mayor: 1 / 3,000
- Local Council: 48 / 39,000
- Chamber of Deputies: 0 / 330
- Senate: 0 / 136

Website
- romaniainactiune.ro

Romania in Action Party (Romanian: Partidul România în Acțiune), often shortened to Romania in Action (Romanian: România în Acțiune) is a Romanian big-tent and centrist political party that ideologically follows localism, and civic nationalism.

The Romania in Action party has almost 50 local elected representatives, including a mayor, in Balta Doamnei commune, and supports the candidacy of Mircea Geoană for the position of president of Romania in the 2024 elections.

The party will have candidates in all counties and in the diaspora in the 2024 parliamentary elections.

== Notable members ==
- Mihai Apostolache — university lecturer, Party president and candidate for the Chamber of Deputies in the Prahova constituency
- Sanda Nicola — former journalist, spokeswoman for Mircea Geoană's campaign, candidate for the Chamber of Deputies in the Bucharest constituency
- Gabriela Ciot — professor at the Faculty of European Studies of UBB, former secretary of state in the Ministry of Foreign Affairs, and candidate for the Chamber of Deputies in the Cluj constituency
- Marius Lazăr — former president of the Green Party (2022-2024), candidate for the Chamber of Deputies in the Sibiu constituency
- Alin Ignat — current deputy (since 2022, elected on PNL list) and candidate for the Chamber of Deputies in the Alba constituency
- Mihaela Popa — teacher, former member of the European Parliament between 2007 and 2008, former PNL senator (2008-2016), former secretary of state in the Ministry of Education, and candidate for the Chamber of Deputies in the Iasi constituency
- David Gheorghe — university professor at the University of Agricultural Sciences and Veterinary Medicine of Banat (USAMVB), former senator between 2004 and 2012, and candidate for the Chamber of Deputies in the Timiș constituency

== Election results ==
2024 Mayoral and Local Council Election
City	Mayor	Municipal Council		
City	Mayor	%	Council	Aftermath
Ploiești	9.19 / 100	6,92%	2 / 27	TBD
Câmpina	2.18 / 100	2,14%	0 / 19	No seats
City	Mayor	City Council		
City	Mayor	%	Council	Aftermath
Mizil	16.88 / 100	16,40%	3 / 17	TBD
Vălenii de Munte	26.62 / 100	16,85%	3 / 17	TBD
Sinaia	0.00 / 100	6,11%	1 / 17	TBD
Slănic	22.92 / 100	18,59%	3 / 13	TBD
Commune	Mayor	Local Council		
Commune	Mayor	%	Council	Aftermath
Balta Doamnei	42.33 / 100	38,09%	4 / 11	Coalition

=== Presidential elections ===
Election	Candidate	First round			Second round		
Election	Candidate	Votes	Percentage	Position	Votes	Percentage	Position
2024	Mircea Geoană (support)	583.879	6.32%	6th	Election annulled		
2025	Nicușor Dan (support)	1,979,767	20.99%	2nd	6,168,642	53.60%	1st
