= Știrbey cabinet =

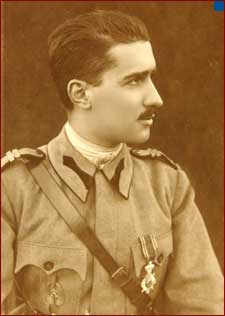
Barbu Ştirbey

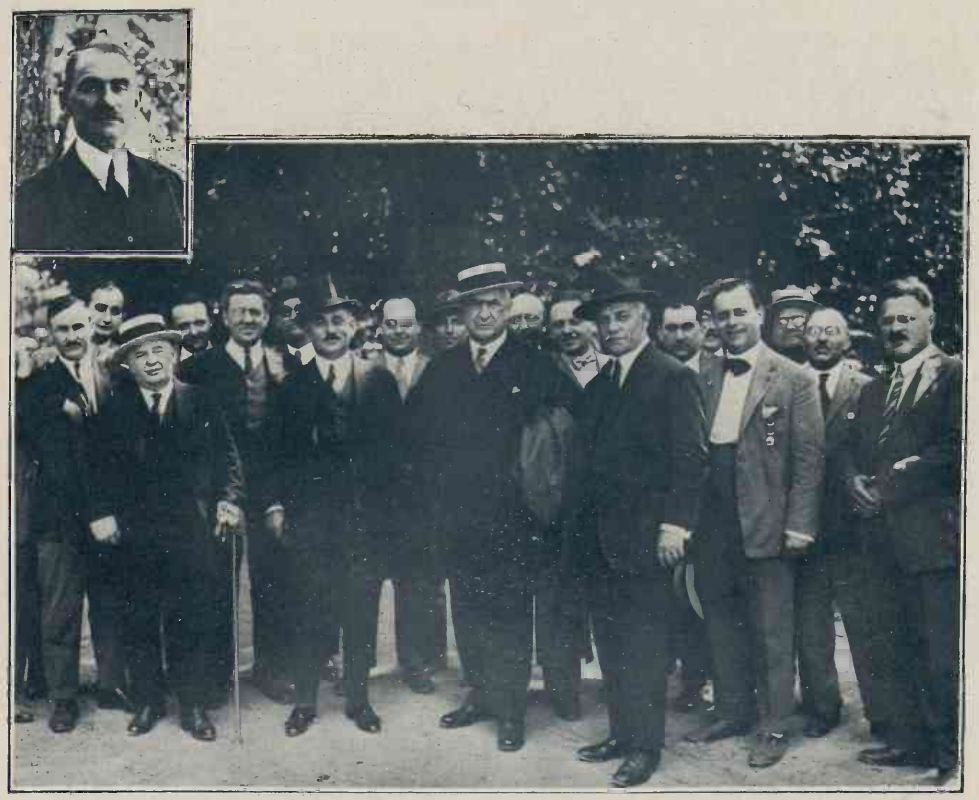
The Știrbei cabinet.

The cabinet of Barbu Știrbey was the government of Romania from 4 June to 20 June 1927.

== Composition ==
The ministers of the cabinet were as follows:

- President of the Council of Ministers:

- Barbu Știrbey (4 - 20 June 1927)

- Minister of the Interior:

- Barbu Știrbey (4 - 20 June 1927)

- Minister of Foreign Affairs:

- (interim) Barbu Știrbey (4 - 20 June 1927)

- Minister of Finance:

- (interim) Barbu Știrbey (4 - 6 June 1927)
- Mihai Popovici (6 - 20 June 1927)

- Minister of Justice:

- Stelian Popescu (4 - 20 June 1927)

- Minister of War:

- Gen. Paul Angelescu (4 - 20 June 1927)

- Minister of Public Works:

- (interim) Constantin D. Dimitriu (4 - 6 June 1927)
- Pantelimon Halippa (6 - 20 June 1927)

- Minister of Communications:

- Constantin D. Dimitriu (4 - 20 June 1927)

- Minister of Industry and Commerce:

- Ludovic Mrazec (4 - 20 June 1927)

- Minister of Public Instruction:

- Nicolae Lupu (4 - 20 June 1927)

- Minister of Religious Affairs and the Arts:

- Alexandru Lapedatu (4 - 20 June 1927)

- Minister of Agriculture and Property:

- Constantin Argetoianu (4 - 20 June 1927)

- Ministry of Labour, Social Insurance and Cooperation:

- (interim) Alexandru Lapedatu (4 - 6 June 1927)
- Grigore Iunian (6 - 20 June 1927)

- Minister of Public Health and Social Welfare:

- (interim) Nicolae Lupu (4 - 6 June 1927)
- Ion Inculeț (6 - 20 June 1927)

Preceded by Third Averescu cabinet	Cabinet of Romania; 4 June 1927 - 20 June 1927	Succeeded by Seventh Ion I. C. Brătianu cabinet
