= Seventh Ion I. C. Brătianu cabinet =

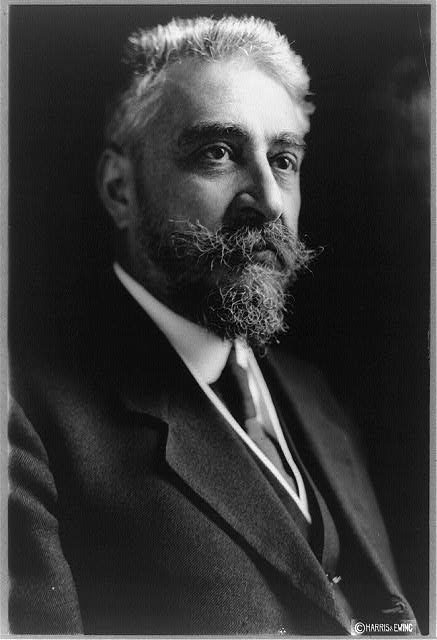
Ion I. C. Brătianu

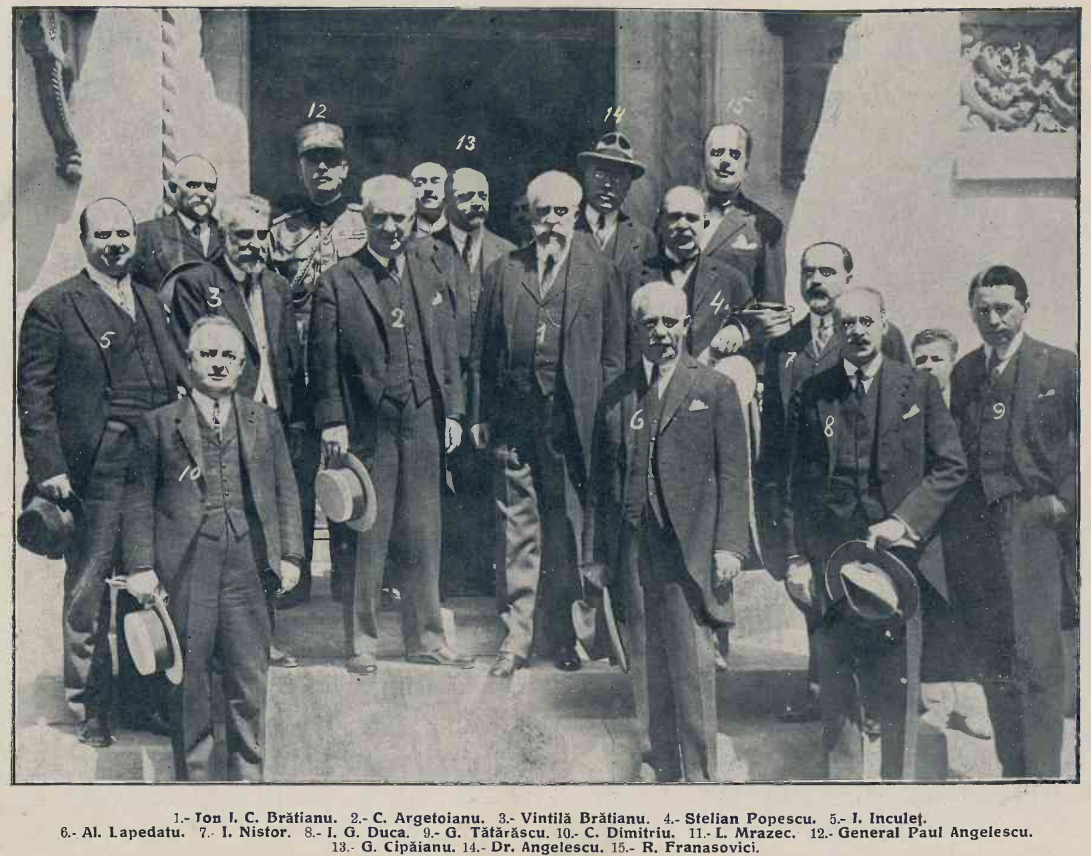
The seventh Ion I. C. Brătianu cabinet

The seventh cabinet of Ion I. C. Brătianu was the government of Romania from 21 June to 24 November 1927.

== Composition ==
The ministers of the cabinet were as follows:

- President of the Council of Ministers:

- Ion I. C. Brătianu (21 June – 24 November 1927)

- Minister of the Interior:

- Ion Gh. Duca (22 June – 24 November 1927)

- Minister of Foreign Affairs:

- Ion I. C. Brătianu (22 June – 6 July 1927)
- Nicolae Titulescu (6 July – 24 November 1927)

- Minister of Finance:

- Vintilă I.C. Brătianu (22 June – 24 November 1927)

- Minister of Justice:

- Stelian Popescu (22 June – 24 November 1927)

- Minister of War:

- Gen. Paul Angelescu (22 June – 24 November 1927)

- Minister of Public Works:

- Ion Nistor (22 June – 24 November 1927)

- Minister of Agriculture and Property:

- Constantin Argetoianu (22 June – 24 November 1927)

- Minister of Communications:

- Constantin D. Dimitriu (22 June – 24 November 1927)

- Minister of Industry and Commerce:

- Ludovic Mrazec (22 June – 24 November 1927)

- Minister of Public Instruction:

- Constantin Angelescu (22 June – 24 November 1927)

- Minister of Religious Affairs and the Arts:

- Alexandru Lapedatu (22 June – 24 November 1927)

- Minister of Public Health and Social Welfare:

- Ion Inculeț (22 June – 24 November 1927)

- Ministry of Labour, Social Insurance and Cooperation

- Nicolae Lupu (22 June – 24 November 1927)

Preceded by Știrbey cabinet	Cabinet of Romania; 21 June – 24 November 1927	Succeeded by Vintilă I. C. Brătianu cabinet
