= Vintilă I. C. Brătianu cabinet =

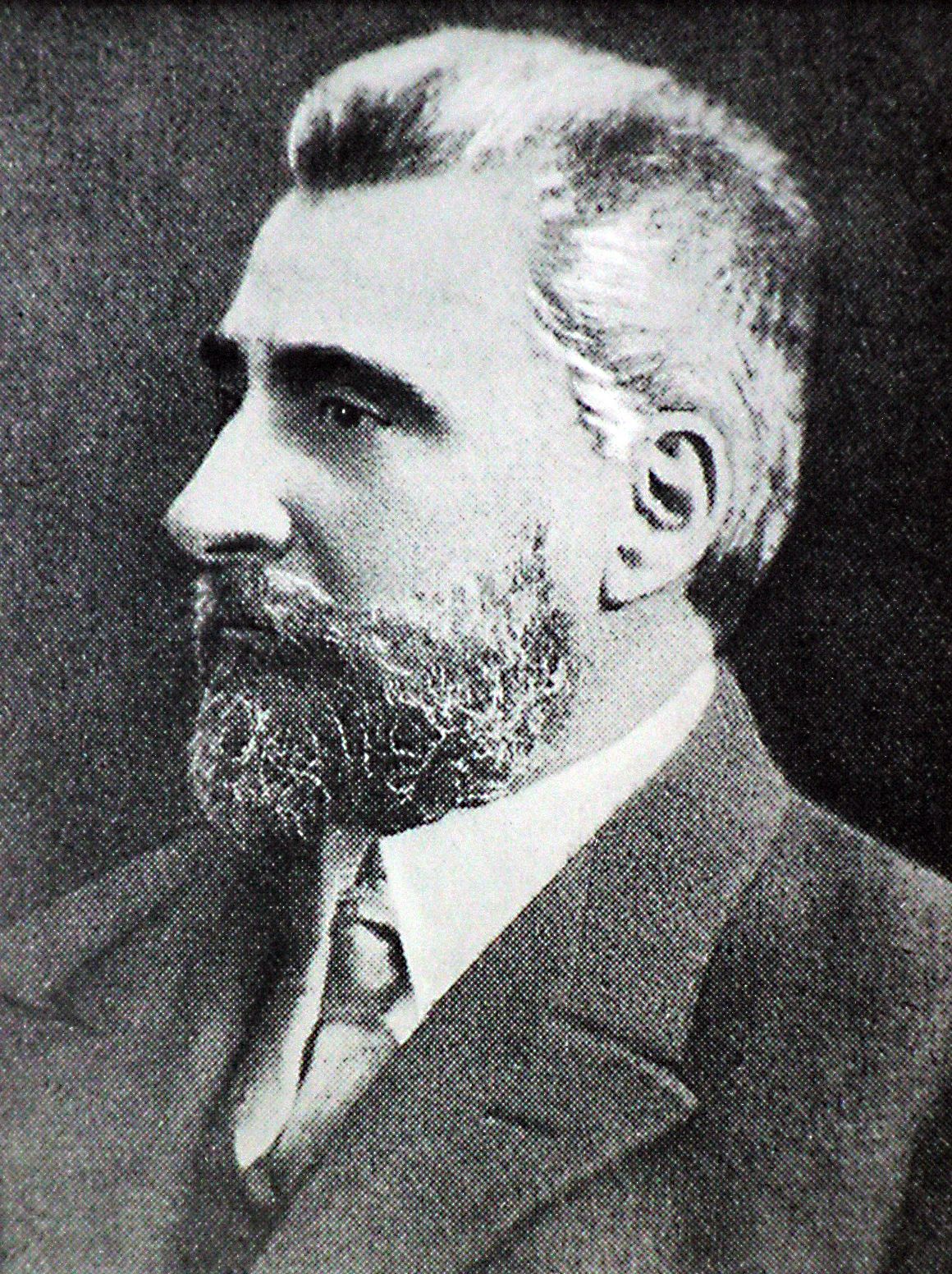
Vintilă I. C. Brătianu

The cabinet of Vintilă I. C. Brătianu was the government of Romania from 24 November 1927 to 9 November 1928.

== Composition ==
The ministers of the cabinet were as follows:

- President of the Council of Ministers:

- Vintilă I. C. Brătianu (24 November 1927 - 9 November 1928)

- Minister of the Interior:

- Ion Gh. Duca (24 November 1927 - 9 November 1928)

- Minister of Foreign Affairs:

- Nicolae Titulescu (24 November 1927 - 3 August 1928)
- (interim) Constantin Argetoianu (3 August - 9 November 1928)

- Minister of Finance:

- Vintilă I.C. Brătianu (24 November 1927 - 9 November 1928)

- Minister of Justice:

- Stelian Popescu (24 November 1927 - 9 November 1928)

- Minister of War:

- Gen. Paul Angelescu (24 November 1927 - 9 November 1928)

- Minister of Public Works:

- Ion Nistor (24 November 1927 - 9 November 1928)

- Minister of Agriculture and Property:

- Constantin Argetoianu (24 November 1927 - 9 November 1928)

- Minister of Communications:

- Constantin D. Dimitriu (24 November 1927 - 9 November 1928)

- Minister of Industry and Commerce:

- Ludovic Mrazec (24 November 1927 - 9 November 1928)

- Minister of Public Instruction:

- Constantin Angelescu (24 November 1927 - 9 November 1928)

- Minister of Religious Affairs and the Arts:

- Alexandru Lapedatu (24 November 1927 - 9 November 1928)

- Ministry of Labour, Social Insurance and Cooperation

- Nicolae Lupu (24 November 1927 - 9 November 1928)

- Minister of Public Health and Social Welfare:

- Ion Inculeț (24 November 1927 - 9 November 1928)

Preceded by Seventh Ion I. C. Brătianu cabinet	Cabinet of Romania; 24 November 1927 - 9 November 1928	Succeeded by First Maniu cabinet
