= România Renaște =

"Romania Renaissance!" Movement Mișcarea România Renaște!
- Abbreviation: MRR
- Leader: Dumitru Borțun
- Spokesperson: Alina Achim
- Founded: February 2024
- Headquarters: Mircea Eliade Avenue nr. 18, Bucharest, Romania
- Youth wing: TEAMG
- Membership: cca. 7,000
- Ideology: Anti-corruption
- Colours: Red Yellow; Blue
- Slogan: Gândește Independent! (Think Independently!)
- Constituent organisations: 2 political parties and 32 NGO

Website
- www.renasteromania.ro

The România Renaissance Movement (also translated as Romania Reborn! Movement) is a non-governmental civic-political organization in Romania, which supports an independent candidacy of Mircea Geoană in the 2024 Romanian presidential elections.

It is led by Dr. Prof. univ. Dumitru Borțun, a former presidential advisor (between 1993 and 1996) and former candidate for Mayor of Bucharest in the 2016 Romanian local election, on behalf of the Romanian Social Party (founded and led by Geoană himself).

== Mission ==
The Romania Renaissance mission declares itself a "community of patriots and democrats in the service of the nation, who want Romania to make a historic leap in development".

At the end of June, the "Romania Reborn!" Movement launched an appeal to what she considers to be "the healthy and democratic forces in Romania" to support the independent candidacy of NATO deputy secretary general Mircea Geoană. Also, the organization asked Mircea Geoană to assume a candidacy for the position of president of Romania.

== Members ==
The movement has more than 7,000 members, two parties, and 32 civic organizations and non-governmental organizations have joined so far.

- Dumitru Borțun – doctor of philosophy and professor at the Faculty of Communication and Public Relations of the National School of Political and Administrative Studies (SNSPA) in Bucharest
- Alina Achim Inayeh – former director of the Bucharest Office and the Black Sea Trust within the German Marshall Fund
- Cătălin Tomescu – Head of NATO's Southeast Multinational Corps Command between 2020 and 2022, with three stars Lieutenant General
- Cezar Gheorghe – CEO and founder of AGRIColumn
- Marius Profiroiu – professor at the Academy of Economic Studies in Bucharest
- Ștefan Busnatu – cardiologist at the "Bagdasar Arseni" Emergency Clinical Hospital, head of works and vice-dean at the Faculty of Medicine of the "Carol Davila" University of Medicine and Pharmacy (UMFCD) in Bucharest
- Ioana Mateș – lawyer
- Clara Volintiru – director of the Bucharest branches of the German Marshall Fund, respectively the Black Sea Trust (BST)
- Paula Pîrvănescu – former independent candidate in the 2024 European Parliament elections, president of the RBC Association (Romanian Business Chamber) between 2020 and 2024
- Augustin Jianu – former Minister of Communications and Information Society (January 4 – June 29, 2017), co-founder and CEO of Facem, co-founder of the Romanian startup certME
- Florentin Gust – president of the Dolj branch of the Red Cross and member of the Steering Committee of the Romanian Red Cross, PSRO deputy in the 2008–2012 and 2012–2016 legislatures, founder of Kangen Center Romania
- Radu Preda – senator in the 2016–2020 legislature
- Marius Tunduc – co-founder of Cest Pharma and president of the National Union of Columbophiles from Romania – "Columba"
- Marius Lazăr – former co-president of the Green Party, former secretary of state in the Ministry of Labour
- Mihai Apostolache – university lecturer, PSD deputy in the 2004–2008 and 2008–2012 legislatures, president of the Romania in Action Party
- Simona Neumann – former executive director of Timișoara2023
- Adrian Tudor – former deputy mayor of Târgu Jiu, executive president of Green Party
- Ioana Petrescu – Romanian economist who served as the country's Finance Minister in 2014, president of environmentalist NGO "Pur și Simplu Verde"

Party	Abbr.	Ideology	Leader
Romania in Action Party	România în Acțiune	Localism; Participatory democracy Romanian nationalism	Mihai Apostolache

== See also ==
- 2024 Romanian Presidential Election
- Mircea Geoană
- Romania Renaste (RO)
