= Boboc =

Boboc may refer to:

- A village in Cochirleanca commune, Romania
- A Romanian surname
  - Loredana Boboc, Romanian gymnast
  - Radu Boboc (born 1999), Romanian professional footballer
  - Robert Boboc (born 1995), Romanian professional footballer
  - Valeriu Boboc, victim of police brutality in Moldova
