= Post–World War II Romanian war crime trials =

Holocaust trials

Following the end of the Second World War, Romania was one of the 4 countries to be officially acknowledged as an "ally of Hitlerite Germany" by the 1947 Paris Peace Treaties (along with Bulgaria, Finland and Hungary). The treaty of peace with Romania obliged the country to apprehend and bring to trial those accused of "war crimes and crimes against peace and humanity".

Only 4 Romanian war criminals were executed (Ion Antonescu, Mihai Antonescu, Constantin Z. Vasiliu and Gheorghe Alexianu) and hundreds more were sentenced to prison or forced labor. Only slightly more than 200 Romanians were sentenced by the initial postwar trials, carried out by the "People's Tribunals". Although the two courts - based in Cluj and Bucharest - sentenced 668 people, the vast majority of these were foreigners. The Cluj tribunal sentenced only 26 Romanians, the remainder being Hungarians (370), Germans (83) and Jews (2). The Bucharest tribunal sentenced only 187 people. There were more trials concerning war crimes and "crimes against peace" after the "People's Tribunals" were disbanded, however. Romania was the only country in Eastern Europe to initiate only a small number of court proceedings against accused war criminals and collaborators. This declaration of practically singular responsibility allowed many of those guilty of war crimes and collaboration to escape justice in postwar Romania. In Czechoslovakia and Hungary, for comparison, tens of thousands were convicted and hundreds were executed. In Bulgaria, death sentences alone amounted to 2,618, of which 1,576 were carried out.

The postwar regime "went easy" on the mass of genocidal antisemites, sentencing them to relatively minor punishments. Early amnesties were often granted. For example, on 1 June 1945, Lucrețiu Pătrășcanu successfully had 29 death sentences commuted by the King. Although hundreds of high-ranking officials and officers were condemned to life or lengthy prison sentences, all who did not die in prison were released between 1958 and 1962.

== Background ==
Under Ion Antonescu's leadership, Romania joined the Tripartite Pact on 23 November 1940 as a sovereign state, took part in Operation Barbarossa as an equal partner of Germany, and was never occupied by the Wehrmacht. Hitler respected Antonescu, who led the third largest Axis force in Europe: 585,000 Romanian troops served on the Eastern Front during June-October 1941. Although not completely a voluntary partner, Romania was a partner and not a vassal, and the country remained under the control of a native ruler. After the Armistice of Cassibile in September 1943, Romania became the second Axis power in Europe.

Hungarian-American historian John Lukacs praised the August 1944 coup, writing: "In August 1944, the Rumanians executed the most successful coup d'etat during World War II. With an entire German Army in their midst, they turned around within twenty-four hours and proclaimed their alliance with the Soviet Union, Britain and the United States. (Again the comparison with Italy is instructive: compared to this acrobatic feat, the descendants of Machiavelli were mere bunglers.)".

=== The Holocaust ===
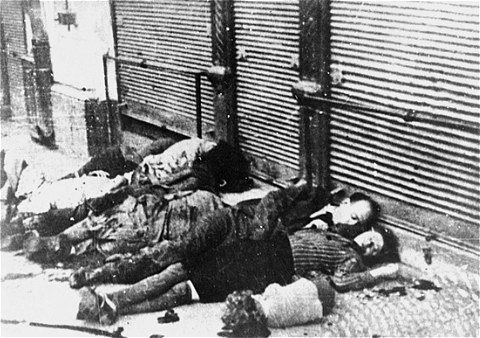
Iași pogrom in Romania, June 1941

Romania ranks first among Holocaust perpetrator countries other than Nazi Germany. The Romanian Holocaust was outside the control of the Nazis. Its beginning did not require Nazi intervention, Romania being the only ally of the Third Reich that carried out its genocidal campaign without the intervention of Heinrich Himmler's SS. The "wholesale slaughter of Jews" in Romanian-occupied Soviet territories was "a genocide operationally separate from the Nazi Final Solution". It was by far the greatest extermination of Jews by non-German forces. Romania also rejected Nazi designs on its Jews, ultimately declining to deport Romanian Jews to the Belzec concentration camp. Nevertheless, between 280,000 and 380,000 Jews died in Romanian-controlled territories. Romania even took the lead in the Holocaust for the first weeks of Operation Barbarossa. This was acknowledged by Adolf Hitler on 19 August 1941: "As far as the Jewish Question is concerned, it can now be stated with certainty that a man like Antonescu is pursuing much more radical policies in this area than we have so far.". The regime of Ion Antonescu had been killing Jewish women and children, clearing entire Jewish communities, while Nazi Germany was still massacring only Jewish men. Romania was the only country other than Germany itself that "implemented all the steps of the destruction process, from definitions to killings".

== The trials ==
=== "People's Tribunals" ===
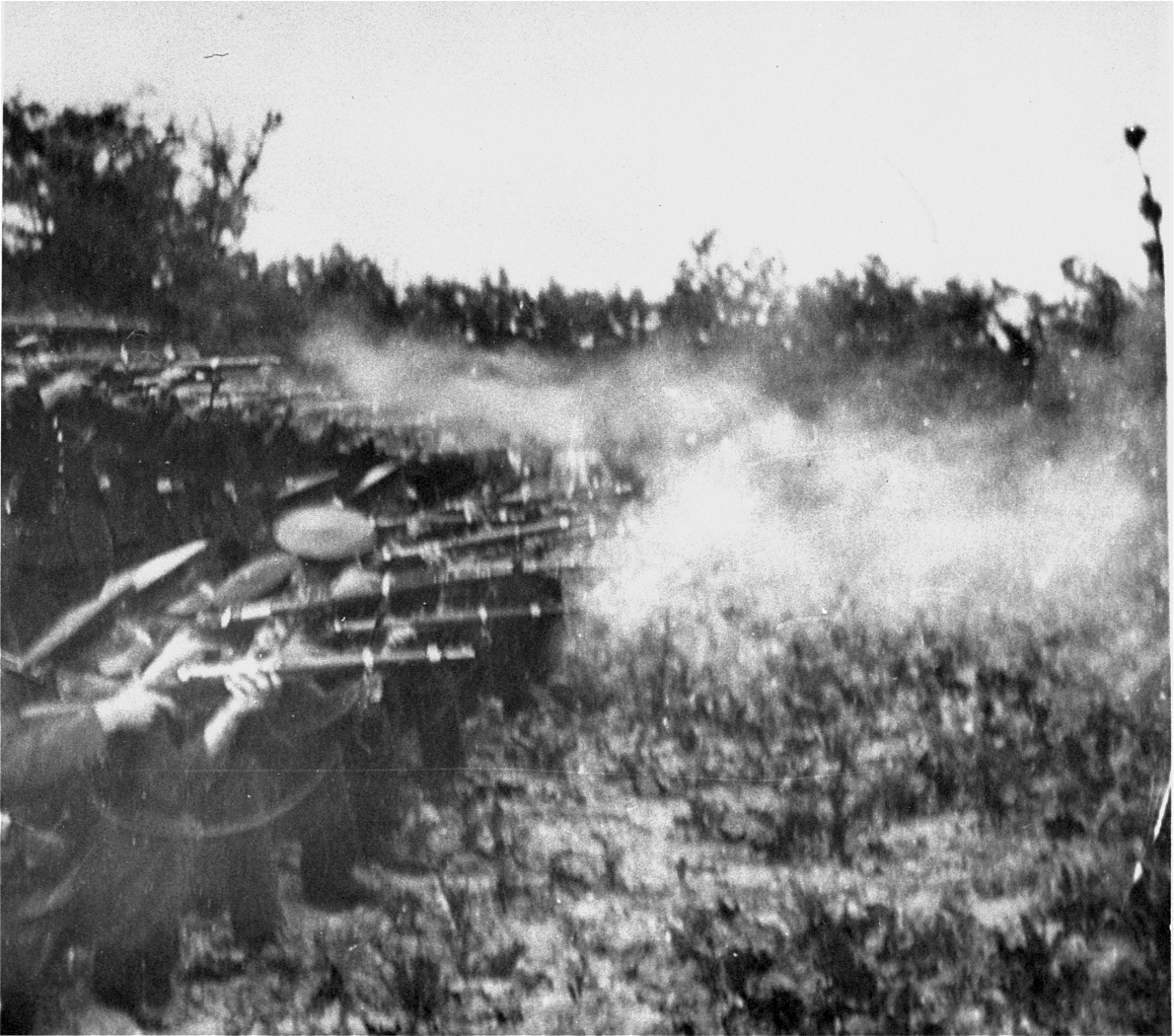
The only postwar execution of Romanian war criminals, Jilava, 1 June 1946.

The initiative to prosecute former Romanian dignitaries came from Vladislav Vinogradov, head of the Allied Commission in Romania. On 10 October 1944, Vinogradov submitted a list of 47 suspected war criminals to be apprehended. Further lists came on 18 and 20 October, and they included pre-Antonescu officials, such as prime minister Ion Gigurtu. Lucrețiu Pătrășcanu, the Communist Minister of Justice, adopted laws on the prosecution of war criminals in January 1945. The subsequent "People's Tribunals", which specifically targeted alleged war criminals, only sentenced 668 people (many of them in absentia) before their dissolution in June 1946.

The "People's Tribunals" were set up in Romania by King Michael I's decree on 21 April 1945. They were based on the Nuremberg model and had the same four categories of indictments: conspiracy to take over the country's legal government, crimes against peace, crimes of war and crimes against humanity. Some trials were still in process when the "People's Tribunals" were disbanded on 28 June 1946, so their sentences were pronounced at a later date. Most of the 668 who were sentenced by the "People's Tribunals" were Hungarian occupiers of Northern Transylvania and their collaborators rather than Romanians under Marshal Antonescu's regime. They were judged by the Cluj-based tribunal. The other tribunal, based in Bucharest, sentenced only 187 people. The two tribunals pronounced a total of 48 death sentences, but only 4 were actually carried out. Out of the 481 who were sentenced by the Cluj People's Tribunal, only 26 were Romanians. The remainder were Hungarians (370), Germans (83) and Jews (2).

After the "People's Tribunals" were liquidated in 1946, trials associated with "crimes against peace" and other war-related charges continued in the following years. Law No. 291 of 1947, on the basis of which these trials were conducted, ruled out executions. It stipulated sentences ranging from 15 years to life imprisonment.

=== The Iași trial ===
Of the 57 people who were tried in the Iași trial 12 were military personnel, 22 were gendarmes and 21 were civilians. Added to these were the prefect of Iași County and the mayor of Iași. A total of 165 witnesses, mostly survivors of the Iași pogrom, testified at the trial. Proceedings began in 1947, with 223 people initially arrested. The indictment was based on 4 major categories of arguments: rumors of Jewish cooperation with the enemy, communiques published by the authorities, army documents and orders of the local authorities forcing the Jews to hand over certain personal belongings (headlights, binoculars and cameras). The indictment stated that the victims numbered more than 10,000. This contrasted with the official line of the Antonescu government, which counted only 500 "Judeo-communists". Ultimately, 21 were sentenced to hard labor for life and 100 million lei in damages, 1 was sentenced to life sentence in harsh conditions and 100 million lei in damages, 7 were sentenced to 25 years hard labor, 11 were sentenced to 20 years of hard labor and 100 million lei in damages, 1 was sentenced to 20 years harsh sentence and 100 million lei in damages, 6 were sentenced to 15 years hard labor and 100 million lei in damages and 1 was sentenced to 5 years of forced labor. A few of the accused were acquitted.

=== The "collective responsibility" trial of Antonescu government members ===
There were 8 members of Ion Antonescu's government who were investigated in 1946, but they were acquitted by the "People's Tribunals". However, they were later tried based on the principle of "collective responsibility" and sentenced for "crimes against peace" in early 1949.

=== Other trials ===
In 1953, Colonels Radu Dinulescu and Gheorghe Petrescu were sentenced for crimes against humanity and war crimes. These included involvement in the Iași pogrom, deportation of Jews to Transnistria and inhumane treatment of civilians. Dinulescu was sentenced to 15 years of hard labor and 10 years of civic degradation and Petrescu to 10 years of hard labor and the same period of civic degradation. Their assets were also confiscated.

== Legacy ==
Unlike the postwar trials in Germany, the testimonial materials were not widely disseminated and for the most part were largely withdrawn from access. Many Romanians "saw the trials as an anti-national act, an attempt by foreigners and their aides to take their revenge against Romanians". By emphasizing "outsiders" and "retribution" as factors influencing the procedures, Romanian nationalists delegitimized the tribunals. Romania's fascist era crimes - their nature, extent and intensity - did not become part of Romania's collective self-awareness.

The 1943 Moscow Declarations, the Yalta Conference and the second paragraph of the 1945 Berlin Declaration all came together to turn the punishment of Romanian fascist leaders into an issue of "universal justice", a manifestation of the international community. As such, the trial of the Antonescu regime ought to be assessed by the same criteria used to prepare the Nuremberg indictments. However, given the way the trial was organized and pursued along with the censored press and the carefully selected audience, the full horror of the Antonescu regime's crimes against the Jews did not touch the hearts of many Romanians. In conclusion, the Soviet occupation and the Communist regime forced upon Romania prevented a genuine debate on Antonescu's regime or the issues of Romania's society and its values.

Romania has laws in place that acknowledge the outcomes of the postwar trials and make the glorification of people guilty of crimes against humanity illegal. However, there are instances in which this legislation is ignored and even actively disregarded. On Wednesday, 28 December 2022, the city council of Sector 2 (Bucharest) voted to reject the removal of a bust depicting Mircea Vulcănescu, a member of Ion Antonescu's government who was sentenced in 1946.

=== Judicial rehabilitation ===
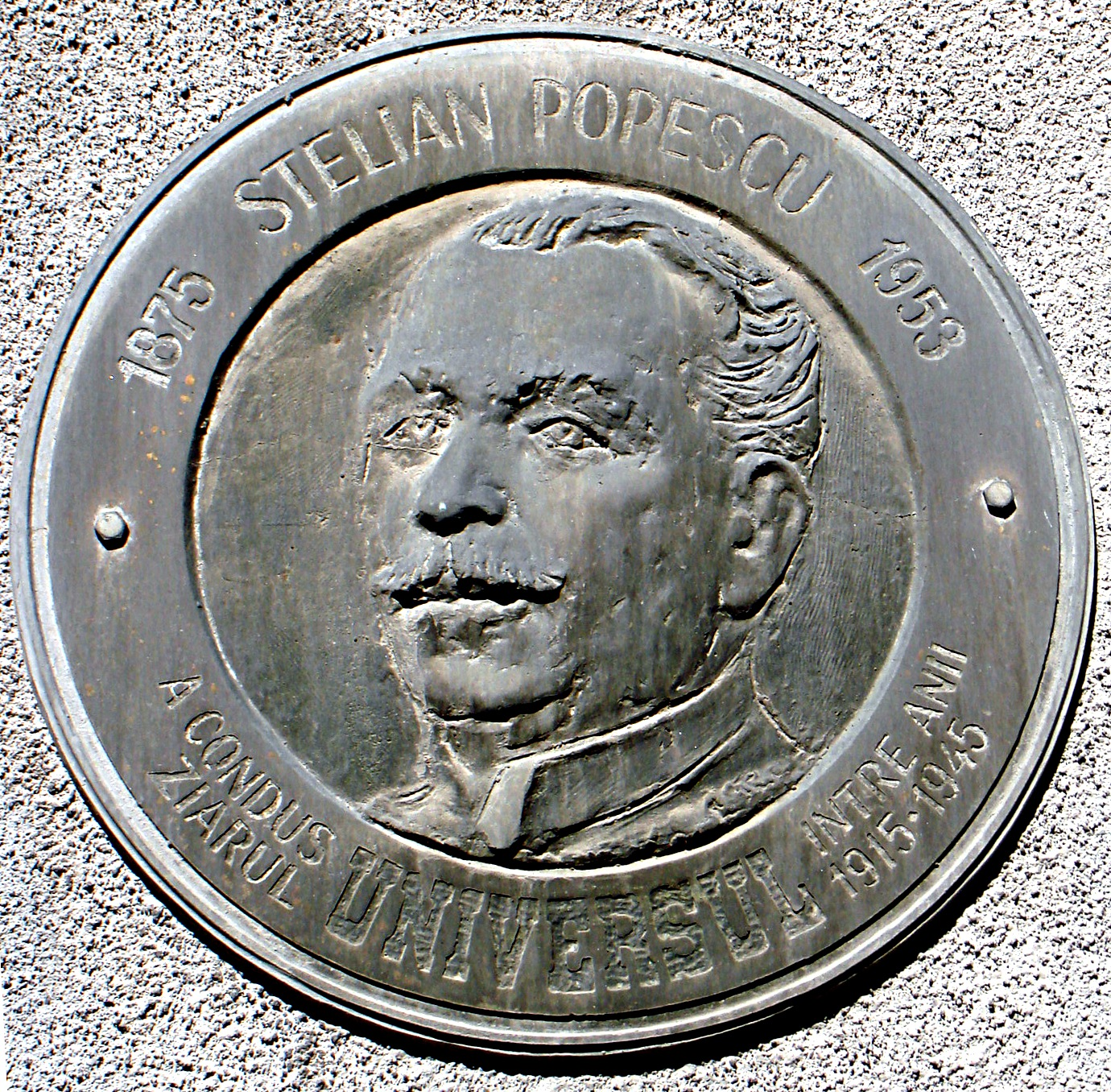
Stelian Popescu was sentenced for war crimes in 1945 and rehabilitated by the Supreme Court in 1995

On 8 May 1995, after the fall of Communism, 10 of the sentences pronounced by the "People's Tribunals" were overturned by the Supreme Court of Justice. They were part of the 14 war criminals convicted in the "Journalists' trial" of 1945. Only one of the ten, Pan M. Vizirescu, was in attendance when the proceedings took place. He was a cabinet director within the Propaganda Ministry. From 1940 to 23 August 1944, he was deputy director of the radio-journal of the Romanian Radio Broadcasting Company. Regarding his conviction, Vizirescu stated: "Knowing that this Court [the People's Court] was a terrorist organization and that the judges were mere terrorist agents, I chose not to go. I had this conscience of the truth, because they had no right to judge us - it should have been the other way around. I am now satisfied of being declared innocent and I will face God in all peace, for I was not guilty.". Attorney General Vasile Manea Drăgulin presented the convictions decided upon in 1945 as illegal, believing the interpretation of the evidence to have been “retroactive, truncated, and tendentious”, therefore amounting to a “conviction decision, whose content is a synthesis of vehement criticism of their activity, to which we forcefully ascribed the character of war crimes”. The most notorious name in this lot was likely that of Nichifor Crainic. An ardent pro-fascist and admirer of Adolf Hitler and Benito Mussolini, he was vice-president of the National Christian Party and then Antonescu's Minister of Propaganda. Crainic was also among the 10 who were rehabilitated and he was welcomed back into the Romanian Academy. Stelian Popescu and Romulus Dianu were also among the 10 who were rehabilitated, while Radu Gyr was among the remaining 4 who weren't.

Eight members of Ion Antonescu's government were sentenced in 1949 for "crimes against peace", although one of them was rehabilitated by the Supreme Court on 26 October 1998. Gheron Netta, Antonescu's last Finance Minister (1 April to 23 August, 1944), was also sentenced for "crimes against peace". He was rehabilitated on 17 January 2000 by the same court. Netta was sentenced by the "People's Tribunals" in 1946, along with most of the members of Ion Antonescu's government. Eight of them were acquitted at that time, but in 1949 they were also sentenced based on the principle of "collective responsibility".

At least two war criminals were sentenced in 1953, Radu Dinulescu ("the Eichmann of Romania") and Gheorghe Petrescu, his deputy. They were rehabilitated by the Supreme Court in 1998 and 1999, respectively.
