= Mihaela Popa =

Romanian politician (born 1962)

Member of the Senate of Romania
- Incumbent
- Assumed office 2008
- President: Traian Băsescu
- Prime Minister: Emil Boc

Member of the European Parliament
- In office 2007–2008

Personal details
- Born: 16 April 1962 (age 64) Huși, Romanian People's Republic
- Other political affiliations: Romania in Action Party

Mihaela Popa (born April 16, 1962) is a romanian politician member of Romania in Action Party. She served as a member of the European Parliament (2007–2009). Mihaela Popa has been a member of the Senate of Romania between 2008 and 2016.

== Political activity ==
=== Valeriu Boboc Prize ===
The initiative regarding founding Valeriu Boboc Prize for the liberty of press and defending of democratic values was launched on April 19, 2010, by Mihaela Popa. She said in front of the Senate that "April 7 events opened the way of Moldova to Europe and Boboc is no longer just a name, but a symbol of struggle for democratic values and freedom of expression." On April 23, the newspaper of a former ally of Communists Iurie Roşca, Flux, had a very hostile reaction to the initiative. The memorandum regarding founding the Prize "Valeriu Boboc" for the liberty of the press and for the defense of democratic values was adopted on April 30, 2010, by the permanent bureau of the Senate of Romania.
