= Stelian Popescu =

Romanian journalist

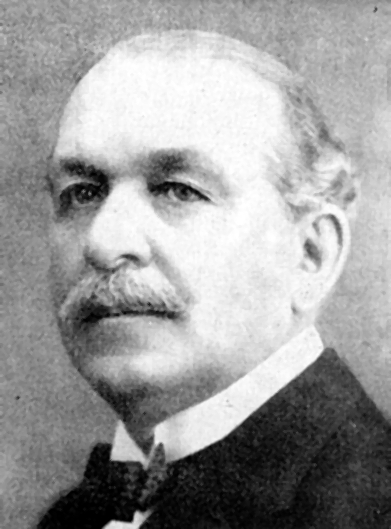
- Born: February 19, 1874; Lacu Turcului, Prahova County, Kingdom of Romania
- Died: March 8, 1954 (aged 80); Madrid, Spain
- Occupations: Journalist; judge; politician

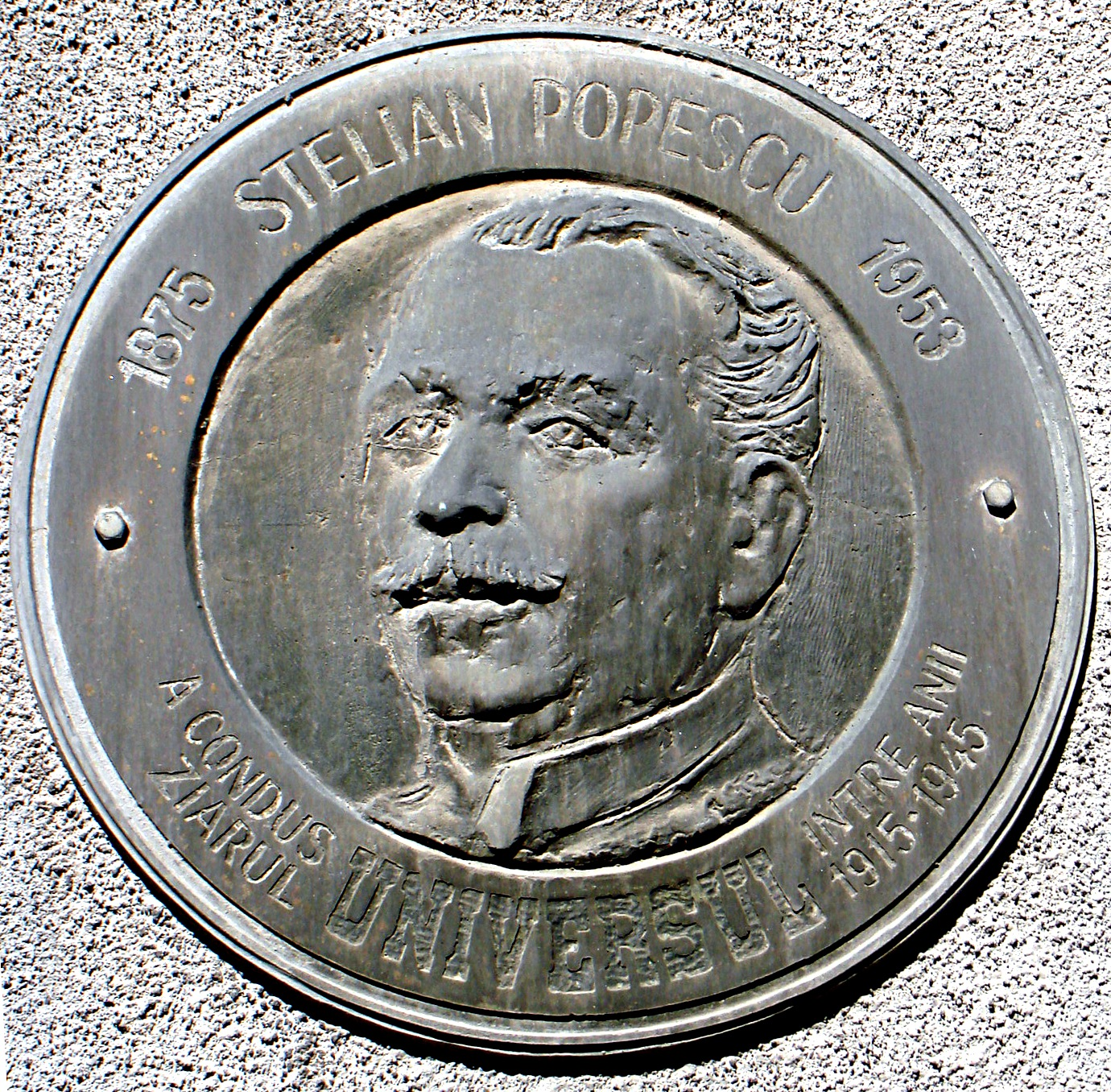
Medallion on the facade of the Universul Palace, representing the face of the journalist Stelian Popescu

Stelian Popescu (February 19, 1874 – March 8, 1954) was a nationalist Romanian journalist.

== Biography ==
He was born in Lacu Turcului, Prahova County. He was elected to Parliament many times. He was Minister of Justice in the Ionescu cabinet (December 17, 1921 – January 19, 1922), the Știrbey cabinet (June 4 – 20, 1927), the Seventh Ion I. C. Brătianu cabinet (June 22 – November 24, 1927) and the Vintilă I. C. Brătianu cabinet (November 24, 1927 – November 9, 1928).

Popescu ran the Universul newspaper from 1915 to 1945, transforming it into one of the most readable newspapers of the interwar period. Being a right-wing journalist, the newspaper remained influenced by this ideas, which attracted many adversities, especially from the social-democratic or socialist newspapers, such as the newspaper Adevărul. He criticized the governments of the time, came into conflict with King Carol II of Romania, and at the beginning of the 1940s he unconditionally supported Marshal Ion Antonescu.

On his initiative, between 1926 and 1930, the Universe Palace was built, the headquarters of the editorial and typography of the Universul newspaper.

In 1933, the "Anti-revisionist League" was founded in Romania, led by Popescu, a nationalist with an audience in Romania, who was fighting against Hungary's claims on Transylvania, in writing and in public events. The activity of the Anti-revisionist League was banned by Carol II on March 7, 1939.

In 1944 Popescu took refuge in Switzerland, the newspaper's management remaining in the hands of one of his sons-in-law, Ion Lugosianu.

After World War II, he was tried in absentia by the Bucharest People's Tribunal and sentenced on June 4, 1945 to life imprisonment. He was included in the "group of 14 journalists", along with, among others, Pamfil Șeicaru, Nichifor Crainic, and Radu Gyr. All were accused that "through newspaper articles, brochures or conferences, they were serving Fascist or Hitlerist propaganda or they contributed by their action to support a hateful regime and a bad foreign policy, a policy that had to have the consequences of Romania implication in a disastrous adventure and the political and military collapse of the country".

Popescu died on March 8, 1954, in Madrid, Spain.

Before the war, his influence had become so great that his hometown was renamed "Stelian Popescu" by the Liberal government. Regarding this naming, Marta Breaban wrote the following in her journal: “It was called Stelian Popescu because the director of the Universe newspaper at that time was born in this commune, his father being a priest here. In his native village, Stelian Popescu built the church, school, town hall and dispensary. The church was painted by the painter Norocea who followed the design of Curtea de Argeș.”

Popescu had a house in Bucharest, on Dionisie Lupu street (today Tudor Arghezi) no. 10 bis, built in 1911, that was built according to the design of architect Paul Smarandescu.

Popescu also had a villa in Balchik, built in 1936 by the architect Henrieta Delavrancea-Gibory. The villa was demolished in 2009, because it was inclined due to the settlement of the land, and on that land a hotel was built.

In 1933 Eustațiu Stoenescu painted a portrait of Popescu.

The Student House of Culture in Bucharest, on Calea Plevnei, was built by public subscription of Popescu, who donated it to the University, on November 18, 1937, with the same destination that it has today.

On 8 May 1995, after the fall of Communism, 10 of the sentences pronounced during the Post-World War II Romanian war crime trials were overturned by the Supreme Court of Justice. They were part of the 14 war criminals convicted in the "Journalists' trial" of 1945. Attorney General Vasile Manea Drăgulin presented the convictions decided upon in 1945 as illegal, believing the interpretation of the evidence to have been “retroactive, truncated, and tendentious”, therefore amounting to a “conviction decision, whose content is a synthesis of vehement criticism of their activity, to which we forcefully ascribed the character of war crimes”. Stelian Popescu was among the 10 who were rehabilitated.
