= Death of Valeriu Boboc =

Protester who died in police custody

Valeriu Boboc OR
- Born: May 5, 1985; Bubuieci, Moldavian SSR, Soviet Union
- Died: April 8, 2009 (aged 23); Chișinău, Moldova
- Cause of death: Head trauma
- Resting place: Bubuieci; 46°59′N 28°57′E
- Education: "Miguel de Cervantes" High School Chișinău
- Spouse: Natalia Boboc (b. 1988)
- Children: 1
- Parent(s): Ala and Victor Boboc
- Awards: Moldova's Order of the Republic

Valeriu Boboc (5 May 1985 – 8 April 2009) was a protester who died in police custody amid the post-election protests in Chișinău, Moldova. The initial official cause was smoke poisoning from the riot, but his family insisted that he was beaten to death by the police, his body being full of contusions. According to 2009 Human Rights Report of the United States Department of State, a British forensics expert examined Boboc's body after it was exhumed on June 15, 2009, and concluded that Boboc was killed by severe blows to his head. Only after a new ruling coalition came to power, an investigation was opened into the case and a policeman was arrested on charges of Boboc's murder.

Valeriu Boboc was posthumously decorated, by a presidential decree, with Moldova's highest state decoration – the Order of the Republic. "April 7 events opened the way of Moldova to Europe and Boboc became a symbol of struggle for democratic values and freedom of expression." In 2010, the "Valeriu Boboc" Prize was established by the Senate of Romania for "defending the fundamental human rights and democratic values", but as of 2017 has never been awarded.

== Biography ==
He was born on May 5, 1985, in Bubuieci (a Chișinău suburban community), to Victor Boboc, a history teacher and Ala Boboc, a Romanian language teacher. But the poverty has radically changed the situation in his family, his father working as taxi driver and his mother, Ala Boboc, became unemployed. Valeriu Boboc graduated from "Miguel de Cervantes" High School Chișinău and attended International Relations Institute of Moldova for one year. He left university because he didn't have three thousand lei to pay the study contract. Looking to find a better paid work, he tried to leave for Russia, but failed. He worked at a car wash, a car service and then sold belts at market. In the same place was selling clothes Natalia, whom he married in 2007. Valeriu Boboc lived in an apartment in Bubuieci, with his wife, his child Dragoș (born July 30, 2007), his brother Marcel and parents. Some claim he was known at local city police stations as a passive addict and a hooligan.

== Reactions to the death ==
After the results of the April 2009 Moldovan parliamentary election were announced, he was a peaceful participant at the protest. Boboc arrived in the Square after 5.00 p.m., when the presidential and parliament buildings were being ravaged. Following his arrest, Valeriu Boboc died in a Chișinău hospital on 8 April 2009.

Boboc was pronounced dead in the early hours of April 8 at a Chisinau hospital. The official cause of death was given as inhalation of poisonous gas. His case was reopened after the current ruling coalition won elections in July. The police declared he died of smoke inhalation from the riot, but his family claims that he was beaten to death by the police, his body being full of contusions.

Valeriu Boboc was killed intentionally, said Valeriu Pleșca, the lawyer of the family of Boboc. According to a witness who witnessed the death of Valeriu Boboc, "On the night of April 8, Valeriu Boboc and other men were peacefully sitting near the Triumph Arch in Chisinau's downtown, watching the events on the Great National Assembly Square. Suddenly we were surrounded by 50 armed policemen. The police ordered us to lay on the ground and started to beat us with clubs, legs and weapons," the lawyer read out from the witness's testimonies. The lawyer of the family of Boboc Valeriu Pleșca was called to lay testimonies on June 1, 2009. Damian Hancu, the man who witnessed the death of Valeriu Boboc, declared he could identify the policemen who beat him and Boboc.

"It was around 2 AM. We've heard an information on the radio that someone had found a person with a bullet wound in the Cathedral Square. That was the initial version regarding Valeriu Boboc's death", declared former vice-minister of Internal Affairs, Ghenadie Coșovan. He was surprised about the first declarations made by former minister of Health Larisa Catrinici, that Valeriu Boboc has died due to intoxication, said Ghenadie Coșovan.

The body of Valeriu Boboc was handed to the relatives by the police on April 12 and was buried on the same day. Dorin Chirtoacă, the mayor of Chișinău and vice-president of the Liberal Party, attended Boboc's funerals. The opposition parties subsequently used his death as an important subject during the July 2009 electoral campaign.

The police declared he was found dead in the Great National Assembly Square. According to the official investigation, he died of inhaling a toxic gas, his death certificate stating as cause "poisoning with an unknown substance". The Boboc family and the lawyers disputed this, claiming instead that the young man was beaten to death while in custody. Moldova's Attorney General however noted that the bruises and bleeding traces on Boboc's body were not a cause of his death. The body of Valeriu Boboc was exhumed at the cemetery of Bubuieci on June 15, 2009, for further investigations.

During a protest gathering around 3,000 in the city's central square on April 12, 2009, Dorin Chirtoacă called for a moment of silence in memory of Valeriu Boboc.

On April 12, the spokeswoman of the Interior Ministry, Ala Meleca, has denied media reports blaming the police for the death of Boboc. Ministry of Internal Affairs (Moldova) released a statement on April 12, 2009, saying an autopsy showed that Boboc had a broken rib, but that his death had not been caused by the injury. "Doctors think that the young man was poisoned by unknown substances," the statement said. "Prosecutors are ready for an international probe in order to exclude other interpretations of this fact."

"In connection with the multiple rumors related to the death of the citizen Valeriu Boboc, the Press Service of the Prosecutor Office is in right to inform the following. On April 8, at 1.15 am, V. Boboc died on his way to the Emergency Hospital. According to the results of the autopsy, the body injuries and namely a broken rib have no causative connection with the cause of death. According to the doctors, he was subject to intoxication with an unknown substance. In order to exclude any doubts related to the cause of death, the prosecutors are ready to call an international expertise."

A silent protest was held in Dublin city centre on April 13, 2009, in memory of Valeriu Boboc.

An open letter from the mayor of Chișinău, Dorin Chirtoacă, circulated on 14 April showed disturbing photos of Valeriu Boboc.

On April 17, 2009, Amnesty International wrote: "Valeriu Boboc reportedly died during the demonstrations on 7 April. There are conflicting reports as to the cause of his death. The General Prosecutor's Office has reported that his death was due to poisoning with unknown substances, while his family allege that he died as a result of injuries inflicted by the police."

Between April 17 to June 8, 2009, lawyers Veaceslav Țurcan and Valeriu Pleșca of the family of the victim submitted many requests for the exhumation of Boboc, but they received 12 letters of denial. Later, after attacking the Prosecution in court, they got right to the exhumation and the expertise of a specialist from the UK.

One day after a member of the Institute for Human Rights, an NGO that assisted victims of torture, had called a London-based pathologist seeking assistance in investigating the death of Valeriu Boboc, the prosecutor's office called Boboc's father and promised to bring in the same pathologist to investigate the case. That is an evidence that his phone was tapped.

The body of Valeriu Boboc was exhumed at the cemetery of Bubueci on 15 June 2009. The exhumation lasted nearly 2 hours, and was held in the presence of the Boboc family's two lawyers, the prosecutor conducting the Boboc case, and an expert from Great Britain. The coffin was delivered to a Chisinau morgue, where the body was subjected to a thorough forensic examination to establish the true reason of the young man's death. The British expert Derrick John Pounde (born February 25, 1949) played a key role in the work.

On June 22, 2009, "Amnesty International welcomes the fact that the Moldovan authorities have invited an international forensic expert to take part in the autopsy of Valeriu Boboc, who died during the demonstrations on 7 April under disputed circumstances, but calls on the authorities to ensure that all cases of alleged police ill-treatment are promptly, independently, impartially and thoroughly investigated and that anyone reasonably identified as responsible is brought to justice, in accordance with Moldova's obligations under international human rights law."

Even if Professor John Pounder Derrik presented on June 29, 2009, to the Prosecutor Ion Matiușenco his report, the access of the lawyers to it was delayed.

On July 9, 2009, the Prosecutor General Valeriu Gurbulea said that on the night of April 8, Boboc was taken from the Great National Assembly Square, was taken to the Emergency Hospital in a police car and the doctors established that he was dead. "Legal action was immediately taken over this case," Gurbulea said

On July 24, 2009, the Prosecutor General Valeriu Gurbulea said no policeman who maltreated protesters had been identified yet. Neither is it known who killed Boboc. One of the reasons is that policemen were wearing masks.

Two days after July 2009 election, Ion Matiușenco, the prosecutor investigating Boboc's case, resigned on July 31 and was replaced by another prosecutor. But at year's end there were no further developments in the case.

When the ruling coalition Alliance for European Integration came to power, it promised to tell the whole truth about the April 2009 unrest.

On October 8, 2009, hundreds of people came to the Stephen the Great Monument in Chișinău to mark 6 months from the bloody events. While he was attending the ceremony, the prime minister Vlad Filat, expressed condolences to Victor Boboc, the father of Valeriu Boboc. Filat also said that the Ministry of the Interior has already started a domestic investigation into the police's actions on April 7, 2009, and especially during subsequent days and weeks.

After December 2009, Dragoș Boboc, Valeriu Boboc's son, will monthly receive 1000 lei from Mihai Ghimpu's salary. This action will continue as long as his interim mandate of acting President of Moldova is valid.

On October 2, 2009, the Prosecutor General Valeriu Gurbulea resigned. "Foreign and national experts determined the death was as a result of injuries caused to Valeriu Boboc and not caused by an unknown, poisoning gas, as was said immediately after the tragedy," said the new Prosecutor General Valeriu Zubco in January 2010.

According to 2009 Human Rights Report of the United States Department of State, released on March 11, 2010:

NGOs accused police of beating to death Valeriu Boboc, age 23, during demonstrations at the parliament building and presidency on the night of April 7–8. Witnesses reported seeing police beat Boboc in front of the main government building with truncheons and rifle butts. A British forensics expert examined Boboc's body after it was exhumed on June 15 and concluded that Boboc was killed by severe blows to his head, which provoked a "diffuse injury of the brain" shortly before his death. Experts working for the PCRM government, however, concluded that Boboc's head and facial injuries could not have led to his death and at first attributed his death to poisoning by an unknown gas. The COE Commissioner for Human Rights noted that the injuries revealed in the autopsy "clearly indicate that the person was beaten" but concluded that "it was not certain whether the beating alone was the cause of death." Ion Matiușenco, the prosecutor investigating Boboc's case, resigned on July 31 and was replaced by another prosecutor. At year's end there were no further developments in the case.

On March 22, 2010, former President Vladimir Voronin said during a televised interview with Lorena Bogza on ProTV that Valeriu Boboc was beaten and then thrown out of a Parliament window. "We can say without exaggeration that Valeriu Boboc's death is on the consciousness of Vladimir Filat and his comrades" wrote on April 2, 2010 Iurie Roșca, a deputy president of Parliament during the riots.

More information appeared one year after the April events, on Valeriu Boboc's death. Dorin Chirtoacă, the mayor of Chisinau, declared on March 23, 2010, that he has certain information on the abuses of April 7 from one source inside the Minister of Interior Affairs. Almost 60 policemen, dressed as civilians, received an order from the present police commissar, Serghei Cociorva, to arrest those who were between the Puskin street and the Parliament", said Chirtoaca.

On April 5, 2010, acting President Mihai Ghimpu and Chisinau Mayor Dorin Chirtoacă showed journalists a videotape of 2009 protests. In one scene on the videotape, several men are shown kicking what appears to be an unconscious man lying on the pavement in Chisinau's main square. Ghimpu and Chirtoaca said the assailants were policemen in plain clothes and the man they were attacking was Boboc.

On April 6, 2010, the president of police officers union "Demnitate", Mihai Lașcu, stated Valeriu Boboc was criminally investigated for drugs` storage and robbery. He said that he would not accept that a citizen who is criminally investigated for drugs` storage and robbery to receive the medal "Honor Order".

A year after Boboc's death, General Prosecutor's office announced on April 6, 2010, that they arrested the supposed murderer, a collaborator of the General Police Commissariat. The Moldovan prosecutor's office announced on April 7, 2010, that Ion Perju has been charged with killing 27-year-old Valeriu Boboc on April 7, 2009. Moldovan Interior Minister Victor Catan confirmed the arrest and he said more arrests will follow, but did not elaborate. On June 18, 2010, the warrant for the home arrest of suspended police officer Ion Perju was extended by the Buiucani District Court for another 90 days.

On the death of the citizen Valeriu Boboc, criminal proceedings were initiated under Article 151 paragraph (4) and Article 328 paragraph (3) point d) of the Criminal Code.

The initiative regarding founding the Prize "Valeriu Boboc" for the liberty of press and defending of democratic values was launched on April 19, 2010, by the Romanian senator Mihaela Popa. She said in front of the Senate that "April 7 events opened the way of Moldova to Europe and Boboc is no longer just a name, but a symbol of struggle for democratic values and freedom of expression." On April 23, the newspaper of a former ally of Communists Iurie Roșca, Flux, had a very hostile reaction to the initiative. The memorandum regarding founding the Prize "Valeriu Boboc" for the liberty of press and defending of democratic values was adopted on April 30, 2010, by the permanent bureau of the Romanian Senate.

A moment of silence was held for Boboc on May 5, 2010 (his birthday) in the Romanian Senate.

On June 9, 2010, the Buiucani district court released former deputy police commissioner Iacob Gumeniță from home arrest and allowing him to be 'investigated at liberty' with respect to his role in the events of April 7 / 8 2009.

As of November 2010, the case is still ongoing.

In October 2011, the mayor Dorin Chirtoacă required to be prepared a memorial plaque in memory of Valeriu Boboc, mounted in where the young man was killed.

Former Interior Minister Gheorghe Papuc and former police commissioner general, Vladimir Botnari – accused by prosecutors of misconduct in office during the events of April 2009 that killed young Boboc – were acquitted on December 29, 2011.

== Awards ==
On April 7, 2010, Boboc was posthumously awarded the country's highest award, the Order of the Republic (Moldova).

On November 3, 2009, "Liberty prize" for year 2009 was posthumously offered to Valeriu Boboc. "Liberty prize" (Premiul Libertății) is offered annually by the newspaper Jurnal de Chișinău since 2009.

== Legacy ==
Dorin Chirtoacă, the mayor of Chișinău and vice-president of the Liberal Party, attended Boboc's funerals. The opposition parties subsequently used his death as an important subject during the July 2009 electoral campaign.

On October 8, 2009, hundreds of people came to the Stephen the Great Monument in Chișinău to mark 6 months from the bloody events. While he was attending the ceremony, the prime minister Vlad Filat, expressed condolences to Victor Boboc, the father of Valeriu Boboc. Filat also said that the Ministry of the Interior has already started a domestic investigation into the police's actions on April 7, 2009, and especially during subsequent days and weeks.

A year after Boboc's death, General prosecution announced on April 6, 2010, that they had arrested the supposed murderer, a collaborator of the General Police Commissariat.

== "Valeriu Boboc" Prize ==
The memorandum regarding founding the Prize "Valeriu Boboc" for the liberty of press and defending of democratic values was adopted on April 30, 2010, by the permanent bureau of the Romanian Senate. The initiative was launched on April 19, 2010, by the Romanian senator Mihaela Popa. The prize "Valeriu Boboc" will be given each year, during a symposium, organized by the Romanian Senate, in April, on the topic "Defending the fundamental human rights and democratic values".
