= Romulus Dianu =

- Born: March 22, 1905; Bucharest, Romania
- Died: August 25, 1975 (aged 70); Bucharest, Socialist Republic of Romania
- Education: Faculty of Letters of the University of Bucharest
- Occupations: journalist translation diplomat novella
- Writing career
- Language: romanian language

Romulus Dianu (born Romulus Dima; March 22, 1905–August 25, 1975) was a Romanian prose writer, journalist and translator.

== Biography ==
Born in Bucharest, his parents were Căile Ferate Române worker Gheorghe Dima, a relative of composer Gheorghe Dima; and his wife Virgilia (née Maiorescu), descended from the family of Petru Maior. After attending primary school in Murfatlar and Bârlad, he enrolled in the classics section of his native city's Saint Sava National College, thanks to the help of his uncle, poet George Tutoveanu. In 1925, he entered the literature and philosophy faculty of the University of Bucharest. He made his published debut in Rampa in 1926, with opinion pieces. His first book appeared in 1929; co-written with Sergiu Dan, it was a fictionalized biography titled Viața minunată a lui Anton Pann. Dan was his best friend, and he was also very close to Ion Vinea and Pamfil Șeicaru. He wrote the novels Adorata (1930) and Nopți la Ada-Kaleh (1931) in the prevailing serialized style of the day.

Dianu then entered the diplomatic field, working as Nicolae Titulescu's secretary for a decade and receiving accreditation from the League of Nations. During World War II, he wrote regularly for the official press. Following the war and the onset of a Romanian Communist Party-led government, he was sent to prison for his journalistic activity. After being released, he worked as a day laborer, woodcutter and book peddler. Found by Ion Caraion selling books in a passageway, he was able to retire and secure a pension from the Romanian Writers' Union upon the latter's proposal. He wrote three novels during the last five years of his life. He translated Fyodor Dostoyevsky, Bertolt Brecht and Georges Duhamel.

On 8 May 1995, after the fall of Communism, 10 of the sentences pronounced during the Post-World War II Romanian war crime trials were overturned by the Supreme Court of Justice. They were part of the 14 war criminals convicted in the "Journalists' trial" of 1945. Attorney General Vasile Manea Drăgulin presented the convictions decided upon in 1945 as illegal, believing the interpretation of the evidence to have been “retroactive, truncated, and tendentious”, therefore amounting to a “conviction decision, whose content is a synthesis of vehement criticism of their activity, to which we forcefully ascribed the character of war crimes”. Dianu was among the 10 who were rehabilitated.

== Literary activity ==
The literature written by Romulus Dianu is highlighted by epic verve and a fast notation, "made from the flight of the pen". The writer presents a conventional, slightly cosmopolitan and exotic environment, showing an intellectual curiosity about the mystery of the eternal feminine. His characters, such as Victoria Gherman in the novel Adorata (1930) and to some extent those in Nights at Ada-Kaleh (1932) and the Girls' Fair. Simple Mental Journey (1933), I feel the need for absolute erotic fulfillment.
