= Opinion polling for the 2024 Romanian presidential election =

In preparation for the next presidential election in Romania, which took place on November 24 (first round) and second round which would have taken place on December 8, 2024, various polling companies and organizations in Romania conducted a series of opinion polls to measure and track voting intentions of the electorate.

== Second round ==
=== Georgescu vs Lasconi (annulled) ===
Poll	Date	Sample	Georgescu Ind.	Lasconi USR
IRES	17 - 20 Dec 2024	1,000	48.0	29.0
AtlasIntel	28 Nov–5 Dec 2024	5.505	46.4	48.6
Sociopol	3–4 Dec 2024	1.200	63.0	37.0
AtlasIntel	1–4 Dec 2024	2.116	47.0	43.8
Curs	1 Dec 2024	24.629	57.8	42.2
Sociopol	27–29 Nov 2024	1.000	60.0	40.0
AtlasIntel	26–28 Nov 2024	2.116	45.3	47.5

== First round ==
=== After the deadline for submitting candidacies to BEC (5 October 2024) ===
Poll	Date	Sample	Georgescu Ind.	Lasconi USR	Ciolacu PSD	Simion AUR	Ciucă PNL	Geoană Ind.	Kelemen UDMR	Diaconescu Ind.	Terhes PNCR	Birchall Ind.	Orban FD	Others
Election (annulled first round)	24 Nov 2024	9.242.186	22.94	19.17	19.14	13.86	8.78	6.32	4.50	3.10	1.04	0.46	0.22	0.48
AtlasIntel	20–22 Nov 2024	1.692	8.1	17.8	23.7	16.9	14.3	6.9	2.9	6.2	1.0	0.7	0.8	0.7
Verifield for USR	20–21 Nov 2024	1.803	10.6	19.0	24.5	19.0	8.6	7.9	3.4	5.1	0.7	0.6	—	0.6
AtlasIntel	15–20 Nov 2024	2.003	6.2	15.3	24.3	15.4	12.1	7.0	5.9	3.3	2.1	4.2	1.5	2.7
INSOMAR	14–20 Nov 2024	1.042	6.8	12.7	24.4	16.2	15.6	8.4	3.6	4.4	3.8	—	—	—
Verifield for USR	8–14 Nov 2024	968	4.9	17.1	26.3	18.8	7.3	8.1	4.7	6.8	2.8	—	1.1	2.1
INSCOP	7–12 Nov 2024	1.100	5.4	14.3	25.3	19.1	9.1	13.3	4.1	4.6	2.1	0.8	1.0	0.6
BCS	7–10 Nov 2024	1.157	5.8	14.3	27.1	11.9	17.7	7.6	5.7	4.9	2.9	0.5	1.0	—
Sociopol	4–8 Nov 2024	1.001	—	12.0	29.0	21.0	15.0	9.0	2.0	9.0	3.0	—	—	—
CIRA	1–6 Nov 2024	1.150	1.0	16.0	29.0	17.0	19.0	9.0	1.0	—	—	1.0	—	—
Verifield for USR	1–6 Nov 2024	1.064	4.6	15.7	25.9	21.2	8.5	13.2	2.9	4.4	0.3	1.2	1.1	1.0
CURS	30 Oct–5 Nov	1.067	—	12.0	28.0	17.0	17.0	9.0	5.0	5.0	4.0	2.0	—	1.0
Argument	18-23 Oct 2024	1.100	—	15.9	26.8	18.4	12.9	14.6	1.3	4.8	0.4	0.5	0.7	3.6
Sociopol	14-18 Oct 2024	1.003	1.0	13.0	26.0	20.0	17.0	10.0	2.0	9.0	1.0	—	1.0	—
INSCOP	11-18 Oct 2024	1.106	—	15.0	24.1	20.7	8.2	18.1	3.8	5.1	1.9	0.9	1.9	0.3
CURS	11-16 Oct 2024	1.006	—	14.0	26.0	17.0	15.0	15.0	2.0	5.0	2.0	2.0	2.0	2.0
Verifield for USR	7-9 Oct 2024	1.009	—	17.1	23.4	19.8	6.2	17.2	3.8	7.6	3.1	0.7	0.7	0.4
Sociopol	7-9 Oct 2024	1.004	2.0	12.0	26.0	19.0	17.0	10.0	2.0	9.0	2.0	2.0	1.0	—

=== Before the deadline for submitting candidacies to BEC (5 October 2024) ===
Poll	Date	Sample	Geoană Ind.	Ciolacu PSD	Simion AUR	Ciucă PNL	Șoșoacă S.O.S.	Drulă/Lasconi USR	Kelemen UDMR	Cioloș REPER	Kövesi Ind.	Others
INSOMAR-Avangarde	15–27 Sep 2024	1.100	15.0	30.0	11.0	17.0	7.0	14.0	2.0	—	—	— (Note: Cristian Diaconescu (Ind.): 2%, Cristian Terheș (PNCR): 1%)
CURS	10–23 Sep 2024	1.067	16.0	29.0	11.0	18.0	7.0	12.0	—	—	—	— (Note: Cristian Diaconescu (Ind.): 4%, Cristian Terheș (PNCR): 2%)
INSCOP	11–16 Sep 2024	1.102	20.8	20.5	12.4	5.6	12.5	16.0	3.6	—	—	— (Note: Cristian Diaconescu (Ind.): 4,5%, Cristian Terheș (PNCR: 2,0%, Ana Birchall (Ind.): 0,9%)
FlashData	5–13 Sep 2024	1.100	16.0	24.0	19.0	13.0	8.0	13.0	—	—	—	7.0
Sociopol	26 Aug-3 Sep 2024	1,005	14.0	26.0	19.0	10.0	9.0	14.0	1.0	—	—	— (Note: Cristian Diaconescu (IND): 7%)
Verifield for USR	Aug 2024	—N/a	21.0	17.2	14.1	7.3	13.9	15.3	2.3			8.8
The Center for International Research and Analyses	24–30 Aug 2024	1,099	14.0	25.0	13.0	16.0	11.0	13.0	3.0	—	—	5.0 (Note: Ludovic Orban (FD): 1%, Cozmin Gușă (IND): 1%)
CURS	6–22 Aug 2024	1,067	15.0	32.0	14.0	19.0	5.0	11.0	—	—	—	4.0
ARA for Antena3	9–26 Jul 2024	1,009	20.0	28.0	10.0	6.0	12.0	12.0	—	—	—	14.0
CURS	18–26 Jul 2024	1,067	15.0	31.0	15.0	19.0	4.0	12.0	3.0	—	—	—
Sociopol	9–17 Jul 2024	1,002	15.0	25.0	19.0	12.0	9.0	14.0	1.0	—	—	— (Note: Cristian Diaconescu (IND): 5.0)
CURS	26 Jun–2 Jul 2024	1,067	17.0	30.0	13.0	20.0	6.0	9.0	3.0	—	—	2.0
INSCOP	19–27 June 2024	1,100	26.7	17.8	11.2	11.9	13.4	14.3	3.4	—	—	1.2
CSPS	June 2024	1,013	24.0	16.0	28.0	6.0	4.0	17.0	5.0	—	—	—
INSCOP	20–25 May 2024	1,100	23.7	18.2	13.5	11.5	12.5	8.6	5.5	—	—	6.4
AtlasIntel	5–9 April 2024	1,764	33.6	—	11.8	—	10.7	10.9	1.4	6.9	—	—
AtlasIntel	5–9 April 2024	1,764	27	9.6	12.6	5	10.6	11.3	0.7	6.1	—	—
AtlasIntel	5–9 April 2024	1,764	27.3	9.2	12.4	—	9.8	13.6	3.0	6.4	—	—
INSCOP	14 Feb–5 Mar 2024	2,000	26.0	24.0	13.0	12.0	8.0	—	3.0	—	9.0	—
INSCOP Research	16–24 Jan 2024	1,100	26.5	18.9	13.3	11.4	14.0	5.9	3.6	5.1	—	1.3
Snap Market Research	3–8 Jan 2024	998	12	29	13	8	14	— (Note: In this scenario, USR, PMP, FD and REPER are supporting Kövesi as an independent candidate)	5	—	10 (Note: In this scenario, USR, PMP, FD and REPER are supporting Kövesi as an independent candidate)	9 (Note: Dan Chitic (BSR): 7%)

=== Opinion polls with Geoană (2023) ===
Poll	Date	Sample	Geoană Ind.	Ciucă PNL	Ciolacu PSD	Drulă USR	Lasconi USR	Kelemen UDMR	Simion AUR	Șoșoacă S.O.S.	Orban FD	Cioloș REPER	Kövesi Ind.	Hellvig Ind.	Others
INSCOP	20–27 Nov 2023	1,100	26.2	12.1	20.8	4.2	—	2.4	14.0	14.4	—	3.9	—	—	1.9
INSCOP	23 Oct–2 Nov 2023	1,100	27.7	—	21.8 (Note: With PNL endorsement)	—	12.1	3.1	18.9	10.5	—	4.3	—	—	—
AtlasIntel	20–29 Oct 2023	2,000	20.4	0.7	10.3	6.9	2.3	3.0	7.7	13.3	3.4	2.4	10.9	6.4	13.4
INSCOP	15–22 Sep 2023	1,550	25.3	11.2	19.5	5.6	—	2.7	18.7	10.1	—	4.1	—	—	3.4
AtlasIntel	27–30 Jan 2023	2,000	22.6	4.9	—	8.0	—	4.4	10.6	6.1	3.8	2.0	16.4	0.4	20.9 (Note: Don't know 11.1, invalid/blank vote 9.8)
AtlasIntel	27–30 Jan 2023	2,000	14.6	4.6	6.2	4.5	—	2.9	9.7	5.5	5.1	5.1	16.9	0.5	24.2 (Note: Don't know 13.1, invalid/blank vote 11.1)
Election	Nov 2019	—N/a	—N/a	37.82	22.26	15.02		3.87	—	—	—	—	—	—	—

=== Opinion polls without Geoană (2023) ===
Poll	Date	Sample	Ciucă PNL	Ciolacu PSD	Drulă USR	Kelemen UDMR	Simion AUR	Șoșoacă S.O.S.	Cioloș REPER	Orban FD	Kövesi Ind.	Hellvig Ind.	Others
INSCOP	20–27 Nov 2023	1,100	14.1	27.4	7.1	2.7	18.0	19.1	6.7	—	—	—	4.9
AtlasIntel	27–30 Jan 2023	2,000	8.0	13.3	7.4	2.1	10.4	5.9	5.3	5.0	15.7	2.9	24.1 (Note: Don't know 13.0, invalid/blank vote 11.1)
Election	Nov 2019	—N/a	37.82	22.26	15.02	3.87	—	—	—	—	—	—	—

=== Opinion polls with potential candidates (before 2023) ===
Poll	Date	Sample	Cîțu^{PNL}	Orban^{PNL}	Ciolacu^{PSD}	Barna^{USR PLUS}	Cioloș^{USR PLUS}	Drulă^{USR PLUS}	Diaconescu^{PMP}	Kelemen^{UDMR}	Simion^{AUR}	Șoșoacă^{NR/S.O.S.}	Dragnea ApP	Geoană^{Ind.}	Others
Gazeta Civică	15–31 Jul 2021	1,112	11.0	—	4.0	—	—	22.0	—	5.0	—	—	—	33.0	6.0
INSOMAR	1–8 May 2021	1,030	—	12.03	16.1	22.00	13.4	—	8.3	—	14.2	4.0	6.6	—	3.37
INSOMAR	8–11 Feb 2021	1,030	3.0	11.4	23.0	21.0	12.6	—	—	3.0	17.0	—	0.0	—	8.96
Election	Nov 2019	—N/a	37.82		22.26	15.02			5.72	3.87	—N/a	—N/a	—N/a	—N/a	14.97

=== The first round among Romanian citizens from the Republic of Moldova ===
Poll	Date	Sample	Geoană Ind.	Ciolacu PSD	Ciucă PNL	Șoșoacă S.O.S.	Simion AUR	Drulă USR	Cioloș REPER	Kelemen UDMR	Piedone PUSL	Others/ N/A
iDATA	22 – 26 Apr 2024	1,006	15.0	3.1	3.4	4.8	2.4	0.7	5.5	1.0	6.1	58.0
iDATA	22 – 26 Apr 2024	1,006	34.6	7.1	7.8	5.5	11.1	1.6	12.7	2.3	14.1	—
CBS-Research	6 – 13 Apr 2024	1,008	14.1	4.7	2.4	4.1	1.0	0.9	—	—	—	72.8
CBS-Research	6 – 13 Apr 2024	1,008	51.9	17.3	15.0	14.0	3.7	3.3	—	—	—	—

== Hypothetical second round ==
=== Geoană vs Ciolacu ===
Poll	Date	Sample	Geoană Ind.	Ciolacu PSD
INSCOP	19 - 27 June 2024	1,100	63.7	36.3
INSCOP	14 Feb–5 Mar 2024	2,000	61.0	39.0
AtlasIntel	20–29 Oct 2023	2,000	64.9	35.1

=== Geoană vs Simion ===
Poll	Date	Sample	Geoană Ind.	Simion AUR
INSCOP	14 Feb–5 Mar 2024	2,000	75.0	25.0
AtlasIntel	20–29 Oct 2023	2,000	71.8	28.2
INSCOP	15–22 Sep 2023	1,550	63.5	36.5
AtlasIntel	27–30 Jan 2023	2,000	69.5	30.5

=== Geoană vs Ciucă ===
Poll	Date	Sample	Geoană Ind.	Ciucă PNL
INSCOP	19–27 June 2024	1,100	63.9	36.1
AtlasIntel	27–30 Jan 2023	2,000	76.2	23.8

=== Geoană vs Kövesi ===
Poll	Date	Sample	Geoană Ind.	Kövesi Ind.
INSCOP	14 Feb–5 Mar 2024	2,000	66.0	34.0
AtlasIntel	20–29 Oct 2023	2,000	61.2	38.8
AtlasIntel	27–30 Jan 2023	2,000	53.1	46.9

=== Geoană vs Lasconi ===
Poll	Date	Sample	Geoană Ind.	Lasconi USR
INSCOP	19 - 27 June 2024	1,200	66.2	33.8

=== Ciolacu vs Simion ===
Poll	Date	Sample	Ciolacu PSD	Simion AUR
AtlasIntel	20–29 Oct 2023	2,000	69.5	30.5
INSCOP	15–22 Sep 2023	1,550	58.8	41.2
AtlasIntel	27–30 Jan 2023	2,000	54.1	45.9

=== Ciolacu vs Lasconi ===
Poll	Date	Sample	Ciolacu PSD	Lasconi USR
INSCOP	19–27 June 2024	2,000	58.0	42.0

=== Ciolacu vs Drulă ===
Poll	Date	Sample	Ciolacu PSD	Drulă USR
AtlasIntel	20–29 Oct 2023	2,000	50.4	49.6

=== Ciolacu vs Ciucă ===
Poll	Date	Sample	Ciolacu PSD	Ciucă PNL
INSCOP	14 Feb–5 Mar 2024	2,000	63.0	37.0
AtlasIntel	27–30 Jan 2023	2,000	51.7	48.3

=== Ciolacu vs Kövesi ===
Poll	Date	Sample	Kövesi Ind.	Ciolacu PSD
AtlasIntel	20–29 Oct 2023	2,000	58.6	41.4
AtlasIntel	27–30 Jan 2023	2,000	57.8	42.2

== Trust in politicians ==
Poll	Date	Sample	Geoană Ind.	Ciolacu PSD	Simion AUR	Ciucă PNL	Șoșoacă S.O.S.	Lasconi USR	Kelemen UDMR	Cioloș REPER	Kövesi Ind.	Others
INSCOP Research	19–27 June 2024	1,100	33.4	23.6	18.0	21.4	20.2	21.3	8.5	—	—	—
