= Romanian Social Party =

Political party in Romania

Romanian Social Party Partidul Social Românesc
- Abbreviation: PSRO
- Leader: Mircea Geoană
- Founded: 9 March 2015
- Dissolved: 2018
- Split from: Social Democratic Party
- Succeeded by: Romania in Action Party
- Ideology: Social democracy
- Political position: Centre-left
- Regional affiliation: Coalition for Baia Mare (2016)

Website
- http://www.psro.ro/

The Romanian Social Party (Romanian: Partidul Social Românesc, PSRO) was a centre-left political party in Romania. It was founded in March 2015 by a number of former Social Democratic (PSD) MPs led by Mircea Geoană who was expelled from the PSD earlier that year. Geoană and his supporters claimed that the PSD under Victor Ponta "deviated from its left-wing identity" and supported a motion of no confidence launched by the opposition against the Ponta government (i.e. the fourth Ponta cabinet) in June 2015.

In Spring 2018, the party was officially dissolved.
