= Mircea Geoană =

Romanian politician and diplomat (born 1958)

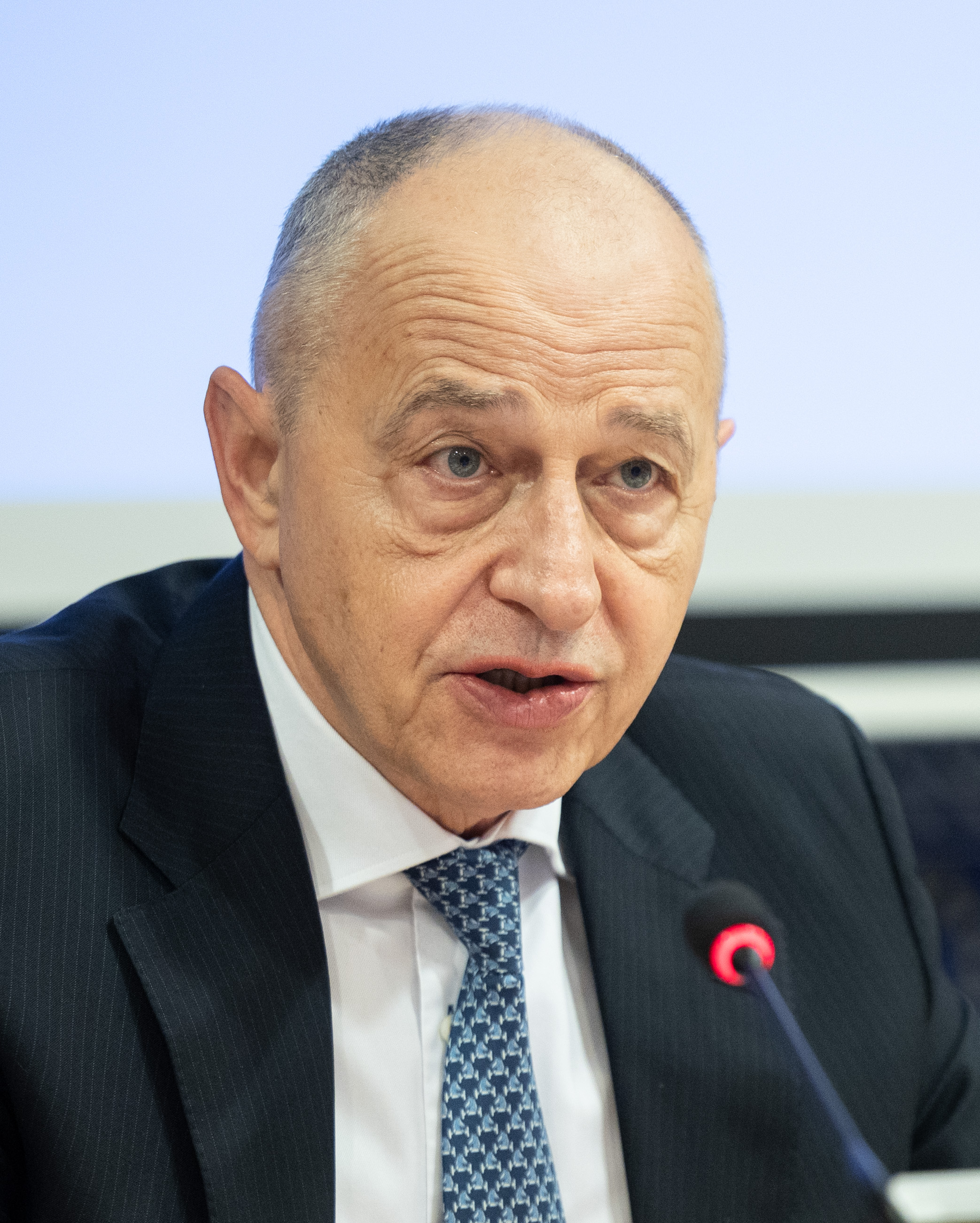
- Geoană in 2024

Deputy Secretary General of NATO
- In office 17 July 2019 – 3 September 2024
- Secretary General: Jens Stoltenberg
- Preceded by: Rose Gottemoeller
- Succeeded by: Radmila Šekerinska

Senator of Romania
- In office 13 December 2004 – 19 December 2016

President of the Senate of Romania
- In office 19 December 2008 – 23 November 2011
- Preceded by: Ilie Sârbu
- Succeeded by: Petru Filip (acting)

President of the Social Democratic Party
- In office 2005–2010
- Preceded by: Adrian Năstase
- Succeeded by: Victor Ponta

Co-president of the Alliance PSD+PC
- In office 2008–2010 Serving with Dan Voiculescu

Minister of Foreign Affairs
- In office 28 December 2000 – 28 December 2004
- Prime Minister: Adrian Năstase; Eugen Bejinariu
- Preceded by: Petre Roman
- Succeeded by: Mihai Răzvan Ungureanu

Ambassador of Romania to the United States
- In office 6 February 1996 – 27 December 2000
- Preceded by: Mihai Botez
- Succeeded by: Sorin Dumitru Ducaru

Personal details
- Born: Dan Mircea Geoană; 14 July 1958 (age 68) Bucharest, Socialist Republic of Romania
- Party: Independent (2011–2012; 2014–2015, 2018–present)
- Other political affiliations: Romanian Social Party (2015–2018); Social Democratic Party (2001–2011; 2012–2014); Party of Social Democracy in Romania (2000–2001)
- Spouse: Mihaela Geoană (m. 1985)
- Children: 2
- Education: Polytechnic University of Bucharest; École nationale d'administration University of Bucharest; Harvard University; Bucharest Academy of Economic Studies

Dan Mircea Geoană (Note: Romanian pronunciation: [ˈdan ˈmirt͡ʃe̯a d͡ʒe̯oˈanə]) (born 14 July 1958) is a Romanian politician and diplomat who served as the deputy secretary general of NATO between 2019 and 2024. He previously served as president of the Senate of Romania from December 2008 until he was revoked in November 2011. From April 2005 until February 2010, he was the head of the Social Democratic Party (PSD, Romanian: Partidul Social Democrat).

Geoană was the candidate of the party for the position of President of Romania in the 2009 presidential election which he narrowly lost to Traian Băsescu. He was dismissed from PSD on 22 November 2011 but rejoined the party in late 2012. From 2015 to 2018, he was the founder and leader of the Romanian Social Party. Additionally, he was also the president of Aspen Institute Romania, which is an apolitical and non-profit organisation.

On 17 July 2019, he was appointed deputy secretary general of NATO, replacing Rose Gottemoeller and assisted Jens Stoltenberg as No. 2 and Chairman of NATO's Innovation Committee, during a mandate marked in particular by the Russian invasion of Ukraine in 2022.

He resigned 3 September 2024 to run for President of Romania in the election later that year, where he finished in sixth place.

== Early life and career ==
Geoană was born in Bucharest, on 14 July 1958. His father, Ioan Geoană, was a general in the Romanian Army from 1965 to 1992 and was head of the Civil Defense Command. He was among the defendants of the investigation into the Romanian Revolution of 1989. His mother, Elena Iuliana Geoană, was an engineer at ITB. Mircea Geoană grew up in the Cișmigiu and Domenii neighborhoods of Bucharest.

=== Education ===
He graduated from Saint Sava High School in Bucharest in 1977, where he followed the real profile. Then he attended the Faculty of Mechanics at the Bucharest Polytechnic Institute, as well as the Faculty of Law at the University of Bucharest. He attended the École nationale d'administration in Paris in 1992, as well as the course on Democratic Institutions of NATO.

Geoană obtained his PhD in world economy from the Academy of Economic Studies in Bucharest on 18 July 2005. According to an analysis by investigative journalist Emilia Șercan, Geoană's 279-page thesis contains significant plagiarism, with 21 graphs and ten tables copied from other sources without proper attribution, and 72 pages with text content plagiarised from United States (US) presidential reports from 1999, 2002, and 2003. According to Șercan, there are 36 citations in the thesis, but 81 works listed in the bibliography. Geoană responded to the analysis, stating, "there were things we mentioned ... I don't know, I'm telling you that what I did with my doctoral thesis was done absolutely honestly and I don't feel anything outside the rules of that time. Now ... if the rules have changed in the meantime, that's something else." According to the ASE Ethics Committee, Mircea Geoana plagiarised only 43 lines and two tables, a decision that Emilia Sercan criticised.

During the period in which he was Romania's ambassador to Washington, he attended the World Bank Group's Managerial Development Program, within the Harvard Business School.

=== Family and personal life ===
Mircea Geoană is married to Mihaela Geoană, an architect by profession, with whom he has a daughter (Ana Maria) and a son (Alexandru). Mihaela Geoană's brother, Ionuț Costea, was the president of Eximbank.

=== Interests ===
Mihaela Geoană was President of the "National Red Cross Society of Romania" since April 2007, of the "Renaissance for Education, Health and Culture" Foundation, as well as of the "Millenium for Human Rights" NGO.

Mircea Geoană occupied, for two or three years, a place among the domestic football referees at Bragadiru and Voluntari. "I took it from below, from the Honor Division" – he said in an interview. "Only I know how much swearing I heard, but also how much physical conditioning I did. You cannot imagine how much passion there can be at an Honor Division match, at Bragadiru or Voluntari. I did it with passion." He is a supporter of the football team Rapid București.

== Activity in civil society ==
Geoană is the President of the Aspen Institute Romania, "an apolitical organization that aims to promote dialogue between the political, intellectual and business leaders." Geoană serves on the advisory council of the Krach Institute for Tech Diplomacy at Purdue University, which is dedicated to accelerating the innovation and adoption of trusted technology to advances freedom. He is also Honorary President of the George Marshall Romania Association.

== Diplomatic activity ==
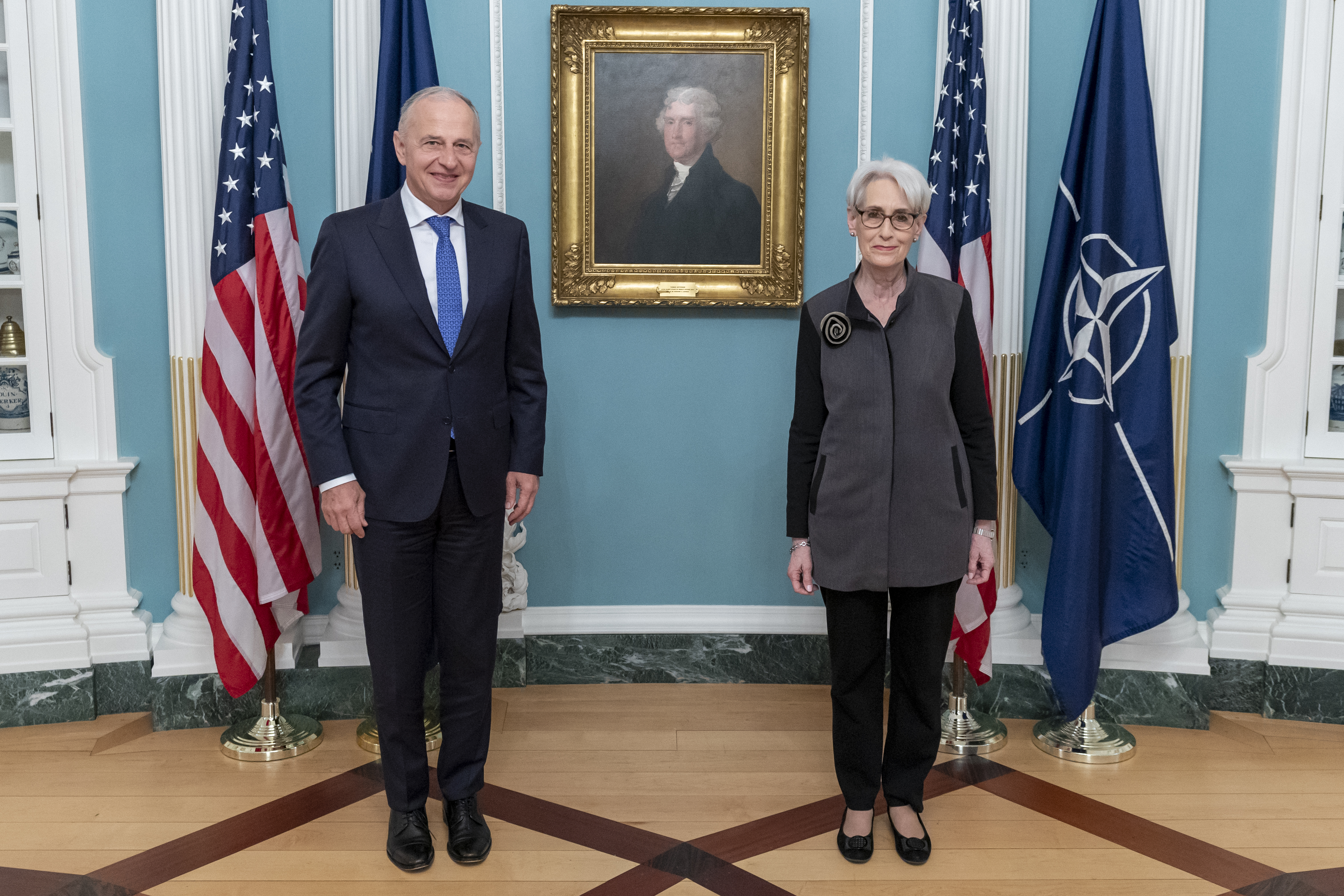
Mircea Geoană meeting with US Deputy Secretary of State Wendy Sherman on May 10, 2022

A speaker of the French language, in 1990 he was hired by the Foreign Ministry as responsible for relations with France. The following year, Minister Adrian Năstase promoted him to head the European Affairs Directorate for relations with NATO, the European Union, the OSCE, the WEU, and the Council of Europe. In this capacity in 1991 he led the Romanian delegation to the committee of senior officials of the OSCE. In 1994 he became director general of the directorate general for Asia, Latin America, the Middle East, and Africa and in 1995 also for Europe and North America. Between 1993 and 1995 he was simultaneously the spokesman of the Foreign Ministry then led by Teodor Meleșcanu.

In 2019, Mircea Geoană was appointed Deputy Secretary General of NATO, after the position was opened to a person from Eastern Europe. During his term, he is chairman of NATO's Innovation Committee and under his leadership, NATO approves its digital transformation strategy. At the Brussels Forum panel discussion in 2024 celebrating 75 years of NATO, Geoană says "Now nations investing in new generation, defence and deterrence, investing in our partnerships, investing in innovation, investing in cyber, investing in space, investing in countering disinformation and this and fake news, I would say is nothing short of remarkable."

In 2024, Geoană was quoted as saying about the United States' foreign policy, "As much Europe needs America, America, I think needs all its allies. The strategic reality is that China is a formidable challenger and that Russia and China and all the others together will create massive attempts to disrupt American power. There is an intense aggressive interest from these countries to basically challenge the world order which was introduced after the end of the Second World War. In this epic struggle America will need not only its own strength, but also all the allies in the Alliance."

== Political career ==
=== Ambassador ===
In February 1996 he was appointed to transfer to Washington, D.C., becoming the youngest ambassador in Romania's diplomatic corps at 37. A career diplomat, from 1996 to 2000 Geoană served as Romania's ambassador to the United States.

According to former PNȚCD leader Ion Diaconescu, in 1996, Geoană was close to his party, calling Diaconescu after the 1996 general elections and telling him that "we won against them" (i. e. - the Party of Social Democracy in Romania), with Geoană becoming close to the Social Democrats in the 2000s, after PNȚCD lost its popularity.

=== Foreign minister ===
From 28 December 2000 to 28 December 2004, Geoană was the foreign minister of Romania, as part of the PSD government of Adrian Năstase. After the Romanian legislative elections of 2004, he was replaced by Mihai Răzvan Ungureanu from the Justice and Truth Alliance (DA).

As foreign minister on 11 January 2001, on the occasion of the permanent council of the Organization for Security and Co-operation in Europe, he assumed the rotating presidency of the OSCE for one year. Among the objectives of his mandate he listed the resolution of the ongoing conflicts in the former Yugoslavia, Moldova, and Chechnya. In 2005 he was then personal representative of the OSCE chairman-in-office for Georgia.

The Năstase government considered membership of NATO and the European Union a priority, succeeding in both cases. Relations with the United States were marked by various official visits and by the constant support of American diplomacy for Romania. The government and parliament guaranteed their support to the United States in President George W. Bush's War on terror, and in November 2002 the admission of Romania to NATO was approved with effect from March 2004.

In terms of negotiations with the European Union, despite the misgivings of the allies about the reform of the economy and the successes in the fight against corruption, the meeting of the heads of state and government of the EU 16–17 December 2004 ratified the admission of Romania, scheduling the signing of the treaty for 2005 and the accession alongside Bulgaria for 2007.

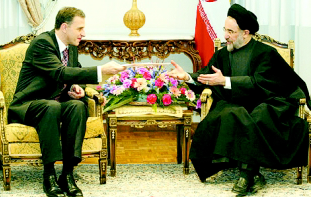
Mircea Geoană with the President of the Islamic Republic of Iran, Mohammad Khatami, in 2003

Thanks to the improvement of illegal emigration control policies, on 7 December 2001 the Justice and Home Affairs Council of the EU decided to abolish the visa system for Romanian citizens traveling in the Schengen Area starting from 1 January 2002.

The foreign policy of 2001–2004 was also distinguished by the normalization of relations with Russia. During the Romanian presidency of the OSCE, Geoană elaborated various projects for the Caucasus area without encountering obstruction by Russia. Negotiations for a treaty between the two countries began in October 2001 and concluded with the signing of the agreement in Moscow on 4 July 2003. Under the terms of the treaty, both states could join any political alliance or military they wanted. The topic of historical problems was not included in the provisions of the pact, but in a statement by the foreign ministers Geoană and Igor Ivanov.

From 1 July 2004 Geoană held the position of president of the United Nations Security Council for a month and in this capacity he was the first Western politician to visit Iraq after the transfer of sovereignty from the US army to the newborn Iraqi government. In 2001, Geoană was the chairman of the Organization for Security and Co-operation in Europe.

=== 2004 local election ===
While he was in office as foreign minister, the PSD presented him as its representative for the nomination as mayor of Bucharest in the local elections of 6 June 2004

In 2004, during the local elections in Romania, he ran for Mayor of Bucharest, but lost to incumbent mayor Traian Băsescu of the Democratic Party (PD), right in the first round. Five months later the party proposed Năstase for the presidency of Romania and Geoană as possible prime minister of a new PSD government resulting from the 2004 parliamentary elections. Năstase's defeat by Băsescu in the presidential elections, however, opened the door for a government led by the center-right coalition Justice and Truth Alliance, despite Geoană having already entered into negotiations for the birth of a coalition executive between the PSD and other minor forces.

Because of his statements between the first round and the presidential ballot, in which he maintained that the party was on the verge of achieving a government alliance with the Democratic Alliance of Hungarians in Romania, in March 2005 the former head of state Ion Iliescu publicly called him "fool" (in Romanian "prostănac "). According to these, in fact, the rumors of a possible coalition with the UDMR would have had weight at the electoral level and contributed to the defeat of Năstase.

At the parliamentarians he was elected senator in the constituency of Dolj County. He was for the entire legislature president of the foreign policy commission of the senate and member of the joint one with the chamber of deputies for European affairs.

=== President of the Social Democratic Party ===
Considered a young reformer, Geoană was elected president of the party on 25 April 2005 by delegates at a PSD Party Congress held in Bucharest. His victory represented a surprise defeat for the former president and founder of the PSD Ion Iliescu, who was expected to defeat Geoană easily. Geoană's win was attributed by the media to last minute backroom dealing by party leaders opposed to Iliescu as well as to public gaffes made by Iliescu at the Party Congress, including using the term comrades ("tovarăși") when referring to his fellow party colleagues.

At the PSD Congress on 10 December 2006, Geoană was re-elected as party President, with his platform, "Social Romania", defeating Sorin Oprescu's.

=== Senate presidency ===
On 22 November 2011, after refusing to step down as the President of the Senate of Romania following the request of the PSD leadership, he was ousted as member of the party, losing the confidence of his colleagues in the Executive National Council of PSD where his dismissal was voted 50 to 5 while 3 abstained. In the following days he will have to step down as President of the Upper House of the Romanian Parliament as he no longer has the support of a party group in the Senate. The following day he was revoked by the senators in the plenary meeting with 112 votes for, 2 against, and 5 abstentions. He remains an independent senator. He was readmitted into the party ranks in Autumn 2012, after a reconciliation with the PSD leadership.

=== First expulsion from the Social Democratic Party ===
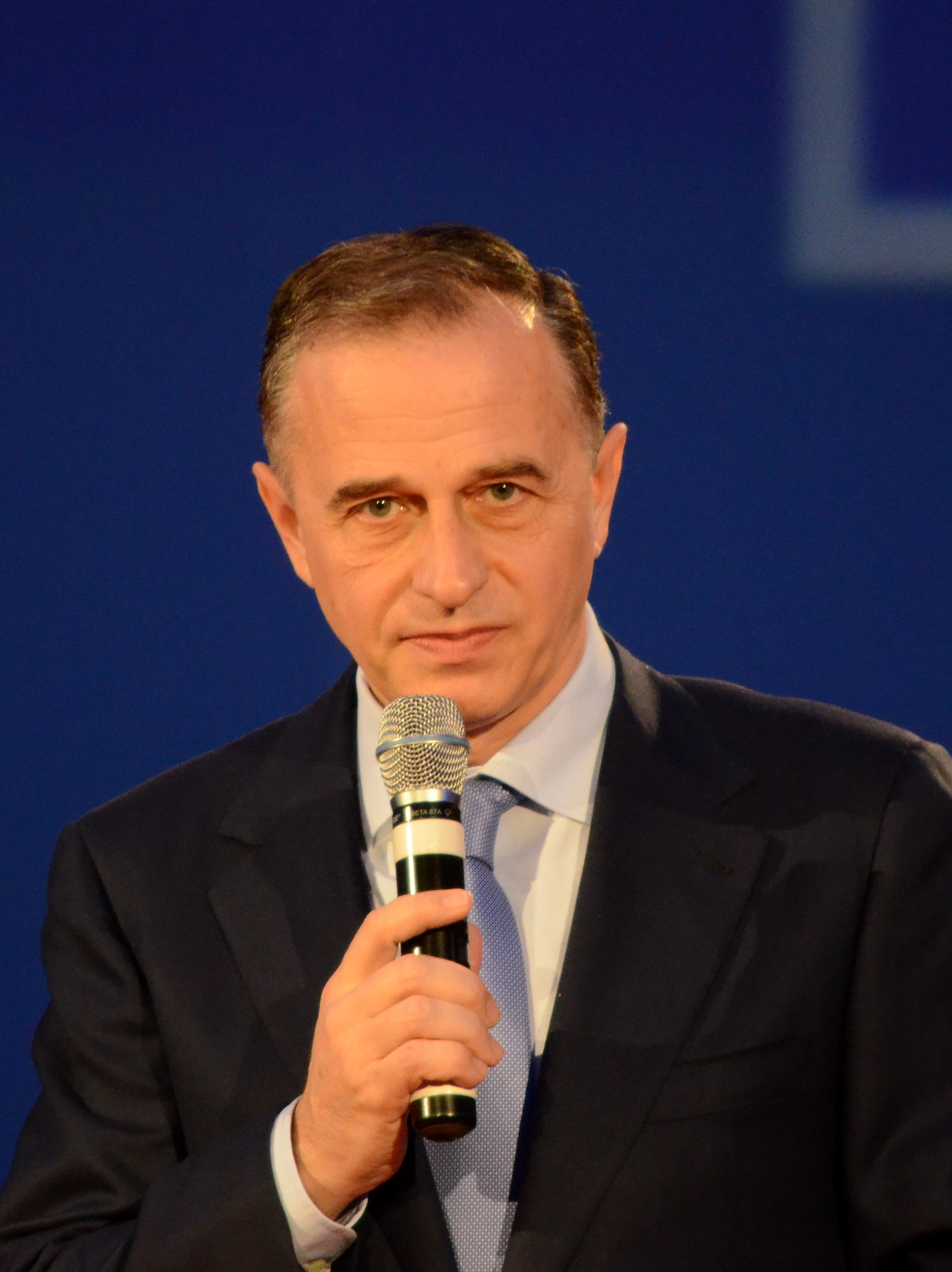
Mircea Geoană at the launch of the România noastră association in March 2012

Weakened by the defeat in the presidential elections, Geoană tried to run again as leader of the PSD at the congress of 20 February 2010, but was defeated by Victor Ponta, who was elected new leader of the party with 856 votes to 781.

Critical of the new leadership, on 14 December 2010, the party's executive office suspended him for six months due to various statements considered harmful to the unity of the PSD. In the autumn of 2011 he issued polemic statements against Iliescu and other members of the leadership, also announcing that he wanted to run again for the presidency of Romania. Geoană also made a public visit to the United States where he met with several local authorities, without informing the party leaders. This led to new frictions with Ponta.

On 31 October 2011, therefore, the PSD parliamentary group demanded the dismissal of Geoană from the presidency of the Senate. On 7 November, the PSD senators expressed themselves with 25 votes in favor and 5 abstentions, while Geoană refused to resign. On 14 November, with 43 votes in favor and 5 against, the party's integrity commission proposed his expulsion from the PSD for violations of the statute. The decision was validated by the executive committee of 22 November (50 in favour, 5 against, and 3 abstentions). The next day the Senate voted for his revocation of the post of president of the upper house, with 112 in favour, 2 against, and 5 abstentions.

Marginalized by the PSD, on 16 March 2012 he presented an association called România noastră, while on the following 3 April some of his supporters founded its political branch, the Prodemo party. In May 2012 he assumed the chairmanship of the Senate Foreign Policy Committee.

=== Second expulsion from the Social Democratic Party ===
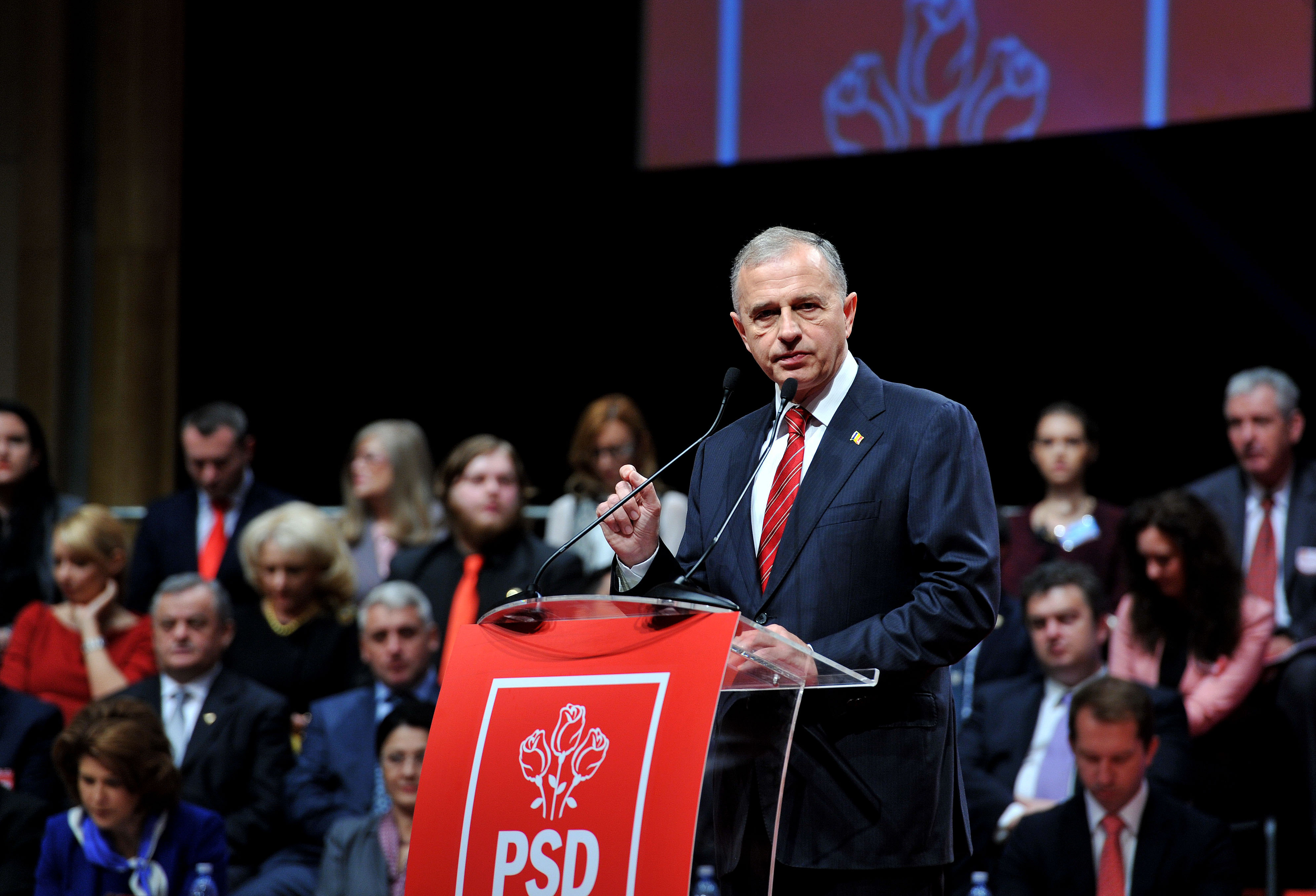
Mircea Geoană at the National Council of the Social Democratic Party in 2013

After the summer of 2012 he managed to re-establish relations with the PSD, which included him in the electoral lists of the Social-Liberal Union, a coalition set up together with the PNL in an anti-Băsescu function. At the parliamentarians of 9 December 2012 he obtained his third term as senator, obtaining the election in the district of Dăbuleni–Segarcea with 46,833 votes, equal to 70.75% of the preferences. During the legislature he was a member of the commission for European affairs (from December 2012 to October 2013), of that for Romanians abroad (from February 2014 to December 2016) and president of the joint commission with the chamber of deputies for the accession of Romania to the Schengen area (from June 2013 to December 2014).

Following new tensions that arose within the PSD, resulting from the defeat of Victor Ponta in the 2014 presidential elections, the executive committee decided on 27 November 2014 to definitively remove him from the party alongside Dan Șova and Marian Vanghelie, who had criticized the leadership. As a result of the expulsion from the party, he also lost the function of high representative of the prime minister for the promotion of strategic economic projects, which he held since 12 February 2014. For this reason he was also forced to vacate the apartment owned by the state assets to which he was entitled thanks to this position.

Accusing Ponta of deviation from the centre-left identity of the PSD, in March 2015 he founded the Romanian Social Party, which in June 2015 supported a motion of no confidence against the Ponta IV government. The PSRO did not go beyond 1.2% in the 2016 local elections and in 2017 it dissolved.

== Presidential campaigns ==
=== 2009 presidential election ===
On 3 December 2009, candidates in the second round, Băsescu and Geoană met in a televised debate that marked the final confrontation of the campaign. The event was held at the Palace of the Parliament. The debate started with a presentation of arguments that Băsescu and Geoană tried in turn to explain why Romanians should vote for them. The candidate of the PSD+PC Alliance said he came up with a project to develop the country and has demonstrated that he can unite the Romanians and keep "a constructive tone and a positive approach." He discussed the three pillars that he sustains: redefining the way that Romania is working, agriculture, and developing the working field. Geoană specified that his alliance with the liberals, initialed in Timișoara, is sincere and not based on political interests. He expressed hope that Băsescu will not use in the debate means and personal attacks, "like the way in which he designed the campaign, which was based on lies and personal attacks on the family."

In turn, Băsescu said that the presidency is a privilege and a "huge obligation" which marked him every day in the five-year term when he was president of Romania. His speech was focused on supporting the accelerated reform of the state in which the "voice of Romanians must be heard". The head of state proposed "a government of politicians for politicians". Băsescu spoke about the Social Democrats (PSD), whom he accused that they do not understand the country's priorities, and are instead interested in acquiring political privileges. The candidate supported by the Liberal Democrats (PDL) recalled the possibility of the return to power of former communist government officials and Iliescu should Geoană win the presidential election. Additionally, Băsescu promised that it would immediately pass Romanians outcome of the referendum of 22 November to reduce the number of MPs and creating a unicameral parliament, which he never did. The two candidates' approaches were often strewn during the three hours of debate with personal attacks and mutual accusations. The President stated that the support structure of Geoană's campaign was linked to television stations owned by Sorin Ovidiu Vântu and Dan Voiculescu, and supported by Dinu Patriciu's public interventions. The two presidential candidates swore with the hand on a Bible provided by Robert Turcescu, the moderator of the debate. While Geoană vowed he had not promised any benefits to Patriciu, Vântu, and Voiculescu, Băsescu vowed that he "never punched a child in the plexus or in the face".

A flashpoint of the 2009 presidential election was the revelation that Geoană, then President of the Senate and vice-president of the Supreme Council of National Defence, made a private visit to Moscow on 27 April 2009, where he met with Dmitry Medvedev, then President of the Russian Federation. The visit was confirmed by Cristian Diaconescu, the Romanian Minister of Foreign Affairs at the time of the visit and by his campaign team although initially dening knowledge of such a meeting taking place. Geoană's opponents, including Traian Băsecu and Crin Antonescu, criticized Geoană for this visit and the manner in which it was organized. The visit became an important topic during the presidential election because it raised questions about Geoană's stance on Russia at that time. Concerns were also brought up about Geoană's possible ties to Boris Golovin, a Russian businessman with interests in the Romanian energy sector who presents himself as a former Soviet GRU/Spetsnaz officer, and the person who allegedly organized the visit.

=== 2024 presidential election ===
On 3 September 2024, Geoană resigned as deputy secretary-general of NATO to again seek the presidency of Romania. Geoană's independent candidacy in the 2024 presidential election is backed by the România Renaște (Romania Renaissance) non-governmental organization (NGO). Previously, in 2023, various opinion polls for the presidential election have placed Geoană in the first place.

Throughout his 2024 presidential campaign, there have been numerous allegations against Geoană. Notably, during a debate hosted by Antena 3 CNN on 29 October 2024, Geoană has been accused by Elena Lasconi, the USR candidate for the Romanian presidency, of meeting with Tal Hanan, known for manipulating elections in over 30 countries worldwide, allegations that have been denied by Geoană. Concerns have also been brought up by the PSD candidate and Prime Minister Marcel Ciolacu about potential troll farm servers on the floor of a building in Bucharest that help Geoană in the election. In response, Geoană asked Ciolacu to disclose "the political source of [the] information, the address of the so-called troll farms, [...] and whether this was done on the basis of explicit instructions from the Prime Minister or Marcel Ciolacu, the candidate for the Presidency of Romania".

== Electoral history ==
=== Mayor of Bucharest ===
Election	Affiliation	First round			Second round		
Election	Affiliation	Votes	Percentage	Position	Votes	Percentage	Position
2004	PSD	225,774	29.74%	2nd	–		

=== Presidential elections ===
Election	Affiliation	First round			Second round		
Election	Affiliation	Votes	Percentage	Position	Votes	Percentage	Position
2009	PSD+PC	3,027,838	31.15%	2nd	5,205,760	49.66%	2nd
2024	Independent	583,898	6.32%	6th	—N/a	—N/a	—N/a

Political offices
Preceded by Petre Roman	Minister of Foreign Affairs; 2000–2004	Succeeded by Mihai Răzvan Ungureanu
Preceded by Ilie Sârbu	President of the Romanian Senate; 2008–2011	Succeeded by Petru Filip; Acting
Party political offices
Preceded by Adrian Năstase	President of the Social Democratic Party; 2005–2010	Succeeded by Victor Ponta
Diplomatic posts
Preceded by Rose Gottemoeller	Deputy Secretary General of NATO; 2019–present	Incumbent
