= Balta Doamnei =

- Commune
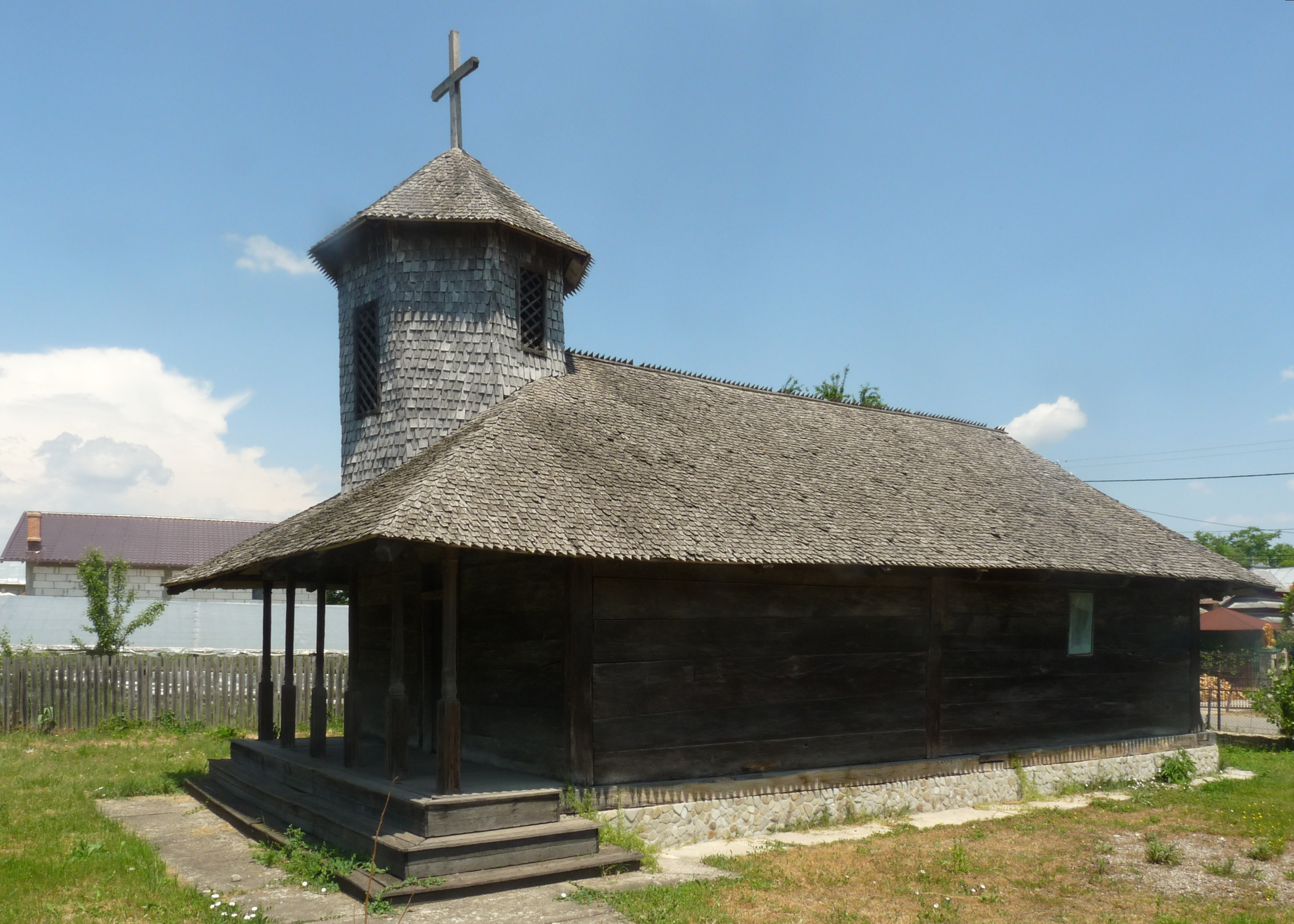
- Three Hierarchs Church

- Coat of arms

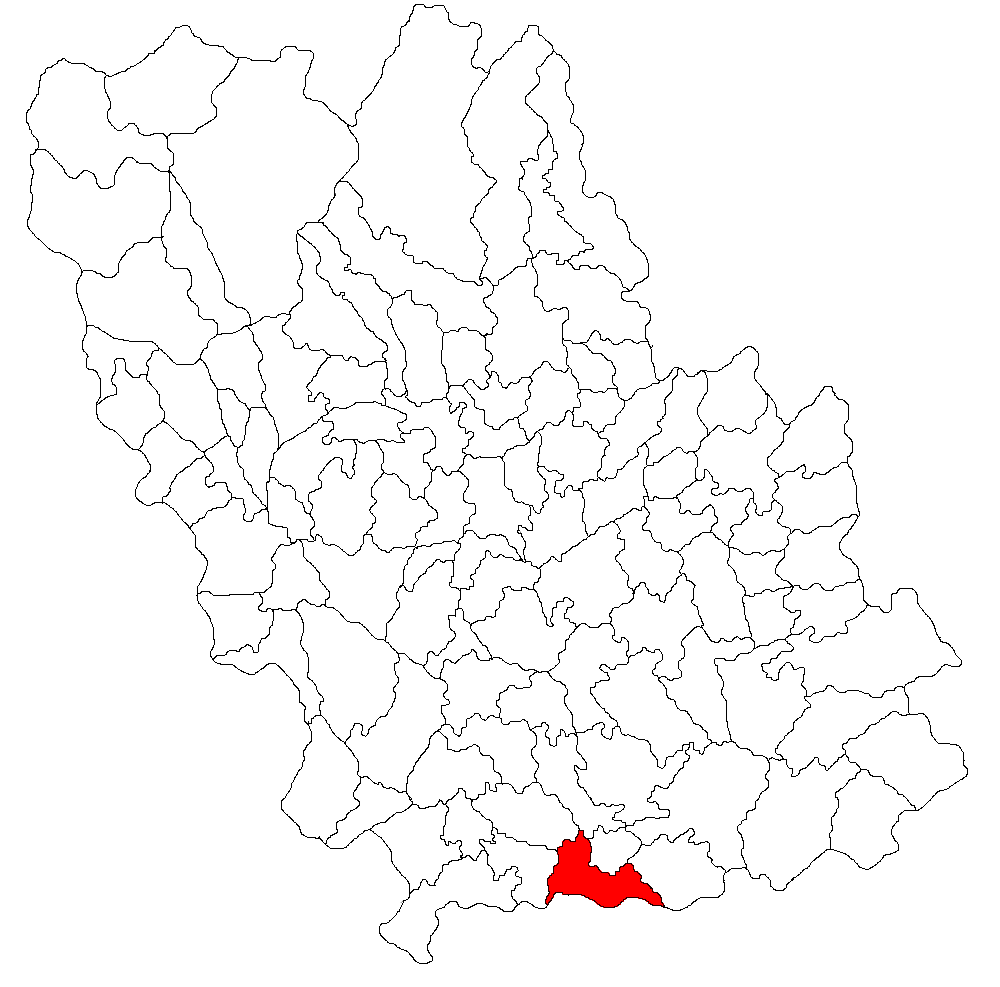
- Location in Prahova County

- Location in Romania
- Coordinates: 44°45′N 26°10′E
- Country: Romania
- County: Prahova

Government
  - Mayor (2024–2028): Alexandru Vasile (Ind.)
- Area: 33.7 km^{2} (13.0 sq mi)
- Elevation: 94 m (308 ft)
- Population (2021-12-01): 2,374
  - Density: 70.4/km^{2} (182/sq mi)
- Time zone: UTC+02:00 (EET)
  - Summer (DST): UTC+03:00 (EEST)
- Postal code: 107040
- Area code: +(40) 244
- Vehicle reg.: PH
- Website: comunabaltadoamnei.ro

Balta Doamnei is a commune in Prahova County, Muntenia, Romania. It is composed of four villages: Balta Doamnei, Bâra, Curcubeu, and Lacu Turcului.

The commune lies in the Wallachian Plain, on the left bank of the Ialomița River. It is located in the southern part of Prahova County, on the border with Ilfov County. The county seat, Ploiești, is It is 27 km (17 mi) to the north, while the capital of Romania, Bucharest, is 45 km (28 mi) to the south.

Historical population
Year	Pop.	±%
1992	2,802	—
2002	2,768	−1.2%
2011	2,652	−4.2%
2021	2,374	−10.5%
Source: Census data

== Natives ==
- Stelian Popescu (1874–1954), journalist
