= Bubuieci =

- Commune
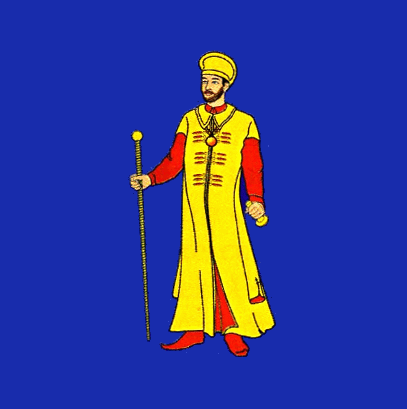
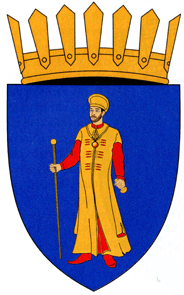
- Flag Coat of arms

- Location in Moldova
- Coordinates: 46°59′N 28°57′E
- Country: Moldova
- Municipality: Chișinău

Government
  - Mayor: Alexei Percemlî (PAS)

Population (2024)
  - Total: 11,152
- Time zone: UTC+2 (EET)
  - Summer (DST): UTC+3 (EEST)
- Postal code: MD-2081
- Area code: +373 22
- Website: Official website

Bubuieci (Romanian pronunciation: [buˈbu.jet͡ʃʲ]) is a commune and village in the Chișinău municipality, Moldova, located just south‑east of the capital. The commune is composed of three villages: Bîc, Bubuieci, and Humulești.

The village of Bubuieci marks its foundation date as 22 April 1518, when the ruler of Moldavia, Bogdan III the One-Eyed, granted a deserted area near the Bîc River to Pârcălab (burgrave) Toader Bubuiog. The village’s name is a later adaptation of its founder’s surname.

== Demographics ==
According to the 2024 census, 11,152 inhabitants lived in the commune of Bubuieci, an increase compared to the previous census in 2014, when 8,047 inhabitants were registered.

Ethnic composition of Bubuieci (2024)
1. Moldovans (Note: There is an ongoing controversy regarding the ethnic identification of Moldovans and Romanians.) (83.5%)
2. Romanians (12.8%)
3. Russians (1.50%)
4. Ukrainians (1.00%)
5. Others (1.20%)
Linguistic composition of Bubuieci (2024)
1. Romanian (49.2%)
2. Moldovan (Note: In March 2023, the Parliament of Moldova passed a law updating all legislative texts and the constitution to refer to the national language as Romanian, effectively rendering the term "Moldovan" obsolete.) (43.8%)
3. Russian (5.60%)
4. Other (1.40%)

Historical population
Year	Pop.	±%
2004	6,748	—
2014	9,966	+47.7%
2024	11,152	+11.9%

== Notable people ==
- Teodor Cojocaru, Bessarabian and Romanian politician and military officer, member of Sfatul Țării, Mayor of Chișinău (1919-1920)
