= Ludovic Mrazek =

Romanian geologist

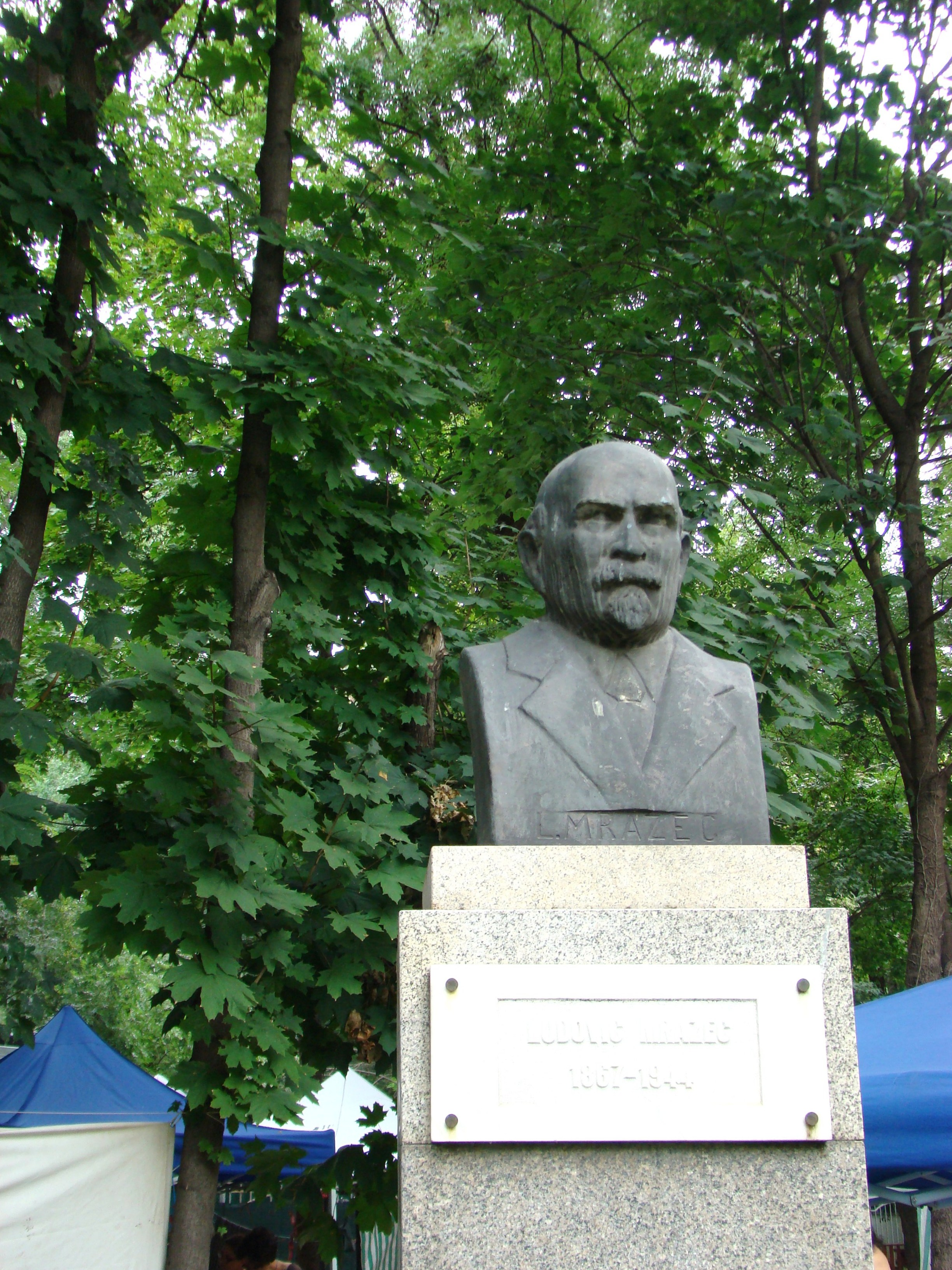
Bust of Mrazec in Bucharest

Ludovic Mrazec (July 17, 1867 in Craiova – June 9, 1944 in Bucharest) was a Romanian geologist and member of the Romanian Academy. He introduced the term diapir that denotes a type of intrusion in which a more mobile and ductilely deformable material is forced into brittle overlying rocks. The phenomenon of "diapirism" allows rock salt to provide an effective trap for hydrocarbon deposits. In this way, Ludovic Mrazec explained the distribution of hydrocarbon accumulations in the Neogene Carpathian. Diapirism is commonly used as a basic concept in geological survey as well as in Planetary science.
