= Constantin Dimitriu-Dovlecel =

Romanian lawyer and politician

Constantin D. Dimitriu-Dovlecel (December 9, 1872 – October 27, 1945) was a Romanian lawyer and politician.

Born in Târgoviște, he was the son of a wealthy property owner and tradesman from the town. He graduated from two faculties of the University of Bucharest: law (1894) and literature and philosophy (1895). Dimitriu then returned to Târgoviște, where he practiced law. A member of the National Liberal Party (PNL), he was first elected to the Assembly of Deputies in 1901. In 1907, he became prefect of Dâmbovița County. From 1914 to 1916, he was general secretary at the Religious Affairs and Education Ministry. During the interwar period, Dimitriu formed part of two PNL cabinets. He was Communications Minister from June 1927 to November 1928 under Barbu Știrbey, Ion I. C. and Vintilă Brătianu; and Minister of Labor, Health and Social Protection from November 1933 to February 1934, under Ion G. Duca and Gheorghe Tătărescu. Concurrently, he was vice president of the national institute of administrative sciences and contributed to the magazines Convorbiri Literare and Viața. First elected to the Senate in 1927, he served as Senate President from November 1935 to November 1936.
