= List of Romanian diplomats =

This is a list of Romanian diplomats. Most of these people made at least a significant portion of their career in the Romanian or foreign diplomatic services.

== A ==
- Vasile Alecsandri
- Constantin Antoniade
- Constantin Argetoianu
- Mihail Arion
- Radu Scarlat Arion

== B ==
- Victor Bădulescu
- Nineta Barbulescu
- Anton Bibescu
- Grigore Bilciurescu
- Lucian Blaga
- Mihail Boerescu
- Raoul Bossy
- Caius Brediceanu

== C ==
- Nicolae Calimachi-Catargiu
- Victor Cădere
- Alejandro Ciorănescu
- Edmond Ciuntu
- Grigore Constantinescu
- Noti Constantinide
- Brutus Coste
- Aron Cotruş
- Alexandru Cretzianu
- George Cretzianu
- Radu Crutzescu
- Grigore Cugler
- Radu Cutzarida

== D ==
- Carol Citta Davila
- Aurel Decei
- Gheorghe Derussi
- Neagu Djuvara
- Dimitrie Drăghicescu
- Gheorghe Duca

== E ==
- Theodor Emandi

== F ==
- Eugen Filotti
- Richard Franasovici

== G ==
- Grigore Gafencu
- Constantin Virgil Gheorghiu
- Dimitrie Ghika
- Ion Ghica
- Matila Ghyka
- Constantin Grecianu
- Vasile Grigorcea
- Alexandru Gurănescu

== H ==
- Dinu Hiott
- Andrei Corbea Hoişie

== I ==
- Alexandru Iacovaki

== K ==
- Constantin Karadja

== L ==
- Alexandru Emanuel Lahovary
- Filip Lanovari
- Ion Lahovary
- Nicolae Lahovary
- Constantin Langa-Răşcanu
- George Lecca

== M ==
- Mircea Maliţa
- Corneliu Mănescu
- Simona Miculescu
- Nicolae Milescu
- Nicolae Mişu

== N ==
- Frederic Nanu

== P ==
- Alexandru Paleologu
- Ion Pangal
- Vespasian Pella
- Nicolae Petrescu-Comnen
- Dumitru Prunariu

== R ==
- Mihail Ralea
- Savel Rădulescu
- Victor Rădulescu-Pogoneanu
- Mirela Roznoveanu

== S ==
- Teodor Solacolu
- Petre Stoica
- Vasile Stoica

== T ==
- Alexandru Teriachiu
- Viorel Virgil Tilea
- Nicolae Țimiraș
- Nicolae Titulescu
- Alexandru Totescu

== V ==
- Ion Aurel Vassiliu
- Nicolae Velo
- Tudor Vianu
- Constantin Vișoianu

== Z ==
- Alexandru Zamfirescu
- Duiliu Zamfirescu
