= Eugen Filotti =

Romanian diplomat and journalist (1896–1975)

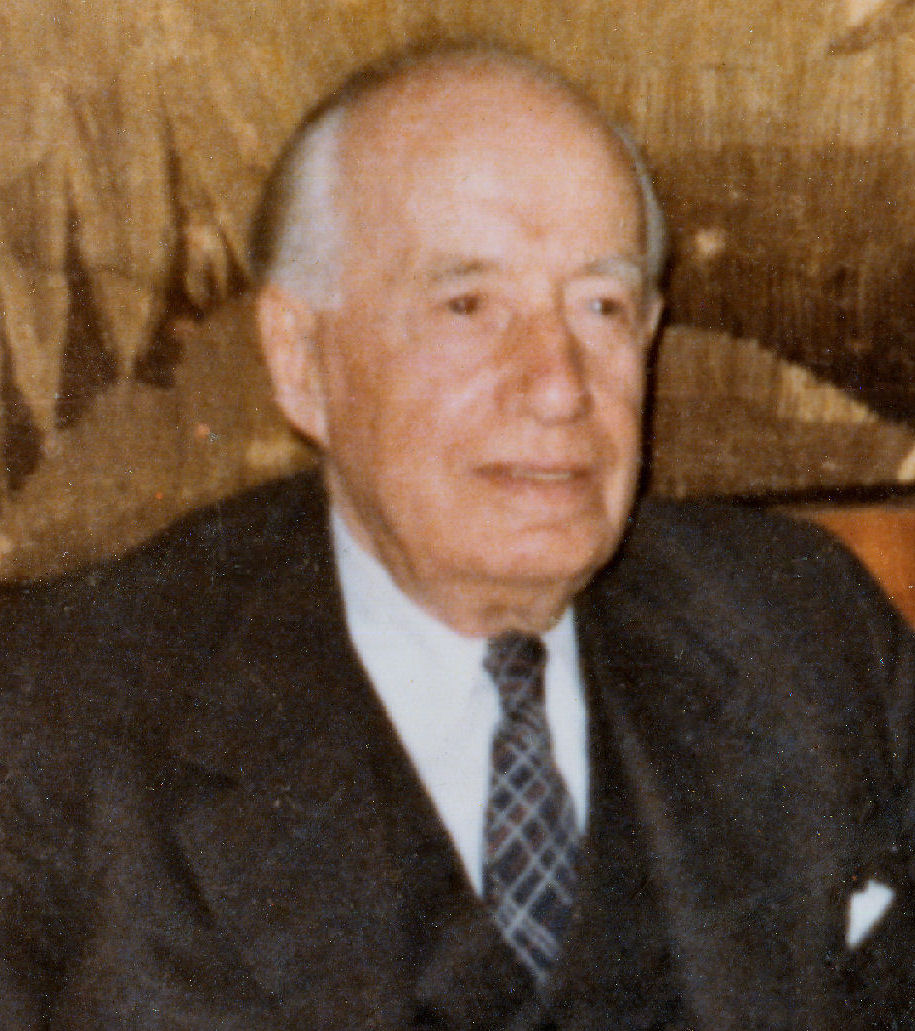
- Eugen Filotti in 1973

Press Attache of the Romanian Legation in Prague
- In office 1927–1930
- Succeeded by: Lucian Blaga

Director of the Press, Romanian Ministry of Foreign Affairs
- In office 1930–1935

Envoy Extraordinary and Minister Plenipotentiary of Romania in Turkey
- In office 1935–1936

Envoy Extraordinary and Minister Plenipotentiary of Romania to Greece
- In office 1936–1938
- Preceded by: Constantin Langa-Rășcanu

Envoy Extraordinary and Minister Plenipotentiary of Romania to Bulgaria
- In office 1938–1940
- Preceded by: Vasile Stoica

Envoy Extraordinary and Minister Plenipotentiary of Romania to Hungary
- In office 1940–1944

Secretary General of the Romanian Ministry of Foreign Affairs
- In office 1944–1945

Personal details
- Born: July 28, 1896 Bucharest, Kingdom of Romania
- Died: June 1, 1975 (aged 78) Bucharest, Socialist Republic of Romania
- Resting place: Bellu Cemetery, Bucharest, Romania
- Spouse: Elisabeta Tasca
- Relations: parents: Nicolae Filotti; Aurelia Filotti (née Felix)
- Children: Andrei Filotti (b. 1930); Domnica Ghimuș (b. 1932); Ion Filotti (b. 1941); Alexandra Filotti (b. 1947)
- Education: University of Bucharest
- Profession: Journalist, diplomat, writer
- Awards: Legion of Honour

Eugen Filotti (July 28 (July 17 O.S.) 1896 – June 1, 1975) was a Romanian diplomat, journalist and writer. As a diplomat he worked at the League of Nations in Geneva and then as minister plenipotentiary in Turkey, Greece, Bulgaria, and Hungary. As minister plenipotentiary to Budapest he issued transit visas for Jews during the Holocaust. He was secretary general of the Ministry of Foreign Affairs in 1944–1945. As a writer he published several translations of literary works.

== Youth ==
Eugen Filotti was born in Bucharest, Romania. His father, Nicolae Filotti was a military pharmacist, having the rank of lieutenant and his mother, Aurelia Filotti (née Felix) was the daughter of doctor Iacob Felix. He was the second child of the family, having a brother Mircea Filotti, his elder by four years. Nicolae Filotti died of tuberculosis when Eugen Filotti was only 2 years old and his mother had to struggle to raise her two sons with the small resources provided by her husband's pension.

In 1902–1906 Eugen Filotti attended the Cuibul cu barză school, on Știrbei Vodă Street, in Bucharest and thereafter, from 1906 to 1914 Gheorghe Lazăr High School in Bucharest. In 1913, while still in high school, he started working for various newspapers, writing articles about foreign news.

In 1914 he started studying pharmacy at the Bucharest University of Medicine, attending courses for two years. When Romania entered World War I in 1916, he was forced to interrupt his studies, being conscripted as lieutenant and assigned as pharmacist to the army medical staff of the front line. After the retreat of the Romanian troops to Moldavia, he was transferred to the medical units of the Trotuș Valley front. After the war, he gave up his pharmacy studies and attended the Law School of the University of Bucharest, obtaining his degree in 1922. While in university, he continued his journalistic activities, writing articles for several newspapers and magazines.

== Activity as journalist ==
After graduating from Law School, Filotti joined the editorial staff of the Adevărul newspaper, concentrating on foreign relations and writing editorials concerning international events. Besides, from 1924 to 1926 he also published, as director, the second series of the Cuvântul Liber. Writers such as Ion Barbu, Victor Eftimiu, Camil Petrescu, and Tudor Arghezi or musicians, such as George Enescu were among the main contributors. Eugen's brother, film producer and screenwriter Mircea Filotti was in charge of the film chronicle. The magazine was political and cultural weekly, advocating the integration of Romania into post-war Europe and opposing the populist ideas promoted by the Viața Românească. In his introductory article, used the term of Europeanism, however in a different meaning than this concept had after 1945. The magazine also strongly supported the avant-garde in art and literature, which were viewed as a participation of Romanian artist and writers to the cultural unrest of the 1920s.

The magazine was a focal point of a group of young writers, journalists, artists and other intellectuals, who were carried away by the euphoria following World War I, and, after Romania had fulfilled its national aspirations, were attempting to define the ways of perfecting their new homeland. This group strongly opposed the leftist radicals, who were looking with interest at the soviet experiment, and was looking towards the west. However, they thought that new Romania, considered to be a big and strong country, had to play an important role a renewed Europe, which was also trying to find its own new stability. The link to Western Europe was conceived mainly as an integration of the Romanian cultural and artistic movements into the European ones.

Such ideas were disseminated not only by Cuvântul Liber, but also by other magazines, such as Contimporanul, Punct, Mișcarea Literară and, later, by Unu. However, besides publishing their ideas, the group of young enthusiasts to which Filotti belonged, attempted to organize important cultural events which would help them promote their ideas. The most representative of these event, both due to its importance and to its international attendance was the "First exhibition of modern art" in Bucharest.

The exhibition was organized in the building of the "Romanian Fine Arts Union" on Strada Corabiei Nr. 6, from November 30 to December 30, 1924. The main Romanian artists participating were M.H. Maxy, Marcel Iancu, Victor Brauner, Constantin Brâncuși, Milița Petrașcu, and Mattis Teutsch. Important artists from other European countries presented some of their works, among which Teresa Żarnowerówna, Mieczysław Szczuka (Poland), Lajos Kassák (Hungary), Marc Darimont, Marcel Lempereur-Haut, Jozef Peeters (Belgium), Karel Teige (Czechoslovakia), Kurt Schwitters, Hans Arp, Arthur Segal, Paul Klee, Hans Richter, Erich Buchholz, Ernst Rudolf Vogenauer (Germany) and Viking Eggeling (Suedia).

The exhibition opened on a Sunday, at noon, in a pitch-dark room:

"There were just two candles burning on a table covered by a black canvas. Suddenly, Eugen Filotti made his appearance next to the table, relaxed and inspired, reciting a text presenting to the public both the new form of art and the exposed paintings"

Tudor Vianu at that time a young professor of aesthetics, who also attended the opening, recalls in his memoirs:

"The dark room, swarming with visitors, where Eugen Filotti was finishing his introductory speech, suddenly vibrated at the loud roll of drums. The lights went on, focusing on a jazz orchestra located behind the speaker. The orchestra, which also included a black musician started playing, and the visitors started roaming around at the sound of string instruments, trombones and drums."

In his memoirs, Sașa Pană quotes parts of Eugen Filotti's speech, which emphasized the internal cohesion and the unity of modern art and called for an intensification of this art through spiritual and intellectual activities. Eugen Filotti predicted that this type of art would be understood only when the contemporary civilization would learn to look at painting in absolute purity. His speech quoted works of Wassily Kandinsky, Maurice de Vlaminck, Pablo Picasso and Paul Klee, as well as those of Constantin Brâncuși and other Romanian artists.

In his own articles on the exhibition, Eugen Filotti presented the event in a positive light, and highlighted the value of the work exposed by Romanian artists, stressing that they were in no way inferior to the foreign participants. He noted "Constructivism dominates on each wall al the exhibition hall, however without completely obliterating expressionist visions, cubist decomposures or coloristic experiments."

The exhibition also turned into a clash between "modernists" and "traditionalists". The group who had organized the exhibition, including Eugen Filotti supported a modernist, rationalist, democratic trend and wanted to promote a spiritual interaction with the rest of the world. On the opposite side, the adherents of different traditionalist movements, which had also emerged after World War I, did not refrain to exacerbate nationalistic and mystical expressions in art and culture. While the nationalistic movements had not evolved into the extremism of the 1930s, and the antagonism was still kept at an intellectual level, modernists perceived them already as a potential danger. The issue was not to oppose the presence of religion in culture, but to fight against the attempts of transforming it into an instrument of nationalism and antidemocracy. While antisemitism was not yet an issue, as many of the artists and writers supporting the modernist trends were Jewish, this could have contributed to the opposition of the traditionalists. These attitudes outlined the future movements in Romanian politics and culture, and the modernists were already laying the basis of their resistance against totalitarianism, regardless whether it came from the political right or left.

Tudor Vianu expressed the view that "if the program of ethnic culturalism was adopted, Romanian culture would regress to an undignified provincial level". Expanding the same idea, Eugen Filotti wrote: "traditionalism means nothing else than the megalomania of distress" A short time later, he continued in the same vein:

Under the banner of orthodoxy and tradition some intellectuals promote a static ideal, petrified in the hieratic byzantine-muscovite forms of a primitive culture, having no evolution whatsoever and nu future. Our ideal is a dynamic culture, having the desire of growth, renewal and fecundity. The scope of our generation's endeavours should not be clinging to a sterile and, in some respects, imaginary tradition, nor cultivating exclusively the autochthonous character... The type of culture we want to promote is European. Our light comes from the West.

The salvation lies in the Westernization of this country... If we are talking about national assertion, we see this as being active and productive: the expression of our cultural and spiritual character in specific European forms... As far as we are concerned, there is no antagonism and no incompatibility between europeanism și "romanianism". We have only the sacrilegious wish to harmonise romanianism with the heartbeat of contemporary life... We want this life to be liberated from balcanism, from asiatism, from archaism and from the rustic simplicity which limits existence to the path from the village church to the village tavern...

We have a better opinion about our own people than all the traditionalists and that is why want Romania to start making its entrance into Europe. Many nations, located between the Atlantic and our borders, have succeeded in being European without losing the specificity of their ethnic spirit. Why would we be the only ones who need a senseless and useless isolation?

Eugen Filotti continued his journalistic activity until 1927. However, as time went by, he became increasingly disillusioned by the cultural life in Romania. The integration of Romanian culture into a more comprehensive European culture, which many of the young intellectuals of his generation had been attempting to promote, did not occur. Instead, currents of various nationalistic tendencies had proliferated and were increasingly active in opposing European integration. Some writers and artist had left for various western countries and many more were seriously considering this alternative. Gradually detaching himself from the Romanian internal cultural life, Eugen Filotti increasingly oriented his journalistic activity towards foreign policy, which had been his main concern in the early years of his career. At the Adevărul newspaper, he was given the responsibility of writing the editorials on foreign affairs and of coordinating the related activities.

== Diplomatic activity ==
=== Press attaché ===
In 1927, Eugen Filotti decided to give up journalism and to pursue a diplomatic career. After being appointed press attaché in Prague where he worked for over a year, in 1928 Eugen Filotti was transferred to the Romanian Mission to the League of Nations in Geneva. From 1928 to 1930 he works, next to other diplomats, among which Savel Rădulescu, as aid to Nicolae Titulescu, permanent representative of Romania to the League of Nations.

In 1929 Eugen Filotti married Elisabeta Tașcă, daughter of professor Gheorghe Tașcă, at that time rector of the Academy for High Commercial and Industrial Studies in Bucharest.

=== Director of the Press ===
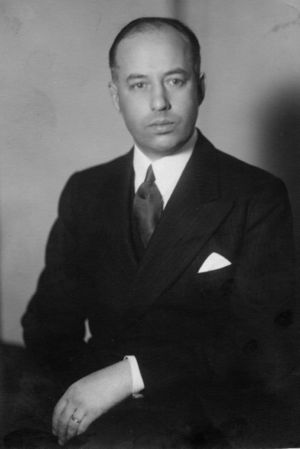
Eugen Filotti as Director of the Press – 1935

In 1930, Eugen Filotti is promoted Director of the Press and of Information in the Ministry of Foreign Affairs. In the early 1930s Romania's foreign policy, under the leadership of Nicolae Titulescu, was pursuing a system of alliances, which would enable the smaller countries of the Balkan region to oppose any aggression. At that time, the National Socialist Party had not gained power in Germany, but, in Titulescu's political vision, such alliances had to be created in advance, so as to have time to consolidate. Titulescu hoped to create a union of all Balkanic countries. As, due to its territorial claims, Bulgaria did not adhere to such a proposal, there was still the possibility of developing an alliance of the other Balkan states: Romania, Yugoslavia, Greece and Turkey. Romania was the diplomatic force pressing for an alliance. In his capacity of Director of the Press and Information, Eugen Filotti was in charge of informing the mass media and to develop a favorable public opinion in all concerned countries. Finally, after several years of negotiations and various bilateral agreements, the Balkan Pact was signed on February 9, 1934, in the great aula of the Academy of Athens by Demetrios Maximos for Greece, Nicolae Titulescu for Romania, Tevfik Rüștü Aras for Turkey and Bogoljub Jevtić for Yugoslavia.

În his capacity of director of the press, Eugen Filotti had the responsibility of verifying the activity of foreign press correspondents working in Romania. Besides many journalists, adhering to high professional standards, there were some less honest persons who tried to squeeze in. The case of Julius Köver exemplifies the problems raised by incorrect reporting. Köver claimed to be an economic correspondent of the Austrian daily Neue Freie Presse, presenting the required credentials. In 1933 he also registered at the Direction of the Press in Bucharest as correspondent of the American United Press International. Köver also contributed to the newspapers Pester Lloyd and Budapesti Hírlap published in Hungary and the German language newspapers Prager Tagblatt and Die Wirtschaft published in Czechoslovakia. Julius Köver's activities started raising suspicions in February 1935, when United Press released the information that Prince Nicholas of Romania was expected to return to Romania, where the Iron Guard was preparing a revolt intending to depose King Carol II and to replace him with Nicholas. Another false news sent by Julius Köver to America claimed that Nicolae Titulescu, the minister of Foreign Affairs, had signed an agreement in Moscow, which granted the Soviet army the right of transit through Romania. Such information had not only the result of casting a negative image of the country but of also weakening Romania's position within the Balkan Pact. Called by Eugen Filotti to the Direction of the Press for explanations, Julius Köver claimed that the news releases of the United Press Agency had been generated in Vienna and that he had nothing to do with them. Actually Köver had designed an ingenious system to transmit his fallacies to various branch offices of the agency, from where they were retransmitted to the United States. He hoped that this stratagem would help him hide his identity from the Romanian authorities and, at the same time, would enable him claim that he used it to elude the censorship existing in Romania. Eugen Filotti was able to point these malversations and, at last, Julius Köver was expelled from Romania.

Apart from his activities in the Ministry of Foreign Affairs, after returning from his missions in Prague and in Geneva, Eugen Filotti renewed his contacts with the Romanian cultural elite. This time his activity was mainly related to the Romanian chapter of the International PEN locally called the "PEN Club". On April 8, 1933, a new committee of the Romanian PEN Club was elected, including Victor Eftimiu (chairman), Ion Sân-Giorgiu (general secretary), Eugen Filotti (treasurer), Ion Marin Sadoveanu, Lucian Blaga as well as a member of the Cluj subsidiary. At that time, the cultural life in Romania was extremely agitated. The new committee was forced to confront the international tensions related to the Internaţional PEN Congress, planned in Dubrovnik on May 23, 1933. Adolf Hitler had been appointed Chancellor of Germany and the independence of the German PEN, who was also represented at the congress, was put in doubt by other member organizations. Germany was attempting to ensure international recognition of the legitimacy of the new regime, and was trying to obtain resolutions in its favor in various international organizations. Eugen Filotti's diplomatic experience was an important element in defining the position of the Romanian delegation at the Dubrovnik congress. He was able to convince Victor Eftimiu to pass a resolution of the committee, expressing its reservations towards Germany.

In the following year, there were other conflicts which surfaced in the Romanian PEN, reflecting the political turmoil in Romania. On February 11, 1934, at the Extraordinary General Assembly of the Romanian PEN, Alexandru Busuioceanu, who was also Eugen Filotti's deputy at the Direcţion of the Press and of Informations, brought to the attention of the attendants that "three members of the Romanian PEN, Nae Ionescu, Dragoș Protopopescu and Nichifor Crainic had been arrested, without a warrant because they had freely expressed their opinions" Busuioceanu, supported by Perpessicius, demanded that the leadership of the Romanian PEN intervene for their release. The three writers, known for their sympathies for the Iron Guard, had been arrested as part of the crackdown following the assassination of prime minister Ion G. Duca. Victor Eftimiu, as president of the PEN indicated that he had requested information regarding how the three members of the PEN Club were treated during their arrest, but was opposed to any other actions of support by the PEN. The differences of opinion between the democratic oriented members and the right wingers sharpened. When new elections for a committee were called in 1934, two lists of candidates were submitted to the General Assembly. The first, presented by Victor Eftimiu, which also included Eugen Filotti as a candidate was politically independent, while a second list, presented by Ion Petrovici, included as candidates Ion Pillat, Tudor Vianu, Perpessicius and Lucian Blaga was leaning towards the political right. Victor Eftimiu's list received 72% of the votes while the list proposed by Ion Petrovici had only 28%. After this decision Nichifor Crainic resigned from the Romanian PEN. However the tensions, reflecting the contradictions of Romanian society in the 1930s remained.

=== Minister plenipotentiary to Turkey ===
În 1935 Eugen Filotti was appointed plenipotentiary minister to Ankara. The position was important for the Nicolae Titulescu's foreign policy. The Balkan Pact had been signed just a year before and Titulescu was aware that the framework was still frail and that further steps were necessary in order to consolidate the alliance so that it could efficiently react in case of an attack on one of its members. Therefore, he tried to appoint diplomats who shared his views as ministers plenipotentiary in the signatory countries.

Titulescu's dismissal coincided with the departure of two key personalities from the Ministry of Foreign Affairs: Mihail Arion and Savel Rădulescu. The former, who held the position of secretary general of the ministry resigned, in circumstances that are not clear, his resignation being formally accepted on August 29, 1936. The latter, who had served as undersecretary of the ministry, was not included in the new team, replaced by Victor Bădulescu.

On August 28, 1936, King Carol II of Romania fired Niculae Titulescu and replaced him with Victor Antonescu. The decision was greeted with disbelief. Both the Romanian and foreign new commentators expressed the opinion that Titulescu would soon reenter the Romanian politics. The French newspapers were unaninomous. The Le Temps of August 31, 1936 indicated that "Mr. Titulescu is not the kind of man to accept such matters with resignation" while L'Intransigeant stated that the Titulescu's removal from the government din could only be temporary, opinion shared by the Journal des débats and Le Figaro. In the United Kingdom, on September 1, 1936, The Times wrote that, "in any case, there are no reasons to assume that Titulescu's disappearance from the political scene can be anything else than a passing eclipse. Men of this calibre and with his character do not leave the political arena for a long time". On September 2, 1936, The Daily Telegraph concurred that Titulescu would soon be active again in Romanian politics. The ministries of Foreign Affairs of France, the United Kingdom and Germany also expressed the same assumptions.

Many Romanian diplomats indicated their intention to resign in protest. Romanian and foreign press, reported the news and even newspapers which expressed doubts about the attitude of the diplomatic corps emphasized the intention of the government to purge high ranking diplomatic personnel especially the chiefs of mission known for their attachment to Titulescu. The government's intentions were not a secret in Bucharest. Armand Călinescu, a person who was politically well informed stated that "at the Ministry of Foreign Affairs there will be a significant reshuffle of the diplomatic corps". Despite the evidence, several representatives of the government denied such intentions and the diplomatic representatives abroad were urged to follow suit.

Despite denials, the new foreign minister, Victor Antonescu proceeded to a massive change in the staff of the Romanian foreign missions, recalling many of the plenipotentiary ministers. These changes, if not initiated, were at least approved by prime minister Gheorghe Tătărescu. Most of the heads of mission recalled were suspected of supporting the former minister of foreign affairs. The list of recalled ministers included: Nicolae Lahovary (Albania), Caius Brediceanu (Austria), Dimitrie I. Ghika (Belgium), Vasile Stoica (Bulgaria), Theodor Emandi (Czechoslovakia), Raoul Bossy (Finland), Constantin Langa-Rășcanu (Greece), Vasile Grigorcea (Hungary), Grigore Constantinescu (Iran), Ion Aurel Vassiliu (Japan), Constantin Antoniade (League of Nations), Dimitrie Drăghicescu (Mexico), Constantin Vișoianu (Poland), Mihail Boerescu (Switzerland), Eugen Filotti (Turkey) and Alexandru Gurănescu (Yugoslavia). In order to emphasize the punitive character of the measure, their diplomatic passports were withdrawn and all their diplomatic privileges withdrawn the moment the orders for their return to Romania were issued. The reshuffling of the staff coincided with the return to political or diplomatic activities of known opponents of Titulescu, such as Anton Bibescu and Victor Cădere. The magnitude of these changes indicated the intention of the new minister to replace most of the senior staff of the ministry. However, the implementation to the desired extent proved impossible to implement and part of the recalled ministers were appointed to other legations or received other positions at the headquarters of the Ministry.

=== Minister plenipotentiary to Greece ===
In the fall of 1936 Eugen Filotti was appointed minister plenipotenţiary to Athens. Although Greece was a signatory of the Balkan Pact, the now position was in not linked to the strengthening of the alliance, which Eugen Filotti had pursued before. After Titulescu's departure, the Romanian government was less interested in this alliance, whose role was seen just as a pact of friendship between the four signatories, without implying any consequent measures.

Romania had other problems in Greece related to the Aromanian minority (called Vlachs by the Greek). The Aromanians, which the government of Bucharest considered to be a Romanian population, were considered second class citizens in Greece and denied the right of having an education in their native language. However, taking into account the rapprochement policies of the two countries, the Greek government accepted the establishment of schools in which the education was to be in Romanian, on condition that such schools be financed by the Romanian government. The implementation of the agreement was not without difficulties.

Eugen Filotti made important efforts to strengthen the Romanian High School in Thessaloniki and to extend the network of Romanian primary schools which had been established in the villages of Epirus, Thessaly, West and Central Macedonia with high concentrations of Aromanian population. The best students of primary schools received scholarships to continue their education at the high school in Thessaloniki, which followed the curriculum established by the Ministry of National Education of Bucharest. Eugen Filotti also took care of the quality of education provided, ensuring that good material conditions would encourage well qualified teachers from Romania to compete for positions in the Romanian schools in Greece.

=== Minister plenipotentiary to Bulgaria ===
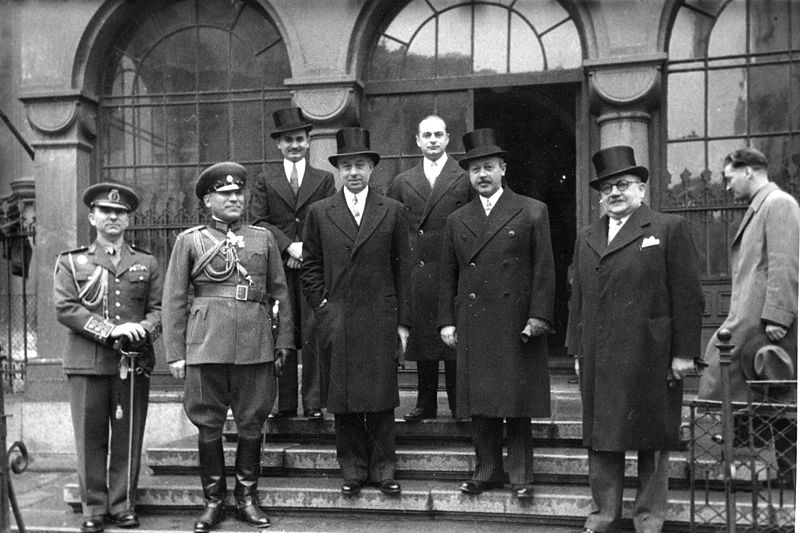
Eugen Filotti, minister plenipotentiary and the staff of the Romanian Legation in Sofia on the steps of the Romanian High School at the celebration of May 10, 1940

In the fall of 1938, Eugen Filotti was transferred from Athens to Sofia. The new assignment was different from his previous ones, as Bulgaria was not a friendly country. Defeated in the Second Balkan War, Bulgaria had been forced, by the Peace Treaty of Bucharest to cede Southern Dobruja (also known as the Cadrilater) to Romania, where the Romanian administration created the counties of Durostor and Caliacra. Romanian statistics of 1930, show that the Bulgarian population in the Cadrilater was of 149,409 while the Romanians were 77,728. The Romanian population had increased significantly compared to 1910, when the Romanians in the area were only 6,359. This is due to the policy of colonization of the 1920s, when Romanians from Wallachia as well as Aromanians from Greece and other Balkan countries had been settled in the Cadrilater. If Romania had an important Bulgarian minority, concentrated mainly in Dobruja, there also was an important Romanian minority in Bulgaria. Many Romanians were living along the Bulgarian bank of the Danube. Besides there were also Aromanians, living mostly in the Bulgarian part of Macedonia.

The problems of minorities were an important to the bilateral Romano-Bulgarian diplomatic relations and it was inevitable that, in his new position, Eugen Filotti would be confronted with issues related the rights of the Romanian minority in Bulgaria. As he had done in Athens, Eugen Filotti concentrated his efforts on strengthening the Romanian education network in Bulgaria, which included primary schools in the villages with Romanian population along the Danube as well as a Romanian high school in Sofia. All these schools were financially supported by the Romanian government and followed the curriculum if the Ministry of National Education in Bucharest. Although Bulgaria had territorial claims regarding not only the Cadrilater, but also the part of Macedonia which was located in Yugoslavia, the problem of rectifying the borders of Balkan countries was not yet on the agenda in 1938, when Eugen Filotti arrived in Sofia.

However, towards the end of 1939, the government in Sofia raised territorial claims and demanded that negotiations with Romania be started. The problem of Southern Dobruja differed from the one of other provinces which Romania had gained after World War II as it had not been decided in the Peace Treaties of Trianon, Saint-Germain-en-Laye sau Neuilly-sur-Seine. Therefore, such negotiations were not viewed as a revisionism of the peace treaties of 1919. Even in Romania, the issue of Southern Dobruja had been controversial. In 1913, King Carol I and many other politicians had disagreed with the territorial extension requested by Titu Maiorescu on a territory which did not have a Romanian population, arguing that this extension was contrary to the aspirations of creating a Romanian national state.

Unlike other situations regarding border disputes, for the Cadrilater problem no international conference was organized. It was mainly negotiated by a succession of diplomatic notes and discussions, in which a compromise acceptable to both parts was reached. As Romanian minister plenipotentiary to Sofia, Eugen Filotti was directly involved in these negotiations.

At the beginning, the positions of the two countries were totally contradictory. Romania wanted to change the ethnic status quo in the region and to preserve the territorial status-quo, while Bulgaria was aiming to achieve exactly the opposite.

The objectives of the negotiations was not only related to the transfer of sovereignty over the Cadrilater, but to establish a "final and perpetual" border between the two countries, which also involved an exchange of population. The Romanian diplomacy insisted on solving this problem at the same time. Romanian was facing similar problems in Transilvania, where the existence of an important Hungarian minority was claimed by Hungary to justify a revision of the borders fixed by the Treaty of Trianon. Romania was afraid that the existence of a Bulgarian minority in Northern Dobruja could be used by Bulgaria for further territorial concessions. Besides, as most of the Romanian population in the Cadrilater, had been colonized after its annexation, the Romanian government felt it had a moral obligation to defend the interests of these colonists.

At the beginning of the negotiations, the Romanian diplomats insisted on the mandatory emigration of all Bulgarians residing in Northern Dobruja (the counties of Constanța and Tulcea) while the Romanians of Southern Dobruja would have the freedom of choosing to emigrate to Romania or to stay. As this was rejected by Bulgaria, later in the negotiations the Romanians suggested that all Bulgarians residing in Romania be obliged to emigrate and a similar emigration would be mandatory for the Romanians of Southern Dobruja, but not for those residing in other parts of Bulgaria. Partially in order not to derail the negotiations and partially giving in to Germany's pressures, Bulgaria agreed to negotiate an exchange of population. The Bulgarians first suggested that emigration should not be a mandatory requirement. When the Romanians insisted on this issue, the Bulgarians rejected the proposal of the emigration of all Bulgarians residing in Romania versus the emigration of all Romanians residing in Southern Dobruja as not being equivalent. Therefore, the Bulgarians suggested a combination of mandatory and voluntary emigration. The final agreement, reached by the Treaty of Craiova stipulated:

- a mandatory population exchange between Bulgaria and Romania for the Bulgarian population of Northern Dobruja (counties of Constanța and Tulcea) and the Romanian population of Southern Dobruja (the counties of Durostor and Caliacra); this phase was to be completed within three months after the exchange of the ratification documents;
- an optional emigration of ethnic Bulgarians residing in other parts of Romania and of ethnic Romanians residing in other parts of Bulgaria, to be completed within one year after the exchange of the ratification documents;
- the right of each government to decree the mandatory emigration of the Romanian or Bulgarian nationals if the number of persons having opted for voluntary emigration was not equivalent.

Besides, various technical problems related to the population transfer had to be settled. After lengthy discussions the two parties involved agreed that the ownership of buildings located in rural areas which belonged to emigrants would be taken over by the state from which they emigrated. While an agreement on the mandatory emigration could be reached, a contradiction between the interest of the two parties prevented a consensus on the optional emigration. The Bulgarian government wanted to encourage all Bulgarians living in other parts of Romania, outside of Dobrogea, to be resettled in Bulgaria. The Romanian government preferred not to dismantle the compact Vlach communities of north-western Bulgaria and therefore did not agree on a mandatory parity of the population moved from one country to the other. Each of the two parties agreed to compensate the immigrants for the losses they incurred. However it was agreed that properties located in urban areas remained the property of the emigrants and also that the emigrants would maintain ownership of all mobile assets (including live-stock). The Treaty of Craiova created a joint Bulgaro-Romanian commission having the mission of overseeing the exchange of population and of settling individual claims or disputes.

The Romanian part also unsuccessfully attempted to maintain control over the Caliacra-Balcic area along the Black Sea coast, which the late Queen Mary of Romania had liked and where her heart was buried. Even as late as August 9, 1940, King Carol II of Romania was sending instructions to Filotti, urging him to insist on the matter. However the Bulgarians were intransigent on the matter, demanding the transfer of the entire Cadrilater. Therefore, after the signature of the treaty, Queen Mary's remains were reinhumed at Bran Castle.

Contrary to the assessment of some Bulgarian historians the Romanian position was not weakened by Germany but rather by the Soviet Union. After having occupied Bessarabia in June 1940, the USSR considered Bulgaria a more friendly country than Romania and considered that it would be in its interest to have a common border with Bulgaria. Therefore, the soviet diplomacy was encouraging the Bulgarians not to be satisfied with the Cadrilater, but to demand the transfer of its sovereignty over the entire Dobruja. Besides creating a common border between the Soviet Union and Bulgaria, this also presented the potential advantage for the Soviet Union of gaining control over the Danube Delta. As the Delta was not part of the Dobruja, it would not have been occupied by Bulgaria, but the possibility of Romania maintaining sovereignty over a territory to which it could have access only through a reach of the Danube bordered by unfriendly nations, was doubtful. During an audience, king Boris III of Bulgaria informed Eugen Filotti about the soviet intentions. This induced the Romanians to accelerate the negotiations and to reach an agreement before the Soviet Union would intervene in a more aggressive way.

On September 4, 1940, the Treaty of Craiova, finalizing over a year long negotiations. In accordance with the provisions of the treaty, the mandatory population exchange was completed in two phases. The main exchange took place in November–December 1940; during this phase 61,500 Bulgarians from Northern Dobruja and 83,928 Romanians from the Cadrilater moved. The second phase, which was implemented in accordance with an additional agreement, necessitated the move of another 3,600 Bulgarians and 4,700 Romanians from other parts of the two countries, outside the Dobruja. Thus, the total number of emigrants was of about 65,000 Bulgarians, who resettled in mostly in the Cadrilater and of about 88,000 Romanians who resettled in Northern Dobruja. However, Eugen Filotti was not concerned any more with these aftermaths of the Treaty of Craiova. After having concluded his lead role in the negotiations with Bulgaria, Eugen Filotti was recalled to Bucharest. He was assigned a new mission which was to be even more challenging.

=== Minister plenipotentiary to Hungary ===
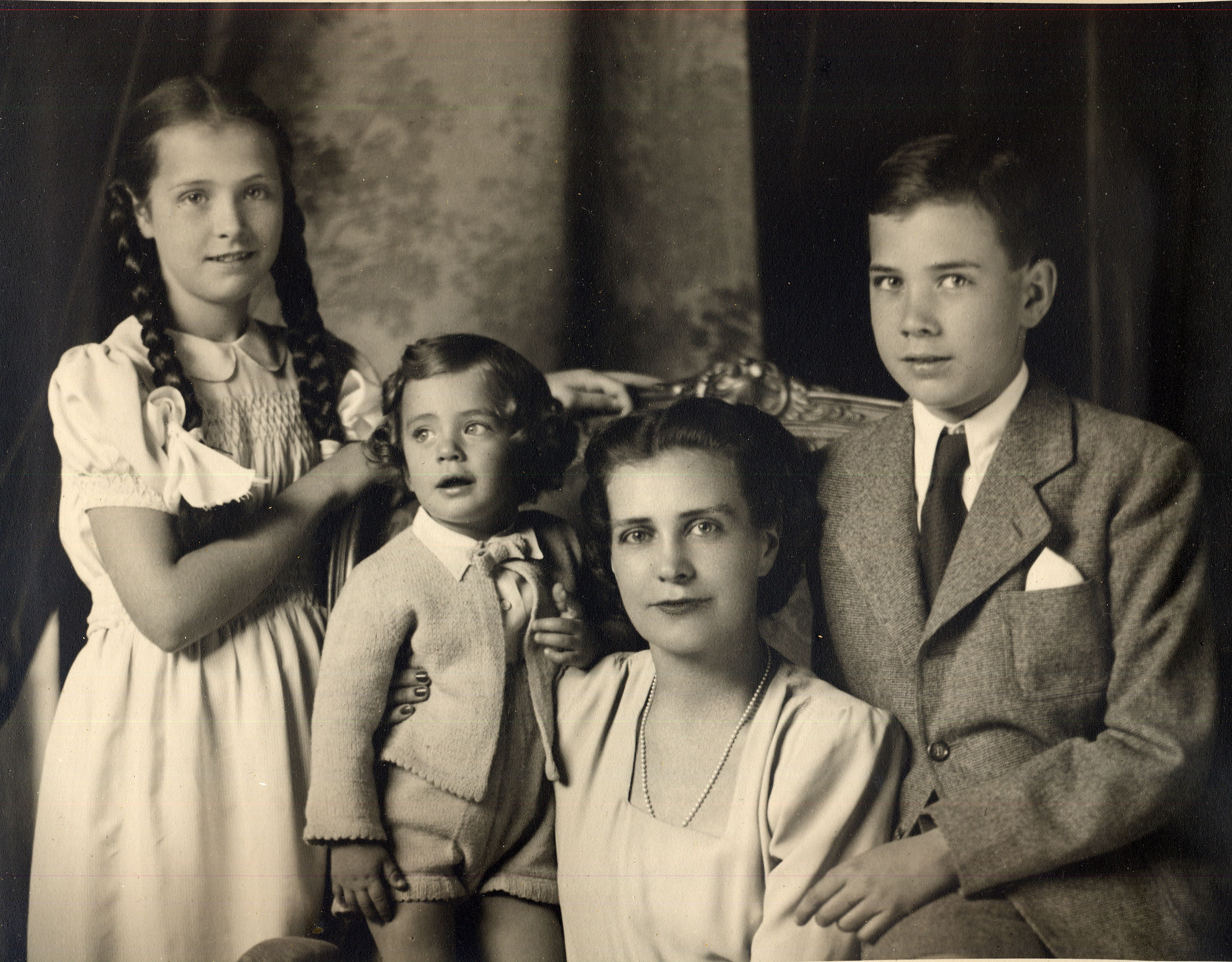
Eugen Filotti's family: his wife Elisabeta and his children Andrei, Domnica și Ion în the drawing room of the Romanian Legation of Budapest

On August 30, 1940, a week before the signature of the Treaty of Craiova, Romania had been obliged by the Second Vienna Award to cede Northern Transylvania to Hungary. Following diplomatic rules, after such important changes, diplomatic envoys in the two countries were usually replaced. Eugen Filotti was appointed the new Romanian minister plenipotentiary to Budapest.

The problems of the Romanian population on the territory of Hungary, which included Northern Transylvania were totally different from the ones of the Romanian minorities in Greece or Bulgaria, which had been Eugen Filotti's concern in his previous assignments. Immediately after the Vienna Award, the Hungarian authorities had taken violent actions against the Romanian population. Even before Eugen Filotti's arrival in Budapest, the Government of Romania had forwarded complaints to Berlin and to Rome, following which the Roggieri-Altenburg Commission was created to investigate the accusations brought either by Romania or by Hungary and to recommend corrective actions. Starting 1941, two subcommissions were set up, the first one in Brașov and the second in Cluj. The subcommissions were however taking action only in the case of complaints which had to present specific cases of oppressive measures. Therefore, the Romanian authorities were compelled to obtain not only general statements about such events, but detailed information, as precise as possible, regarding the alleged abuses of the Hungarians, in order to present their case to the commission as well fundamented as possible.

An important task of the Romanian legation in Budapest, as well as of the subordinated consulates in Cluj and Oradea was to obtain such information. As the inhabitants of the localities where abuses had taken place were prevented to go to the legation or to one of the consulates and the staff of the diplomatic units did not know where to go to find out what was really going on, this task was extremely difficult. Eugen Filotti was able to set up a system by which the required information could be collected so that he could transmit it to the Ministry of Foreign Affairs in Bucharest who, in turn, would forward the required documentation to the arbitration commission. With the help of Nicolae Colan, bishop of the Eastern Orthodox diocese of Vad, Feleac and Cluj and of Juliu Hossu, bishop of the Greek Catholic Diocese of Cluj-Gherla who, during the war, was seated in Oradea, priests from villages in which Romanians constituted a majority were informing their bishops about the situation in their parishes. The dioceses would then forward the pertinent information to Eugen Filotti, at the legation in Budapest, from where it was sent through diplomatic channels to Bucharest. Another active factor in this set-up was Nicolae Bălan, metropolite of Transylvania, whom Eugen Filotti met in Sibiu each time he returned to Romania, in order to coordinate the actions taken on religious and diplomatic channels.

Inevitably, the Hungarian authorities became aware of these activities. If they helped provide information to the Romanians, they also induced repressive actions against the Romanian clergy.

Except being subjected to repressive actions in their villages, there were frequent cases in which Romanians from Northern Transylvania were displaced for forced labour to Hungary, mostly for the maintenance of roads. They were however allowed to write letters to their relatives at home, informing them about where they were working. These informations were relayed to the Romanian legation in Budapest, and, in his capacity of plenipotentiary minister, Eugen Filotti visited these places to gain first hand information on how the Romanians were treated. There were several cases when the Hungarian guards treated Eugen Filotti offensively, disregarding his diplomatic status. Abuses committed on the territory of Hungary were beyond the authority of the Roggeri-Altenburg Commission. Therefore, on these matters Eugen Filotti forwarded protest notes directly to the Hungarian Ministry of Foreign Affairs in Budapest.

The Romanian educational system had been completely dismantled by the Hungarian authorities in Northern Transylvania. The entire Romanian population was compelled to complete the curriculum in Hungarian language. Romanian school books could neither be printed in Northern Transylvania nor be imported from Romania. Again, the Romanian church was the only organization which, through the clergy, could provide education in Romanian during Sunday religious courses. The Greek-Catholic diocese had its own printing presses in Oradea and could therefore edit a significant number of books in Romanian, covering various religious subjects. Eugen Filotti had frequent contacts with the church authorities in order to assess the needs as well as the ways of supporting these activities from Romania.

Starting 1943, the persecution of Jews in Hungary became harsher and after March 19, 1944, when the German army occupied Hungary and general Sztójaj Döme was installed as head of the new Hungarian government, these persecutions were further intensified. Under the Sztójaj government massive deportations of Jews towards Auschwitz and other extermination camps took place. The position of the Romanian government was the Jews in occupied Northern Transylvania were Romanian citizens and therefore were entitled to the protection of the Romanian authorities. As head of the Romanian diplomatic mission in Hungary, Eugen Filotti ordered that Romanian passports and other travel documents be issued to Jews of Northern Transylvania. This action was implemented with the help of the Romanian consuls Constantin Ţincu at the Budapest consulate and Mihai Marina at the Oradea consulate. The Oradea consulate also helped by illegally transporting Jews from Northern Transylvania to Romania in the consulate's automobiles. Based on information obtained from Dr. Kupfet Miksa, one of the leaders of the Jewish community in Oradea as well as on his own findings, consul Mihai Marina wrote a report documenting the deportation of Jews to German extermination camps forwarding it to Eugen Filotti. After reviewing it, Eugen Filotti chose to short circuit the Ministry of Foreign Affairs in Bucharest, and, in order to make sure that it became known to the international community, send it directly to Vespasian Pella, the Romanian minister plenipotentiary in Bern, who presented it to the International Committee of the Red Cross in Geneva.

In July 1944, Eugen Filotti came to Bucharest, in order to present to the Ministry of Foreign Affairs information regarding Northern Transylvania, necessary to prepare the Romanian claims at a future peace conference. At the same time, Eugen Filotti got actively involved with the diplomats who were preparing the coup which would take Romania out of the alliance with Germany, and make the country switch sides to join the Allies.

=== Secretary General of the Ministry of Foreign Affairs. ===
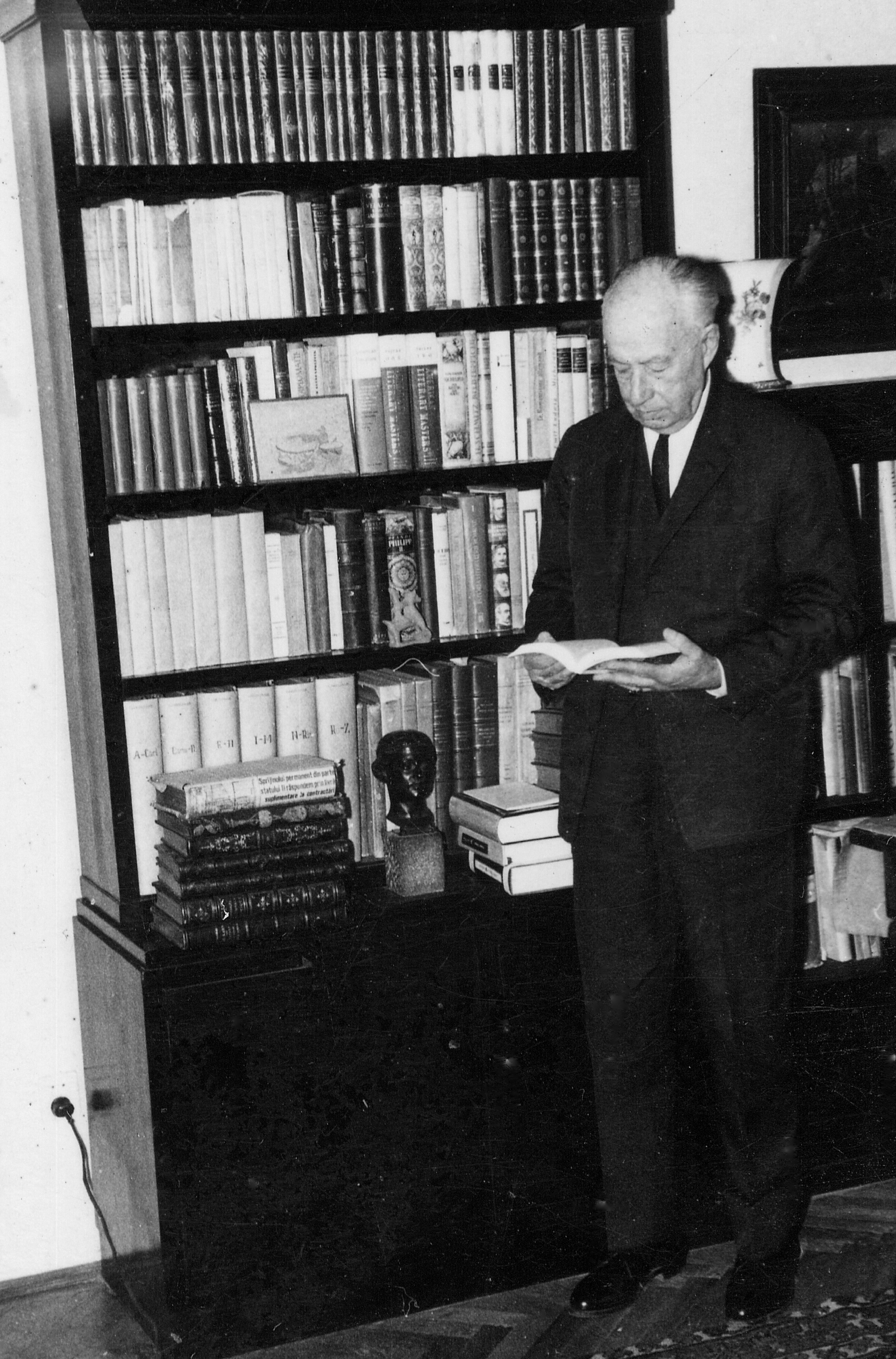
Eugen Filotti în 1971 at his residence in Bujoreni Street of București

Immediately after Romania switched sided on August 23, 1944, and joined the Allies, Eugen Filotti was appointed secretary general of the Ministry of Foreign Affairs, under foreign minister Grigore Niculescu-Buzești in the government headed by general Constantin Sănătescu. He kept the same position, under foreign minister Constantin Vișoianu in the following government, headed by general Nicolae Rădescu.

His first efforts in his new position was to inform all Romanian diplomatic missions abroad about the changes following King Michael's Coup and to send the corresponding instructions on actions to be taken by these missions. Also, as soon as the military situation in Bucharest was brought under control, he took steps to bring the staff of the Ministry of Foreign Affairs to Bucharest and to ensure its return to normal activity. Due to the allied bombing raids, the Romanian Ministry of Foreign Affairs had been evacuated to Băile Herculane. In September 1944, moving the ministry back to Bucharest implied difficulties, as the German artillery on the Yugoslav bank of the Danube prevented the use of the main road along this river. At the same time the German and Hungarian army had occupied the city of Arad and were advancing upstream the Mureș Valley, making the alternative route very risky.

Finally, according to prevailing diplomatic conventions, an exchange of diplomats which were posted at the diplomatic missions in Berlin, Budapest and Bratislava, capitals of countries still under German control, had to be organized. The negotiations were carried out with the help of the diplomatic missions of neutral countries: Switzerland and Sweden. Though an agreement of the involved governments was reached, the exchange of diplomats did not take place, because the Hungarian and Slovak diplomats in Bucharest, refused to return to their countries. As a result, the Romanian diplomats were kept in captivity in Germany until the end of the war.
