= Avrig (disambiguation) =

Avrig is a town in Sibiu County, Romania.

Avrig may also refer to:

- Avrig (river), tributary of the river Olt in Sibiu County, Romania
- Avrig Lake, mountain lake in Sibiu County, Romania
