= Pârâul Adânc =

Pârâul Adânc may refer to:

- Valea Adânca, a tributary of the Olt in Brașov County
- Pârâul Adânc, a tributary of the Cracăul Alb in Neamț County
- Pârâul Adânc, a tributary of the Avrig in Sibiu County
- Pârâul Adânc, a tributary of the Olt in Covasna County
