= Avrig =

- Town
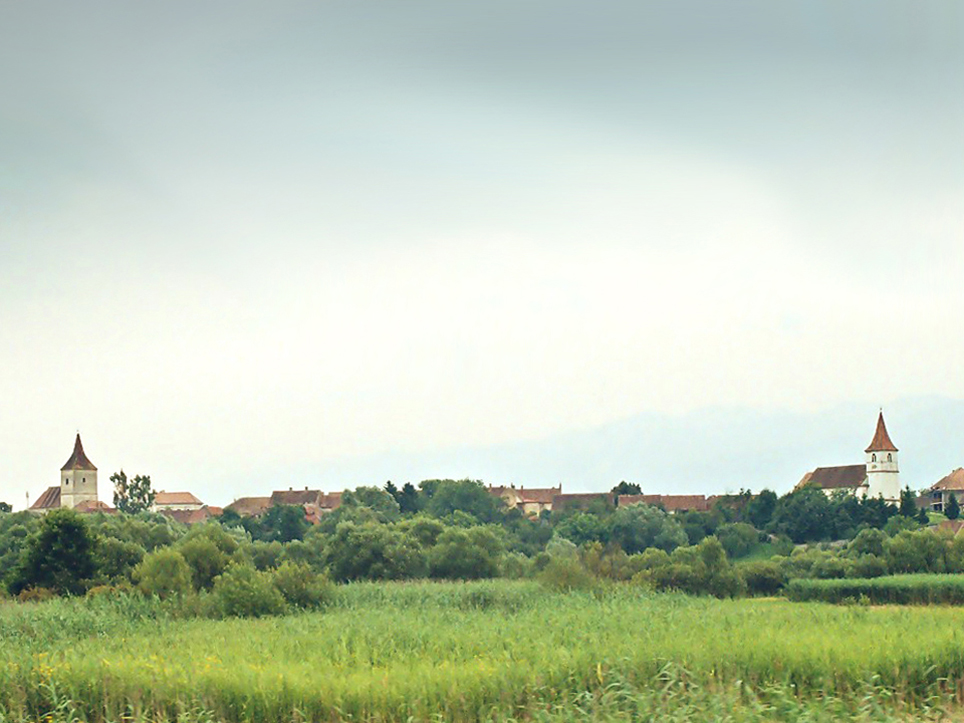
- Panoramic view of Avrig

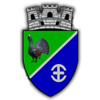
- Coat of arms

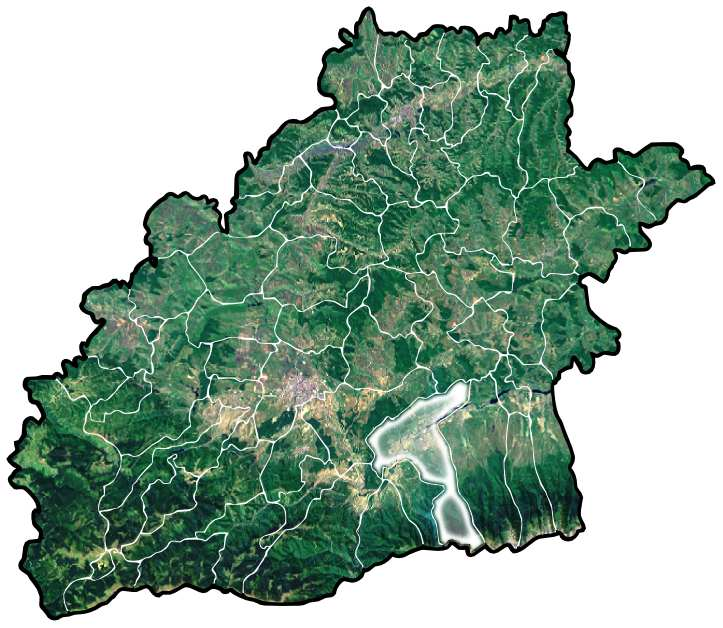
- Location in Sibiu County

- Location in Romania
- Coordinates: 45°42′29″N 24°22′29″E
- Country: Romania
- County: Sibiu

Government
  - Mayor (2024–2028): Adrian-Dumitru David (PNL)
- Area: 133.36 km^{2} (51.49 sq mi)
- Elevation: 390 m (1,280 ft)
- Population (2021-12-01): 12,534
  - Density: 93.986/km^{2} (243.42/sq mi)
- Time zone: UTC+02:00 (EET)
  - Summer (DST): UTC+03:00 (EEST)
- Postal code: 555200
- Area code: +(+40) 0269
- Vehicle reg.: SB
- Website: primaria-avrig.ro

Avrig (Romanian pronunciation: [aˈvriɡ]; German: Freck/Fryck, Transylvanian Saxon: Freck/Fraek, Hungarian: Felek) is a town in Sibiu County, Transylvania, central Romania. The first documents attesting its existence date to 1346. It officially became a town in 1989, as a result of the Romanian rural systematization program.

== Demographics ==
Historical population
Year	Pop.	±%
1992	14,965	—
2002	14,260	−4.7%
2011	12,815	−10.1%
2021	12,534	−2.2%
Source: Census data

At the 2011 census, Avrig had 12,815 inhabitants, of whom 95.6% were Romanians, 2.1% Hungarians, 1.5% Roma, and 0.5% Germans (Transylvanian Saxons). At the 2021 census, the town had a population of 12,534; of those, 86.45% were Romanians.

== Administration and local politics ==
=== Town council ===
The town's current local council has the following multi-party political composition, based on the results of the votes cast at the 2024 Romanian local elections:

Party	Seats	Current Council
National Liberal Party (PNL)	8	
Social Democratic Party (PSD)	4	
Alliance for the Union of Romanians (AUR)	3	
United Right Alliance (ADU)	2	

== Geography ==
The town administers four villages: Bradu (Gierelsau; Fenyőfalva), Glâmboaca (Hühnerbach; Glimboka), Mârșa and Săcădate (Sekadaten; Oltszakadát). It is situated in the historical region of Transylvania.

It lies on the left bank of the river Olt (at the mouth of the Avrig River), close to the Făgăraș Mountains, at about 26 km (16 mi) from Sibiu on the road towards Brașov. It is the main starting point for the trekking routes in the western part of the mountains, and also on access point at a great number of chalets in the mountains: Cabana Poiana Neamțului, Cabana Bârcaciu, Cabana Ghiocelul.

== Economy ==
Avrig SA Glass Factory, a company specialized in lime mouthblown glass, started its origins in Avrig in the 17th century.

Mârșa village is the site of the Mecanica Mârșa Works, which manufactures auto-trailers and military vehicles.

== Tourism ==
The most important objective in the town is the Brukenthal Summer Palace built in 1771, a baroque summer residence of baron Samuel von Brukenthal, the governor of Transylvania. Also two old churches can be found there: the evangelical church, built in the 13th century and fortified in the 16th century and the orthodox church, built in the 18th century.

Bradu village features a fortified church first attested in 1315, with the last major modification in 1804.

== Natives ==
- Romulus Cândea (1886 – 1973), ecclesiastical historian
- Gheorghe Lazăr (1779 – 1823), founder of the first Romanian-language school
- Vasile Stoica (1889 – 1959), diplomat
- Martin Tudor (1976 – 2020), footballer

== Image gallery ==
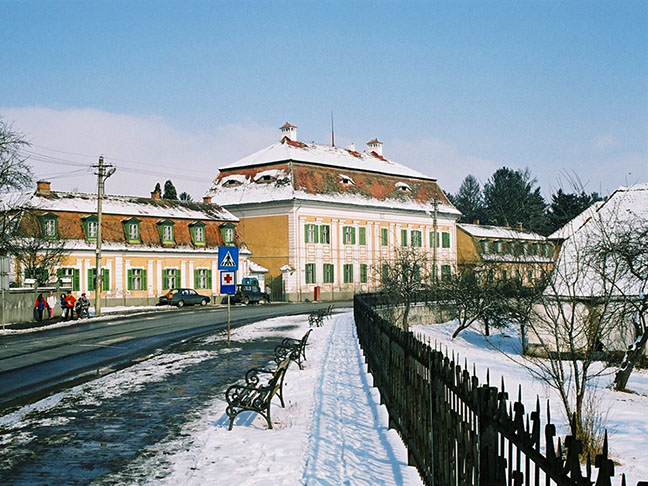
Brukenthal Summer Palace

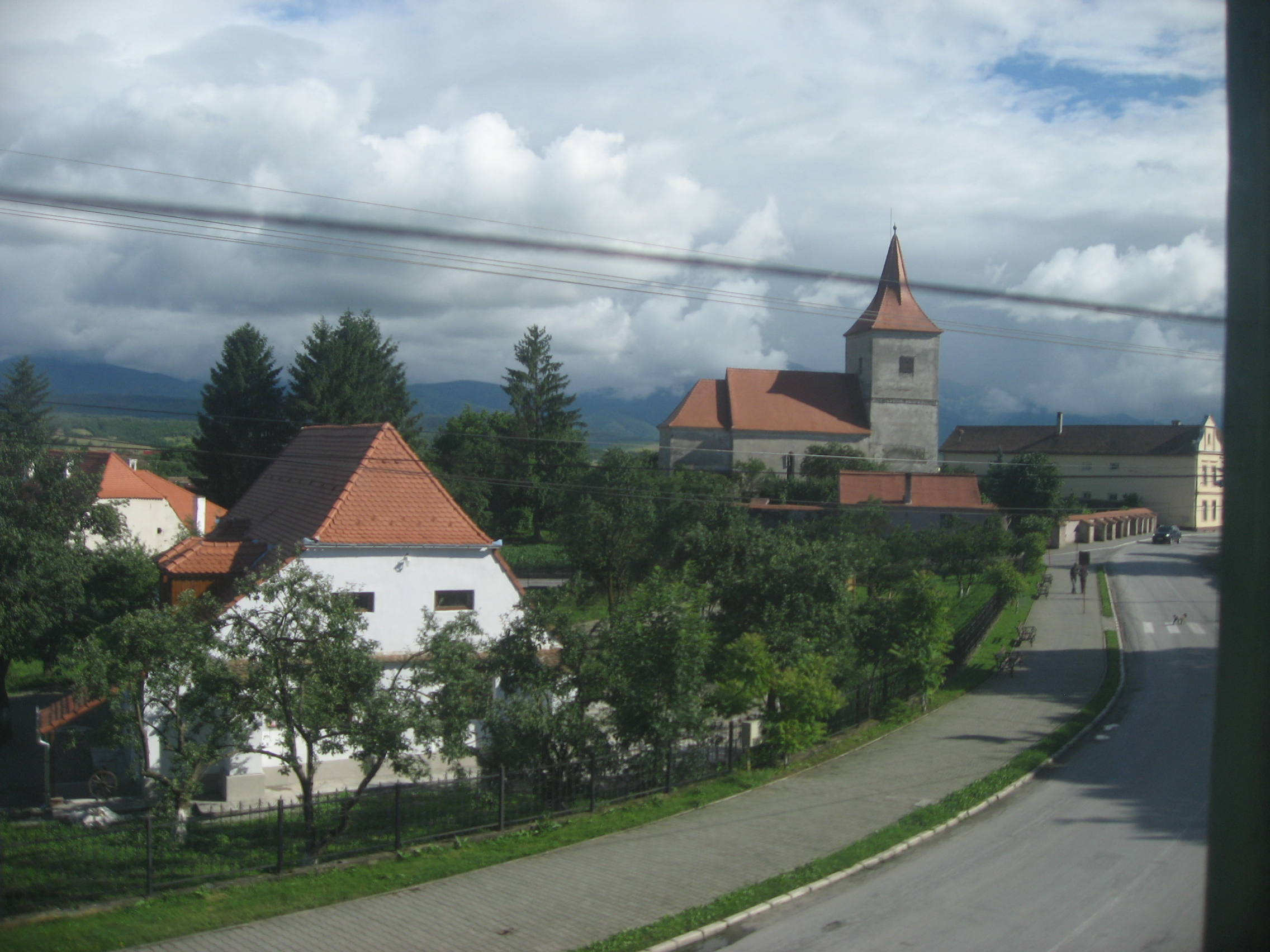
Avrig

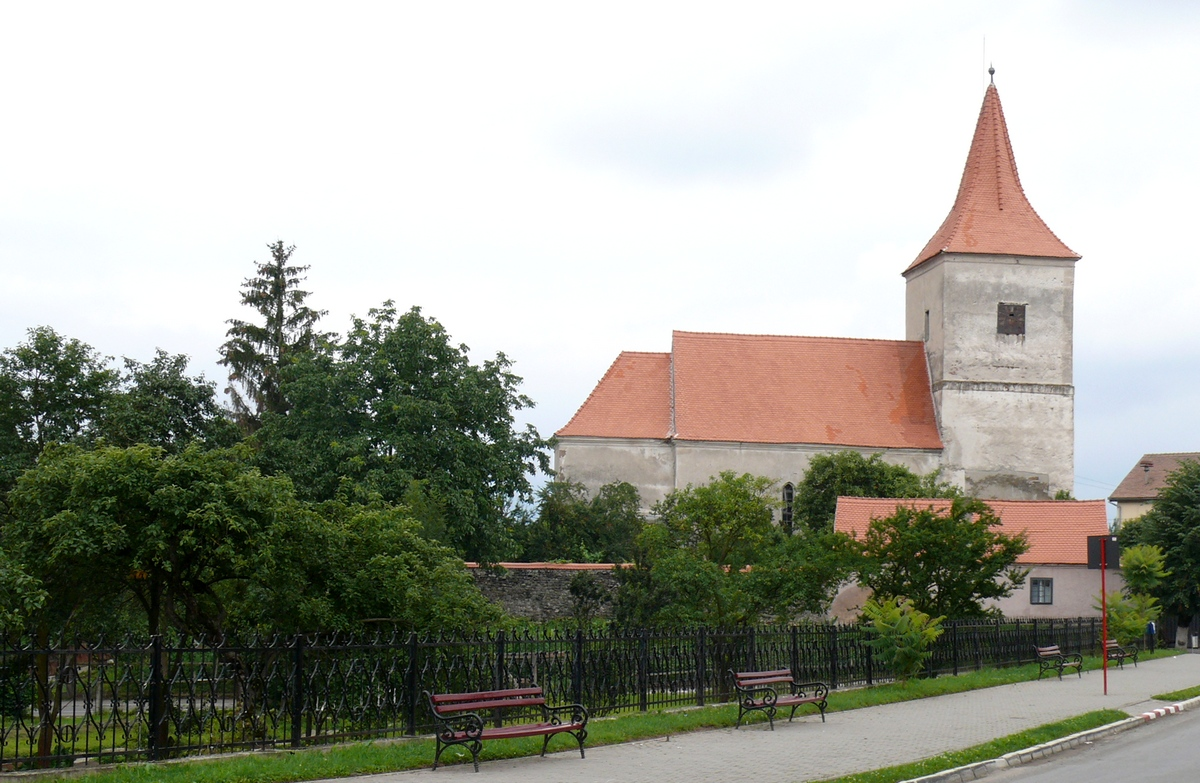
The medieval fortified Evangelical Lutheran Transylvanian Saxon church of Avrig

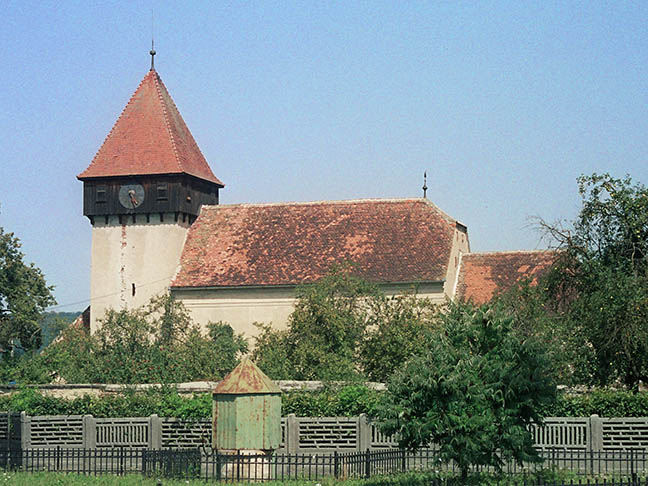
The medieval Evangelical Lutheran Transylvanian Saxon fortified church of Bradu village

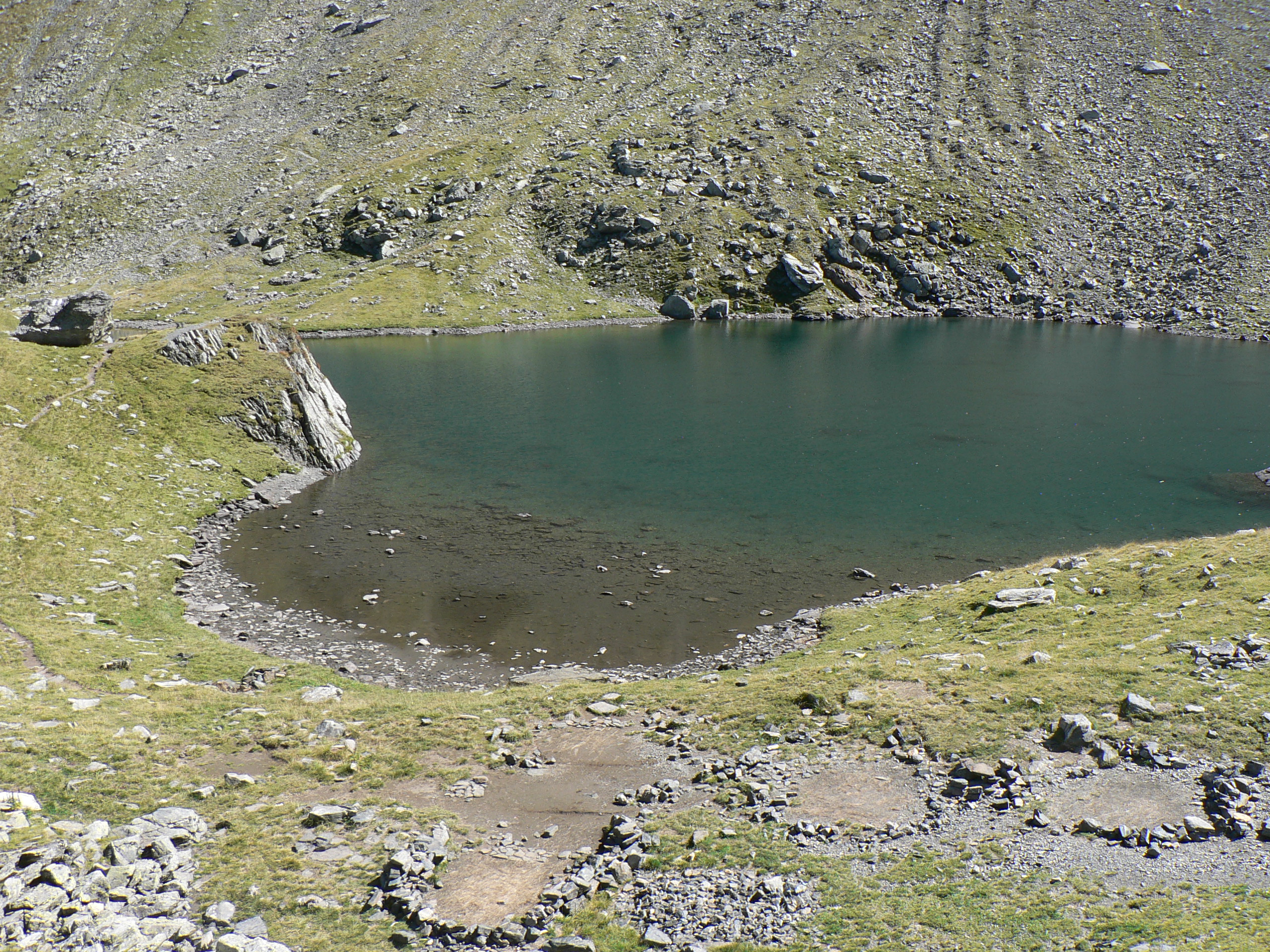
Avrig Lake

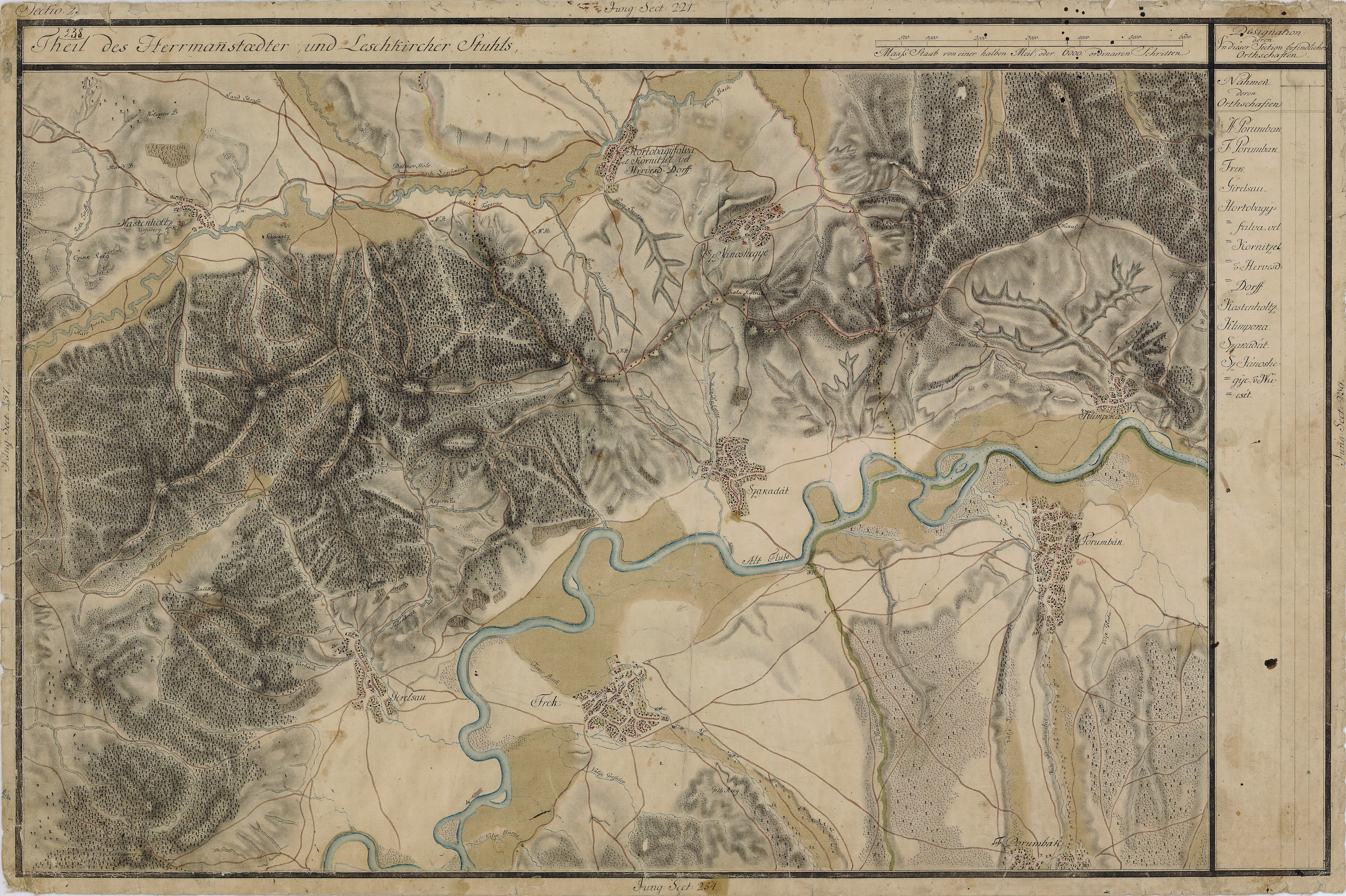
Avrig in the Grand Duchy of Transylvania, 1769-1773

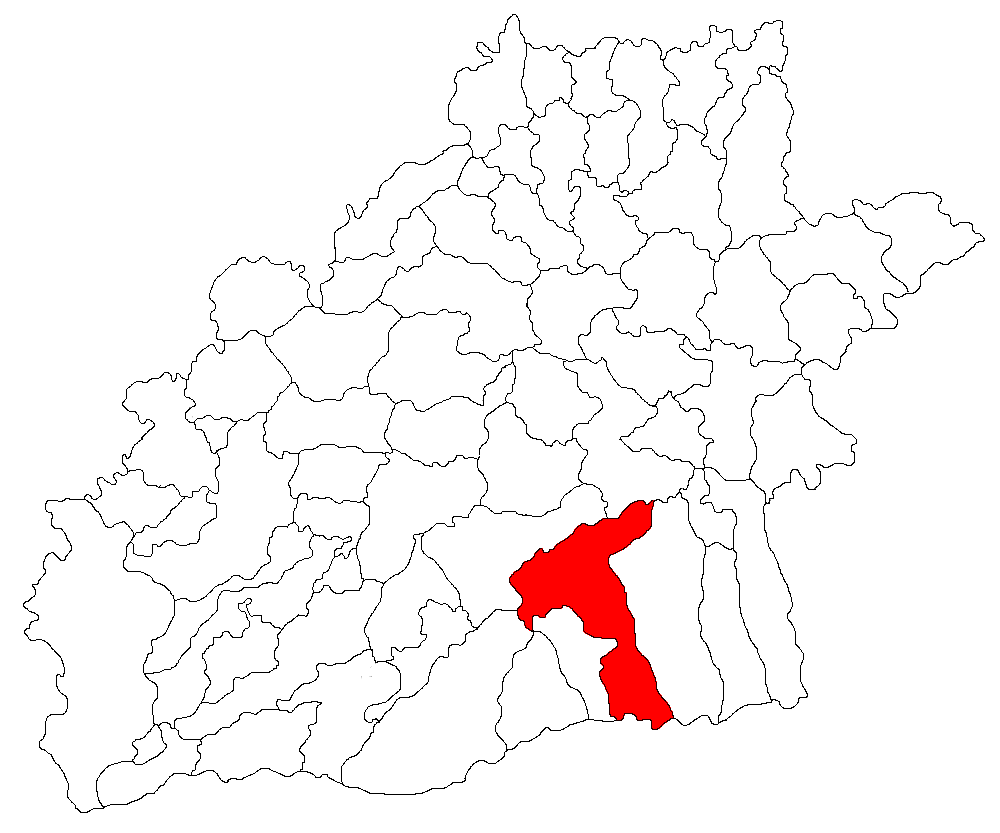
Avrig in Sibiu County
