= Mișcarea Literară =

Mișcarea Literară (Romanian for "The Literary Movement") was a literary and art weekly published in Romania from 1924 to 1925 by writer Liviu Rebreanu and poet Alexandru Dominic.

A new magazine with the same title was published, starting 2002 in the city of Bistrița.
