= Constantin Antoniade =

- Constantin Antoniade at the League of Nations, 1928
- Born: 16 August 1880; Bucharest, Principality of Romania
- Died: 19 July 1954 (aged 73); Madrid, Spain
- Education: University of Bucharest
- Occupations: Historian, diplomat, writer, philosopher, jurist

Constantin Antoniade (16 August 1880 – 19 July 1954) was a Romanian jurist, writer, historian, philosopher and diplomat of ethnic Greek heritage. As a historian he was a concerned mainly with the Renaissance. He also translated works of John Ruskin and Thomas Carlyle into Romanian.

Antoniade was born in Bucharest on 16 August 1880. After attending the city's Matei Basarab High School, he studied at the University of Bucharest, graduating with a law degree in 1902 and one in philosophy in 1903. He went on to obtain a Ph.D. in philosophy in 1907, with thesis Iluziunea realistă written under the supervision of Constantin Rădulescu-Motru.

He participated in the Paris Peace Conference of 1919 as juridical expert. As a diplomat he was Romanian representative to the League of Nations from 1928 to 1936. After the Communist regime took power in Romania, Constantin Antoniade received the authorization from Iuliu Maniu and Dinu Brătianu to make contacts in the western countries on behalf of the Romanian Liberal Party and the National Peasants' Party.

In 1948, Antoniade served as member of the Directing Committee of the Association for the Help of Romanian Refugees CAROMAN, created in Paris founded by Nicholas Caranfil as a representative of the Free Romanian Red Cross. The other members of the committee were Raoul Bossy, Mihai Răuț and Dan Geblescu.

He died in Madrid on 19 July 1954.

== Works ==
- C. Antoniade, Filosofia lui Henri Bergson - Studii filosofice, București, 1908, Vol. II
- Constantin Antoniade - Figuri din cinquecento: principese, curteni și curtizane - Fundatia pentru Literatura și Arta "Regele Carol II", București 1939
- Constantin Antoniade - Trois Figures de la Renaissance: Pierre Arétin, Guichardin, Benvenuto Cellini - Paris: Brouwer 1937.
- Constantin Antoniade - Machiavelli. Omul. Timpurile. Opera: vol. I, Secretarul florentin, vol. II, Politicul. Istoricul. Patriotul - București, Editura Cultura Națională, [1932], ed. a II-a [1934]; reedited: Timișoara, Editura Helicon, 1993.
