= Marc Darimont =

Landscape with a farm – Painting (oil on board) by Marc H. Darimont (1925)

Marc H. Darimont (1903 in Liège; date of death unknown) was a Belgian painter. He painted mainly expressionist landscapes and portraits, gradually evolving towards an increased simplicity and abstract compositions. He also produced drawings, book illustrations and prints.

Marc Darimont was a member of the Liège Modern Art Group and of Liège Royal Circle of Fine Arts.
