= Nicolae Lahovary =

Romanian diplomat

Nicolae Lahovary (Romanian pronunciation: [nikoˈla.e lahoˈvari]), 1887-1972, was a Romanian diplomat. He was minister plenipotentiary to Albania (1934–1936) and to Switzerland from 1940-1944 before being replaced by Vespasian Pella. In his capacity of envoy to Switzerland he was active in contacts with the representatives of the allies for ensuring an armistice. After he was recalled in 1944, he settled in Switzerland, where he was an active member of the Romanian exile.

Nicolae Lahovary also was an anthropologist. His main work “Dravidian Origins and the West” was published in Bombay posthumously in 1963.
