= Avrig Lake =

Glacial lake in Romania

Lacul Avrig
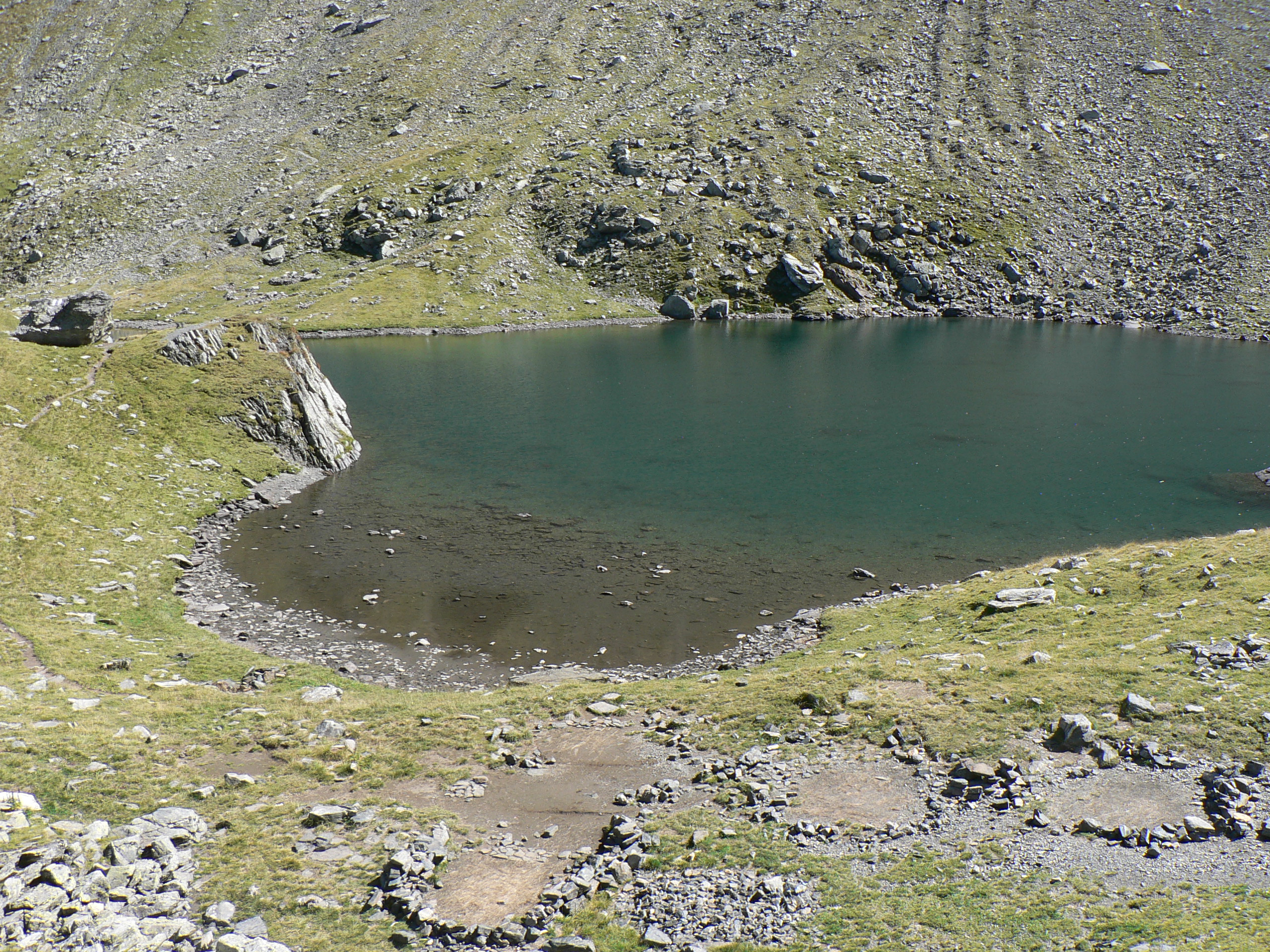
- Avrig Lake

- Location within Romania
- Location: Făgăraș Mountains
- Coordinates: 45°34′42″N 24°28′55″E
- Type: glacial
- Basin countries: Romania
- Max. length: 180 m (590 ft)
- Max. width: 100 m (330 ft)
- Surface area: 1.4 ha (3.5 acres)
- Max. depth: 4.5 m (15 ft)
- Surface elevation: 2,011 m (6,598 ft)

Avrig Lake (Romanian: Lacul Avrig) is a glacial lake situated in the Făgăraș Mountains of Romania, in the northeastern corner of Vâlcea County. It is situated at an altitude of 2,011 metres (6,598 ft). The lake surface is about 1.47 hectares (3.6 acres) and the deepest point reaches 4.5 metres (15 ft).

The lake has an approximately trapezoidal shape, with its length reaching around 180 metres (590 ft) from east to west, and a maximum width of around 100 metres (330 ft) from north to south. It is the origin of the Avrig River.

From a tourist's point of view, Avrig Lake is halfway between Suru Chalet and Negoiu Chalet.

From 2005 to 2008, volunteers cleaned the routes near the lake and the lake bottom down to 1.5 metres (4.9 ft) in depth. More than 1,075 kilograms (2,370 lb) of waste were collected and transported in backpacks down to the valley.

== Photo gallery ==
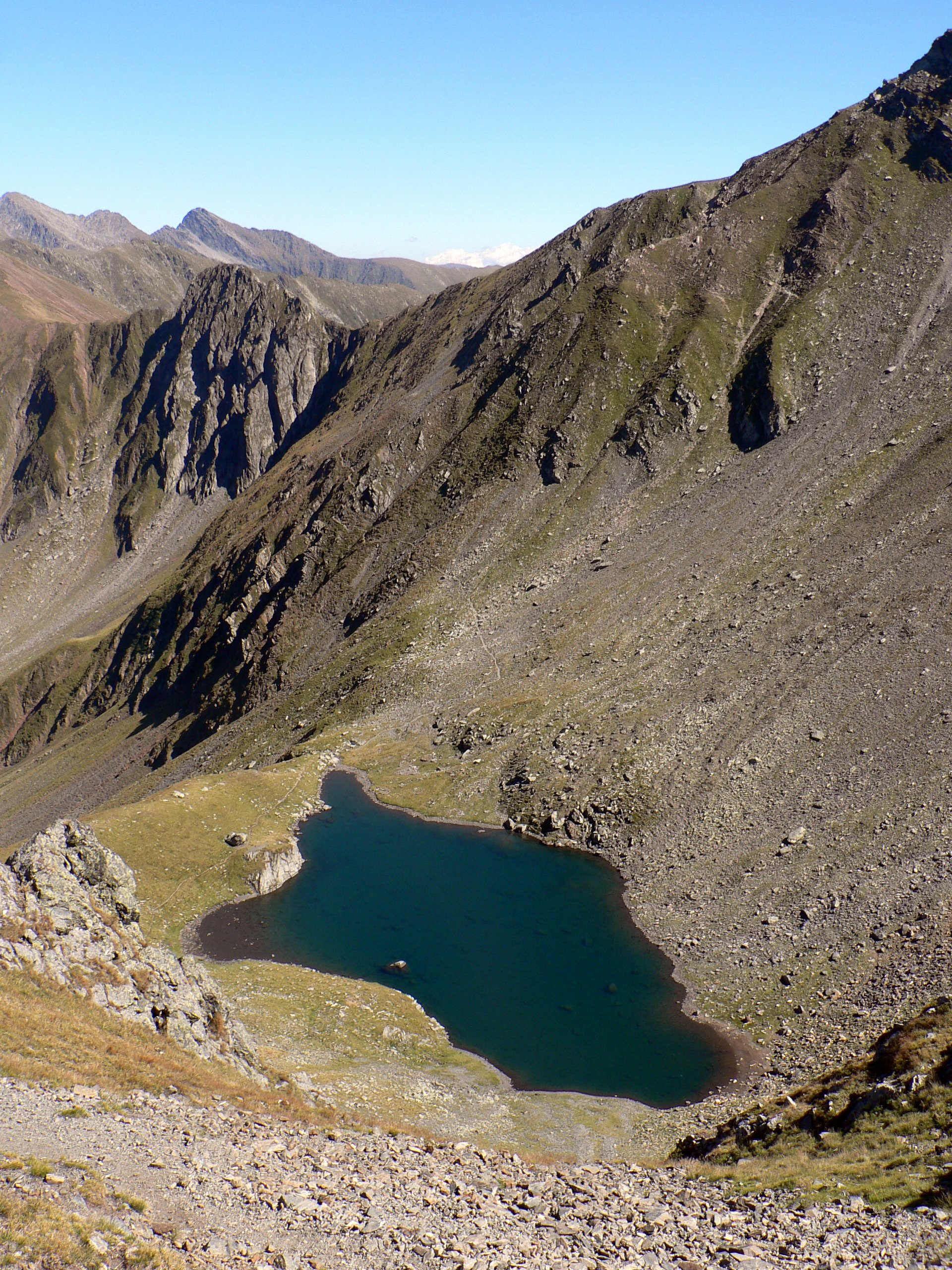

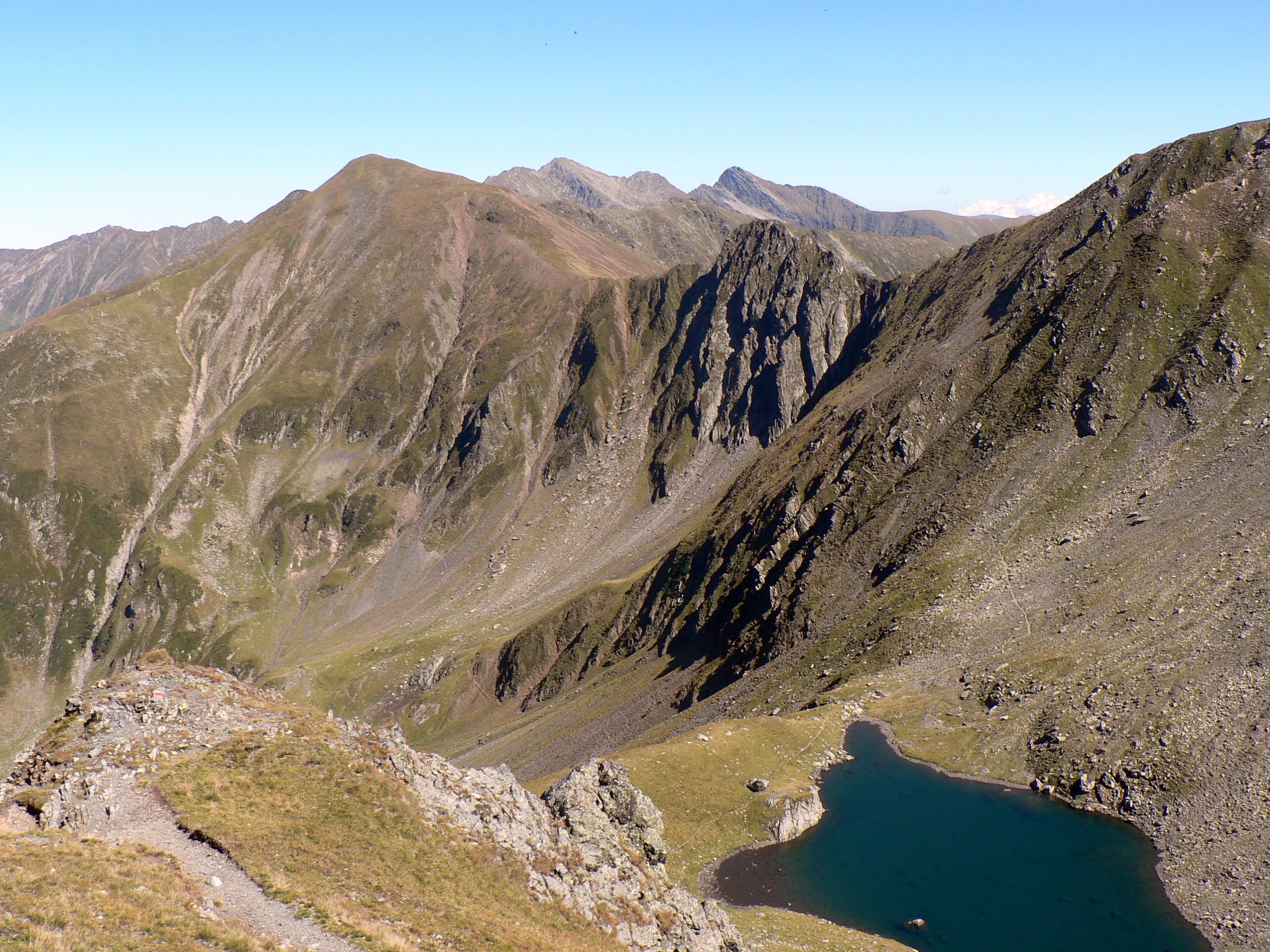
