= Mihail Arion =

Romanian diplomat

Mihail Arion was a diplomat for Romania. He started his career at the Romanian legation in Petrograd. After World War I he supported Nicolae Titulescu's policies. In 1934 he was appointed secretary general of the Ministry of Foreign Affairs. He was relieved of his duties on August 29, 1936, when Nicolae Titulescu was dismissed.
