= Victor Cădere =

Romanian diplomat and jurist (1891–1980)

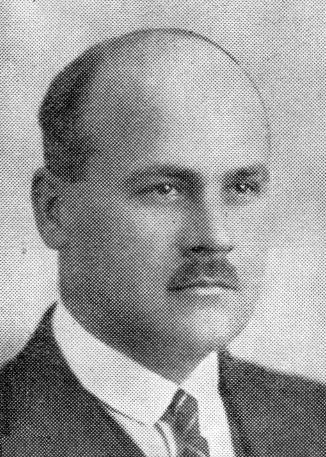
Victor Cădere

Victor Cădere (22 July 1891 – 11 February 1980) was a Romanian jurist, administrator and diplomat.

Born in Buhalnița, Neamț County, he got a doctorate in law. He was member or the Romanian delegation to the Peace Conference in Paris in 1919 and head of the Romanian Military Mission to the Far East (1920–1921). He was also professor at the law faculty of the University of Cluj. Under the reign of King Carol II of Romania, he also was secretary general of the Interior Ministry and royal resident of Ținutul Dunării.

As diplomat, he was minister plenipotentiary of Romania to Warsaw (1931–1935), Belgrade, and Lisbon (1942–1944).

Between 1933 and 1934, he was the president of FIDAC (The Interallied Federation of War Veterans Organisations). His son, Andrei, was born in 1934 and later became an artist.

Under the communist regime, he was arrested on 7 October 1952 and accused of espionage. Incarcerated at Jilava Prison and Sighet Prison, he was tried only in 1956 by a Military Court, being sentenced to 5 years of imprisonment, but was released on 20 September 1956.

Being able to leave Romania, he worked as Associate Professor of the University of Paris. Victor Cădere was corresponding member of the Institut de France. He died in Bagneux, at age 88.
