= Constantin Langa-Rășcanu =

Romanian diplomat

Constantin Langa-Răşcanu was a Romanian diplomat. He was the head of the Romanian delegation at the Vienna meeting with the delegation of the Soviet Union headed by N. N. Krestinsky.

The meeting had been convened after a preliminary discussion between Georgy Chicherin, People's Commissar of Foreign Affairs and Constantin Diamandy minister plenipotentiary of Romania. During that meeting, Georgy Chicherin had suggested that the Soviet Union recognize the unification of Bessarabia and Romania on condition that the Romanians give up the claims to the Romanian national treasure and the Romanian Crown Jewels which had been evacuated to Moscow during World War I and had not been returned.

The Vienna meeting took place in March–April 1924. Another point of contention was the Romanian national treasure . The auspices were not favorable, as just days before the meeting, the Soviets had created the Moldavian Autonomous Oblast on March 7, 1924, apparently to reinforce their claims on Bessarabia. Constantin Langa-Răşcanu's stated that the Romanian government wanted to separate the issues of Bessarabia and of the national treasure. Langa-Răşcanu also insisted that Romania was not willing to discuss its sovereignty over Bessarabia. Krestinsky countered that the Sfatul Țării had no right to decide the fate of the province in 1918 and he suggested that the fate of the province be decided by plebiscite. On instructions from prime-minister Ion I. C. Brătianu, Constantin Langa-Răşcanu rejected the Soviet demands and the talks collapsed.

The main assignment of Constantin Langa-Răşcanu was serving as minister plenipotentiary of Romania to Greece, where he was involved in the negotiations for the Balkan Pact. He was recalled in 1936.
