= Avrig (river) =

Avrig Râul Mare
- Location within Romania

Location
- Country: Romania
- Counties: Sibiu County
- Villages: Avrig

Physical characteristics
- Source: Avrig Lake, Făgăraș Mountains
  - elevation: 2,011 m (6,598 ft)
- Mouth: Olt
  - location: Avrig
  - coordinates: 45.7221°N 24.3433°E
  - elevation: 368 m (1,207 ft)
- Length: 24 km (15 mi)
- Basin size: 66 km^{2} (25 sq mi)
- Discharge
  - location: *
  - average: 1.23 m^{3}/s (43 cu ft/s)

Basin features
- Progression: Olt→ Danube→ Black Sea
- Tributaries
  - left: Jibrea

The Avrig is a left tributary of the river Olt in Romania. It discharges into the Olt in the town Avrig. The upper reach of the river is also known as the Râul Mare. Its source is the Avrig Lake in the Făgăraș Mountains. Its length is 24 km (15 mi) and its basin size is 66 km^{2} (25 sq mi).

There is a dam on the Avrig river for the water supply of the town Avrig and the village of Mârșa. The main bridges over the river are the Podul Jibrii and Podul lui Moise.

== Tributaries ==
The following rivers are tributaries to the river Avrig:

- Left: Racovița, Pârâul Adânc, Pârâul Șindrilei, Jibrea
- Right: Auriștea, Pârâul Stâncos, Comănesei
