= Vasile Grigorcea =

Romanian diplomat

Vasile Grigorcea (9 June 1883 – 1949) was a Romanian diplomat. His main assignments were minister plenipotentiary of Romania to Hungary, Poland, United Kingdom, and the Vatican.

He was born in Storojineț, the son of Ioan de Grigorcea and Ana Giurgiuvan. After completing his secondary studies at the German High School in Czernowitz in 1901, he studied law at the University of Czernowitz. In 1920 he joined the Romanian diplomatic corps.

His assignment to Hungary was cut short on September 30, 1936 due to the reshuffling of the Romanian diplomatic corps after the dismissal of Nicolae Titulescu. As minister to Poland he arrived in Warsaw on August 30, 1939, replacing Richard Franasovici. He could not present his credentials before the outbreak of World War II.

In 1940 he was appointed minister plenipotentiary to the Vatican. In this capacity he negotiated with the Vatican the relations of the Romanian Greek Catholic Church whose dioceses had been divided after Northern Transylvania had been ceded to Hungary following the Second Vienna Award. He was recalled in 1941, being replaced by general Dănilă Papp, a change which angered the Vatican. In 1943, Ion Antonescu, the Romanian Prime Minister, requested that King Michael I of Romania dismiss baron Ioan Mocsony-Stârcea, marshal of the Royal Court. Grigorcea was proposed as one of the possible candidates, but declined the offer.

In the fall of 1943, Grigorcea was reappointed minister plenipotentiary to the Vatican. He discussed the concerns of Pope Pius XII regarding the Moscow Declaration and the dangers foreseen for the future of Eastern Europe.

He is buried in Sinăuții de Sus.

== Bibliography ==
- Preda, Dumitru; Bucur, Marius. "1940–1945. Ințelegere și sprijin din partea Vaticanului" (in Romanian). Archived from the original on 2008-10-03.
- Potra, George G. (1998), "Reacții necunoscute la demiterea lui Titulescu 29 August 1936: O "mazilire perfidă"", Magazin Istoric (in Romanian), no. 6
- Otu, Petre. "Mareșalul dispune, regele impune" (in Romanian). Archived from the original on 2008-10-03.
