= Savel Rădulescu =

Romanian diplomat

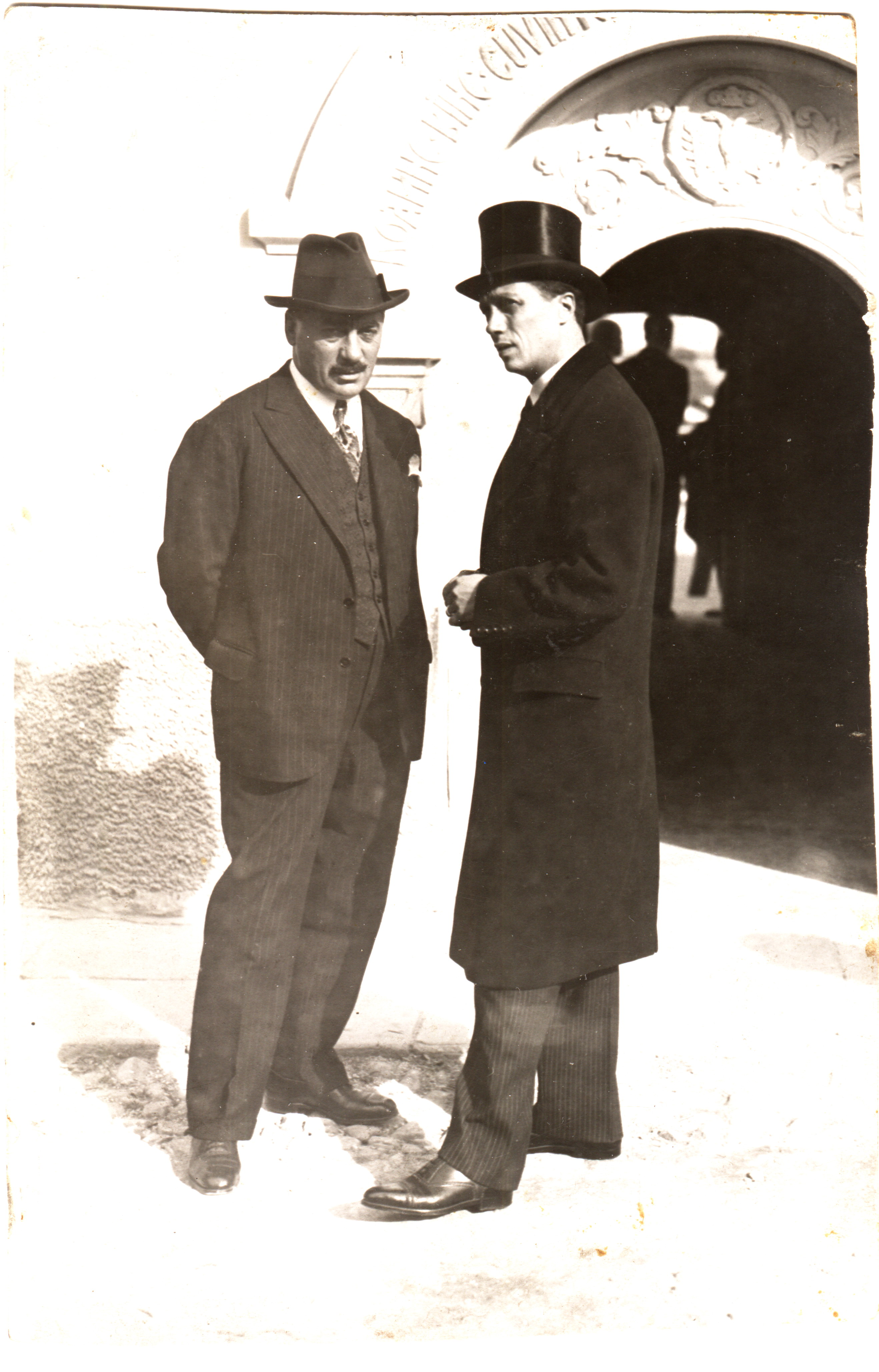
Savel Rădulescu (right) and Mihai Ispasiu (left), the political and financial consultants of Nicolae Titulescu during his function as a Minister of Foreign Affairs in the government of Romania, speak in front of the entrance into the old Monastery of Sinaia, Romania.

Savel Rădulescu (October 19, 1885 – August 27, 1970) was a Romanian diplomat. He started his career in 1921 and worked as secretary of Nicolae Titulescu at the League of Nations. For his diplomatic activity he was distinguished with the Order of Malta.

He was undersecretary of the Ministry of Foreign Affairs in the following governments:

- October 21, 1932 – January 13, 1933 in the Iuliu Maniu Government.
- January 14, 1933 – November 9, 1933 in the Alexandru Vaida-Voevod Government
- November 14, 1933 – December 29, 1933 in the Ion G. Duca Government
- December 30, 1933 – January 3, 1934 in the Constantin Angelescu Government
- January 5, 1934 – October 1, 1934 in the first Gheorghe Tătărescu Government
- October 10, 1934 – August 29, 1936 in the second Gheorghe Tătărescu Government

In September 1944 he was appointed Chairman of the Romanian Commission for the Application of the Armistice with the allies. He protested against the abuses of occupying forces of the Soviet Union and of the continued increase of the war reparations demanded. In 1946 he sent an official complaint to the representatives of the United States, the United Kingdom and the Soviet Union. In 1946 he also was part of the Romanian delegation to the Paris Peace Conference.

After the instauration of the communist regime, Lucrețiu Pătrășcanu, Gheorghe Gheorgiu-Dej, and Ana Pauker demanded in an ultimatum to King Michael that the "murderer" Savel Rădulescu, be at once arrested and punished (along with general Nicolae Rădescu and Iuliu Maniu).

In 1948 he was arrested and detained at the Craiova, Jilava, and Ocnele Mari prisons. In 1951 he was sentenced to 2 years of confinement and thereafter to 8 years forced labour, for the complaint he had written in 1946. He died in Bucharest in 1970.
