= Vasile Stoica =

Romanian diplomat (1889–1959)

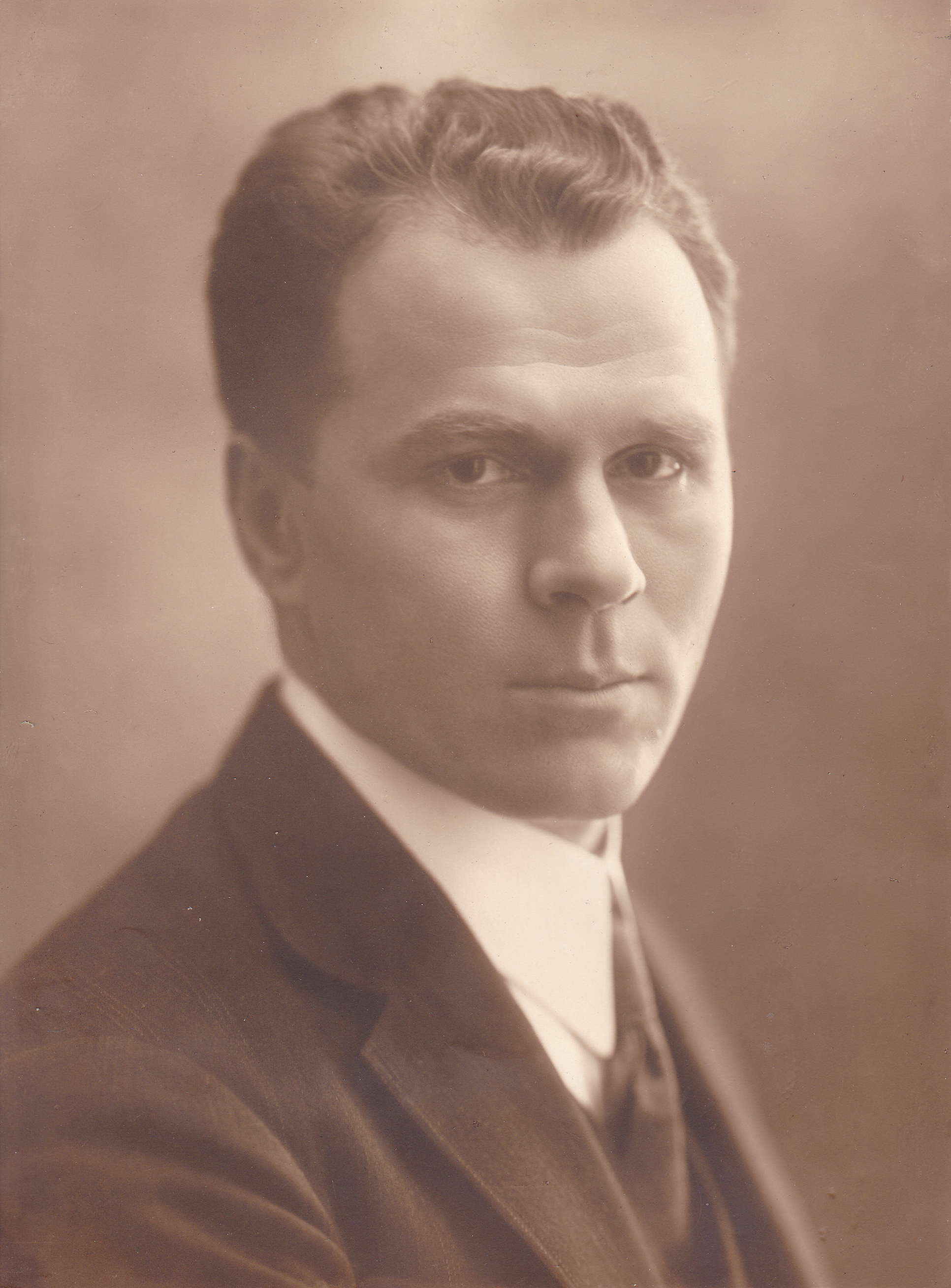
- Vasile Stoca

Vasile Stoica (Romanian pronunciation: [vaˈsile ˈstojka], also known as Basil Stoica; January 1, 1889 – July 27, 1959) was a Romanian political writer, diplomat, and close assistant of European statesmen Tomáš Masaryk and Ion I.C. Brătianu.

== Early life and education ==
Stoica was born in a family that originated from Transylvania (then in the Hungarian half of Austria-Hungary, but now in Romania); according to his birth certificate, Vasile Stoica was born in Avrig on January 1, 1889. He was the son of Maria and Gheorghe Stoica, Romanians belonging to the Christian Orthodox faith. He attended elementary school in Avrig.

His interest for the politics is proved by his status as one of the members of the Romanian National Party of Transylvania and Banat, from 1909.

From September the same year, Vasile Stoica followed the courses of Literature at Budapest University, until 1913; two semesters at University of Paris Faculty of Letters. In October 1913, he became president of the cultural organization of the "Petru Maior" ethnic Romanians undergraduates in Budapest.

== World War I ==
Upon Austria-Hungary's declaration of war on Serbia that led to the outbreak of World War I, Vasile Stoica was a teacher. In August–September, Stoica worked as a redactor-answerable at Românul, the leading Romanian language newspaper in Austria-Hungary. In October 1914, he choose to leave the Empire to avoid conscription, and headed for Bucharest, in still-neutral Romania.

He tried to work for the Romanian Army, in the new Air Force, but he was rejected. He carried on his activity of publicist to the newspapers Adevărul, Universul, Flacăra, Naționalul. Meanwhile, he abnegated his Austro-Hungarian citizenship for the Romanian one. At the Congress of Romanians refugees to Romania, in March 1915, Stoica stated that "the desire to be a part of a great and free Romania is not the result of the context". The introduction to the book Habsburgii, ungurii și românii ("The Habsburgs, the Hungarians and Romanians"), dated May 1, written by Vasile Stoica and Ion Rusu Abrudeanu. The authors plead for Romanian intervention against Austria-Hungary. In August, Stoica lead the Congress of the undergraduates in Galaţi. He published another, more radical book, Suferințele din Ardeal ("Sufferings in Transylvania"), in Bucharest in the summer of 1916. The young author’s book is a "declaration of war" against Austria-Hungary. In June, an Austro-Hungarian Army court-martial in Cluj sentenced him to death in absentia.

At the end of August 1916, the Romanian government, impressed by the early success of the Brusilov Offensive, declared war on Germany and Austria-Hungary. King Ferdinand’s Proclamation to the Army, drafted by Stoica along with the proclamation for the Romanian public opinion, read:

"You will fight alongside the great nations we are united with. Bloody battles are waiting you, but bravely enduring their hardness and with God’s help the victory will be ours".

He subsequently fought in the Romanian Army against invading German forces in Oltenia, and followed the Romanian troops in their retreat to Moldavia. In March 1917, Stoica (by then a second lieutenant) was a member of a group of exiled Romanian Habsburg subjects who were sent as a delegation to the United States to campaign Romania's cause. The envoys also established close contacts with the Czech Tomáš Masaryk and the Polish Ignacy Jan Paderewski.

He was instrumental in the creation of the Romanian National League of America in July, some months after America joined the Entente forces; among other things, the League, centered in Youngstown, Ohio, helped direct the war effort and participation of the Romanian-American community towards the US forces on the Western Front.

Stephen P. Duggan wrote on December 10, 1920:

"He has been over every part of [the United States]. He has come in contact with university professors, financiers, industrialists, [and Romanian-Americans]. He has made a district success wherever he went, as much a social success as an official success. It will take a new man a long time to learn as much as Captain Stoica and to secure the confidence of Americans in the way he has. Because of my official position, I have come during the war period, in contact with the representatives of all the foreign nations, and no one of them has impressed more favourably than Captain Stoica".

== Personal life ==
Vasile Stoica married Ines (Nessy) Longhi de Sobione. Born January 21, 1898 in Parma, Italy, she came to Romania in 1927. Their marriage ended in divorce sometime prior to 1940. Ines Longhi died on February 16, 1956 while married to her second husband, Carol Ardeleanu (né Köhler), an ethnic German from Transylvania.

== Postwar imprisonment under Communist rule ==
He was imprisoned from 1948 to 1954 and in 1957 was arrested again and sentenced to 10 years in prison. He died in Jilava Prison in 1959.
