= Vespasian Pella =

Romanian international law expert (1897-1952) and nobel prize nominee (1926)

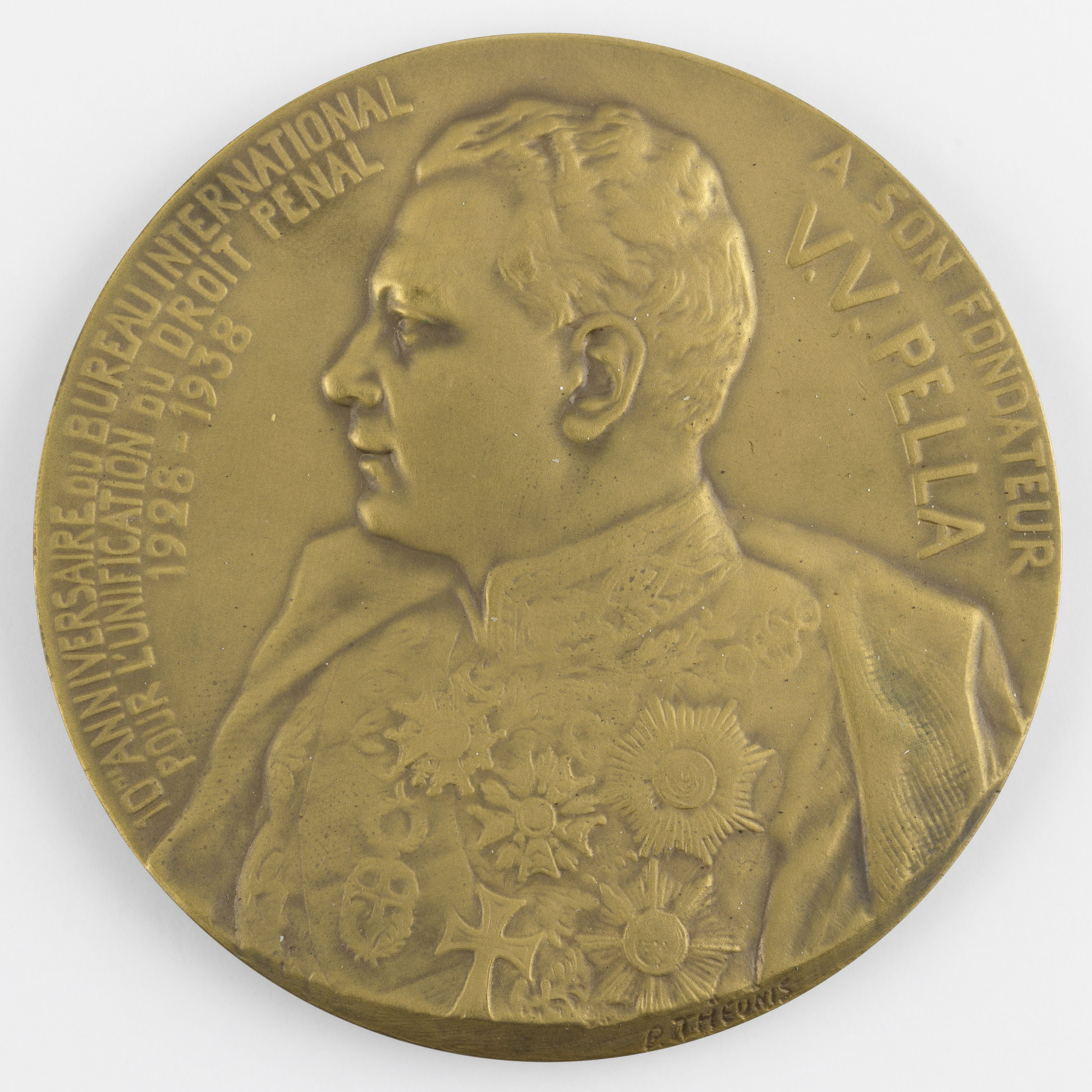
Vespasian Pella on a Belgian medal

Vespasian V. Pella (4/17 January 1897, in Bucharest – 24 August 1952, in New York City) was a Romanian international law expert.

He taught at the Alexandru Ioan Cuza University and the University of Bucharest, and lectured at the Geneva Graduate Institute, The Hague Academy of International Law, and the Institute of Higher International Studies in Paris.

== Legal career and opinions ==
During the interwar period, he promoted the notion of international criminal proceedings against heads of state found guilty of crimes against humanity by the establishment of a special international tribunal for that purpose. In 1938 he served as President of the Committee on Legal Questions of the League of Nations.

He was elected a corresponding member of the Romanian Academy in 1943.

In 1944 he was appointed Romanian Ambassador to Switzerland, and in that capacity saved several Romanian Jews from deportation to Nazi occupied Poland.

In 1948, he took part in formulating the Convention on the Prevention and Punishment of the Crime of Genocide .

He kept advocating the idea of establishing an international criminal court and, in 1950, presented his proposals to that effect to the International Law Commission (UN document A/CN.4/39), which deliberated over the issue in its meetings of 5 to 6 July 1950.

== Works ==
=== Books ===
- La criminalité collective des états et le droit pénal de l'avenir, Bucarest : Imprimerie de l'état, 1925
- "Vers l'unification du droit pénal par la création d'un Institut international auprès de la Société des Nations", (1928) 3 Études Crimin. 49–56
- La Guerre-Crime et les Criminels de Guerre, Paris, 1946
- The International Association of Penal Law and the Safeguarding of Peace, Paris, 1947

=== Articles ===
- "Towards an International Criminal Court" American Journal of International Law, Vol. 44, 1950, p. 37
