= Raoul Bossy =

Romanian diplomat and historian

Raoul V. Bossy (1894–1975) was a Romanian diplomat.

He pursued his university studies at the Sorbonne, in Paris, where he graduated as Licentiate in Law. He continued his studies at the Diplomatic Section of the École Libre des Sciences Politiques (Diplomatic Section), in Paris.

Bossy started his career as diplomat in 1918, after the end of World War I, being private secretary of the Minister of Foreign Affairs.

His next assignment was Second Secretary of the Romanian legation in Rome (1921–23). In this interval he also was a member of the Romanian delegation to the League of Nations. Raoul Bossy was also member of the Romanian delegation to the Economical International Conference in Genoa (April 10-May 19, 1922) and Romanian Delegate to the International Agricultural Institute in Rome. In 1923 he was recalled and worked as political advisor at the Prime Minister's Office under Ion I.C. Brătianu (1923–26). He then returned to Rome as first secretary of the Romanian legation (1926–27). During the minority of King Michael of Romania (1927–30) he was appointed secretary general of the Regency, returning to his diplomatic career as counsellor of Romanian legation in Vienna (1931–34).

In 1934 he was promoted minister plenipotentiary, being assigned to head the legations in Helsinki (1934–36), Budapest (1936–39), Rome (1939–40), Bern (1940–41) and Berlin (1941–43).

In 1943 he resigned because of his disagreements with the policies of Ion Antonescu, being appointed Permanent Delegate and Chief Liaison Officer of the Romanian Red Cross to the International Committee of the Red Cross in Geneva, the League of Red Cross Societies, and the International Union for Child Welfare.

Raoul Bossy was member of the

- Académie Diplomatique Internationale of Paris
- Romanian Association for a United Europe
- Ecole Libre des Sciences et des Lettres
- University Institute Carol I of Paris
- Romanian Royal Society of Geography.

Raoul Bossy has also lectured in Canada under the sponsorship of the Canadian Institute of International Affairs of Toronto.

== Works ==
- Politica externă a României între anii 1873–1880, privită dela Agenția diplomatică din Roma. Academia Română, Studii și cercetări 14. București: Cultura Natională, 1928. On Romanian foreign policy between 1873 and 1880.
- Agenția diplomatică a României în Paris şi legăturile politice franco-române sub Cuza-Vod. București: Cartea Românească, 1931.

On political relations between France and Romania.

- “Agenția diplomatică a României la Belgrad și legăturile politice româno-sârbe sub Cuza Vodă.” Academia Română, Memoriile secțiunii istorice, s. 3, t. 15 (1934), mem. 1: 2-59. On political relations between Romania and Serbia between 1859 and 1866.
- Mărturii finlandeze despre România. București: Cartea Românească, 1937. On memoirs of Finnish officers in the Russian armies that occupied Romania in the 19th century.
- “Urme românești în Miază-Noapte : 1. Altă replică a portretului lui Mihai Viteazul; 2. Cheia cetății Hotinului.” Academia Română, Memoriile secțiunii istorice, s. 3, t. 19 (1937), mem. 3: 47-49.
- L’Autriche et les Principautés-Unies. Académie roumaine, Etudes et recherches 10. Bucarest: Moniteur officiel et Imprimerie de l’Etat, Imprimerie Nationale, 1938. On relations between Austria and the Romanian Principalities.
- “Vechi năzuințe federaliste în sud-estul Europei: memoriu prezentat in ședința deia 9 Februare 1940.” Academia Română, Memoriile secțiunii istorice, s. 3,

t. 22 (1939–1940): 437-451. On south-eastern trends towards European federation.

- “Propaganda austriacă împotriva unirii principatelor.” Academia Română, Memoriile secțiunii istorice, s. 3, t. 24 (1941): 1-9. On Austrian propaganda against the unification of the Romanian principalities.
- “Un drumeț danez în principate.” Academia Română, Memoriile secțiunii istorice, s. 3, (1941). A Danish traveller in the Romanian principalities.
- “L’idée fédéraliste dans le centre et le sud-est de l’Europe.” Cahiers du Monde Nouveau 5/1 (janvier 1949): 29-36. On trends toward federalism in central and south-east Europe.
- “Les nations de l’Est et la fédération européenne.” Bulletin Européen 2/8-9 (août-septembre 1951): 3. https://web.archive.org/web/20120327002743/http://www.fondazionedragan.org/media/08_09_1951_be_fr_agosto_settembre.pdf
- Bossy, Raoul (1951). "Romania: Barrier Nation". International Journal. 7 (1): 23–29. doi:10.2307/40197578. JSTOR 40197578.
- “Religious Persecutions in Captive Romania.” Journal of Central European Affairs 15 (July 1955).
- BOSSY, RAOUL (1959). "Romanian Contributions to Federalism in the Xixth Century". The Polish Review. 4 (1/2): 83–90. JSTOR 25776224.
- BOSSY, RAOUL (1960). "Napoleon III and the Submerged Nationalities". The Polish Review. 5 (2): 110–117. JSTOR 25776310.
- “L’alliance entre le prince Alexandre-Jean Couza de Roumanie et les princes Miloch et Michel Obrénovitch de Serbie.” Revue des études roumaines 7-8 (1961): 60-69.
- “La diplomatie russe et l’union des principautés roumaines (1858-1859) d’après la correspondance Gortchakoff-Giers.” Revue d’histoire diplomatique 76/3 (juillet-septembre 1962): 255-266. Russian diplomacy and the unification of the Romanian principalities.
- “Elizabethans and Romanians.” The Polish Review 8/4 (Autumn 1963): 81-90.
- “Gobineau et la politique des nationalités.” Revue d’histoire diplomatique 78.1 (mars 1964): 35-40.
- "Recunoașterea oficială a numelui " România "." Ființa românească 4 (1966): 101-115.
- "Les Roumains et l'idée fédéraliste au XIX^{e} siècle." Revue d'histoire diplomatique 81/2 (juin 1967): 168-175.
- "Projet de bloc neutre en 1939." Revue d'histoire diplomatique 82/4 (octobre-décembre 1968): 358-368.
- "L'entrée en guerre de la Roumanie vue par le Grand-duc Nicolas Michaïlovitch (1916)." Revue d'histoire diplomatique 87/3-4 (juillet-décembre 1973).
- Amintiri din viața diplomatică (1918–1940). 2 vol. Ed. Stelian Neagoe. București: Humanitas, 1993. (ISBN 9732803789, ISBN 973-28-0379-7,9732803799, 9732804297)
- Recollections of a Romanian Diplomat, 1918-1969: Diaries and Memoirs of Raoul Bossy. Ed. and trans. G.H. and M.-A. Bossy. 2 vol. Stanford, California: Hoover Institution Press, Stanford University Press, 2003. (ISBN 0817929517, ISBN 0-8179-2952-5)
- Jurnal :2 noiembrie 1940 – 9 iulie 1969. Ed. Ion Mamina. București: Editura Enciclopedică, 2001. (ISBN 9734503723)

== Sources ==
- Neagoe, Stelian. "Studiu introductiv." In Bossy, Raoul V. Amintiri din viaţa diplomatică : 1918–1940. Vol. 1, pp. 5–29.
- Baron Georges de Serdici, baron, Papers, 1947-1990 Folder 6 1950 -Correspondence with Raoul Bossy – Hoover Institution Archives Stanford University
- Assembly of Captive European Nations records, 1953–1972, Immigration History Research Center Archives – University of Minnesota Libraries – Box 41, Folder 10, 'Raoul Bossy, 1954-1963'
- Istoria Transilvaniei vol. II. Ed. George Bariţiu, Cluj, 1997
