= Third Groza cabinet =

Romanian government cabinet

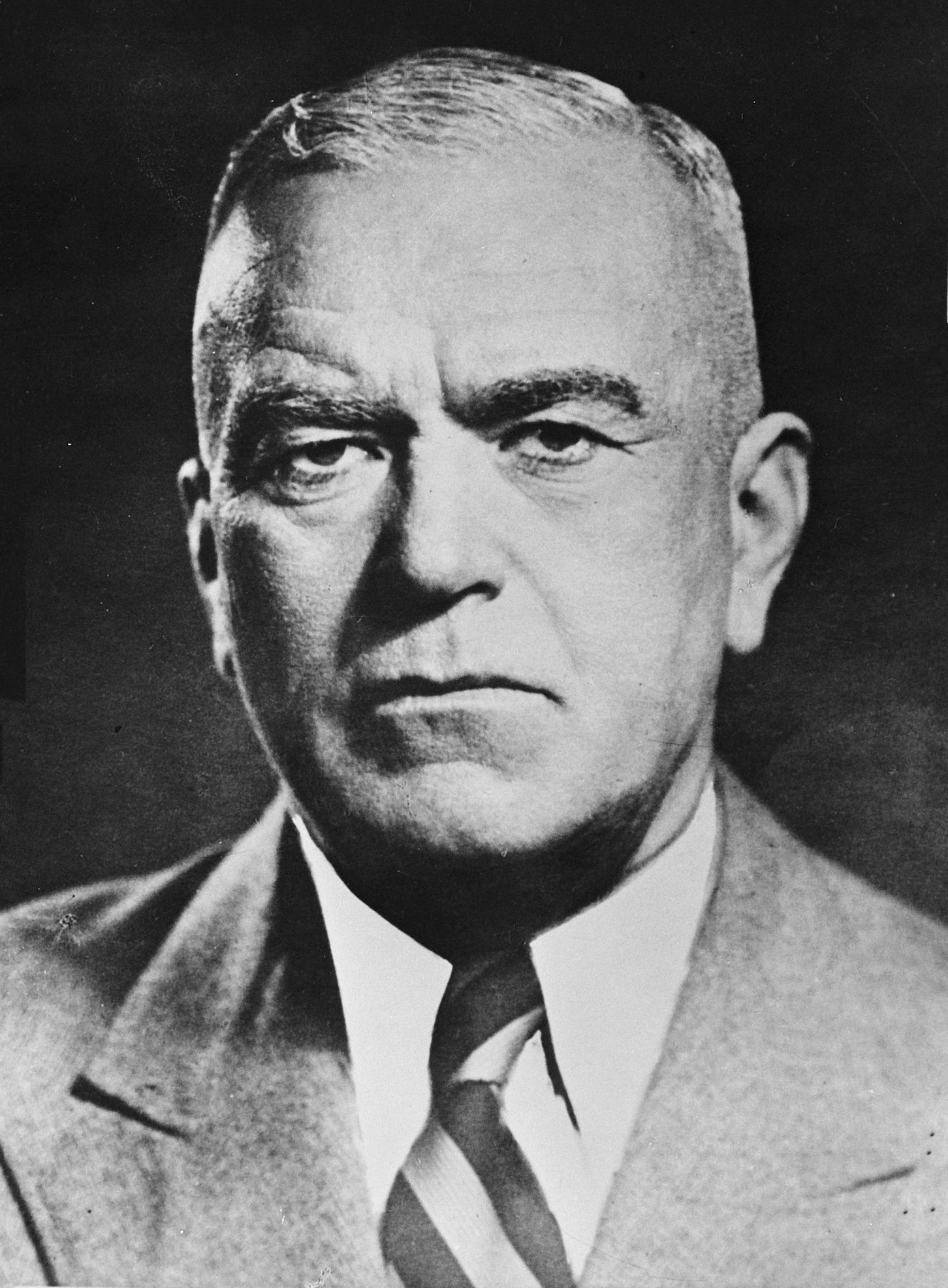
Petru Groza

The third Groza cabinet was the government of Romania from 30 December 1947 to 14 April 1948. This was the first government of the Socialist Republic of Romania.

== Composition ==
The ministers of the cabinet were as follows:

- President of the Council of Ministers:

- Petru Groza (30 December 1947 – 14 April 1948)

- Minister of the Interior:

- Teohari Georgescu (30 December 1947 – 14 April 1948)

- Minister of Foreign Affairs:

- Ana Pauker (30 December 1947 – 14 April 1948)

- Minister of Justice:

- Lucrețiu Pătrășcanu (30 December 1947 – 23 February 1948)
- Avram Bunaciu (25 February 1947 – 14 April 1948)

- Minister of National Defence:

- Emil Bodnăraș (30 December 1947 – 14 April 1948)

- Minister of Finance:

- Vasile Luca (30 December 1947 – 14 April 1948)

- Minister of Agriculture and Property:

- Traian Săvulescu (30 December 1947 – 14 April 1948)

- Minister of Industry and Commerce:

- Gheorghe Gheorghiu-Dej (30 December 1947 – 14 April 1948)

- Minister of Mines and Petroleum:

- Theodor D. Ionescu (30 December 1947 – 14 April 1948)

- Minister of Communications:

- Nicolae Profiri (30 December 1947 – 14 April 1948)

- Minister of Public Works:

- Theodor Iordăchescu (30 December 1947 – 14 April 1948)

- Minister of Cooperation:

- Romulus Zăroni (30 December 1947 – 14 April 1948)

- Minister of Labour and Social Insurance:

- Lothar Rădăceanu (30 December 1947 – 14 April 1948)

- Minister of Health:

- Florica Bagdasar (30 December 1947 – 14 April 1948)

- Minister of National Education:

- (interim) Lothar Rădăceanu (30 December 1947 – 14 April 1948)

- Minister of Information:

- Octav Livezeanu (30 December 1947 – 14 April 1948)

- Minister of Religious Affairs:

- Stanciu Stoian (30 December 1947 – 14 April 1948)

- Minister of the Arts:

- Ion Pas (30 December 1947 – 14 April 1948)

Preceded by Second Groza cabinet	Cabinet of Romania; 30 December 1947 - 14 April 1948	Succeeded by Fourth Groza cabinet
