= Fourth Groza cabinet =

Government of Romania (1948–1952)

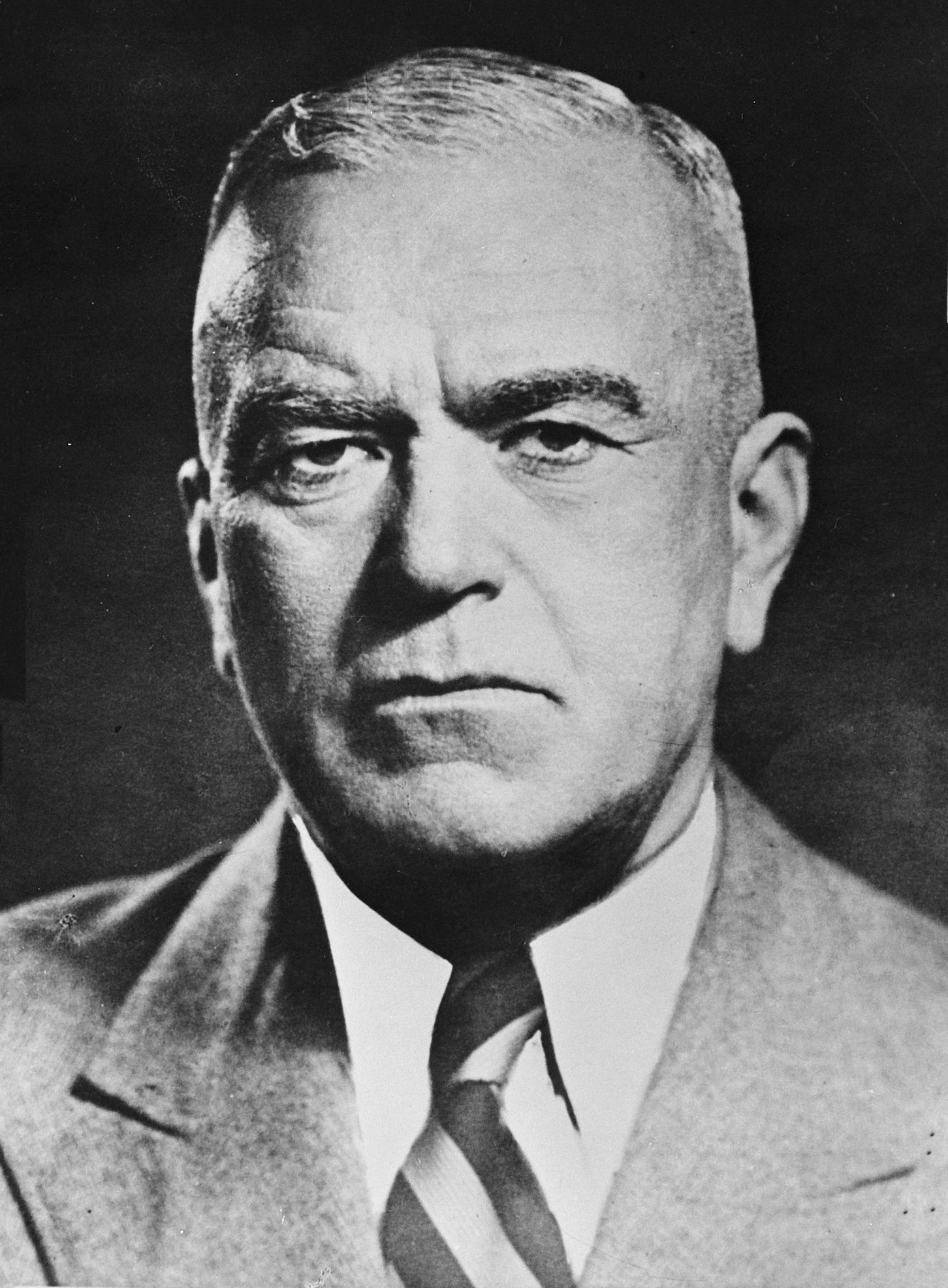
Petru Groza

The fourth Groza cabinet was the government of Romania from 15 April 1948 to 2 June 1952.

== Composition ==
The ministers of the cabinet were as follows:

- President of the Council of Ministers:

- Petru Groza (15 April 1948 – 2 June 1952)

- First Vice President of the Council of Ministers, President of the High Economic Council, Chairman of the Economic Recovery and Monetary Stabilisation Commission, Coordinator of the Ministries of Economy and Finance:

- Gheorghe Gheorghiu-Dej (15 April 1948 – 2 June 1952)

- Second Vice President of the Council of Ministers, Coordinator of the Ministries of Agriculture and Forestry:

- Traian Săvulescu (15 April 1948 – 16 April 1949)

- Third Vice President of the Council of Ministers, Coordinator of the Social and Cultural Ministries:

- Ștefan Voitec (15 April 1948 – 16 April 1949)

- Vice Presidents of the Council of Ministers:

- Ana Pauker (16 April 1949 – 2 June 1952)
- Chivu Stoica (17 March 1950 – 2 June 1952)
- Iosif Chișinevschi (17 March 1950 – 2 June 1952)
- Teohari Georgescu (17 March 1950 – 28 May 1952)
- Vasile Luca (17 March 1950 – 28 May 1952)
- Gheorghe Apostol (28 May – 2 June 1952)

- Minister of the Interior:

- Teohari Georgescu (15 April 1948 – 28 May 1952)
- Alexandru Drăghici (28 May – 2 June 1952)

- Minister of Foreign Affairs:

- Ana Pauker (15 April 1948 – 2 June 1952)

- Minister of Justice:

- Avram Bunaciu (15 April 1948 – 24 September 1949)
- Stelian Nițulescu (24 September 1949 – 2 June 1952)

- Minister of National Defence:

- Emil Bodnăraș (15 April 1948 – 2 June 1952)

- Minister of Finance:

- Vasile Luca (15 April 1948 – 9 March 1952)
- Dumitru Petrescu (9 March – 2 June 1952)

- Minister of Industry:

- Chivu Stoica (15 April 1948 – 23 November 1949)

- Minister of the Metallurgy and Chemical Industries:

- Chivu Stoica (23 November 1949 – 31 May 1952)
- Carol Loncear (31 May – 2 June 1952)

- Minister of Mines and Petroleum:

- Miron Constantinescu (15 April 1948 – 23 April 1949)
- Gheorghe Vasilichi (23 April 1949 – 5 August 1950)
- Constantin Mateescu (5 August 1950 – 2 June 1952)

- Minister of Electricity:

- Gheorghe Gaston Marin (9 August 1949 – 2 June 1952)

- Minister of Light Industry:

- Alexandru Sencovici (8 December 1949 – 8 December 1950)
- Ion Drănceanu (8 December 1950 – 2 June 1952)

- Minister of Agriculture:

- Vasile Vaida (15 April 1948 – 31 May 1952)
- Constantin Prisnea (31 May – 2 June 1952)

- Minister of Forestry and Wood Industry:

- Ion Vincze (15 April 1948 – 23 November 1949)
- Constantin Prisnea (23 November 1949 – 31 May 1952)
- Mihai Suder (31 May – 2 June 1952)

- Minister of Trade and Food:

- Bucur Șchiopu (15 April 1948 – 23 November 1949)
- Ion Vincze (23 November 1949 – 19 December 1950)
- Dumitru Diaconescu (19 December 1950 – 2 June 1952)

- Minister of Internal Trade:

- Vasile Malinschi (23 November 1949 – 31 May 1952)

- Minister of Communications:

- Nicolae Profiri (15 April 1948 – 6 April 1951)

- Minister of Transportation:

- Augustin Alexa (6 April 1951 – 2 June 1952)

- Minister of Post and Telecommunications:

- Valter Roman (6 April 1951 – 2 June 1952)

- Minister of Public Works:

- Theodor Iordăchescu (15 April 1948 – 24 September 1949)
- Leontin Sălăjan (24 September 1949 – 17 March 1950)

- Minister of Labour and Social Provisions:

- Lothar Rădăceanu (15 April 1948 – 2 June 1952)

- Minister of Health:

- Florica Bagdasar (15 April 1948 – 21 January 1951)
- Vasile Mârza (21 January 1951 – 2 June 1952)

- Minister of Public Education:

- Gheorghe Vasilichi (15 April 1948 – 23 April 1949)
- Nicolae Popescu-Doreanu (23 April 1949 – 2 June 1952)

- Minister of the Arts and Information:

- Octav Livezeanu (15 April 1948 – 23 May 1949)
- Eduard Mezincescu (23 May 1949 – 12 July 1950)

- Minister of Religious Affairs:

- Stanciu Stoian (15 April 1948 – 23 April 1951)
- Vasile Pogăceanu (23 April 1951 – 2 June 1952)

=== Minister secretaries of state ===
- Chairman of the Committee for the Organization of Consumption Cooperatives (With Ministerial rank):

- Ștefan Voitec (16 April 1949 – 2 June 1952)

- Chairman of the State Control Commission (With Ministerial rank):

- Avram Bunaciu (24 September 1949 – 5 October 1950)
- Ion Vidrașcu (5 October 1950 – 2 June 1952)

- Chairman of the Art Committee:

- Eduard Mezincescu (12 July 1950 – 2 June 1952)

- Chairman of the Committee for the Collectivisation of Agricultural Products (With Ministerial rank):

- Alexandru Moghioroș (14 – 21 January 1951)

- Chairman of the State Supply Committee (With Ministerial rank):

- Dumitru Petrescu (14 January 1951 – 9 March 1952)
- Emil Stanciu (9 March – 2 June 1952)

Preceded by Third Groza cabinet	Cabinet of Romania; 15 April 1948 - 2 June 1952	Succeeded by First Gheorghiu-Dej cabinet
