= First Groza cabinet =

Government of Romania from 6 March 1945 to 30 November 1946

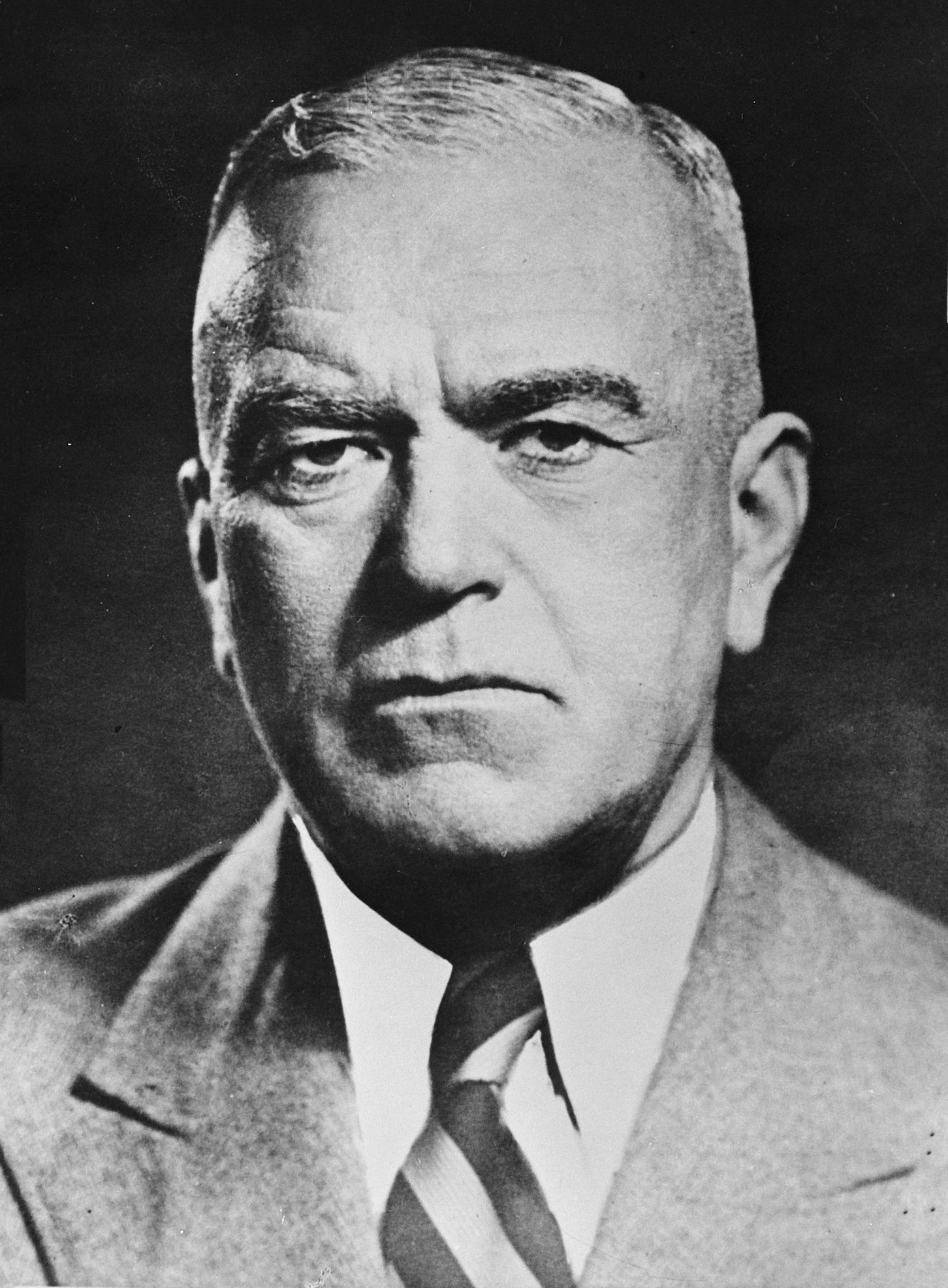
Petru Groza

The first Groza cabinet was the government of Romania from 6 March 1945 to 30 November 1946. It was Romania's first Communist-led government. World War II ended during this government.

== Composition ==
The ministers of the cabinet were as follows:

- President of the Council of Ministers:

- Petru Groza (6 March 1945 – 30 November 1946)

- Vice President of the Council of Ministers and Minister of Foreign Affairs:

- Gheorghe Tătărăscu (6 March 1945 – 30 November 1946)

- Minister of the Interior:

- Teohari Georgescu (6 March 1945 – 30 November 1946)

- Minister of Justice:

- Lucrețiu Pătrășcanu (6 March 1945 – 30 November 1946)

- Minister of War:

- Gen. Constantin Vasiliu-Rășcanu (6 March 1945 – 30 November 1946)

- Minister of Finance:

- Dumitru Alimănișteanu (6 March – 11 April 1945)
- Mircea Duma (11 April – 23 August 1945)
- Alexandru Alexandrini (23 August 1945 – 30 November 1946)

- Minister of Agriculture and Property:

- Romulus Zăroni (6 March 1945 – 30 November 1946)

- Minister of Industry and Commerce:

- Petre Bejan (6 March 1945 – 30 November 1946)

- Minister of Mines and Petroleum:

- Theodor D. Ionescu (6 March 1945 – 30 November 1946)

- Minister of Communications and Public Works:

- Gheorghe Gheorghiu-Dej (6 March 1945 – 30 November 1946)

- Minister of Cooperation:

- Anton Alexandrescu (6 March 1945 – 30 November 1946)

- Minister of Labour:

- Lothar Rădăceanu (6 March 1945 – 30 November 1946)

- Minister of Social Assistance and Insurance:

- Gheorghe Nicolau (6 March 1945 – 30 November 1946)

- Minister of Health:

- Dumitru Bagdasar (6 March 1945 – 24 April 1946)
- (interim) Petre Constantinescu-Iași (24 April – 30 November 1946)

- Minister of National Education:

- Ștefan Voitec (6 March 1945 – 30 November 1946)

- Minister of Propaganda:

- Petre Constantinescu-Iași (6 March 1945 – 30 November 1946)

- Minister of Religious Affairs:

- Constantin Burducea (6 March 1945 – 30 November 1946)

- Minister of the Arts:

- Mihail Ralea (6 March 1945 – 19 August 1946)
- Octav Livezeanu (19 August – 30 November 1946)

- Minister Secretaries of State:

- Emil Hațieganu (7 January – 30 November 1946)
- Mihail Romniceanu (7 January – 30 November 1946)

Preceded by Rădescu cabinet	Cabinet of Romania; 6 March 1945 - 30 November 1946	Succeeded by Second Groza cabinet
