= Second Groza cabinet =

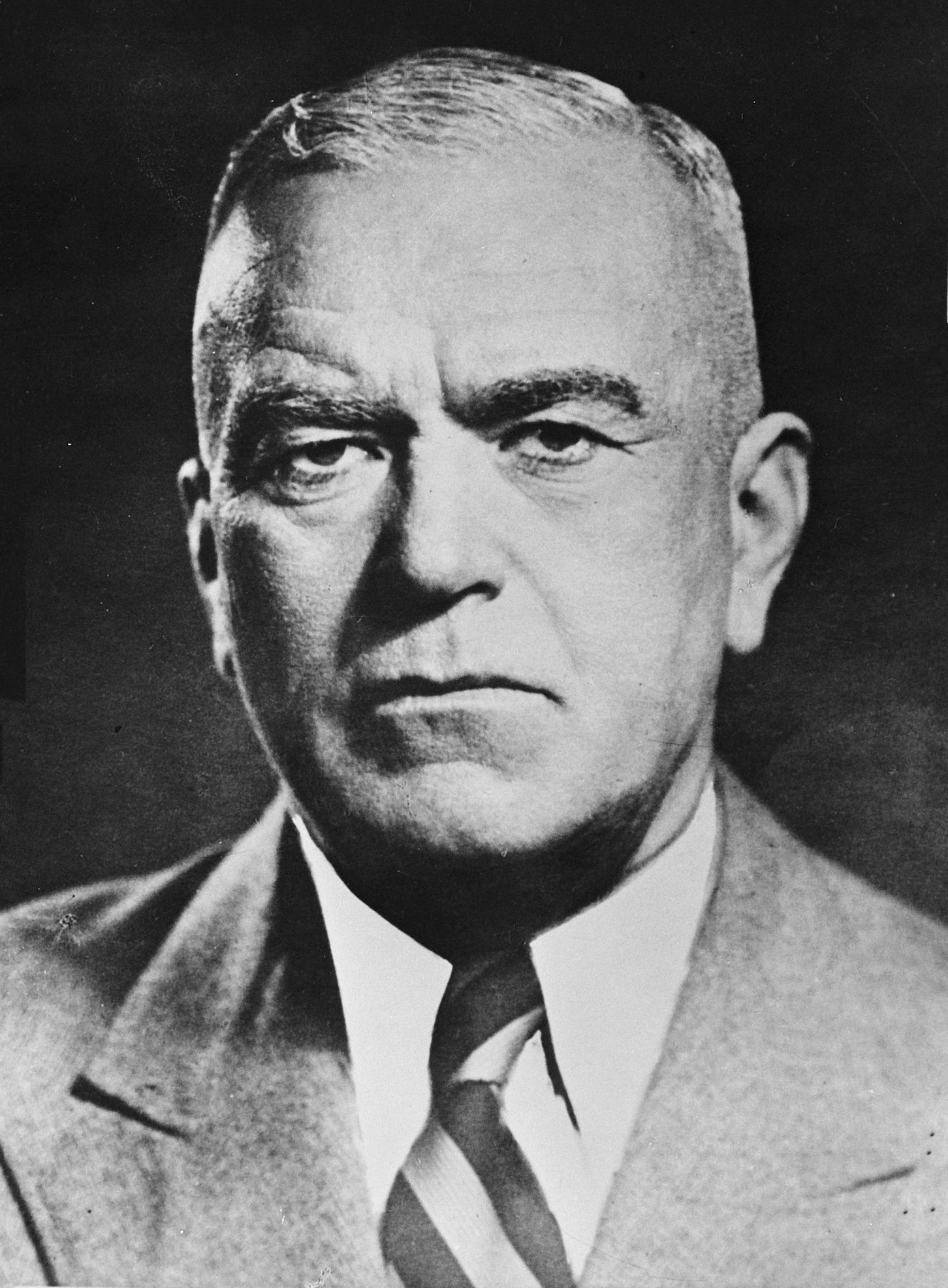
Petru Groza

The second Groza cabinet was the government of Romania from 1 December 1946 to 30 December 1947. This was the last government of the Kingdom of Romania.

== Composition ==
The ministers of the cabinet were as follows:

- President of the Council of Ministers:

- Petru Groza (1 December 1946 – 29 December 1947)

- Vice President of the Council of Ministers:

- Gheorghe Tătărăscu (1 December 1946 – 5 November 1947)

- Minister of the Interior:

- Teohari Georgescu (1 December 1946 – 29 December 1947)

- Minister of Foreign Affairs:

- Gheorghe Tătărăscu (1 December 1946 – 5 November 1947)
- Ana Pauker (5 November – 29 December 1947)

- Minister of Justice:

- Lucrețiu Pătrășcanu (1 December 1946 – 29 December 1947)

- Minister of War:

- Gen. Mihail Lascăr (1 December 1946 – 5 November 1947)
- Emil Bodnăraș (5 November – 29 December 1947)

- Minister of Finance:

- Alexandru Alexandrini (1 December 1946 – 5 November 1947)
- Vasile Luca (5 November – 29 December 1947)

- Minister of Agriculture and Property:

- Traian Săvulescu (1 December 1946 – 29 December 1947)

- Minister of National Economy:

- Gheorghe Gheorghiu-Dej (1 December 1946 – 29 December 1947)

- Minister of Mines and Petroleum:

- Theodor D. Ionescu (1 December 1946 – 29 December 1947)

- Minister of Communications:

- Nicolae Profiri (1 December 1946 – 29 December 1947)

- Minister of Public Works:

- Ion Gh. Vântu (1 December 1946 – 5 November 1947)
- Theodor Iordăchescu (5 November – 29 December 1947)

- Minister of Cooperation:

- Romulus Zăroni (1 December 1946 – 29 December 1947)

- Minister of Labour and Social Insurance:

- Lothar Rădăceanu (1 December 1946 – 29 December 1947)

- Minister of Health:

- Florica Bagdasar (1 December 1946 – 29 December 1947)

- Minister of National Education:

- Ștefan Voitec (1 December 1946 – 29 December 1947)

- Minister of Information:

- Octav Livezeanu (1 December 1946 – 29 December 1947)

- Minister of Religious Affairs:

- Radu Roșculeț (1 December 1946 – 5 November 1947)
- Stanciu Stoian (5 November – 29 December 1947)

- Minister of the Arts:

- Ion Pas (1 December 1946 – 29 December 1947)

| Preceded by First Groza cabinet | Cabinet of Romania; 1 December 1946 - 30 December 1947 | Succeeded by Third Groza cabinet |
