= Constantin Vasiliu-Rășcanu =

Romanian general and minister (1887–1980)

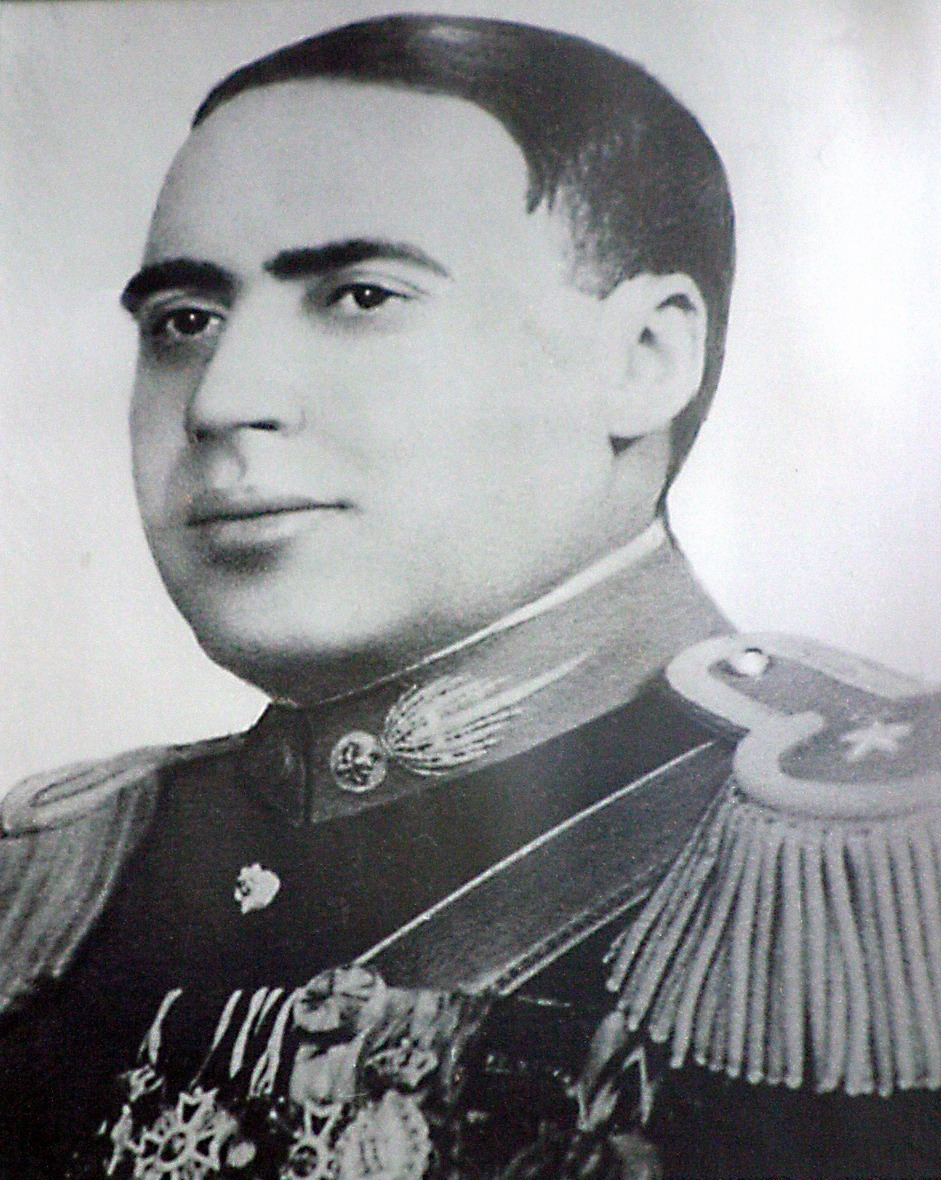

Minister of War
- In office 6 March 1945 – 29 November 1946
- Prime Minister: Petru Groza
- Preceded by: Ion Negulescu
- Succeeded by: Mihail Lascăr

Personal details
- Born: September 5, 1887 Bârlad, Kingdom of Romania
- Died: March 19, 1980 (aged 92) Bucharest, Socialist Republic of Romania
- Party: Romanian Communist Party
- Education: Higher War School

Military service
- Allegiance: Kingdom of Romania
- Rank: General
- Battles/wars: World War I World War II

Constantin Vasiliu-Rășcanu (September 5, 1887 – March 19, 1980) was a Romanian infantry general and a politician who served as Minister of War in the First cabinet of Petru Groza from March 7, 1945 to November 29, 1946.

== Biography ==
=== Early years ===
Constantin Vasiliu-Rășcanu was born on September 5, 1887 in Bârlad. He attended the Military School of Infantry and Cavalry in Bucharest (September 1, 1906 – July 1, 1908), in the same promotion as the future general Gheorghe Avramescu, being promoted after graduation to the rank of second lieutenant (July 1, 1908) and then as lieutenant on September 3, 1912.

Lieutenant Vasiliu-Rășcanu participated in the battles of World War I and commanded infantry subunits, being successively promoted to the ranks of captain (November 1, 1916) and major (September 1, 1917).

He then attended the Higher War School, graduating in 1922, and was subsequently promoted to lieutenant colonel (March 31, 1924) and colonel (April 15, 1933). He was promoted on October 25, 1939 to the rank of brigadier general and appointed commander of the 45th Infantry Brigade.

=== Second World War ===
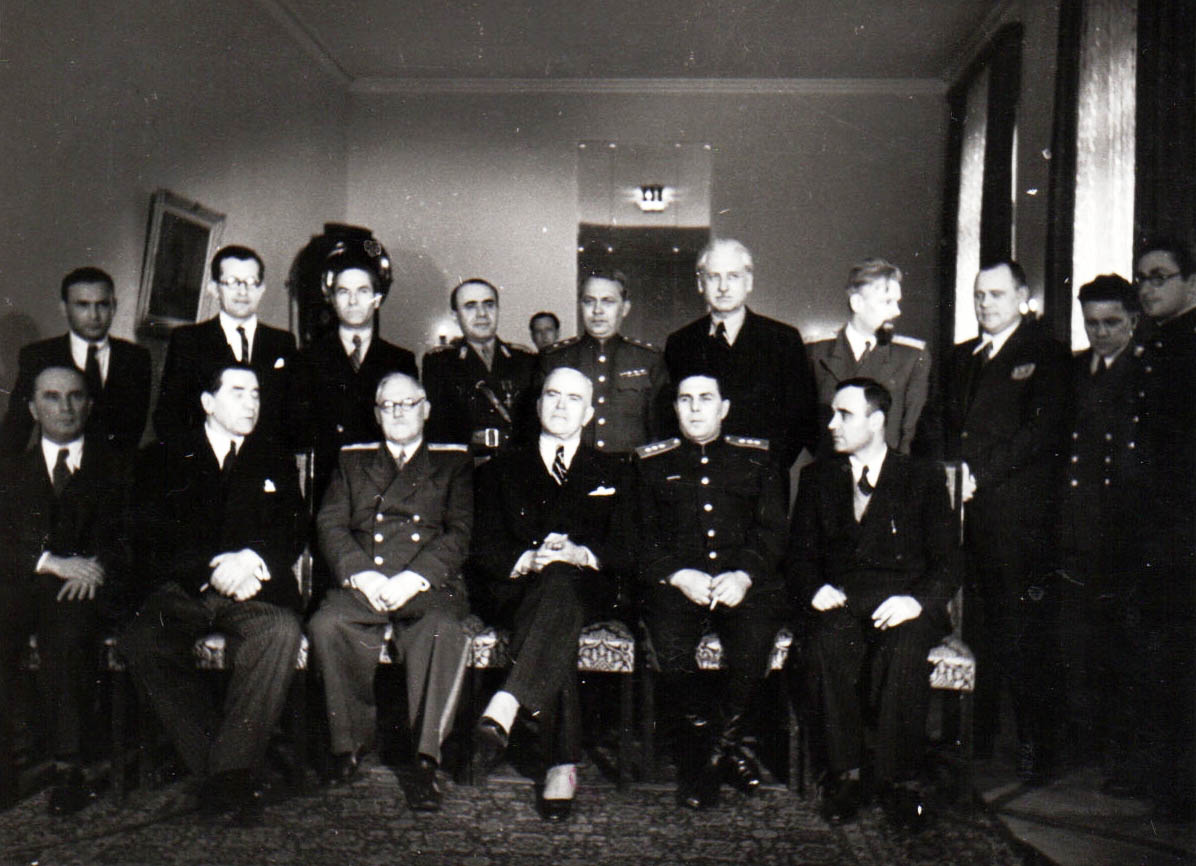
Members of the Romanian government visiting the Soviet Legation on the occasion of the reunion of Northern Transylvania with democratic Romania (March 11, 1945). Vasiliu-Rășcanu is standing, between Andrey Vyshinsky and Petru Groza.

Romania's entry into the Second World War (June 22, 1941) found him as director of the Recruitment Department. He then served as director of the Infantry Department (1941–1942), commander of the 1st Mixed Mountain Brigade (1942), commander of the 1st Mixed Mountain Division (1942–1943). In the period 1943-1944 he was in reserve, after criticizing the military policy of Marshal Ion Antonescu.

On February 16, 1944, having the rank of division general, he received the command of the 5th Territorial Corps whose mission was to defend the oil region in the Prahova Valley. He participated in several meetings with civilians and military close to the Royal House, who planned the overthrow of the Antonescian regime, Romania's exit from the anti-Soviet war, and the return of arms against Nazi Germany.

After the Coup d'état on August 23, 1944, he led the military operations of the 5th Territorial Corps, managing until August 3, 1944 to annihilate the German troops that were in the area of the city of Ploiești and in the Prahova Valley. According to an archive document, "during the battles in the Prahova Valley area, the Corps wrote the most beautiful page in its history, to liquidate in such a short time German troops in double numbers and well trained; thanks to the measures taken and the energy with which he led his troops, the installations in the oil area were saved...". In the battles fought by the 5th Territorial Corps in the Ploiesti area and in the Prahova Valley, 1,500 German soldiers died, 2,300 German soldiers were wounded, 9,076 German soldiers were taken prisoner, including 147 officers and 1,131 non-commissioned officers, 1,300 were captured. of trucks, 260 guns of different calibers.

He was decorated on November 22, 1944 with the Order of Michael the Brave with swords, 3rd class in accordance with Royal decree no. 2,254 of November 22, 1944, "For the way he distinguished himself in the difficult but successful actions of August 24–31, 1944, undertaken in the Ploiești region, for the liberation of the territory. Continuously in the field, in the midst of the troops encouraging them, he proved, in addition to his capacity, a personal courage and a firmness of character worthy of all praise".

=== Minister of War ===
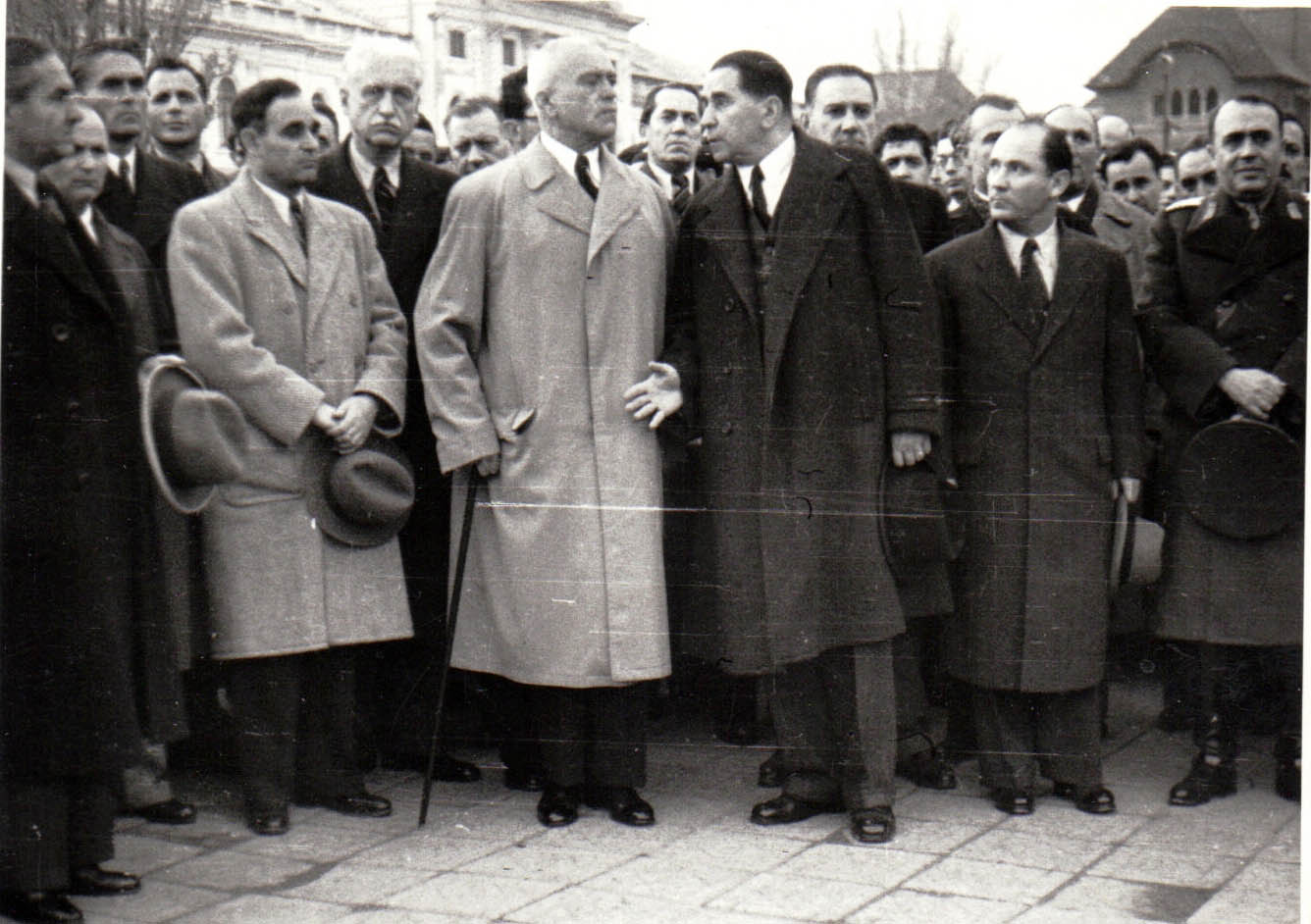
Vasiliu-Rășcanu (last one on the right) together with Gheorghe Gheorghiu Dej, Petru Groza and other members of the government at a demonstration in memory of the victims of the clashes between the communists and the representatives of the historical parties (November 12, 1945)

Later, Vasiliu-Rășcanu held high-ranking positions in the Romanian Army. He was appointed on 7 March 1945 as Minister of War in the first government of Petru Groza, holding this position until 29 November 1946.

On July 6, 1945, considering that "doing the just policy of the democratic regime in which we live is one of the leading duties of every soldier", the Higher Directorate for Education, Culture and Propaganda asked the Ministry of War to repeal the articles of law that prohibited the military from politics. While the request was officially rejected, it did not prevent Minister Vasiliu-Rășcanu from facilitating communist propaganda in the army, declaring that "The army must do politics".

After the pro-Soviet government led by Groza came to power, General Constantin Vasiliu-Rășcanu ordered the reorganization of the Romanian Army, taking over the organization system of the Red Army. On May 28, 1945, the new Minister of War signed order no. 49151 ordering all military commanders to participate in the identification of military personnel who have committed war crimes and to make them available to the People's Tribunals. In the fall of 1945, he was one of the 15 soldiers who asked to be accepted into the ranks of the Romanian Communist Party (PCR), their request for membership being accepted by the Politburo of the Central Committee of the PCR. Between March 22 and June 5, 1947 Vasiliu-Rășcanu led the Fourth Army.

Constantin Vasiliu Rășcanu was married to a relative of Ana Pauker, who had a file regarding illicit currency speculation. He was promoted to the rank of General of the Army on 24 January 1948 and placed in the reserve.
