= Maria Groza =

Romanian economist and feminist

Maria-Mia Groza (1918–2003), also known as Maria Groza or Mia Groza, was a Romanian economist, feminist and politician.

== Life ==
Maria Groza was born on 1 September 1918, in Déva, Austria-Hungary (now Deva, Romania). She was the daughter of Petru Groza, prime minister of Romania from 1945 to 1952. She was educated at a commercial school in Sibiu and the Bucharest Academy of Economic Studies.

For several years she worked as personal secretary and English interpreter for her father, accompanying him on official visits abroad.

From 1958 to 1964 Groza was Secretary of the National Council of Women, and from 1965 to 1975 she was the council's vice-president. Between 1978 and 1987 she was Romania's Vice Minister for Foreign Affairs. She also served as Vice Minister of Defence, and Romanian delegate to the UN General Assembly.

She died in 2003, aged 85. She is buried in Băcia, next to her parents.

== Works ==
- Women in the contemporary life of Romania. Meridiane Publishing House, 1970.
