= Lothar Rădăceanu =

Romanian journalist, linguist, and politician (1899–1955)

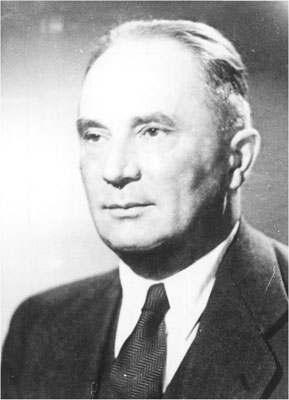

Minister of Labour
- In office 4 November 1944 – 30 November 1946
- Prime Minister: Constantin Sănătescu; Nicolae Rădescu; Petru Groza
- Preceded by: Nicolae Marinescu

Minister of Labour and Social Insurance
- In office 1 December 1946 – 2 June 1952
- Prime Minister: Petru Groza

Minister of Social Provisions
- In office 2 June 1952 – 28 July 1952
- Prime Minister: Gheorghe Gheorghiu-Dej
- Succeeded by: Pericle Negescu

Minister of National Education
- In office 30 December 1947 – 14 April 1948
- Prime Minister: Petru Groza
- Preceded by: Ștefan Voitec
- Succeeded by: Gheorghe Vasilichi

Personal details
- Born: Lothar Würzer; May 19, 1899 Rădăuți, Bukovina, Austria-Hungary
- Died: August 24, 1955 (aged 56) Helsinki, Finland
- Party: Romanian Social Democratic Party; Romanian Workers' Party
- Spouse: Eugenia Rădăceanu
- Occupation: Journalist, linguist, politician

Lothar or Lotar Rădăceanu (born Lothar Würzer or Würzel; May 19, 1899 – August 24, 1955) was a Romanian journalist and linguist, best known as a socialist and communist politician.

== Biography ==
=== Early life and politics ===
Born to an ethnic German family in Rădăuți, Bukovina (part of Austria-Hungary at the time), he trained in German studies and eventually became a professor at the University of Bucharest.

From early on, Rădăceanu was a member of the Romanian Social Democratic Party (PSDR), one of its main ideologists and representatives in the Chamber of Deputies, as well as a regular contributor to the socialist journals Libertatea and Lumea Nouă.

In the early 1930s, he shared his party's concerns regarding the predominant agricultural character of Romanian economy. He contributed to the Poporanist paper Viața Românească an article which stated that:

Working in community and cooperative farming are the conditions for survival in peasant-based agriculture.
The Social-Democratic Party [...] commits itself to carrying out a campaign of enlightenment in this direction and appeals to all enlightened peasants and all village intellectuals for help in this respect.

He supported his party's alliance with the National Peasantists (PNȚ) during the late 1920s, and their collaboration in the 1928 election, but later criticized the PNȚ government for "proceeding with too little energy with the abolition of reactionary institutions". Like his fellow PSDR member Șerban Voinea, Rădăceanu advocated the thesis of Constantin Dobrogeanu-Gherea regarding the special conditions for socialism inside the Romanian economical framework; he accepted the views on Romanian economic history as formulated by Ștefan Zeletin, an advocate of economic liberalism, but disagreed with his conclusions regarding the fundamental role of the bourgeoisie.

In late January 1933, the pro-democracy Rădăceanu had criticized the steps taken by King Carol II to institute a more authoritarian regime after the fall of Iuliu Maniu's PNȚ cabinet. Alluding to the event which had been used by Carol — the disagreement between Gavrilă Marinescu, the police prefect of Bucharest and a favourite of the king, and Ion Mihalache, the Minister of the Interior —, he stressed that:

[The Maniu cabinet] was toppled by a police prefect, whom it could not remove from his office. It is not therefore the government who had the power to nominate and recall state officials, but an occult and irresponsible power, of which the Constitution makes no mention.

Equally opposed to Bolshevism, he wrote several analytical articles which criticized Stalinism and the Soviet Union. In 1935, he expressed his views on the risks of the Popular Front tactic as proposed by the Soviets:

The will communism has to collaborate cannot be sincere, as long as — instead of collaborating with the Russian Social-Democrats — they torture them in prisons.

However, he was staunchly opposed to the authorities' crackdown on the outlawed Romanian Communist Party (PCR), and wrote pieces in defence of communist activists prosecuted for their activities. In 1936, when Ana Pauker and other PCR members were being tried, he argued in favour of:

the right [of legal existence] for the communist party as well, [while we are] raising our most energetic protest against the persecution to which this party is being submitted in the country where Goga–Cuzism [that is, the fascist National Christian Party] and Codrenism [that is, the fascist Iron Guard] enjoy all liberties.

=== Communism ===
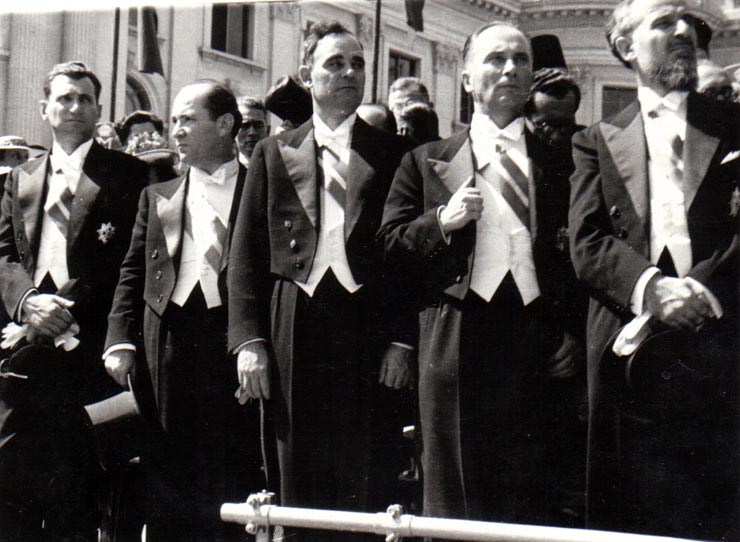
A moment during the first-ever August 23 Parade on Palace Square in 1945. Pictured are five ministers of the cabinet of Petru Groza (left to right): Lucrețiu Pătrășcanu, Teohari Georgescu, Gheorghe Gheorghiu-Dej, Rădăceanu, and Ștefan Voitec.

After 1938, during the time when the PSDR remained active in clandestinity (being banned, together with all other political parties, by King Carol), relations between Rădăceanu and the party leader Constantin Titel Petrescu soured, and he approached the Comintern-backed alliance created by minor parties around the PCR. In 1943, during Ion Antonescu's dictatorship (see Romania during World War II), he was, with Mihai Ralea, founder and leader of the Socialist Peasants' Party; Rădăceanu soon after returned to his original party, with journalist Victor Frunză claiming he infiltrated as a secret PCR affiliate. His political adversaries alleged that, during the period, he was also benefiting from good relations with Nazi German officials present in Romania.

In 1944, the August 23 royal coup overthrew Antonescu, taking Romania out of its alliance with the Axis powers and into the Allied bloc and leading to the reestablishment of pluralism in political life. On November 4 of that year, Rădăceanu joined the Petru Groza cabinet, supported by the PCR, as Minister of Labor.

Romania under Soviet occupation witnessed a growth in influence for the PCR, which sought to impose its domination on the left-wing portion of the political spectrum. Rădăceanu and Ștefan Voitec stood out inside the PSDR as advocates of close collaboration with the communists: in March 1946, a conflict erupted between those two and Titel Petrescu, splitting the party into respective wings. After several clashes inside the party, Titel Petrescu left to form an Independent Social Democratic Party, while Rădăceanu and Voitec became leaders of a PSDR that had grown to 753,000 members by July 1947. The party, which remained in the National Democratic Front created around the PCR, ran on a single platform with the latter in the November 1946 general election (carried by the bloc through widespread electoral fraud). During a campaign stop at the Grivița Railway Yards, Rădăceanu had a confrontation with the PCR leader, Gheorghe Gheorghiu-Dej, regarding who is blocking the merger of the PSDR with the PCR. After the election, Rădăceanu stayed on as Minister of Labor in the second Groza government.

=== Romanian Workers' Party ===
In November of the following year, the PCR and PDSR merged to form the Romanian Workers' Party (PMR)—a name it would retain until reverting to the PCR name in 1965. A month later, the PMR forced King Michael I to abdicate, marking the founding of the Romanian People's Republic. Rădăceanu served as a secretary of the merged party's Central Committee and a member of the Politburo until his death. In 1946–1947, Rădăceanu was among the delegates to the Paris Peace Conference (a group led by Gheorghe Tătărescu). He was admitted to the Romanian Academy in 1955.

Throughout his later years, he maintained the prospective of a left-wing social democrat within the PMR. He wrote articles for the Cominform magazine For Lasting Peace, for People's Democracy! which advised Eastern Bloc social democratic parties (which maintained a decorative existence in some Eastern Bloc countries in order to keep up the appearance of pluralism) to be leery of right-wing deviationism. He died in Helsinki, while attending an international peace congress.

His wife Eugenia was actively promoted to party offices under Nicolae Ceaușescu, benefiting from the support of Elena Ceaușescu (as part of a campaign of introducing women activists in the higher echelon).
