= Anna Pauker Battery – Franco-Belgian Group =

- Active: December 1936 – November 1938
- Country: France; Belgium; Romania
- Allegiance: Second Spanish Republic
- Branch: International Brigades
- Type: Artillery
- Role: Heavy artillery support
- Part of: XI International Brigade
- Patron: Ana Pauker
- Engagements: Spanish Civil War

Commanders
- Notable commanders: Gaston Carré; Nicolae Cristea; Valter Roman

The Anna Pauker Battery – Franco-Belgian Group was a multi-national artillery unit of the International Brigades, which operated during the Spanish Civil War (1936–1939). It was named in honor of Romanian communist activist Ana Pauker. Originally it was composed mainly of French volunteers, however Romanians gradually came to constitute a major part of the unit.

== Background ==
During the Spanish Civil War, tens of thousands of foreign volunteers were mobilized by the Communist International (Comintern) to support the Popular Front and the Second Spanish Republic against the nationalist forces led by Francisco Franco. These volunteers were organized into the International Brigades, which included several heavy artillery units, such as the Franco-Belgian “Anna Pauker” Battery. The unit was part of the XI Brigade.

== Notable members ==
- Valter Roman, political commissar of the battery in 1937.
- Gaston Carré, commander of the battery as of February 1937.
- Nicolae Cristea, Romanian communist volunteer and former leader of the unit before returning to France in 1939.
- Victor Morin, political commissar of the battery in 1938.
- Abel Benoiton, artillery observer, who returned to France in November 1938.

== Military activity ==
The battery was active on several fronts within the Republican-held zones, providing artillery support to infantry units. It was withdrawn in 1938 as part of the broader process of repatriating international volunteers.
