= Băcia =

- Commune
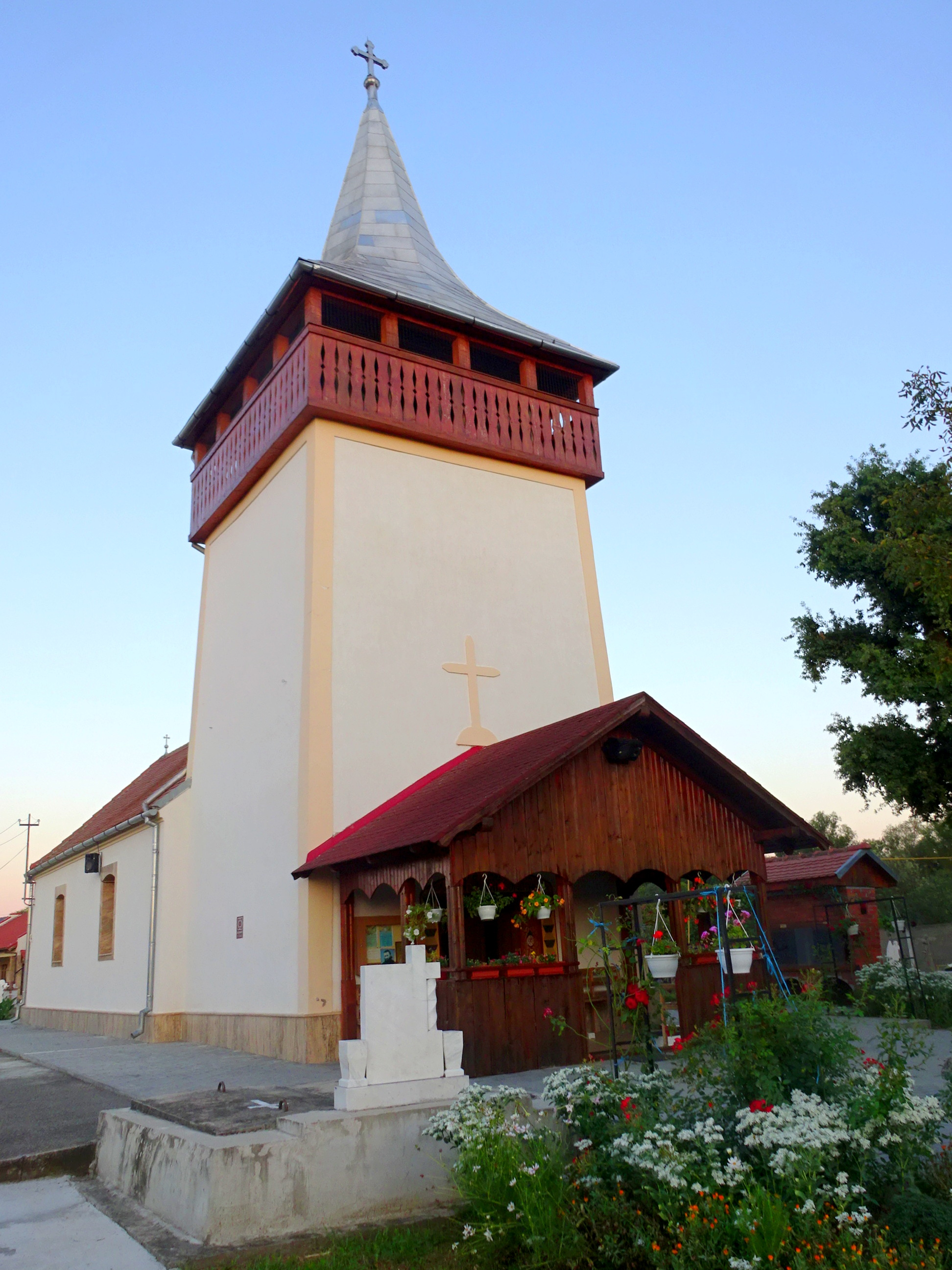
- Saint George's Church in Băcia

- Coat of arms

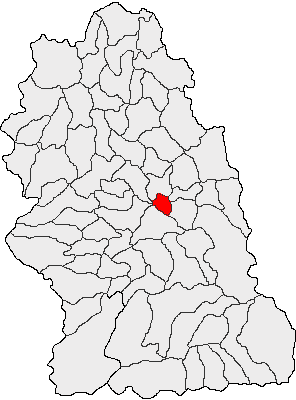
- Location in Hunedoara County

- Location in Romania
- Coordinates: 45°48′N 23°1′E
- Country: Romania
- County: Hunedoara

Government
  - Mayor (2020–2024): Florin Alba (PSD)
- Area: 29.73 km^{2} (11.48 sq mi)
- Elevation: 225 m (738 ft)
- Population (2021-12-01): 1,734
  - Density: 58.32/km^{2} (151.1/sq mi)
- Time zone: UTC+02:00 (EET)
  - Summer (DST): UTC+03:00 (EEST)
- Postal code: 337040
- Area code: (+40) 0254
- Vehicle reg.: HD
- Website: www.bacia.ro

Băcia (Hungarian: Bácsi, German: Schäferdorf) is a commune in Hunedoara County, Transylvania, Romania. It is composed of four villages: Băcia, Petreni (Petrény), Tâmpa (Tompa), and Totia (Nagytóti).

At the 2021 census, the commune had a population of 1,734; of those, 88.87% were Romanians and 4.04% Hungarians.

Historical population
Year	Pop.	±%
1850	1,626	—
1930	2,234	+37.4%
2002	1,797	−19.6%
2011	1,827	+1.7%
2021	1,734	−5.1%
Source: Census data

== Natives ==
- Petru Groza (1884 – 1958), politician, Prime Minister from 1945 to 1952
