= Petru Groza =

Romanian politician (1884–1958)

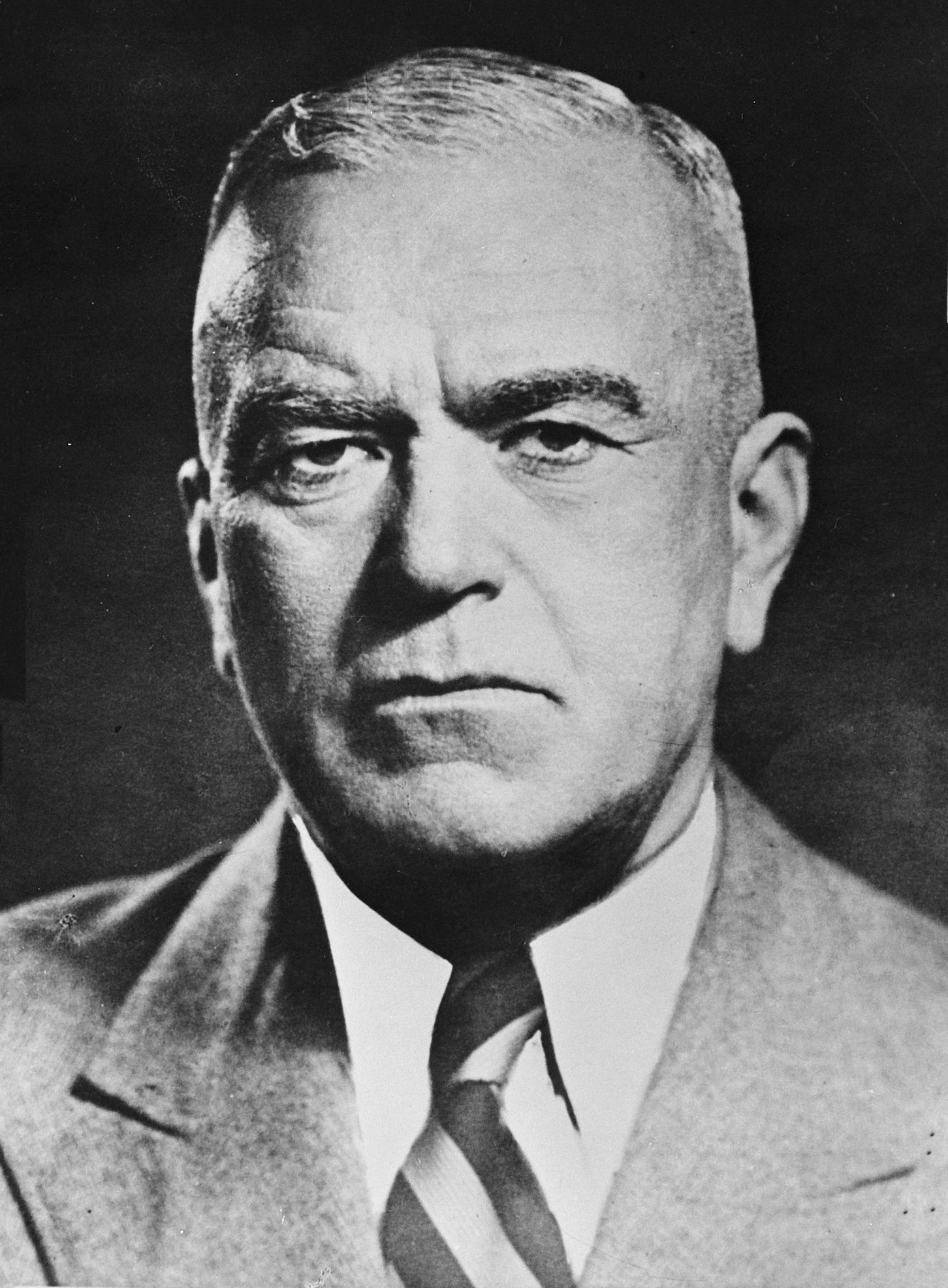

President of the Presidium of the Great National Assembly
- In office 12 June 1952 – 7 January 1958
- Preceded by: Constantin Ion Parhon
- Succeeded by: Mihail Sadoveanu and Anton Moisescu (acting); Ion Gheorghe Maurer

President of the Council of Ministers
- In office 6 March 1945 – 2 June 1952
- Monarch: Michael I (1945–1947)
- President: Constantin Ion Parhon (1947–1952)
- Deputy: Gheorghe Tătărescu (1945–1947); Gheorghe Gheorghiu-Dej (1948–1952)
- Preceded by: Nicolae Rădescu
- Succeeded by: Gheorghe Gheorghiu-Dej

Vice President of the Council of Ministers
- In office 4 November 1944 – 28 February 1945
- Monarch: Michael I
- Prime Minister: Constantin Sănătescu; Nicolae Rădescu
- Preceded by: Mihai Antonescu
- Succeeded by: Gheorghe Tătărescu

President of the Ploughmen's Front
- In office 1933–1953
- Succeeded by: Gheorghe Gheorghiu-Dej (party merged with the Romanian Workers' Party)

Minister of State
- In office 30 March 1926 – 4 June 1927
- Prime Minister: Alexandru Averescu

Minister of Public Works
- In office 30 March 1926 – 14 July 1926
- Prime Minister: Alexandru Averescu
- Preceded by: Traian Moșoiu
- Succeeded by: Constantin Meissner

Personal details
- Born: 7 December 1884 Bácsi, Hunyad County, Transleithania, Austria-Hungary (now Băcia, Romania)
- Died: 7 January 1958 (aged 73) Bucharest, Romanian People's Republic
- Party: Romanian National Party (1918–1920); People's Party (1920–1933); Ploughmen's Front (1933–1953); Independent (1953–1958)
- Education: University of Budapest; Leipzig University
- Profession: Lawyer
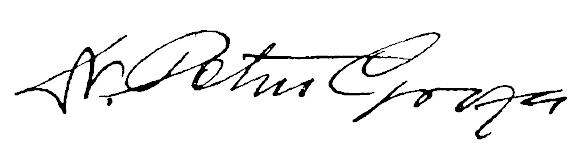
- Signature

Petru Groza (7 December 1884 – 7 January 1958) was a Romanian politician, best known as the first Prime Minister of the Communist Party-dominated government under Soviet occupation during the early stages of the Communist regime in Romania, and later as the President of the Presidium of the Great National Assembly (nominal head of state of Romania) from 1952 until his death in 1958.

Groza emerged as a public figure at the end of World War I as a notable member of the Romanian National Party (PNR), preeminent layman of the Romanian Orthodox Church, and then member of the Directory Council of Transylvania. In 1925–26 he served as Minister of State in the cabinet of Marshal Alexandru Averescu. In 1933, Groza founded a left-wing Agrarian organization known as the Ploughmen's Front (Frontul Plugarilor). The left-wing ideas he supported earned him the nickname The Red Bourgeois.

Groza became Premier in 1945 when Nicolae Rădescu, a leading Romanian Army general who assumed power briefly following the conclusion of World War II, was forced to resign by the Soviet Union's deputy People's Commissar for Foreign Affairs, Andrei Y. Vishinsky. During Groza's tenure, Romania's King, Michael I, was forced to abdicate as the nation officially became a "People's Republic". Although his authority and power as Premier was compromised by his reliance upon the Soviet Union for support, Groza presided over the onset of full-fledged Communist rule in Romania before eventually being succeeded by Gheorghe Gheorghiu-Dej in 1952 and became the President of the Presidium of the Great National Assembly until his death in 1958.

== Early life and studies (1884–1907) ==
Born as one of the three sons of a wealthy couple in Bácsi (now called Băcia), a village near Déva (today Deva) in Transylvania (part of Austria-Hungary at the time), his father Adam was a priest. Groza was afforded a variety of opportunities in his youth and early career to establish connections and a degree of notoriety, which would later prove essential in his political career. He attended primary school in his native village, then in Kastély (now Coștei) and Lugos (now Lugoj) in the Banat. In 1903, he graduated from the Hungarian Reformed high school (now the Aurel Vlaicu High School) in Szászváros (now Orăștie). That autumn, he began his law and economics training in Hungary, studying at the University of Budapest. In 1905, he took courses at the University of Berlin, heading to Leipzig University in 1906. He obtained a doctorate from the latter institution in 1907.

== Early career (1907–1928) ==
After completing his studies, Groza returned to Deva to work as a lawyer. During World War I he served as a soldier in the 8th Honvéd Regiment. In 1918, at the war's end, he emerged on the political scene as a member of the Romanian National Party (PNR) and obtained a position on the Directory Council of Transylvania, convened by ethnic Romanian politicians who had voted in favour of union with Romania; he maintained his office over the course of the following two years.

Throughout this period of his life, Groza established a variety of political connections, working in various Transylvanian political and religious organizations. From 1919 to 1927, for example, Groza obtained a position as a deputy in the Synod and Congress of the Romanian Orthodox Church. In the mid-1920s, Groza, who had left the PNR after a conflict with Iuliu Maniu and had joined the People's Party, served as the Minister for Transylvania and Minister of Public Works and Communications in the Third Averescu cabinet.

During this period in his life, Groza was able to amass a personal fortune as a wealthy landowner and establish a notable reputation as a prominent layman within the Romanian Orthodox Church, a position which would later make him invaluable to a Romanian Communist Party (PCR) that was campaigning to attract the support of Eastern Orthodox Christians who constituted the nation's most numerous religious group in 1945.

== Rise to power (1933–1945) ==
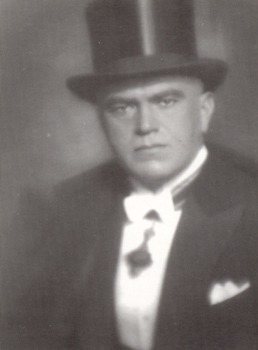
Groza in a formal attire portrait

Despite having briefly retired from public life in 1928 after holding a series of political posts, Groza reemerged on the political scene in 1933, founding a peasant-based political organization, the Ploughmen's Front. The Front was funded by Red Aid.

Although the movement originally began in order to oppose the increasing burden of debt carried by Romania's peasants during the Great Depression and because the National Peasants' Party could not help the poorest peasants, by 1944 the organization was essentially under Communist control. The Communist Party wished to seize power but was too weak to seize it alone – post-communist historiography would later claim that in 1944 it only had about a thousand members. Accordingly, the Romanian communist leaders decided to create a broad coalition of political organizations.

This coalition was composed of four major front organizations: the Romanian Society for Friendship with the Soviet Union, the Union of Patriots, the Patriotic Defense, and, by far the most widely backed by the Romanian populace, Groza's Ploughmen's Front. Being a chief political actor in the largest of the Communist front organizations, Groza was able to assert himself in a position of eminence within the Romanian political sphere as the Ploughmen's Front joined the Communist Party to create the National Democratic Front in October 1944. It also included the Social Democrats, Mihai Ralea's Socialist Peasants' Party and the Hungarian People's Union, as well as other minor groups). Groza was first considered by the Communist Lucrețiu Pătrășcanu for the post of premier in October 1944.

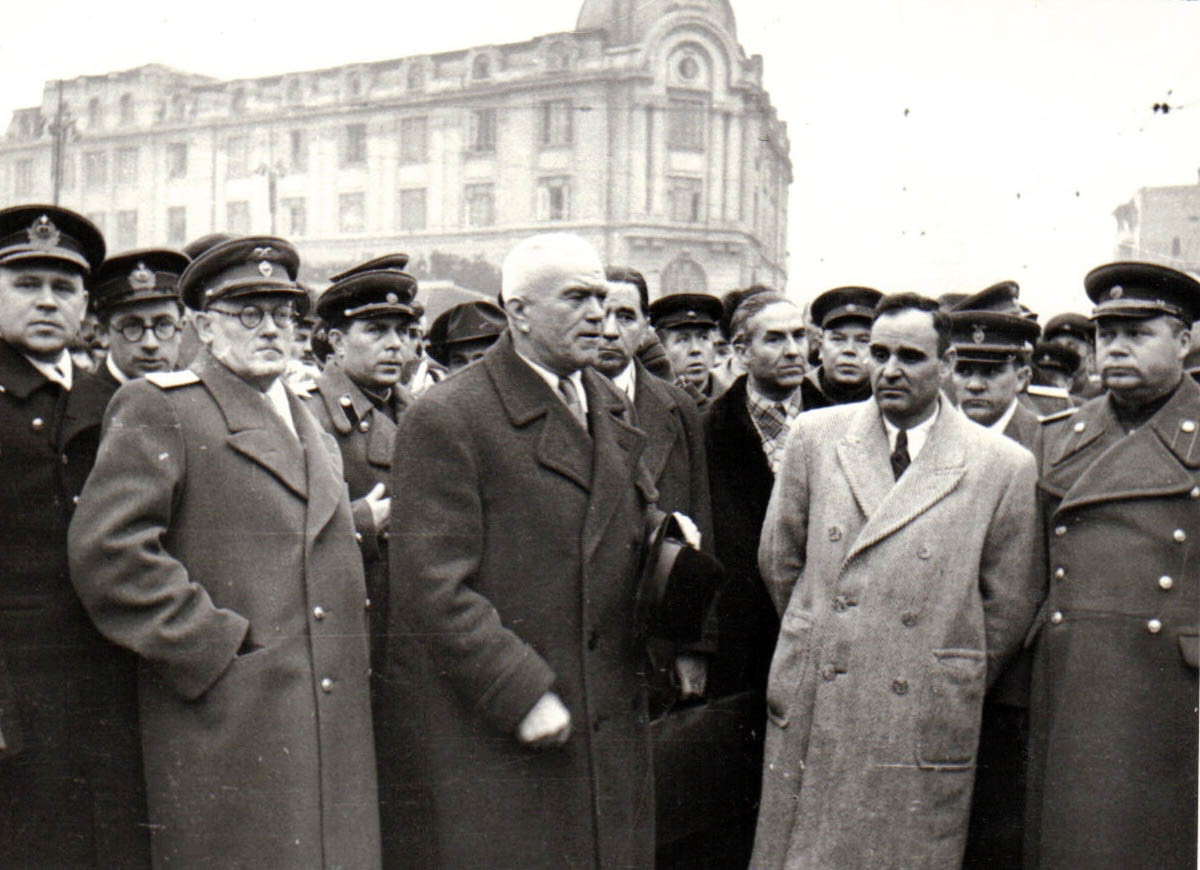
Groza with Gheorghe Gheorghiu-Dej (center), Gheorghe Tătărescu, Petre Constantinescu-Iași, Andrey Vyshinsky, and Ivan Susaikov at the Bucharest North railway station, 14 March 1945

Groza's prominent status within the National Democratic Front afforded him the opportunity to succeed General Nicolae Rădescu as premier when, in January 1945, top Romanian communist leaders, namely Ana Pauker and Gheorghe Gheorghiu-Dej, rebuked Rădescu for allegedly failing to combat "fascist sympathizers". With the help of Soviet authorities, the Communists soon mobilized workers to hold a series of demonstrations against Rădescu, and by February many had died because the demonstrations often led to violence. While the communists claimed that the Romanian Army was responsible for the deaths of innocent civilians, Rădescu weakened his own popular support by stating that the communists were "godless foreigners with no homeland". In response, Andrey Vyshinsky, the Soviet vice commissar of foreign affairs, traveled to Bucharest and allegedly gave King Michael an ultimatum—unless he sacked Rădescu and replaced him with Groza, Romania's independence would be at risk. The king had hoped that General Gheorghe Avramescu, who commanded the Romanian 4th Army in the fight to liberate Transylvania and Hungary, would be designated the next prime minister, but, while Michael was waiting on 2 March for Avramescu to return from the front to Bucharest, the NKVD arrested Avramescu in Slovakia, and he died the next day. Faced with mounting Soviet pressure, Michael complied, and Groza became prime minister on 6 March 1945.

== The Groza cabinets (1945-1952) ==
- First Groza cabinet (6 March 1945 - 30 November 1946)
- Second Groza cabinet (1 December 1946 - 30 December 1947), the last of the Kingdom of Romania
- Third Groza cabinet (30 December 1947 - 14 April 1948), the first of the Socialist Republic of Romania
- Fourth Groza cabinet (15 April 1948 - 2 June 1952)

Groza headed four cabinets between 1945 and 1952, the first two in the frame of the constitutional monarchy, and the latter two after playing a major role in forcing King Michael I to abdicate on 30 December 1947 and the ensuing declaration of the People's Republic.

=== Political crisis: Western opposition and royal strike ===
On 18 August 1945, Roy Melbourne presented to Foreign Minister Gheorghe Tătărescu a verbal note showing that the American government "wants the establishment of a representative regime made up of all democratic groups in this country". Consequently, the United States will only sign a final peace treaty with a fully recognized democratic government. Both Groza and Tătărescu rejected the note, declaring it null and void. They argued that the US could not address a government it did not recognize. British diplomats also sent such a note, but the government had the same attitude.

Faced with Groza's refusal to resign, King Michael instituted, on 21 August, the royal strike (21 August 1945 – 7 January 1946) and no longer agreed to countersign the government's documents. At the December 1945 Conference, it was decided that the situation should be resolved by appointing one PNL and PNȚ member each to the government, after which free elections would be organized and freedom of "press, speech, religion and association" would be ensured. Maniu warned that without the neutrality of the Ministries of Interior and Justice, free elections could not take place in Romania, but the decision had to be followed. On 7 January 1946, Emil Hațieganu, from PNȚ, and Mihail Romniceanu, from PNL took the oath as ministers. Basically, the decisions in Moscow represented the victory of the Soviet point of view, the government of Petru Groza being recognized by the USA and Great Britain on 5 February 1946.

During his term as premier, Groza also clashed with the nation's remaining monarchist forces under King Michael I. Although his powers were minimal within Groza's regime, King Michael symbolized the remnants of the traditional Romanian monarchy and, in late 1945, the King urged Groza to resign. The King maintained that Romania must abide by the Yalta accords, allowing the United States, the United Kingdom, and the Soviet Union to each have a hand in post-war government reconstruction and the incorporation of a broader coalition force he had already organized. Groza flatly rejected the request, and relations between the two figures remained tense over the next few years, with Groza and the King differing on the prosecution of war criminals and in the awarding of honorary Romanian citizenship to Stalin in August 1947.

=== First Groza cabinet (6 March 1945 - 30 November 1946) ===
Groza gave key portfolios such as defence, justice, and the interior to the Communists. It nominally included ministers from the National Liberals and National Peasants as well, but the ministers using those labels were fellow travellers like Groza, and had been handpicked by the Communists.

Despite the annoyance of the two powers, the Communists constituted only a minority in Groza's cabinet. The leading figures in the Romanian Communist Party, Pauker and Gheorghiu-Dej, wanted the Groza government to preserve the façade of a coalition government and thus enable the Communists to win the confidence of the masses, since right after the Second World War the communists enjoyed very little political support. For this reason top communist figures like Pauker and Gheorghiu-Dej did not join Groza's cabinet. They planned to gradually impose an out-and-out Communist regime under the veil of the existing coalition government. By conflating the successes of the regime with their party, Pauker and Gheorghiu-Dej hoped to win support for the party and lay the foundations for a one-party state. Accordingly, Groza maintained the illusion of a coalition government, appointing members of diverse political organizations to his cabinet and formulating his government's short-term goals in broad, non-ideological terms. He stated at a cabinet meeting on 7 March 1945, for example, that the government sought to guarantee safety and order for the population, implement desired land reform policies, and focus on a "swift cleanup" of the state bureaucracy and immediate prosecution of war criminals, i.e., officials of the Fascist wartime regime of Marshal Ion Antonescu (see Romania during World War II and Romanian People's Tribunals).

To confirm Groza in office, elections were held on 19 November 1946. The count was rigged in order to give an overwhelming majority to the Bloc of Democratic Parties, a Communist-dominated front that included the Ploughmen's Front. Years later, historian Petre Țurlea reviewed a confidential Communist Party report about the election that showed the BPD had, at most, won 47 percent of the vote. He concluded that had the election been conducted honestly, the opposition parties would have won enough votes between them to form a coalition government—albeit with far less than the 80 percent support long claimed by opposition supporters.

=== The November 1946 elections ===
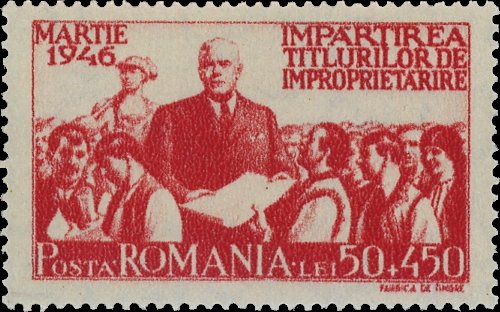
Groza on a 1946 Romanian stamp celebrating the 1945 "land reform"

After the failure of the royal strike, Mihai adopted a more cautious position with the government. In view of the elections, the governmental political forces constituted, on 17 May 1946, the Bloc of Democratic Parties to submit joint lists for the elections. BPD consisted of PCR, PSD, PNL-Tătărescu, PNȚ-Alexandrescu, FP, and PNP. Instead, the democratic parties, PNȚ, PNL, and PSDI, failed in their attempt to create a common opposition front. The government also amended the electoral law, so that for the first time in history, women could also participate in the electoral process. The election campaign was carried out by numerous and serious abuses by government forces and exacerbated opposition attacks against them. Although Washington and London repeatedly gave Maniu guarantees that the elections to be held would be free and supervised by the Western powers, the government did not hesitate to use Stalin's dictum in the electoral process: "It doesn't matter who votes with whom, it matters who count the votes". The elections took place on 19 November 1946, with a massive turnout. The official published results were: BPD – 69.81%, PNȚ – 12.88%, UPM – 8.32%, PNL – 3.78%, PȚD – 2.36%.

Immediately, the opposition accused the government of fraud, with Maniu claiming that the results had been reversed, so that in fact the PNȚ had won. Instead, the governing parties claimed that the election results reflected the citizens' adherence to the BND program, and the minor incidents that occurred were provoked by the opposition. In fact, it was the same Romanian electoral tradition that the government declared that the elections were fair, while the opposition accused them of fraud.

The same divergence existed between Moscow and the British and American officials. Reports arrived in Washington from the diplomatic mission of the Western powers and from the Ministry of the Interior in Bucharest, which had the same divergent content. The US and Great Britain limited themselves to some formal declarations, the agreement on the division of spheres of influence having been taken a long time ago. The memoirs prepared by Maniu and Brătianu were not taken into account, and on 1 December 1946, King Michael delivered the Opening Message of the Assembly of Deputies: "I am happy to be among the representatives of the country, gathered today for the first time, after a long interruption of parliamentary life."

=== Second Groza cabinet (1 December 1946 - 30 December 1947) ===
On 10 February 1947, Romania signed the Peace Treaty with the Allied and Associated Powers, so the regime of the Armistice Convention officially ended. This fact meant that the UK and the United States no longer had any leverage to intervene in favor of the opposition, Romania passing under the exclusive control of the USSR.

In the mind of the Groza government, the 1946 election confirmed it in office. This claim was made in the face of protests by the United States and the United Kingdom who held that, pursuant to the agreements reached at the Yalta Conference in 1945, only "interim governmental authorities broadly representative of the population", should be supported by the major powers. As a result, Groza's government was permanently estranged from the United States and the United Kingdom, who nominally supported the waning influence of the monarchist forces under King Michael I.

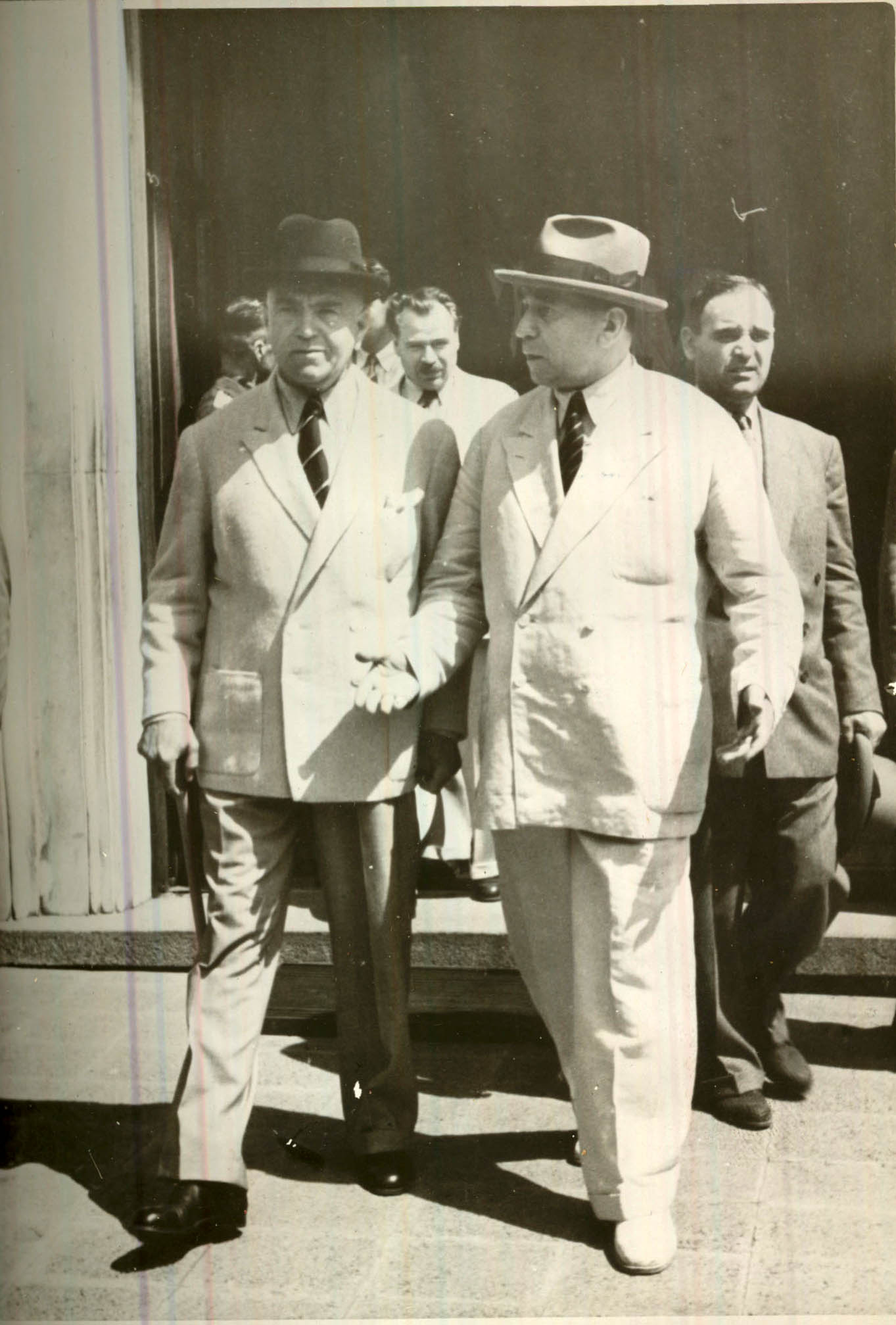
Groza (left), with Gheorghe Tătărescu and Gheorghe Gheorghiu-Dej, on a visit to Bulgaria, July 1947

Within days of becoming premier, Groza delivered his first major success. On 10 March 1945, the Soviet Union agreed to return to Romania Northern Transylvania, a territory of over 45,000 km^{2} (17,000 sq mi) that had been assigned to Hungary through the 1940 Second Vienna Award sponsored by Germany and Italy. Groza promised that the rights of each ethnic group within the restored territory would be protected (mainly, as a reference to the Hungarian minority in Romania), while Joseph Stalin declared that the previous government under Rădescu had permitted such a large degree of sabotage and terrorism in the region that it would have been impossible to deliver the territory to the Romanians. As a result, only after Groza's guarantee of ethnic minority rights did the Soviet government decide to satisfy the petition of the Romanian government. The recovery of this territory, nearly fifty-eight percent Romanian in 1945, was hailed as a major accomplishment within the formative stages of the Groza regime.

Groza continued to improve the image of his own government while strengthening the position of the Communist Party with a series of political reforms. He proceeded to eliminate any antagonistic elements in the government administration and, in the newly acquired Transylvanian territory, removed three city prefects, including that of the region's capital, Cluj. The prefects removed were immediately replaced by loyal government officials directly appointed by Groza, so as to strengthen loyalist elements in local government in the region. Groza also promised a series of land reform programs to benefit military personnel, which would confiscate and subsequently redistribute all properties in excess of 125 acres (51 ha) in addition to all the property of traitors, absentees, and all who collaborated with the wartime Romanian government, the Hungarian occupiers during Miklós Horthy and Ferenc Szálasi's régimes, and Nazi Germany.

Despite giving the appearance of liberal democracy by granting women's suffrage, Groza pursued a series of reforms attempting to clamp down on the prominence of politically dissident media outlets in the nation. During the first month of his premiership, Groza acted to close down Romania Nouă, a popular newspaper published by sources close to Iuliu Maniu, leader of the traditional National Peasants' Party who disagreed widely with Groza's attempted reforms. Within a month of his assumption of the premiership, Groza shut down over nine provincial newspapers and a series of periodicals which, Groza declared, were products of those, "who served Fascism and Hitlerism".

=== 1947-48: removal of opposition parties ===
After shutting down opposition newspapers, Groza soon continued his repression by limiting the number of political parties allowed within the state. Although Groza had promised to purge only individuals from the government bureaucracy and diplomatic corps immediately after assuming power, in June 1947 he began to prosecute entire political organizations, as, after the Tămădău Affair, he arrested key members of the National Peasants' Party and sentenced Maniu to life in prison "for political crimes against the Romanian people". By August 1947, both the National Peasants' Party and the National Liberal Party had been dissolved. In 1948, the Social Democratic Party was forced to unite with the Communists, thus creating the Romanian Workers' Party (PMR). Tat year the government coalition incorporated the PMR and the Hungarian People's Union, effectively minimizing all political opposition within the state.

==== Modus operandi ====
After the 1946 parliamentary elections, the essential political objective of the Groza government was to seize all power in the state and liquidate any forms of opposition. The plan was drawn up by the Minister of the Interior, Teohari Georgescu, and Panteley Bodnarenko, renamed Gheorghe Pintilie, a Soviet intelligence officer. From the beginning of 1947, the communist authorities have carried out numerous arrests against political opponents by committing serious abuses. On 14 July 1947, the Home Office authorities managed to set a trap for the main peasant-national leaders, who were preparing to leave for Great Britain to inform Western diplomats about the real situation in the country. The Tămădău affair was labeled as an act of national treason and turned into a major political case.

In order to allow the involvement of PNȚ and Iuliu Maniu, the authorities extended the charges from fraudulent attempt to leave the country to activities of a political nature. On 30 July 1947, through a journal of the Council of Ministers, it was decided to dissolve the National Peasant Party. On the same day, the Assembly of Deputies was convened, during which, based on a report drawn up by Teohari Georgescu, the dissolution was approved with 294 votes for and one against. The diary stated: "The National-Peasant Party under the presidency of Mr. Iuliu Maniu is and remains dissolved on the date of publication in the Official Monitor of this Journal. The same dissolution decision also includes all county, network and communal organizations of the aforementioned party, military, youth, women's organizations and any other organizations or associations led by this party".

On 1 November 1947, the National Liberal Party decided to cease its activity. Five days later, the Assembly of Deputies adopted a motion of no confidence in Gheorghe Tătărescu, the Minister of Foreign Affairs and the vice-president of the Council of Ministers. The following day, PNL-Tătărescu representatives resigned from the government. The trial of the PNȚ leaders took place between 29 October and 4 November 1947. The sentence was established in advance, based on accusations without material cover, based not on evidence, but on political indications coming from Moscow and presented in legal form in Bucharest. Iuliu Maniu and Ion Mihalache were the only ones sentenced to hard prison for life.

=== Proclamation of the republic ===
On 12 November 1947, King Michael and Queen Mother Elena went to London to witness the marriage of Princess Elizabeth, the heir to the British crown. Here he met Princess Anne de Bourbon-Parma. The two went to Lausanne, Switzerland, where they unofficially got engaged on 6 December 1947. Asking for the approval of the Romanian government, the answer that came 10 days later stated that the marriage was not opportune at that time.

The international press was already starting to speculate that the Romanian sovereign would stay abroad for a woman, abandoning his constitutional prerogatives. To refute the speculations, on 18 December 1947, Michael boarded the train in Lausanne and arrived in Bucharest three days later. After a meeting with Petru Groza, where no conclusion was reached, Michael and his mother went to Sinaia for the winter holidays. On Christmas Eve, Emil Bodnăraș (who, according to some information, had just arrived from Moscow, where he had received from Stalin the instructions regarding the organization of the abdication of King Michael), was inaugurated as Minister of National Defense.

At around 20:30 on the evening of 29 December, King Michael was informed about Groza's formal request to grant him an audience the next day, at 10:00. Initially, he assumed it was about his marriage.

Groza summoned Michael back to Bucharest, ostensibly "to discuss important matters"; the king had been preparing for a New Year's party at Peleș Castle in Sinaia. When Michael arrived, Groza presented the king with a pretyped instrument of abdication and demanded that Michael sign it. According to Michael's account, when he refused, Groza threatened to launch a bloodbath and arrest thousands of people. Michael eventually signed the document, and a few hours later parliament abolished the monarchy and declared Romania a republic.

Two bills were unanimously approved. The first took note of the abdication of King Michael I, for himself and his descendants, the Constitution of Romania was abrogated, and the new official name of the state became the Romanian People's Republic. It was also specified that the legislative power will be exercised by the Assembly of Deputies until its dissolution and the meeting of a Constituent National Assembly, which will be held at a date fixed by the Assembly of Deputies. It will adopt the new Constitution of the RPR. Through the second project, the members of the Provisional Presidium of the RPR were appointed: Constantin Ion Parhon, president, Mihail Sadoveanu, Ștefan Voitec, Gheorghe Stere, and Ion Niculi, vice presidents. The meeting ended after only one hour.

=== Premiership during the first years of the People's Republic (1948-1952) ===
On 24 February 1948, the Assembly of Deputies was dissolved. Three days later, the People's Democracy Front was established, an electoral alliance formed by the Romanian Workers' Party (the new name adopted by the Communists following the merger with the PSD), the Plowmen's Front, PNL-Bejan, and the Hungarian People's Union. On March 28, the elections were held for the Great National Assembly, the unicameral legislative forum of the RPR. The first objective of the Great Assembly was to draft a new fundamental law. The Constitution of the Romanian People's Republic was promulgated on 13 April 1948.

Groza kept his mandate as prime minister until 2 June 1952.

== Policies during the Groza-led governments ==
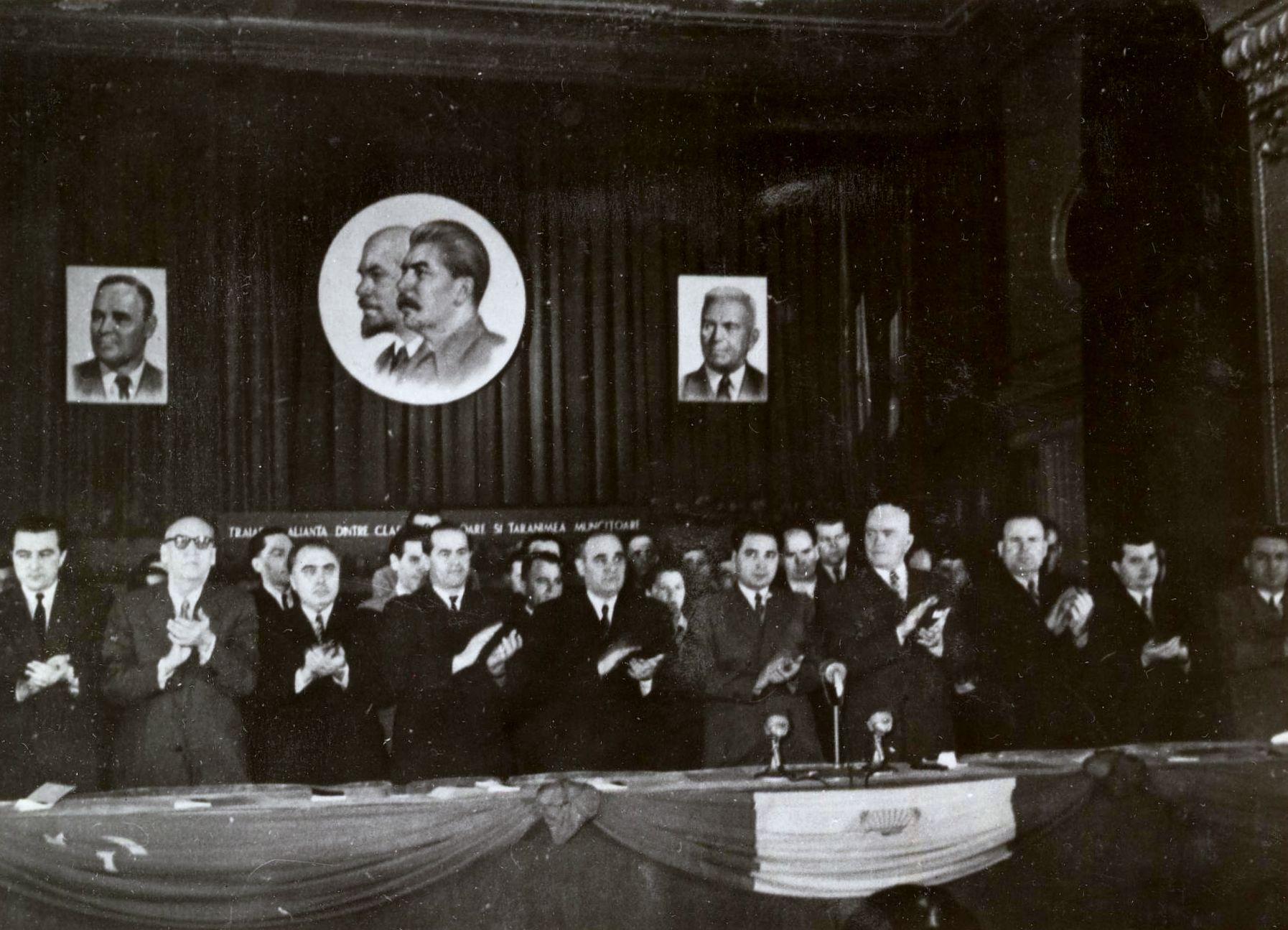
Petru Groza and Gheorghe Gheorghiu-Dej meeting with agricultural workers, February 1955

Starting from 1948, the communist authorities began to impose the Stalinist model of organization and management of society. On 11 June 1948, the Groza government passed the law for the nationalization of industry. This measure aimed at the destruction of private property and generalized public ownership in industry, banking, and transport. The State Planning Committee was created, which ensured economic development on a planned basis, based on economic centralism. Starting from 1951, the economic organization plan was for five years (the five-year plans).

Also following the Soviet model, the Collective Agricultural Farms and the State Agricultural Farms were established, which indicated the types of crops and fixed the prices of agricultural goods. Peasants were allowed to keep small plots of land, but which did not exceed 0.15 ha (0.37 acres). On the international level, Romania was a founding member of Comecon (1949) and of the Warsaw Pact (1955).

== Final years and death ==
Groza stepped down as premier on 12 June 1952, replacing Constantin Ion Parhon as president of the Presidium of the Great National Assembly, the institution that symbolically ensured the leadership of the RPR. He remained in this position as the de jure head of state of Romania until 1958, when he died from complications following a stomach operation.

Old and sick, Groza was forced to accept, on 7 February 1953, the dissolution of the Plowers' Front, a competitor and thorn in the side of the communists.

Petru Groza was buried at Ghencea Cemetery; his remains were later moved to the Carol Park Mausoleum, and finally to the cemetery in his native village, Băcia.

== Family ==
His daughter Maria Groza, who had served as his personal secretary, was later active in her own right as a diplomat and politician.

== Legacy ==
Groza never joined the PMR, thus achieving the political feat of placing himself in leading positions within the regime without ever having been a Communist Party member.

The mining town of Ștei in Bihor County was named Dr. Petru Groza after him, a name it kept until after the Romanian Revolution of December 1989. After his death in 1958, Transylvania Boulevard in Bucharest was renamed Dr. Petru Groza Boulevard; it is now named after Gheorghe Marinescu. There are streets named after Groza in Cluj-Napoca, Galați, and Medgidia.

A 4.5 m (15 ft) bronze statue of Groza, placed on a red Carrara marble pedestal, was unveiled in Deva in 1962. The monument, designed by sculptor Constantin Baraschi, was removed in 1990, and replaced in 1999 by a statue of Trajan; in 2007, Groza's statue was transported to Băcia.

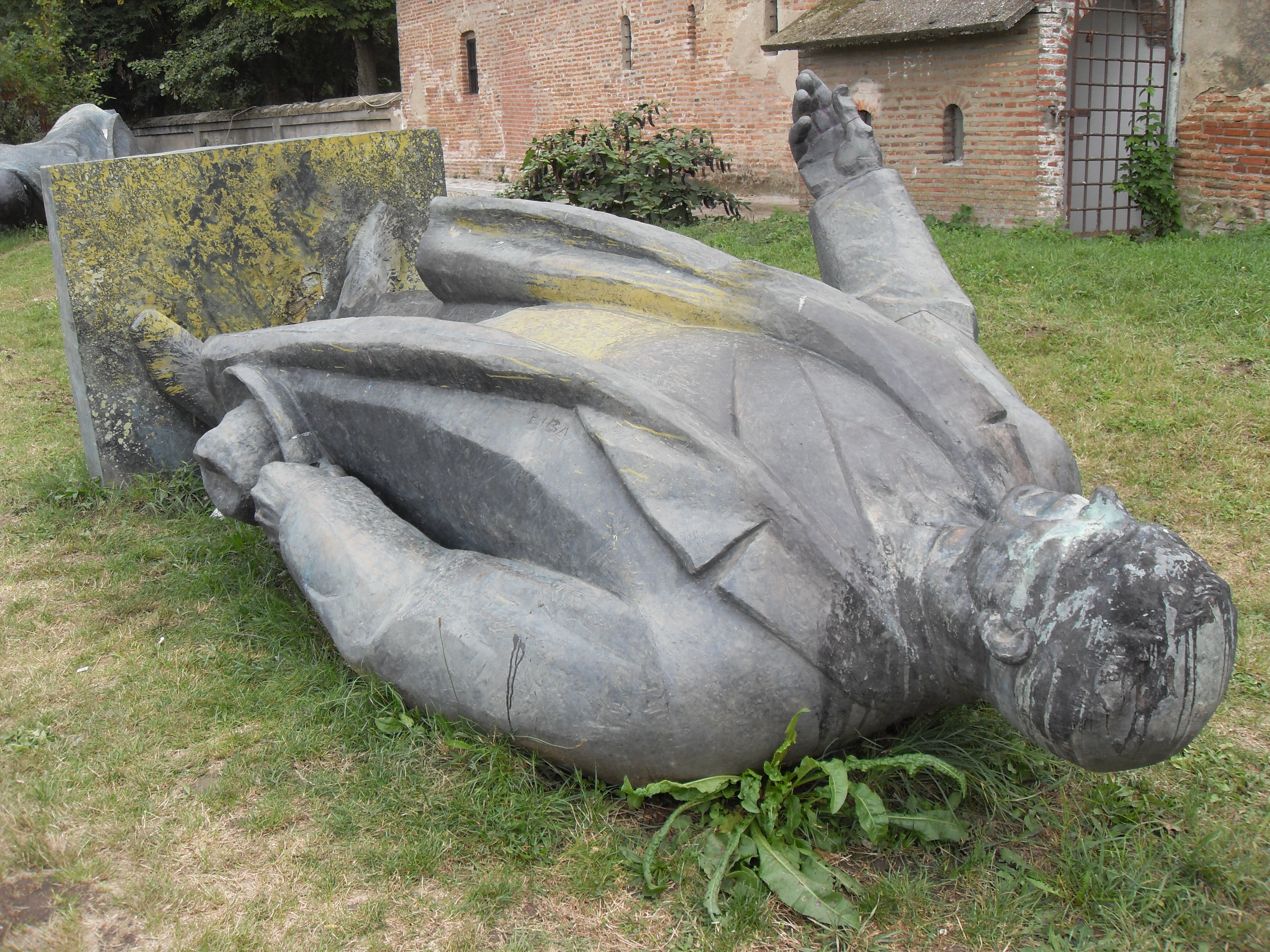
Fallen statue of Petru Groza next to Mogoșoaia Palace (2010)

Another statue of him, sculpted by Romulus Ladea, was inaugurated in the Cotroceni neighborhood of Bucharest in 1971; this statue was taken down in 1990, and replaced in 1993 by a monument to the Artillery Heroes. As of 2010, it lay in an open field near Mogoșoaia Palace, next to a statue of Vladimir Lenin that used to be in front of Casa Scînteii.

Party political offices
Preceded by Constantin Ion Parhon	President of the Presidium of the Great National Assembly of Romania; 12 June 1952 – 7 January 1958	Succeeded by Ion Gheorghe Maurer
Preceded by Nicolae Rădescu	Prime Minister of Romania; 6 March 1945 – 2 June 1952	Succeeded by Gheorghe Gheorghiu-Dej
