= Deviationism =

Person who expresses a deviation: an abnormality or departure

In political ideology, a deviationist is a person who expresses a deviation: an abnormality or departure. In Stalinist ideology and practice, deviationism is an expressed belief which does not accord with official party doctrine for the time and area. Accusations of deviationism often led to purges. Forms of deviationism included revisionism, dogmatism, and bourgeois nationalism.

In a 1953 speech, Mao Zedong referred to both left and right deviationists. Years later, in 1976, the Gang of Four would strike out against "rightist deviationism" in China.

== Trotskyism ==
Leon Trotsky believed that Lenin's pre-1917 idea of the "dictatorship of the proletariat" needed to be re-worded to emphasize the importance of the proletariat's leadership in such an alliance, because the peasantry were dialectically less capable of leadership. In order to finish a socialist revolution, the revolution would have to be world-wide. This is in sharp contrast to Joseph Stalin's idea of "socialism in one country"; Trotsky felt that if a socialist nation-state was isolated, it would soon be destroyed by outside imperialist forces. Trotsky emphasized the importance of soviets (independent councils of workers) and the idea that a communist society will be a "workers' democracy".

According to Trotskyist doctrine, the Soviet Union became a "degenerated workers' state" and the Communist Party of the Soviet Union (CPSU) became "bureaucratic centralist". Trotskyites considered the Soviet degenerated workers' state still as "revolutionary workers' state" or "proletarian dictatorship". As such, the Soviet state was "historically progressive" in relation to "reactionary capitalism". Hence it was the duty of revolutionists in all nations, even if they were opponents of Stalin and his regime, to defend the Soviet Union against any "imperialist" state, including their own fatherland. Another revolution was, however, necessary in order to unseat the Stalinists, who would destroy the workers' state until it became fully capitalist.

== Browderism ==
Before World War II the Communist Party USA (CPUSA) had always received directives and funds from the Soviet Union via courier. Moscow's most effective control had been through Comintern representatives.

CPUSA leader Earl Browder accepted the Molotov–Ribbentrop Pact of August 1939 without hesitation. Comintern did find it necessary to fine-tune the CPUSA's stance. Immediately after the Pact, Georgi Dimitrov, chief of the Comintern, sent a ciphered message to Browder explaining that the CPUSA's line supporting the Pact was not fully correct because while it broke with President Franklin Roosevelt's policy of supporting Britain, France, and Lend-Lease aid, it failed to take the additional step of breaking with FDR's domestic policies as well. Browder and the CPUSA immediately made the required changes in its policies, and in 1940 the CPUSA did its best to oppose FDR's reelection to the presidency.

World War II reduced the direct organization ties of CPUSA to Comintern and drastically reduced the volume of communications. Postal communications was less reliable and often delayed and subject to government inspection. International cable traffic was routinely reviewed by wartime security officials. Travel to the USSR became increasingly difficult. In 1940 the Voorhis Act was passed imposing regulatory requirements on domestic American organizations with foreign government ties. To avoid the Voorhis Act, in November 1940, CPUSA, with Comintern permission, severed its official membership in the Communist International, and the last officially designated CPUSA representative in Moscow left in 1941.

Browder developed the doctrine of indefinite collaboration with capitalism and the Harry Bridges doctrine of postwar extension of the no-strike pledge.

The wartime coalition gave Browder the vision of an Americanized Communist Party working with other American parties to solve the urgent questions facing the nation. To this end he began a policy of naturalizing the party, relaxing its discipline, and moderating its sectarianism. He transformed the wartime tactic of national unity into a postwar strategy and argued the possibility that progressive capitalism, to save itself, would embark on policies favorable to the workers at home and to the Soviet Union abroad.

In April 1945, however, Jacques Duclos of the French Communist Party, formerly high in the Comintern, published a repudiation of Browderism. Publication of the attack by the New York World–Telegram panicked the CPUSA into drastic action against Browder: it unceremoniously expelled him in February 1946.

== Titoism ==
Titoism is a form of Leninism based on the post-World War II regime of Marshal Josip Broz Tito in Yugoslavia. While formerly heading a Comintern liberation movement, after the war Tito broke with Moscow and insisted Yugoslavia was to be non-aligned with neither NATO nor the Warsaw Pact. Tito called for "national unity" and "self-management" which enabled Yugoslavia to form relationships independent of the superpowers with other governments during the Cold War.

== Maoism ==
Maoism mixes orthodox Marxism–Leninism with populism. Named after its originator Mao Zedong, the ideology relies on militant, insurrectionary and populist strategies in movement organizing (people's wars, Cultural Revolution, peasant uprising, etc.). Like Stalin, Mao's China relied on Five-Year Plans, the best-known of which was the Great Leap Forward.

This view of the CCP contrasted sharply with the view of Moscow whose ideology was in line with orthodoxy of historical materialism of Marxism's early thinkers, that socialist societies must be preceded by capitalist societies, which would provide the material basis for a socialist economy. This orthodox theory of Marxism relied heavily on a dialectical "force of history" that would bring about the "objective conditions" necessary for a proletarian revolution to succeed. Any ideological concepts running counter to this thesis, that is, any formulations which called for skipping stages of historic development were considered in the orthodox view as adventurist and counter revolutionary.

Maoist deviationism inspired students and other young people who looked to the Chinese Red Guards as a model of activism. While some of these young activists were drawn to the Progressive Labor Party (PLP), the full flowering of American Maoism would not come until the proliferation of new groups such as the Students for a Democratic Society (SDS), Weather Underground (WUO), Black Panthers (BPP) and the Communist Party (Marxist–Leninist) (CP–ML) after 1969.

== Other types ==
The term has also been used with respect to other ideologies. In 2002 the Religious Affairs Minister of Brunei in Southeast Asia used the same term to describe what he considered to be incorrect, presumably non-mainstream Islamic teachings.
