= Teohari Georgescu =

Romanian statesman and politician (1908–1976)

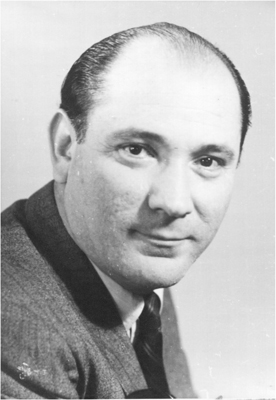

Interior Minister of Romania
- In office March 6, 1945 – May 28, 1952
- Preceded by: Nicolae Rădescu
- Succeeded by: Alexandru Drăghici

Personal details
- Born: January 31, 1908 Chitila, Ilfov County, Kingdom of Romania
- Died: December 31, 1976 (aged 68) Bucharest, Socialist Republic of Romania
- Resting place: Carol Park, Bucharest, Romania (until 1991)
- Party: Romanian Communist Party
- Profession: Typographer

Teohari Georgescu (January 31, 1908 – December 31, 1976) was a Romanian statesman and a high-ranking member of the Romanian Communist Party during the Stalinist period.

== Early life ==
Born in Chitila, near Bucharest, he was the third of seven children of Constantin and Aneta Georgescu. Georgescu, whose formal education ended after the fourth grade, began his career as an assistant in his father's store. In 1923, he was sent to the main printing house in Bucharest, Cartea Românească, to apprentice as a typesetter. Three years later, his father now dead, he joined the Gutenberg printers' union and secretly began to read Communist leaflets. He soon joined the Communist party, then illegal.

== Underground activity ==
Georgescu became a member of the party's Central Committee and its secretariat, participating in secret meetings, organising strikes, and spreading leaflets. Siguranța Statului, the Kingdom of Romania's secret services, began to keep an eye on him, and he was first arrested in 1933 for authoring leaflets that were spread in the typesetters' room at Cartea Românească. A young and capable lawyer, Iosif Schraer, ensured that Georgescu was released after only two months in prison and a few beatings.

In 1940, while in Moscow, Georgescu received training from NKVD agents, coordinated by Georgi Dimitrov; he learned both the secret code for corresponding with the Comintern, and a special technique for writing messages on glass.

Further arrests followed; finally, after being detained in April 1941, the next month he was sentenced to ten years' imprisonment at Caransebeș. Gheorghe Gheorghiu-Dej named him leader of the prison's communist group before being transferred to Târgu Jiu prison in 1943.

== Career peak (1944-52) ==
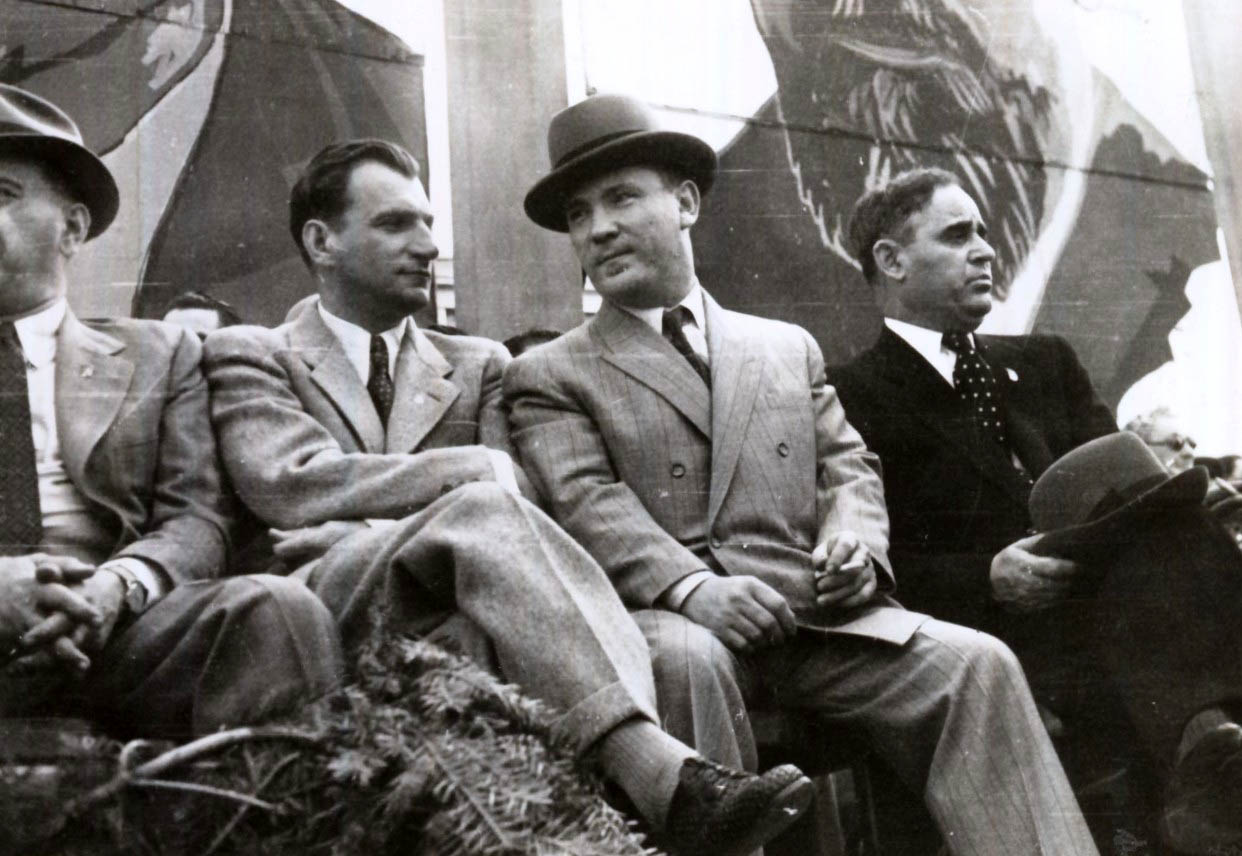
Lucrețiu Pătrășcanu, Teohari Georgescu, and Gheorghe Gheorghiu-Dej watching a May Day parade in Bucharest, 1946

He was released after the arrival of the Red Army in August 1944, and at Ana Pauker's suggestion he became undersecretary of state at the Ministry of Interior on November 4. He was considered by the Communists to be well-qualified for the clandestine work the job required, given his NKVD training and experience after 1940. In Bucharest he communicated, either directly or through Gheorghe Pintilie, with General Dmitri Fedichkin, a Soviet adviser who gave him orders to infiltrate and Sovietize the security services: Siguranța Statului (the secret police), the Gendarmerie, and Serviciul Special de Informații (lit. "Special Intelligence Service").

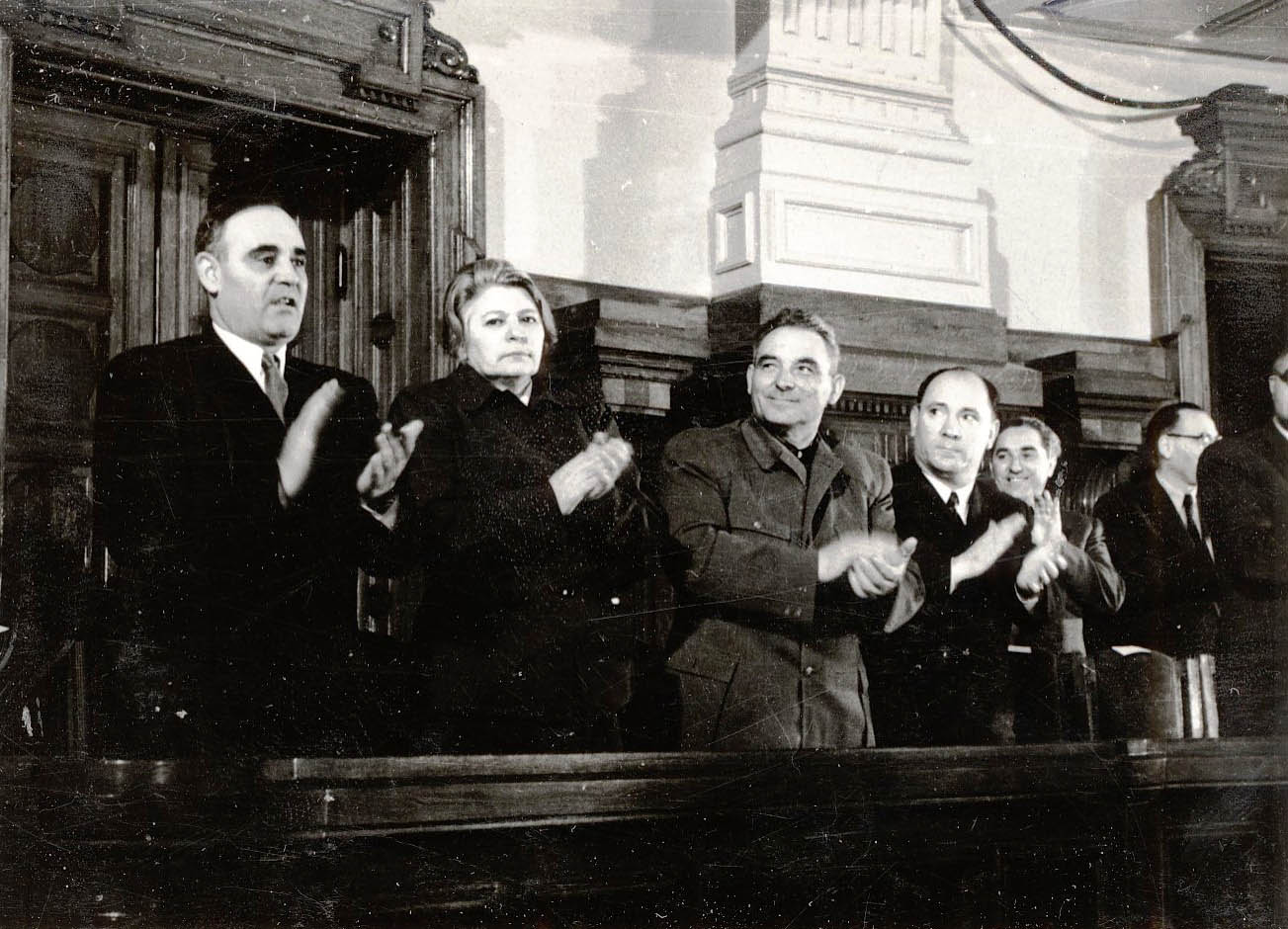
Gheorghe Gheorghiu-Dej, Ana Pauker, Vasile Luca, and Georgescu at the Great National Assembly in April 1951

As a reward for accomplishing this mission, Georgescu was promoted to Minister of Interior once Petru Groza's government took power on March 6, 1945. He also served on the Politburo, was the Secretary of the Party's Central Committee, and ran the United Workers' Front, which coordinated the actions of Communists and Social Democrats. As Minister of Interior he was in charge of the country's denazification and later to the reorganization of the law enforcement system along the Soviet model, supervising the establishment of several penal colonies and coordinating a Stalinist "dekulakization" repressiin campaign against non-compliant peasantry. Georgescu was also instrumental in setting up the administrative divisions of the Romanian People's Republic based on the Soviet model. Along with Gheorghiu-Dej, Pauker, and Vasile Luca, he was considered one of the leaders directing the new regime's policy, as highlighted by the popular rhyme "Ana, Luca, Teo, Dej / Bagă spaima în burgheji" (Ana, Luca, Teo[hari], Dej / Put the fear into the bourgeois"). Păstorel Teodoreanu mocked him in an epigram ridiculing the Groza government:

Guvernul lui Petru Groza
Petru Groza este fin,
Teohari e creştin,
Pătrășcanu este drept,
Iar Zăroni e deştept.

translating to

Petru Groza's Government
Petru Groza is refined,
Teohari is a Christian,
Pătrăşcanu is just,
And Zăroni is intelligent.

== Fall from grace 1952 ==
In January 1952, General Secretary Gheorghiu-Dej travelled to Moscow to seek Joseph Stalin's approval for purging the leadership of the Romanian Communist Party, accusing Pauker, Luca, and Georgescu of fomenting factional intrigue; Vyacheslav Molotov intervened on behalf of Pauker, whereas Lavrentiy Beria defended Georgescu. Together with Pauker and Luca, Georgescu was purged at the plenum of May 26–27, 1952, simultaneously accused of left-wing and right-wing deviationism. He was also accused of a conciliatory stance regarding Luca's deviation and, ironically, of insufficient militancy against the class enemy and revolutionary vigilance. He was thus dismissed from his ministerial post on May 28, losing all his other party and state posts as well: vice-premier, member of the secretariat, politburo and orgburo. Unlike the other two, he had not spent World War II in Moscow, but the Comintern's suggestion in 1940 that Georgescu be made General Secretary kept Gheorghiu-Dej wary of his influence. Furthermore, as Luca and Pauker began to fall from grace in early 1952 (their fate having been decided in Moscow), he made the mistake of standing by them. Initially "assigned to work at a lower level", he was arrested on February 18, 1953, and investigated by his former subordinates at the Securitate for three years. At one point, his wife and two children (one of them an infant) were arrested in order to induce him to give evidence against Lucrețiu Pătrășcanu. He confessed guilt to all charges, but was nevertheless released in April 1956.

Georgescu returned to his old workplace, Cartea Românească, now called "Întreprinderea 13 Decembrie", first working as a proofreader and then being appointed manager before retiring in 1963.

== Rehabilition under Ceaușescu (1968–1974) ==
After Nicolae Ceaușescu came to power in 1965, he was rehabilitated at the April 1968 plenary. He was appointed candidate member of the Central Committee at the party's 1972 national conference, holding the post until 1974. He died in obscurity; after cremation, his ashes were placed in the Monument of the Heroes for the Freedom of the People and of the Motherland, for Socialism in Bucharest's Carol Park, being removed after the Romanian Revolution of 1989.
