= Ana Pauker =

Romanian politician (1893–1960)

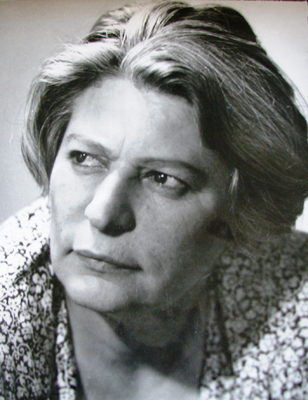

Minister of Foreign Affairs
- In office 30 December 1947 – 9 July 1952
- President: Constantin Ion Parhon; Petru Groza
- Prime Minister: Petru Groza; Gheorghe Gheorghiu-Dej
- Preceded by: Gheorghe Tătărescu
- Succeeded by: Simion Bughici

Personal details
- Born: Hannah Rabinsohn; 28 December 1893 Codăești, Vaslui County, Kingdom of Romania
- Died: 3 June 1960 (aged 66) Bucharest, People's Republic of Romania
- Party: Romanian Communist Party
- Other political affiliations: Social Democratic Party of Romania; Socialist Party of Romania; French Communist Party
- Spouse: Marcel Pauker (m. 1921; div. 1930)
- Domestic partner: Eugen Fried
- Children: Tanio, Vlad, Tatiana, Masha (Maria), Alexandru (adopted)
- Occupation: Communist activist
- Profession: Teacher
- Parents: Sarah and (Tsvi-)Hersh Kaufman Rabinsohn
- De facto leader of the RPR (in role with Gheorghe Gheorghiu-Dej): ← (First in role); Gheorghiu-Dej →

Ana Pauker (born Hannah Rabinsohn; 28 December 1893 – 3 June 1960) was a Romanian communist leader and served as the country's foreign minister in the late 1940s and early 1950s. Ana Pauker became the world's first female foreign minister when entering office in December 1947. She was also the unofficial leader of the Romanian Communist Party immediately after World War II. While considered extremely faithful to Stalin and Moscow, she conflictingly deviated from Stalin's line in many respects, in particular by opposing forced collectivization, not implementing the requested purges of communists, practicing a more moderate approach towards non-communists, and assisting the emigration of Jews to Israel.

== Biography ==
=== Early life and political career ===
Pauker was born on 28 December 1893 into a poor, religious Orthodox Jewish family in Codăești, Vaslui County (in central Moldavia), the daughter of Sarah and (Tsvi-)Hersh Kaufman Rabinsohn. Her father was a traditional slaughterer and synagogue functionary, her mother a small-time food seller. They had four surviving children; two more died in infancy.

As a young woman, Pauker became a teacher in a Jewish elementary school in Bucharest. While her younger brother was a Zionist and remained religious, she opted for Socialism, joining the Social Democratic Party of Romania in 1915 and then its successor, the Socialist Party of Romania, in 1918. She was active in the pro-Bolshevik faction of the group, the one that took control after the Party's Congress of 8–12 May 1921 and joined the Comintern under the name of Socialist-Communist Party (future Communist Party of Romania). She and her husband, Marcel Pauker, became leading members.

Pauker and her husband were arrested in 1923 and 1924 for their political activities and went into exile in Berlin, Paris, and Vienna in 1926 and 1927. In 1928, Pauker moved to Moscow to join the Comintern's International Lenin School, which trained senior Communist functionaries. In Moscow she became closely associated with Dmitry Manuilsky, the Kremlin's foremost representative at the Comintern in the 1930s.

=== Communist leadership position ===
Ana Pauker went to France, where she became an instructor for the Comintern being also involved in the communist movement elsewhere in the Balkans. She was one of the coordinators of the French Communist Party. Upon returning to Romania in 1935, she was arrested and shot in both legs when she tried to flee. Ana Pauker was the chief defendant in a widely publicized trial with other leading communists and was sentenced to ten years in prison. In May 1941, the Romanian government sent her into exile to the Soviet Union in exchange for Ion Codreanu, a former member of Sfatul Țării (the parliament of Bessarabia that voted for union with Romania on 27 March 1918), who was detained by the Soviets after their occupation of Bessarabia in 1940. In the meantime, her husband had fallen victim to the Soviet Great Purge in 1938. Rumors abounded that she herself had denounced him as a Trotskyist traitor; Comintern archival documents reveal, however, that she repeatedly refused to do so.

In Moscow, she became the leader of the Romanian communist exiles who later on became known as the "Muscovite faction". She returned to Romania in 1944 when the Red Army entered the country, becoming a member of the post-war government, which came to be dominated by the communists. In November 1947, the non-communist foreign minister Gheorghe Tătărescu was ousted and replaced by Pauker, making her the first woman in the modern world to hold such a post.

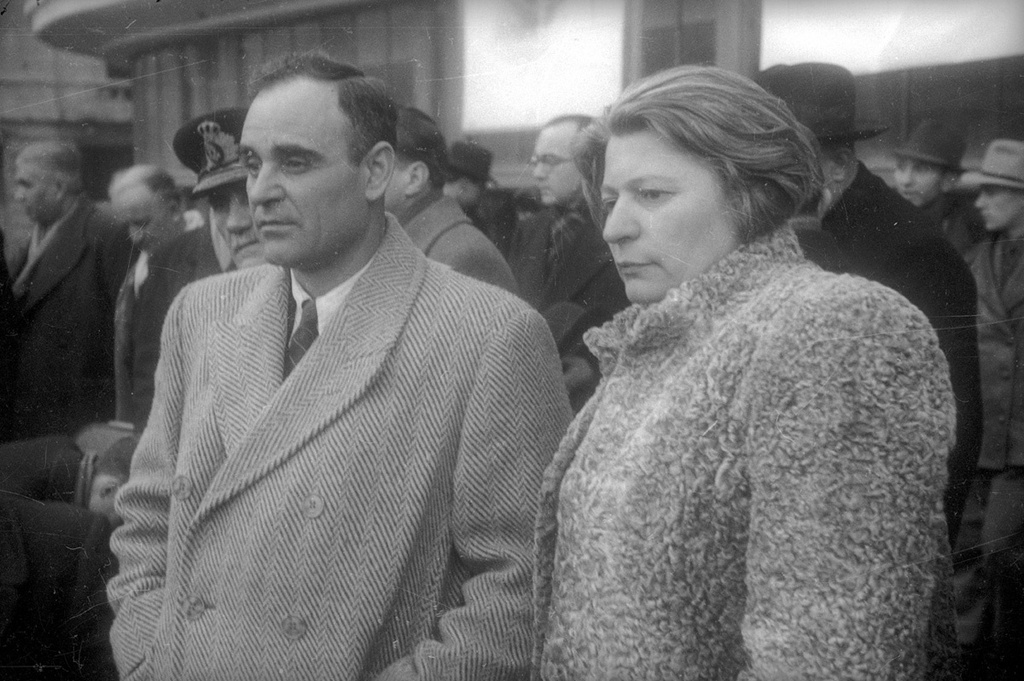
Pauker and Gheorghiu-Dej in Bucharest, March 1945

But it was her position in the Communist Party leadership that was paramount. Although she declined to become the General Secretary of the Romanian Communist Party because she was a woman, Jewish and an intellectual, and had proposed the Romanian worker Gheorghe Gheorghiu-Dej for the job instead, Pauker formally held the number-two position in the Party leadership and was a member of the four-person Secretariat of the Central Committee. "Arguably the Jewish woman who achieved the most political power in the 20th century," Ana Pauker was widely believed to have been the actual leader of the Romanian communists in all but name during the immediate post-war period. In 1948 Time magazine featured her portrait on its cover and described her as "the most powerful woman alive" at that time. Infamous as the "Iron Lady" of Romanian Communist politics, she was universally seen as unreservedly Stalinist and as Moscow's primary agent in Romania.

Unquestionably, Ana Pauker played a pivotal role in the imposition of communism on Romania. At the same time, however, she emerged as a force for moderation within the Romanian communist leadership during the early postwar period. Pauker was certainly complicit in the extensive purges and arrests in 1945 of tens of thousands of Romanians who were linked to the Ion Antonescu regime. Yet, by August 1945 Pauker and interior minister Teohari Georgescu released all but two to three thousand of those arrested, offering amnesty to any member of the fascist Iron Guard who had not committed serious crimes and who would turn in his weapons. In late 1944 or early 1945, she pushed for creating a more broad-based coalition with the National Peasants' Party and the National Liberal Party, but was overruled by Joseph Stalin; hence, the Communist-led government created in March 1945 comprised a more restrictive coalition with a faction of the National Liberals led by Gheorghe Tătărescu.

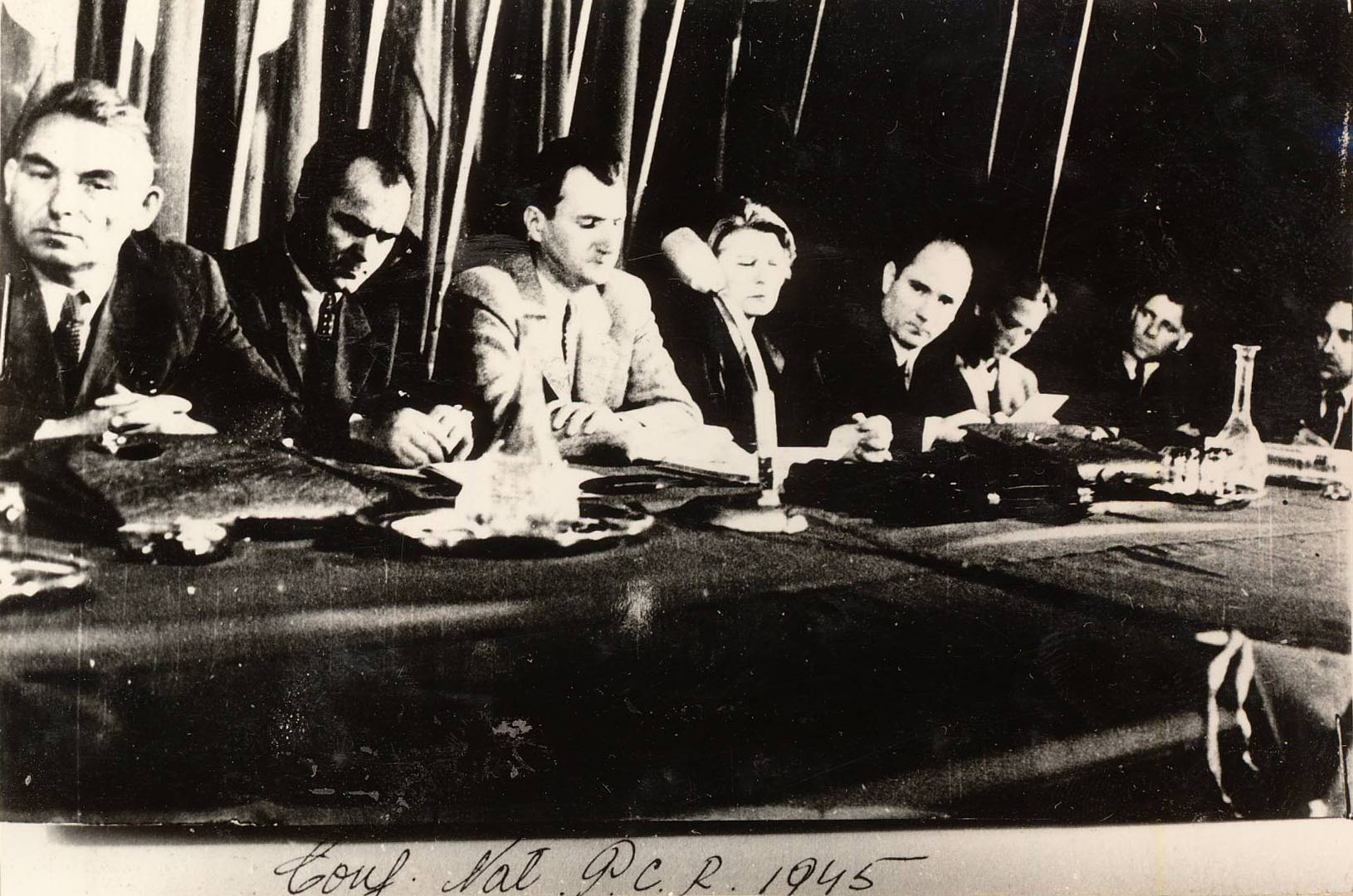
Vasile Luca, Constantin Pîrvulescu, Lucrețiu Pătrășcanu, Pauker, Teohari Georgescu, Florica Bagdasar, and Gheorghe Vasilichi at a Romanian Communist Party meeting in October 1945

During this same period, Pauker also pursued what she later described as "a type of Social Democratic policy" of mass recruitment of as many as 500,000 new Communist Party members without strict verification, including many former members of the Iron Guard. This policy would later be the subject of an attack on Pauker during her purge, and it was quickly overturned. Many of those who entered the party during Pauker's mass recruitment campaign would be purged between 1948 and 1950, and mass arrests would return with a vengeance in 1947 (including members of the National Peasants' Party and the National Liberal Party, as well as the amnestied members of the Iron Guard). Although she acceded to Soviet orders to arrest the leaders of the non-communist opposition, Pauker reportedly opposed the arrests of prominent National Peasants' Party officials Corneliu Coposu and Ghiță Pop and appealed to the presiding judge of the trial of National Peasants' Party leader Iuliu Maniu for leniency in his sentencing.

Reviewing her record during the early postwar years, the historian Norman Naimark stated she "encouraged coalitions with the 'historical' parties, urged compromises with 'bourgeois' politicians, and sought to deflect the persecution of social democrats and liberals."

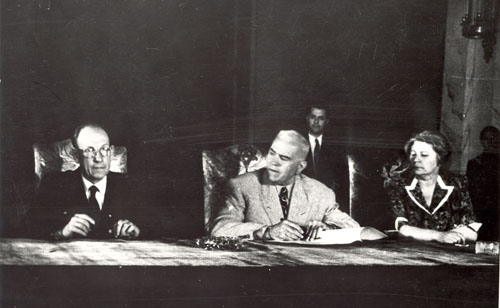
Antonín Zápotocký, Petru Groza, and Pauker in 1948

These contradictions would intensify as the regime became more Stalinist under Cold War pressures from 1947 on. Ana Pauker was a steeled and tested Stalinist who was "fanatically loyal to Stalin and the Soviet Union", who once admitted that "[i]f a Soviet official told me something, it was the gospel for me... If they had told me that the USSR needed it, I would have done it... [I]f they had told me to throw myself into the fire, I would have done it". Nevertheless, Pauker paradoxically promoted a number of policies counter to those of the Kremlin during the Cominform period of "high Stalinism", when the Soviet Union imposed a single, hegemonic line on all its satellites. In 1948 she opposed the verification and purge of the large number of members who entered the Communist Party during the mass recruitment campaign, even though the Cominform had ordered such a verification in every Bloc country. In 1949 she opposed the construction of the Danube-Black Sea Canal, even though, according to her own testimony, Stalin had personally proposed the project. In 1949–52 she opposed the purging of the Romanian veterans of the Spanish Civil War and French Resistance as part of Moscow's bloc-wide campaign against Josip Broz Tito or - at the very least - took no part in their repression, as they were not purged en masse in Romania until a few months after Pauker's downfall. And she was reported by colleagues and associates to have resisted Stalin's plans to have Justice Minister Lucrețiu Pătrășcanu put on trial, and was accused by the Securitate's chief Soviet adviser of having "sabotaged and postponed investigations" in the Pătrășcanu case. (This remains a subject of debate among historians, for there is a dearth of evidence in the Romanian archives on Pauker's position on Pătrășcanu, because all transcripts of Politburo discussions on the Pătrășcanu inquiry were summarily destroyed on the orders of General Secretary Gheorghe Gheorghiu-Dej.)

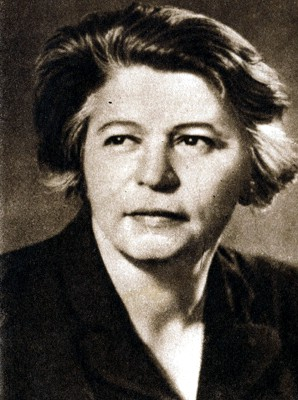
Pauker c. after 1945

In addition, Pauker supported, and helped facilitate, the emigration of roughly 100,000 Jews to Israel from the spring of 1950 to the spring of 1952, when all other Soviet satellites had shut their gates to Jewish emigration, and as Stalin's policies regarding population control and strict restrictions on emigration and travel were increasingly tightened. Her close friend and secretary Ana Toma was directly involved in helping Pauker's father Herș Rabinsohn to embark on a Jewish migrant ship bound for Mandatory Palestine, which was kept secret from others in the Communist party leadership.

Pauker firmly opposed forced collectivization that was carried out on Moscow's orders in the summer of 1950, while she was in a Kremlin hospital undergoing treatment for breast cancer. Angrily condemning such coercion as "absolutely opposed to the line of our party and absolutely opposed to any serious Communist thought", she allowed peasants forced into collective farms to return to private farming and effectively halted additional collectivization throughout 1951. This, as well as her support beginning in 1947 for higher prices for agricultural products in defiance of her Soviet "advisers", along with her favoring the integration of kulaks into the emerging socialist order, led Stalin to charge that Pauker had fatefully deviated into "peasantist, non-Marxist policies".

Pauker's "Moscow faction" (so called because many of its members, like Pauker, had spent years in exile in Moscow) was opposed by the "prison faction" (most of whom had spent the Fascist period in Romanian prisons, particularly in the Doftana Prison). Gheorghe Gheorghiu-Dej, the de facto leader of the "prison faction", had supported intensified agricultural collectivization, pushed for Lucrețiu Pătrășcanu's trial and execution, and was a rigid Stalinist; however, he resented some strains of Soviet influence (which would become clear at the time of de-Stalinization when, as leader of Communist Romania, he was a determined opponent of Nikita Khrushchev).

=== Downfall and scapegoating ===
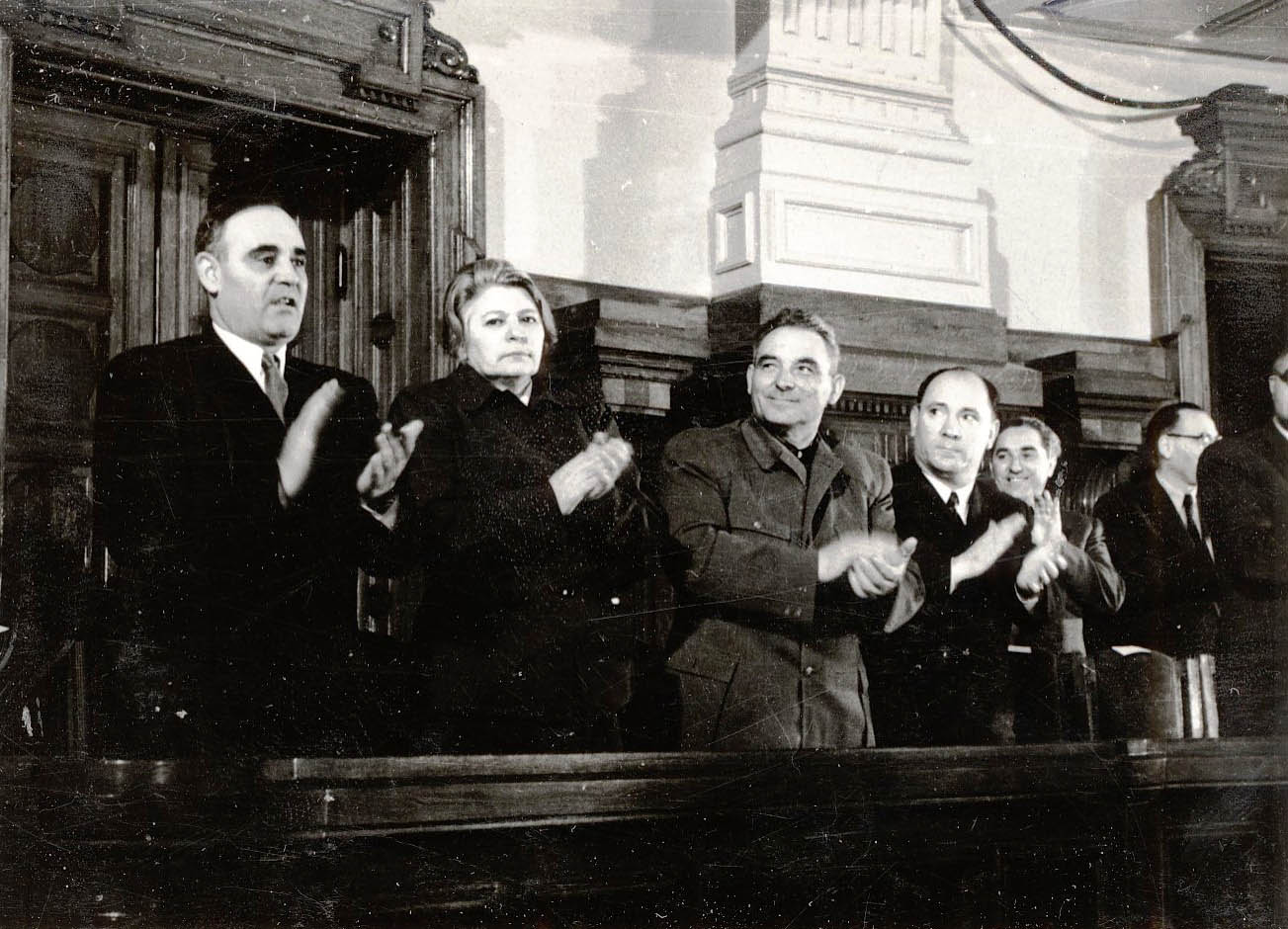
Gheorghe Gheorghiu-Dej, Pauker, Vasile Luca, and Teohari Georgescu at the Great National Assembly in April 1951

Gheorghiu-Dej profited from the anti-Semitism in Stalinist policy closely linked to Joseph Stalin's increasing paranoia, actively lobbying Stalin to take action against the Pauker faction. Gheorghiu-Dej travelled to Moscow in August 1951 to seek Stalin's approval for purging Pauker and her allies in the Secretariat (Vasile Luca and Teohari Georgescu). But archival evidence has led Vladimir Tismăneanu to conclude that "Ana Pauker's downfall did not occur merely, or even primarily, because of Gheorghiu-Dej's skillful maneuvering—as some Romanian novels published in the 1980s would have us believe—but foremost because of Stalin's decision to initiate a major political purge in Romania." Pauker, Luca, and Georgescu were purged in May 1952, consolidating Gheorghiu-Dej's own grip over country and Party.

The charges against Ana Pauker increasingly focused on her positions on Zionism and Israel. She was accused of supporting "the subversive and espionage activities of the Israeli Legation and of the Zionists in the country", of making secret commitments to Israeli diplomats, of displaying a "nationalist attitude on the emigration of Jews to Israel", and of divulging secrets to "the enemy" (the United States) through its principal agent, "international Zionism."

Pauker was arrested on 18 February 1953 and subjected to tightened interrogations and a soft form of torture in preparation for a show trial, as had occurred with Rudolf Slánský and others in the Prague Trials. After Stalin's death in March 1953 she was freed from jail and put under house arrest instead—the result of the direct intervention of Vyacheslav Molotov, who reportedly acted on the insistence of his wife Polina Zhemchuzhina, a friend of Pauker's and herself freed from prison soon after Stalin's death. When another Party leader informed Pauker of Stalin's death, she burst into tears—prompting her colleague to quip: "Don't cry. If Stalin were still alive, you'd be dead."

Following the Twentieth Party Congress in Moscow there were fears that Khrushchev might force the Romanian Party to rehabilitate Pauker and possibly install her as Romania's new leader. Gheorghiu-Dej went on to accuse her, Vasile Luca, and Teohari Georgescu for their Stalinist "excesses" in the late 1940s and early 1950. The period when all four were in power was marked by political persecution and the murder of opponents (such as the infamous brainwashing experiments conducted at Pitești prison in 1949–1952).

=== Later life ===
In 1956, she was summoned for questioning by a high-level party commission, which insisted that she acknowledge her guilt. Again, she claimed she was innocent and demanded that she be reinstated as a party member, without success.

During her forced retirement, Pauker was allowed to work as a translator from French and German for the Editura Politică publishing house.

=== Death ===
In the spring of 1959, Pauker was diagnosed with a terminal recurrence of cancer. She died on 3 June 1960 of cardiac arrest, after the cancer had spread to her heart and lungs.

== Analysis ==
Ana Pauker was recast by Romania's leaders in the official party history as having been a staunch ultra-orthodox Stalinist, even though she had opposed or had attempted to moderate a number of Stalinist policies while she was in a leadership position. As the historian Robert Levy concluded: "No other communist leader save Tito has been shown to have resisted the Soviet-imposed line [during the Cominform period of "high Stalinism"] as she did—whether on collectivisation, the fight against the kulaks and the urban bourgeoise, the prosecution of Lucrețiu Pătrășcanu, the purge of the Spanish Civil War and French Resistance veterans, the dimensions of the Five-Year Plan, the staging of a show trial of Romanian Zionists, or the facilitation of mass Jewish emigration".

== Legacy ==
Flag of the Anna Pauker Battery – Franco-Belgian Group

During the Spanish Civil War, while she was detained by the Royal Romanian Authorities, an artillery unit of the XI International Brigade was named after her.

Ana Pauker's legacy in Romania today is still tainted by the attempt of ruling party propagandists in the 1950s and 1960s to scapegoat her as the leader responsible for the crimes of the early Communist period. For instance, she is often referred to in Romania as "Stalin with a skirt" (Stalin cu fustă). Film director Radu Gabrea, who completed a feature-length documentary on Pauker in 2016, suggests that this demonising of Pauker is only possible because Pauker was a woman and of Jewish origin, and that it reflects the widespread antisemitism in Romania.

As historian Robert Levy put it: "Long the party's propagandists' scapegoat as the source of all the horrors of the Stalinist period, Ana Pauker continues to be vilified in post-communist Romania as the party leader most culpable for the post-war years' repression. But the truth is that this perpetually contradictory figure, though a Stalinist herself, and one who played a key role in imposing Communism on Romania, paradoxically presented an alternative to the rigid, harsh Stalinism that soon emblemised Romanian party life and left a hidden legacy as a persistent patron of Romania's peasantry within the communist hierarchy. The fall of Ana Pauker was a significant step in a process that precluded any reformist leadership from prevailing in Romania and fated its citizens to endure the extreme hardship that would culminate in the Ceaușescu regime."

== Family ==
Ana Pauker married Marcel Pauker in 1921, from whom she divorced in 1930. They had three children:

- Tanio (1921–1922);
- Vlad (1926–2016);
- Tatiana (1928–2011).

Though it was long alleged that she denounced the father of her three children as a Trotskyite, Comintern archival documents reveal, however, that she repeatedly refused to do so.

Ana Pauker had a fourth child, Masha (1932–2020), fathered by the Czech-Jewish Communist Eugen Fried; Masha (Maria), who was born in Moscow, was raised in France by her father. Pauker adopted a fifth child, Alexandru, in the late 1940s.
