= Virgil Solomon =

Romanian physician and politician

- Virgil Solomon in his parliamentary years.

Minister of Public Works
- In office 4 November 1944 – 6 March 1945
- Prime Minister: Constantin Sănătescu; Nicolae Rădescu
- Preceded by: Constantin Eftimiu
- Succeeded by: Gheorghe Gheorghiu-Dej

Personal details
- Born: August 27, 1894 Drăguș, Fogaras County, Austria-Hungary
- Died: August 4, 1972 (aged 77) Bucharest, Socialist Republic of Romania
- Party: National Peasants' Party
- Spouse: Erna Nick
- Children: 1

Virgil Solomon (27 August 1894 – 4 August 1972) was a Romanian physician and politician who served as the deputy general secretary of the National Peasants' Party from 1941 to 1944 and as Minister of Public Works from 4 November 1944 to 6 March 1945 in the Sănătescu and Rădescu cabinets.

== Family, studies and professional activity ==
Born on 27 August 1894 in Drăguș commune, Fogaras County, to an old boyar family mentioned in local documents as early as the 15th century. His father, Leon Solomon, was a public notary and the owner of 15 hectares (37 acres) of land and of a manor house in Voila. His mother, Ana, was from the Vasu family in Arpaș, also mentioned in documents since the 16th century.

At 17, Solomon applied to the Medical School in Cluj and continued his medical studies in Budapest, Vienna, and back again to Cluj. In 1916, he married Erna Nick. They had a son, Gheorghe Virgil Francisc Solomon, a future diplomat.

Drafted into the Austro-Hungarian Army, he participated in the First World War as part of the reserve force, working in medical institutions around Vienna. After the war, he worked as a social insurance doctor in Sighișoara and as chief doctor of the Târnava-Mare County.

== Political career ==
He became politically active during his student days. On 1 December 1918, he attended the Great National Assembly in Alba Iulia, where, as a delegate of the "Young Romania" Academic Society of Romanian students in Vienna, he expressed his support for the Union of Transylvania with Romania.

In 1924, according to an investigation of the Securitate, he sent a memo to the leadership of the National Peasants' Party (P.N.Ț.), explaining that the party branch in Odorhei County needed reshuffling, because the local organisation had dissolved after the departure of the leaders. Iuliu Maniu then entrusted him with the task of rebuilding the Odorhei party branch.

From 1926 onwards, he ran in parliamentary elections and two years later won his first parliamentary mandate (from Odorhei). He was re-elected in Odorhei in 1932; after the dissolution of Parliament and the new elections in 1933, he became a substitute deputy and, in 1935, an active deputy for Someș County after the main candidate withdrew. It was during this term that Solomon was assaulted in Parliament by representatives of Octavian Goga's pro-Fascist party. Corneliu Coposu recalled the moment in an article: "Why was the Peasants' Party leader slaughtered? Because Hitler's mercenaries, illiterate in politics and parliamentary manners, are incapable of civilised combat, of serious discussion, of human reasoning. And their ideological erudition culminates in... a fight... Because the so-called "right-wing" party is diligently striving to lower parliamentary dignity, to compromise the democratically elected regime, to bring down the institution that has promoted civilisation and uplifted peoples, to torpedo the system that thwarts dictatorship. Dictatorship and adventurous attempts, the sorry values in which these would-be pioneers of Christianity believe. And, finally, because Virgil Solomon is a fearless soldier of the truth, a leader of the Maniu line of action – that these good-for-nothing gangs so much... "adore", – a feared debater, undefeated in the real parliamentary battle, who never once lets himself be intimidated by the terror of parade nationalism."

In 1937 he again won a seat, but Parliament was dissolved before it even assembled. During the Second World War, he was appointed deputy secretary general of the P.N.Ț. for Transylvanian affairs.

In the run-up to the coup d'état of 23 August 1944, Solomon, an intimate of Iuliu Maniu, was part of the team that collaborated with King Michael I to get Romania out of the alliance with Nazi Germany and to continue the war alongside the Allies, with the immediate objective of liberating Transylvania. In an interview with the Associated Press in 1945, Corneliu Coposu reported: "Among the Nationalist leaders who played a leading role, giving unlimited support to (party) Chairman Maniu, I must include the names of Messrs. Ion Mihalache, Ghiță Pop, Ion Hudiță, Virgil Solomon...", and then added other 22 names. Alongside Hudiță, Solomon was the liaison to the Liberal Party.

After the Royal Coup of 23 August 1944, as the Allies decided that the political forces should collaborate with the communists, P.N.Ț. became part of the ensuing coalition governments. Virgil Solomon was appointed Minister of Public Works and Reconstruction and served in the governments led by Constantin Sănătescu (II) and Nicolae Rădescu, from 4 November 1944 to 6 March 1945.

Afterwards, he resumed his party duties, as chief of the Odorhei branch as well as a member of the P.N.Ț. representative body, from September 1945 to the day he was arrested, on May 5, 1947.

== In communist detention ==
Solomon was among the first Peasants' Party members to be arrested. The initiative, he recalled, had belonged to communist Vasile Luca, who was heard saying that "Solomon must be immobilized" because of his intransigent position before the 1946 Romanian general elections.

With no arrest warrant to his name until 1954 and without trial, Solomon was held from 1947 to 1955 as a political prisoner in prisons at Jilava, Pitești, Aiud, Ocnele Mari and, finally, Sighet, where he was brought in an ambulance.

After 5 July 1955, he was placed into forced residence in the Bărăgan Plain, first in the village of Măzăreni (1955–1960), then in Rubla (1960–1964). In total, he served 17 years of detention and restrictions based on mere administrative decision, without ever being brought to trial.

== The final years ==
In March 1964, all his restrictions were finally lifted and he was allowed to move to Bucharest. He lived another 8 years, until 4 August 1972, spending most of his time either working on his memoirs, which he had started writing in 1956, reading or meeting former political friends, but avoiding any discussion of politics.

== Published books ==
Part of Virgil Solomon's memoir „notebooks” were published in November 2024 in the book Trecutul ne-ajunge din urmă. Memoriile unui martor privilegiat al istoriei. 1921–1947 (The Past Catches Up. The Memoirs of a Privileged Witness to History. 1921-1947) by Humanitas Publishing, in an edition supervised, with an introductory study and notes by historian Claudiu Secașiu and a preface by the author's grandson, Michael Virgil Solomon.

== Bibliography ==
- Andrea Dobeș (2021). Spații carcerale în România comunistă. Penitenciarul Sighet (1950–1955), vol. II: Detenție și post detenție: repere biografice. Istorie, documente, mărturii. Cluj-Napoca: Editura Argonaut. ISBN 978-606-085-039-7. OCLC 1311417840.
- Arhiva Consiliului Național pentru Studierea Arhivelor Securității (ACNSAS), fond Penal, dosar 444, vol 1, Proces verbal de interogatoriu, 8 April 1955.
- Corneliu Coposu, Icoană cernită, in România Nouă (Cluj), Nr. 68, 25 March 1936.
- Ioan Hudiță (1997). Jurnal politic: 1 ianuarie–24 august 1944. București: Editura Roza Vânturilor. ISBN 9789739003513. OCLC 37888657.
- Ioan-Aurel Pop, Contribuții studențești la mișcarea pentru unirea Transilvaniei cu România (1918), Studia Univ. Babeș-Bolyai, Historia 2, 1978.
- Marin Pop (2020). Corneliu Coposu sub lupa securității - declarații, corespondențe, conferințe și scrieri inedite. Fapte, idei, documente. București: Editura Vremea. ISBN 978-606-081-012-4. OCLC 1268123050.
- Monitorul Oficial, CXII, 257, 5 noiembrie 1944.
