= Ioan Mihail Racoviță =

Romanian general (1889–1954)

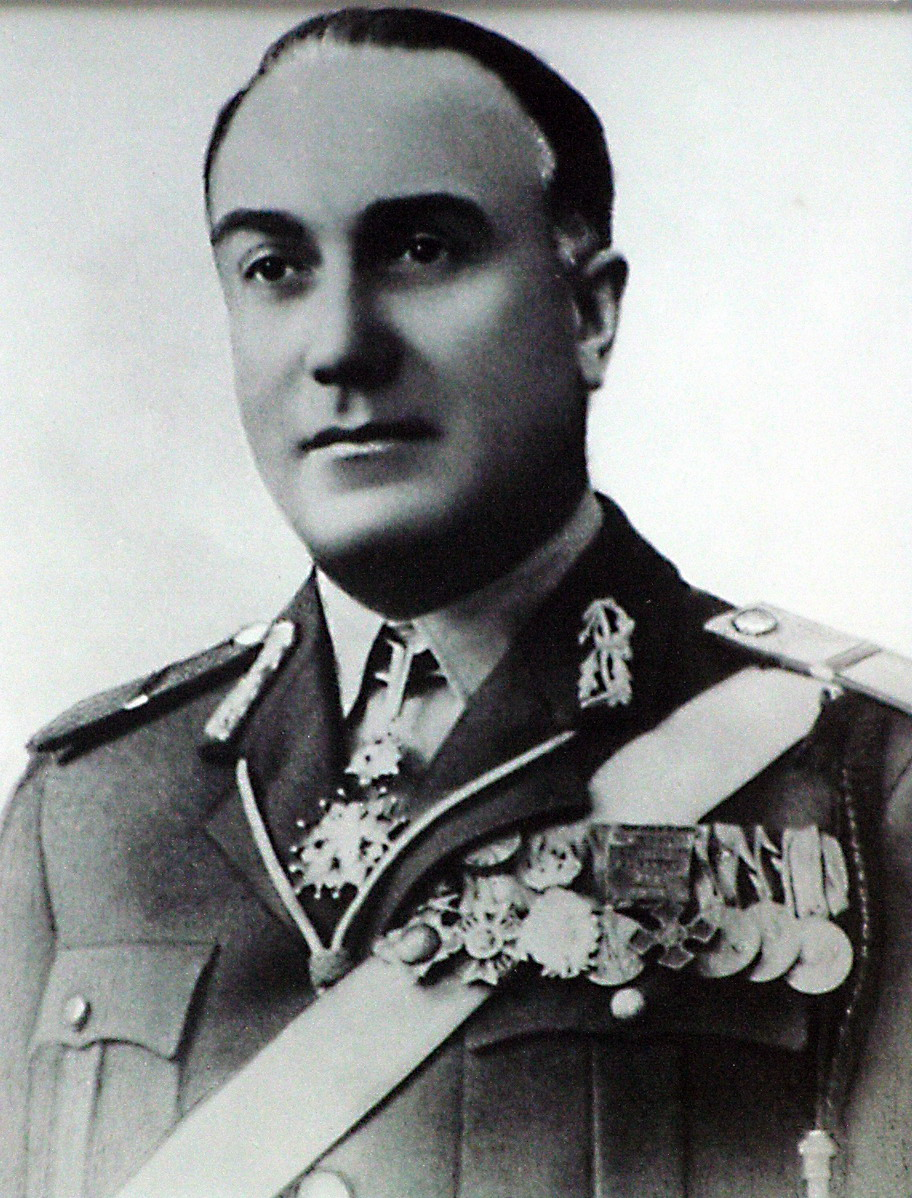
- General Ioan Mihail Racoviță
- Born: March 7, 1889; Bucharest, Kingdom of Romania
- Died: June 28, 1954 (aged 65); Sighet Prison, Romanian People's Republic
- Education: Higher War School

65th Minister of Defense
- In office 23 August 1944 – 5 November 1944
- Prime Minister: Constantin Sănătescu
- Preceded by: Constantin Pantazi
- Succeeded by: Constantin Sănătescu
- Military career
- Allegiance: Romanian Army
- Branch: Infantry
- Rank: General
- Commands: 4th Army; 1st Army
- Conflicts: Second Balkan War; World War I; World War II; Eastern Front; Operation München; Battle of the Sea of Azov; Battle of the Caucasus; First Jassy-Kishinev Offensive; First Battle of Târgu Frumos; Second Battle of Târgu Frumos; Second Jassy–Kishinev Offensive
- Awards: Order of the Crown of Romania Commander Class; Order of Michael the Brave, 3rd Class; Iron Cross, 2nd and 1st Class; Knight's Cross of the Iron Cross

Ioan Mihail Racoviță (7 March 1889, Bucharest – 28 June 1954, Sighet Prison) was a Romanian general during World War II, and Minister of Defense in the aftermath of King Michael's Coup of August 1944.

== Biography ==
In 1906 he was admitted to the Infantry and Cavalry Officers' School. After one year he was sent to pursue his training at the Military School in Hannover, Germany, from where he graduated in 1909. Upon returning to Romania, he was assigned with the rank of second lieutenant to the 2nd Roșiori Regiment from Bârlad. He went back to Germany in 1910 to attend the Officers Riding School at Paderborn, which he completed in 1911. Promoted to lieutenant, he served with the 2nd Regiment in the Second Balkan War of 1913. He fought during the Romanian Campaign of World War I, being promoted to captain in 1916, and to major in 1917.

After the war, Racoviță was admitted to the Higher War School, graduating in 1921. In 1923 he became a lieutenant colonel, and in 1928 a colonel. He was promoted to the rank of brigadier general in May 1936, and to major general in June 1940.

He commanded the Romanian Cavalry Corps during the initial phase of Operation Barbarossa in June 1941. With his corps he advanced from Romania to the Caucasus. He participated in Operation München, the Battle of the Sea of Azov and the Battle of the Caucasus. In May 1942 he was promoted to lieutenant general. He was replaced on 1 January 1943 and called back to Romania.

Racoviță was recalled into active service on 25 January 1944 and took over the command of the 4th Army, which had to be completely rebuilt after the Battle of Stalingrad. He led the army in spring and summer of 1944, in defensive battles in Northern Romania against the advancing Red Army. Together with the Wehrmacht, the 4th Army repulsed several Soviet attacks in the First Jassy-Kishinev Offensive, First Battle of Târgu Frumos and Second Battle of Târgu Frumos. In July 1944 he was awarded the Knight's Cross of the Iron Cross of Nazi Germany.

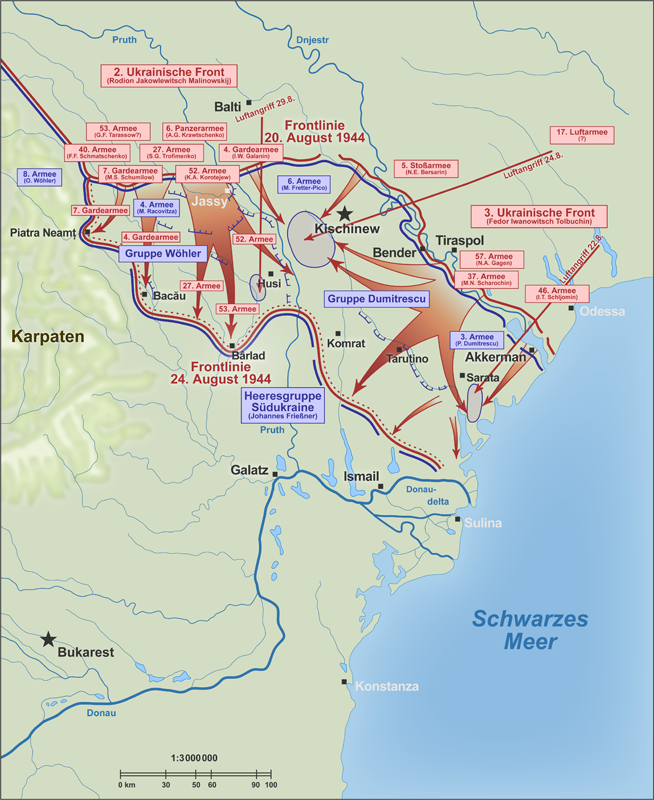
The Soviet Jassy–Kishinev offensive of August 1944

At the start of Second Jassy–Kishinev offensive on 20 August 1944, he was in command of the 4th Army (part of the Army Group Wöhler), facing Rodion Malinovsky's 2nd Ukrainian Front west of Iași. Racoviță's forces fell back towards Bacău, and he was replaced three days later by general Ilie Șteflea. During the 23 August coup d'état he played an important role, alongside the communist activist Emil Bodnăraș and generals Dumitru Dămăceanu and Aurel Aldea. That same day, he was appointed Minister of Defense in the new pro-Allied government of General Constantin Sănătescu. He remained in this position until 5 November 1944, when he was named General Inspector of the Cavalry.

Between 20 May 1945 and 20 May 1946 Racoviță was the Commandant of 3rd Inspectorate-General. He was then promoted to the rank of general and given the command of the 1st Army until 30 June 1947. On 1 September 1947 he was retired.

In June 1950, he was arrested and imprisoned at Sighet Prison, where he died on 28 June 1954.

== Awards ==
- Order of the Crown of Romania, Commander Class (8 June 1940)
- Order of Michael the Brave, 3rd Class (17 October 1941)
- Iron Cross (1941), 2nd and 1st Class
- Knight's Cross of the Iron Cross (7 July 1944)
