= Constantin Eftimiu =

Romanian general

- Born: 28 June 1893; Bucharest, Kingdom of Romania
- Died: 19 September 1950 (aged 57); Aiud Prison, Aiud, Cluj Region, Romanian People's Republic
- Education: Higher War School

Minister for Public Works and Communications
- In office 23 August 1944 – 3 November 1944
- Prime Minister: Constantin Sănătescu
- Preceded by: Constantin Al. Constantinescu
- Succeeded by: Virgil Solomon (Public Works); Gheorghe Gheorghiu-Dej (Communications)
- Military career
- Allegiance: Kingdom of Romania
- Branch: Army
- Service years: 1912–1945
- Rank: Brigadier general
- Conflicts: World War I; World War II; Operation München; Siege of Odessa; Battle of Stalingrad
- Awards: Order of the Star of Romania; Order of the Crown (Romania); Order of Michael the Brave
- Other work: Anti-communist resistance leader (1945–46)

Constantin Eftimiu (28 June 1893 – 19 September 1950) was a Romanian brigadier general during World War II and Minister for Public Works and Communications in the First Sănătescu cabinet.

== Biography ==
=== Early years ===
He was born in Bucharest in 1893. After attending the Artillery Military School from 1912 to 1914, he graduated with the rank of second lieutenant. Once Romania entered World War I on the side of the Entente, Eftimiu fought as a platoon commander, advancing to lieutenant in November 1916 and to captain in September 1917. After the war, he attended the Higher War School from 1924 to 1926, after which he was promoted to major. He advanced in rank to lieutenant in colonel in 1934, and to colonel in 1938. On 8 June 1940 he was awarded the Order of the Star of Romania, officer rank.

=== World War II ===
Romania joined Operation Barbarossa on 22 June 1941 in order to reclaim the lost territories of Bessarabia and Northern Bukovina, which had been annexed by the Soviet Union in June 1940. At the start of the war, Eftimiu was Chief of Operations Section for the 4th Army. He crossed the Prut River at Bogdănești on 22 June, and in mid-July he took part in Operation München, leading a detachment which advanced from the Hîncești forest to Tighina. From 26 August to 26 October he was Commanding Officer of Detachment "Eftimiu"; during the Siege of Odessa, he fought at Frantzfeld. For his actions, Eftimiu was decorated on November 7, 1941, with the Order of the Crown with swords in the rank of Commander, and on 12 February 1942 with the Order of Michael the Brave, 3rd class.

He then returned to Bucharest, where he was named Director of Studies at the Higher War School. In June 1942 he became Vice Chief of Staff for General Petre Dumitrescu's 3rd Army, which fought at the Battle of Stalingrad later that year. In April 1943, Eftimiu returned from the front and was appointed commander of Signals Headquarters. In March 1944 he was promoted to brigadier general. After the coup d'état of 23 August, he served until 3 November as Minister of State Secretary for the Department of Public Works and Communications in the first Government of Constantin Sănătescu. He then returned to the Signals Command, after which he served as Vice Chief of the General Staff from January to July 1945.

=== Final years ===
Together with General Aurel Aldea (with whom he had served in the Sănătescu cabinet) and Admiral Horia Macellariu, he sought to form a National Resistance Movement, in order to oversee the disparate anti-communist resistance groups and to organize an armed insurrection. In this framework, Eftimiu helped initiate the resistance movement in the mountain passes of the Eastern Carpathians. He was arrested in May 1946, and tried for conspiracy and rebellion by the Bucharest Military Tribunal. The presiding judge was General Vasile Atanasiu; other judges included generals Mihail Lascăr, Ilie Crețulescu, and Constantin Argeșanu. Condemned to life in prison and hard labor on 18 November 1946, he died at Aiud Prison in September 1950 of an intracerebral hemorrhage.
