= Second Sănătescu cabinet =

Government of Romania in 1944

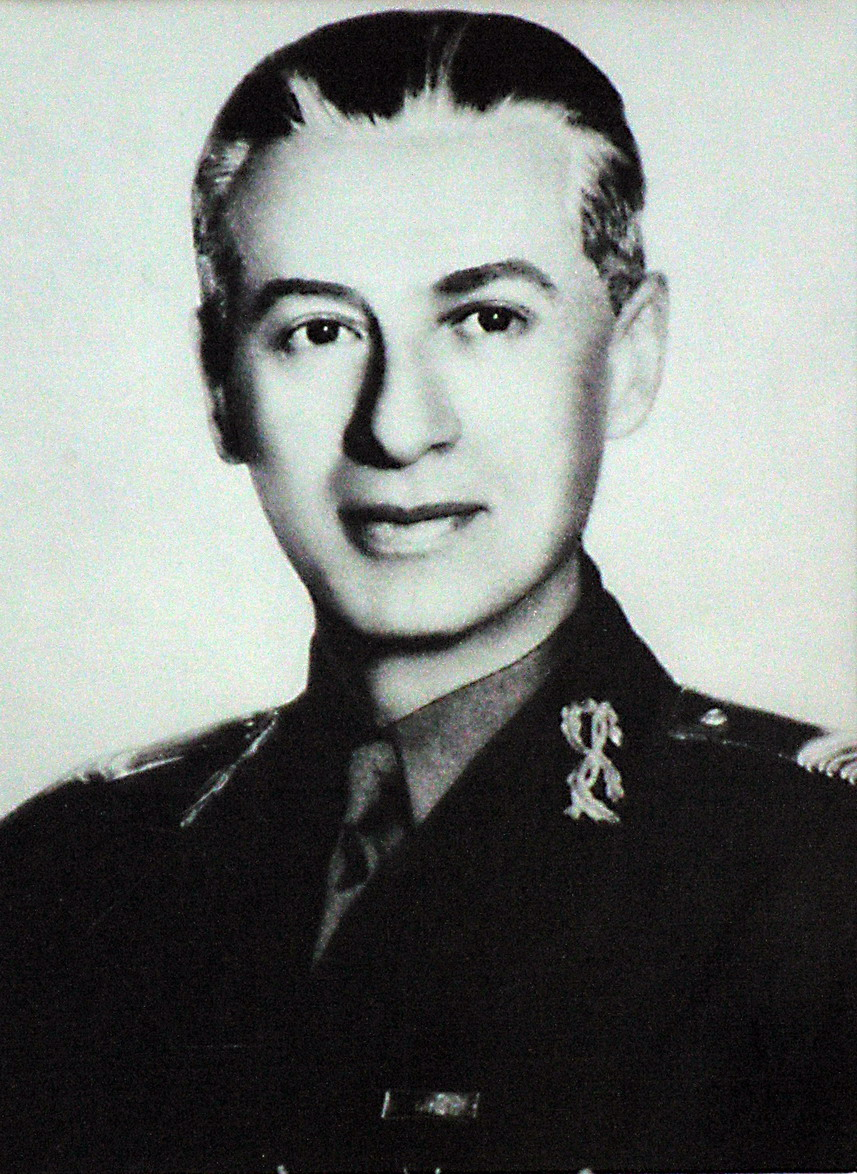
Constantin Sănătescu

The second Sănătescu cabinet was the government of Romania from 4 November to 5 December 1944.

== Composition ==
The ministers of the cabinet were as follows:

- President of the Council of Ministers:

- Gen. Constantin Sănătescu (4 November – 5 December 1944)

- Vice President of the Council of Ministers:

- Petru Groza (4 November – 5 December 1944)

- Minister of Internal Affairs:

- Nicolae Penescu (4 November – 5 December 1944)

- Minister of Foreign Affairs:

- Constantin Vișoianu (4 November – 5 December 1944)

- Minister of Finance:

- Mihail Romniceanu (4 November – 5 December 1944)

- Minister of Justice:

- Lucrețiu Pătrășcanu (4 November – 5 December 1944)

- Minister of National Education:

- Ștefan Voitec (4 November – 5 December 1944)

- Minister of Religious Affairs and the Arts:

- Ghiță Popp (4 November – 5 December 1944)

- Minister of War:

- (interim) Gen. Constantin Sănătescu (4 November – 5 December 1944)

- Minister of War Production:

- Constantin (Bebe) Brătianu (4 November – 5 December 1944)

- Minister of Agriculture and Property

- Ioan Hudiță (4 November – 5 December 1944)

- Minister of National Economy:

- Aurel Leucuția (4 November – 5 December 1944)

- Minister of Communications:

- Gheorghe Gheorghiu-Dej (4 November – 5 December 1944)

- Minister of Public Works:

- Virgil Solomon (4 November – 5 December 1944)

- Minister of Cooperation:

- George Fotino (4 November – 5 December 1944)

- Minister of Labour:

- Lothar Rădăceanu (4 November – 5 December 1944)

- Minister of Social Insurance:

- Gheorghe Nicolau (4 November – 5 December 1944)

- Minister of Health and Social Assistance:

- Daniel Danielopolu (4 November – 5 December 1944)

- Minister of Minorities:

- Gheorghe Vlădescu-Răcoasa (4 November – 5 December 1944)

Preceded by First Sănătescu cabinet	Cabinet of Romania; 4 November 1944 - 5 December 1944	Succeeded by Rădescu cabinet
