= Daniel Danielopolu =

Romanian physiology and therapist (1884–1955)

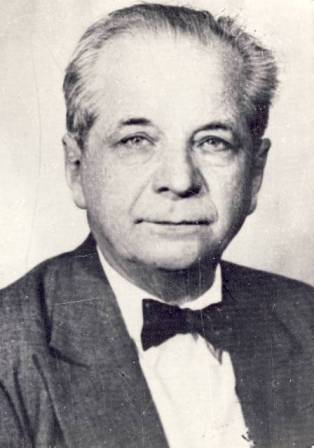
- Daniel Danielopolu
- Born: April 12, 1884; Bucharest, Kingdom of Romania
- Died: 29 April 1955 (aged 71); Bucharest, Romanian People's Republic
- Resting place: Bellu Cemetery, Bucharest
- Citizenship: Romania
- Education: University of Bucharest
- Spouse: Gabriela Kalinderu
- Scientific career
- Workplaces: Carol Davila University of Medicine and Pharmacy

Minister of Health and Social Assistance of Romania
- In office 4 November 1944 – 28 February 1945
- Prime Minister: Constantin Sănătescu; Nicolae Rădescu
- Preceded by: Nicolae Marinescu
- Succeeded by: Dumitru Bagdasar

Daniel Danielopolu (12 April 1884 – 29 April 1955) was a Romanian physiologist, clinician, and pharmacologist.

He was born in Bucharest, the son of a Law professor at the University of Bucharest. After attending the Saint Sava High School, he enrolled in 1900 in the Faculty of Medicine of the University of Bucharest, graduating with a doctoral degree in 1910. During World War I, he ran a hospital for the treatment of patients with epidemic typhus. In 1918, he was named professor at the Faculty of Medicine, a position he would hold until his death. In 1938, he was elected an honorary member of the Romanian Academy. He served as Minister of Health and Social Assistance in the Sănătescu and Rădescu cabinets from 4 November 1944 to 28 February 1945.

Danielopolu was married to Gabriela, née Kalinderu. He died in Bucharest at age 71, and was buried in the tomb of the Ioan Kalinderu family at Bellu Cemetery. A street in Sector 1 of Bucharest is named after him.
