= Bebe Brătianu =

Romanian politician (b.1887, d. 195X)

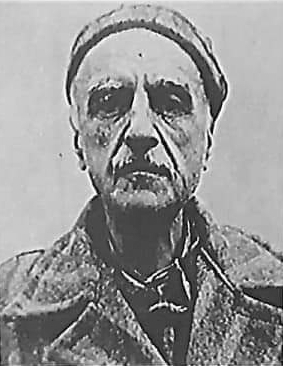
Constantin "Bebe" Brătianu (1950)

Constantin Constantin Ion Brătianu (born May 20, 1887 in Bucharest, Romania; died 1955 or January 21, 1956), also known as "Bebe" (this means "Baby") was a liberal Romanian politician.

Constantin was the son of general Constantin Ion Brătianu (1844–1910), who was the son of former prime minister Dumitru Brătianu. Constantin Brătianu became a Doctor of Law and worked for the National Bank of Romania. In 1938, he became General Secretary of the National Liberal Party (PNL) which was led by Dinu Brătianu. Together with Dinu he tried to keep the splintered party intact during the dictatorships of King Carol II and Conducător Ion Antonescu. During World War II, after Antonescu was overthrown, Constantin Brătianu acted as Minister of Armaments and War Production in the military transitional governments of Constantin Sănătescu and Nicolae Rădescu from November 1944 until February 1945.

During Paris Peace Conference of 1946, when Rădescu's successor Petru Groza had been urged by the US and UK to include opposition representatives in his communist-dominated government, Constantin Brătianu was briefly in discussion again and supported even by Ana Pauker. However, he was rejected by the other Communists and the Soviet Union. After the Brătianu faction of the National Liberal Party was forced to cease activity in 1947, Constantin Brătianu was arrested in 1948 or 1950 and imprisoned in Sighet Prison. Shortly after his release he died in Bucharest's Colțea Hospital.

== See also ==
- Brătianu family
