= Battle of Târgu Frumos =

The Battle of Târgu Frumos, also known as the Târgu Frumos Operation, occurred during Spring 1944 in World War II in and around the town of Târgu Frumos in Iași County, Moldavia, Romania.

It was fought between Soviet forces (the Red Army) and Axis forces (the German Wehrmacht and Romanian forces) and, according to David Glantz, it was within the Soviet Union's First Jassy-Kishinev Offensive. The same historian had earlier concluded that the battle was instead a successful example of Soviet maskirovka, meant to trick the Germans into believing the region continued to be in their strategic interest after the end of the Uman–Botoșani Offensive.

The term may apply to either to the entire scope of conflict in the area over a longer time, but often refers specifically to the battle in May. For example, a military unit or an individual can be said to have served in the battle.

- First Battle of Târgu Frumos, 9–12 April 1944: the Red Army took the town but was pushed out.
- Second Battle of Târgu Frumos, 2–8 May 1944: the German forces held again.

Soviet historians did not consider this to be a significant battle but have come around to identifying it separately.

The battle in May has been used in military education as an example of how a mobile defense can defeat an armoured spearhead.
