= Eftimiu =

Eftimiu is a Romanian surname and may refer to:

- Constantin Eftimiu (1893–1950), Romanian general during World War II
- Victor Eftimiu (1889–1972), Romanian poet and playwright
