= Rădescu cabinet =

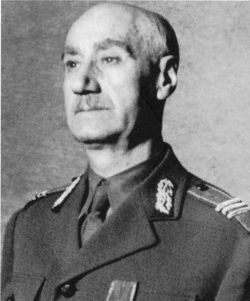
Nicolae Rădescu

The Rădescu cabinet was the government of Romania from 6 December 1944 to 28 February 1945. It was the last non-Communist government of Romania until the Romanian Revolution.

== Composition ==
The ministers of the cabinet were as follows:

- President of the Council of Ministers:

- Gen. Nicolae Rădescu (6 December 1944 – 28 February 1945)

- Vice President of the Council of Ministers:

- Petru Groza (6 December 1944 – 28 February 1945)

- Minister of Internal Affairs:

- (interim) Gen. Nicolae Rădescu (6 – 14 December 1944)
- Gen. Nicolae Rădescu (14 December 1944 – 28 February 1945)

- Minister of Foreign Affairs:

- Constantin Vișoianu (6 December 1944 – 28 February 1945)

- Minister of Finance:

- Mihail Romniceanu (6 December 1944 – 28 February 1945)

- Minister of Justice:

- Lucrețiu Pătrășcanu (6 December 1944 – 28 February 1945)

- Minister of National Education:

- Ștefan Voitec (6 December 1944 – 28 February 1945)

- Minister of Religious Affairs and the Arts:

- Ghiță Popp (6 December 1944 – 28 February 1945)

- Minister of War:

- Gen. Ion Negulescu (6 December 1944 – 28 February 1945)

- Minister of War Production:

- Constantin (Bebe) Brătianu (6 December 1944 – 28 February 1945)

- Minister of Agriculture and Property

- Ioan Hudiță (6 December 1944 – 28 February 1945)

- Minister of National Economy:

- Aurel Leucuția (6 December 1944 – 28 February 1945)

- Minister of Communications:

- Gheorghe Gheorghiu-Dej (6 December 1944 – 28 February 1945)

- Minister of Public Works and Recovery:

- Virgil Solomon (6 December 1944 – 28 February 1945)

- Minister of Cooperation:

- George Fotino (6 December 1944 – 28 February 1945)

- Minister of Labour:

- Lothar Rădăceanu (6 December 1944 – 28 February 1945)

- Minister of Social Insurance:

- Gheorghe Nicolau (6 December 1944 – 28 February 1945)

- Minister of Health and Social Assistance:

- Daniel Danielopolu (6 December 1944 – 28 February 1945)

- Minister of Minority Nationalities:

- Gheorghe Vlădescu-Răcoasa (6 December 1944 – 28 February 1945)

Preceded by Second Sănătescu cabinet	Cabinet of Romania; 6 December 1944 - 28 February 1945	Succeeded by First Groza cabinet
