= Aurel Aldea =

Romanian general (1887–1949)

- Born: 18 March 1887; Slatina, Olt County, Kingdom of Romania
- Died: 17 October 1949 (aged 62); Aiud Prison, Aiud, Alba County, Romania
- Education: Higher War School

Minister of Internal Affairs
- In office 23 August 1944 – 3 November 1944
- Prime Minister: Constantin Sănătescu
- Preceded by: Dimitrie I. Popescu
- Succeeded by: Nicolae Penescu
- Military career
- Allegiance: Kingdom of Romania
- Branch: Army
- Service years: 1908–1945
- Rank: 2nd Lieutenant (1908); 1st Lieutenant (1911); Captain (1916); Major (1917); Lieutenant Colonel (1923); Colonel (1928); Brigadier General (1936); Major General (1940); Lieutenant General (1944)
- Commands: 4th Infantry Division
- Conflicts: Second Balkan War; World War I World War II
- Other work: Anti-communist resistance leader (1945–46)

Aurel Aldea (18 March 1887 – 17 October 1949) was a Romanian general, Interior Minister, and anti-communist resistance leader.

== Education ==
Aurel Aldea was born in Slatina, Olt County on 28 March 1887. He graduated from the Artillery and Engineering Military School of Iași, after which he was sent to Germany to the Preparatory School of Military Officers of Hanover (1907–1912) and to the Military Technical Academy of Charlottenburg, where he had his internship at the 23rd Artillery Regiment in Koblenz.

== Army career ==
In 1912, Aldea was recalled to Romania to participate in the Second Balkan War, and in 1913 he graduated from the Higher War School. He served in World War I as a battery commander, and participated in the battles from Dobrogea and Bucharest.

In the interwar period Aldea worked within the General Staff of the Romanian Armed Forces in the Transport Division and Historic Service, Head of Staff of the 11th Infantry Division and 1st Army Corps, then commander of the 23rd Artillery Regiment. Between 1935 and 1938 he was the commander of the Artillery Brigade, after which he was appointed Secretary General of the Ministry of Army Endowment and Commander of the 11th Infantry Division (autumn 1938) and 4th Infantry Division (April 1939).

== World War II ==
In June 1940, during the Soviet occupation of Bessarabia and northern Bukovina, Aldea led the Romanian delegation that discussed with Red Army commanders the evacuation plans from those territories. The next year, he entered into conflict with Marshal Ion Antonescu, and was forced into retirement on July 21, 1941.

In August 1944, the Soviet Army launched the Jassy–Kishinev Offensive and entered Romania. Aldea was instrumental in the coup d'état led by King Michael I, which resulted in the arrest of Antonescu and Romania switching allegiance from the Axis powers to the Allies. He then served as Interior Minister in the first Sănătescu cabinet from August 23 to November 3, 1944.

== Final years ==
Under the command of Aldea, elements of the Romanian army officer corps sought to form in 1945–46 a National Resistance Movement, in order to oversee the disparate anti-communist resistance groups and to organize an armed insurrection. He was arrested on May 27, 1946, and tried by the High Court of Cassation and Justice November 11–18, 1946, for his resistance efforts. The presiding judge was General Vasile Atanasiu; other judges included generals Mihail Lascăr, Ilie Crețulescu, and Constantin Argeșanu. He was found guilty of plotting against the State, and sentenced to life in prison. He died in Aiud Prison on October 17, 1949.

A street in his native city, Slatina, now bears his name, as do streets in Craiova and Drăgănești-Olt.
