= Battle of Podu Iloaiei =

Date	12 April 1944
Location	Podu Iloaiei, Iași County, Romania
Result	Disputed

Belligerents
Germany	Soviet Union

Commanders and leaders
(Nazi Germany) Maximilian von Edelsheim	(Soviet Union) Ivan Konev (Soviet Union) Semen Bogdanov

Strength
1 Panzer Division	2 Tank Corps; 2 Rifle Divisions

Casualties and losses
Unknown (Note: The total German Eighth Army casualties for the period between 8–23 April are reported by the Soviets as 60,000 and 20,000 were taken prisoners.)	Unknown

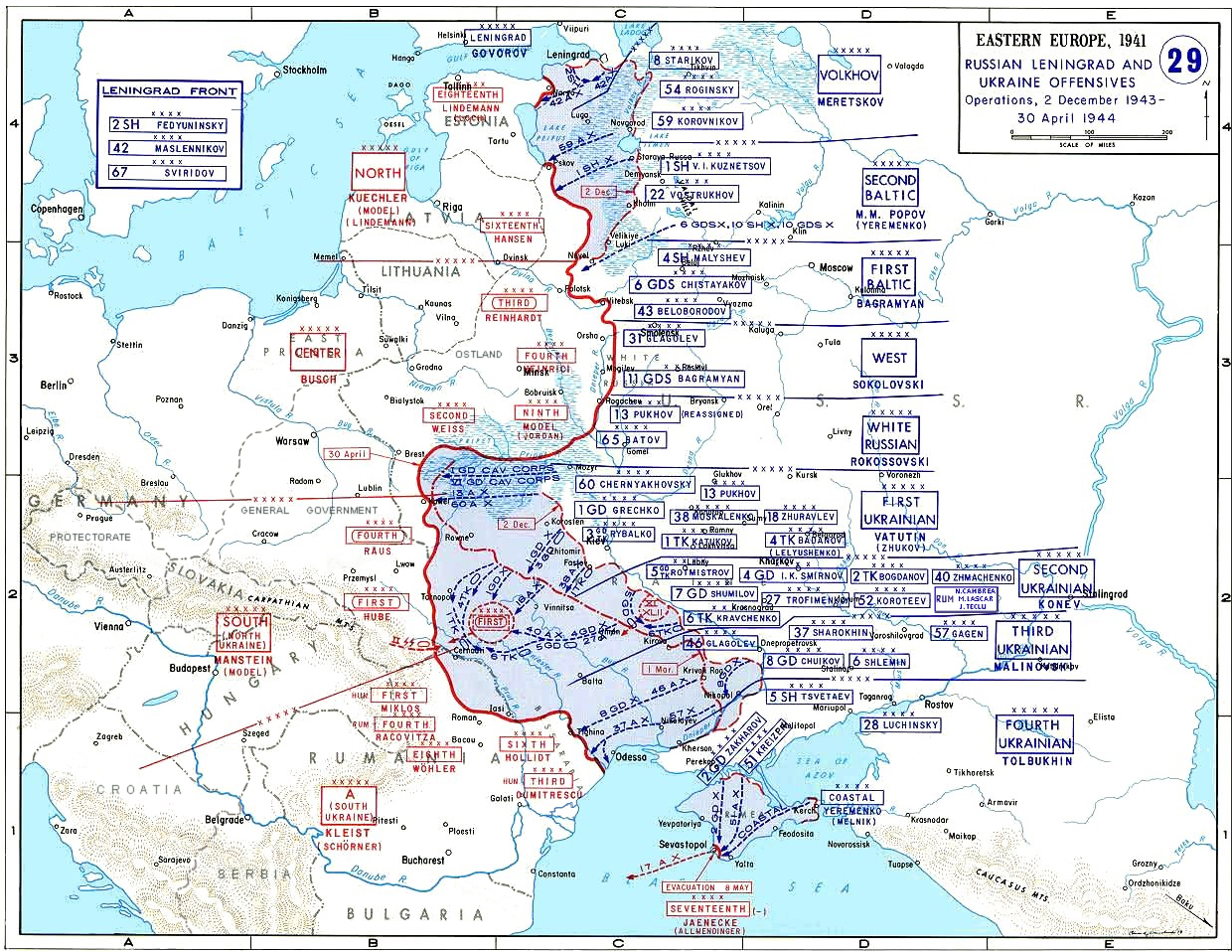
Soviet Advances from 2 December 1943 to 30 April 1944

The Battle of Podu Iloaiei was fought during World War II between the German Wehrmacht and the Soviet Red Army. Historian David Glantz described it as part of a failed Soviet offensive in Romania, and considered it a reaction to the Soviet defeat at the First Battle of Târgu Frumos. While according to the Soviet account, the Red Army successfully repelled a German counter-stroke, according to German accounts, the Germans managed to drive the attacking Soviets back to the positions they held before the battle.

== Aftermath ==
The region was still in Axis hands. Several months later, it was captured by the Red Army in the Jassy–Kishinev Offensive, from 21–23 August 1944.
