= Nicolae Penescu =

Romanian lawyer and politician

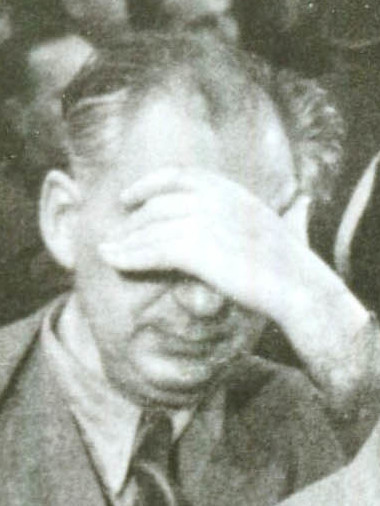
- Nicolae Penescu în 1947

Minister of Internal Affairs
- In office 3 November 1944 – 6 December 1944
- Prime Minister: Constantin Sănătescu
- Preceded by: Aurel Aldea
- Succeeded by: Constantin Sănătescu

Personal details
- Born: 28 February 1897 Pitești, Kingdom of Romania
- Died: 28 February 1981 (aged 84) Paris, France
- Cause of death: Injuries from package bomb
- Resting place: Père Lachaise Cemetery, Paris
- Party: National Peasants' Party (PNȚ)
- Relatives: Fulvia Petrescu (1906–1962)
- Education: University of Bucharest; University of Paris
- Occupation: Lawyer

Nicolae Penescu (28 February 1897 – 28 February 1981) was a Romanian lawyer and politician. A member of the National Peasants' Party (PNȚ), he was the interior minister from 4 November to 6 December 1944. After spending years in prison and internal exile, he emigrated to France, where he was active in denouncing the Communist regime.

== Biography ==
=== Early career and Interior Minister ===
Born in Pitești, he attended primary and secondary school in his native city, followed by the Law faculty of the University of Bucharest. Admitted to the bar in 1921, he received his legal doctorate from the University of Paris in 1923. As a practising lawyer, he mainly represented business interests. He began his political career by joining the National Peasants' Party. Active in the Argeș County area, he took advantage of a PNȚ legislator from the county leaving the party, and was himself elected to the Chamber of Deputies in 1937. He held positions at the Bucharest Chamber of Commerce (which backed his election as an independent senator in 1933) and Banca Commerciale Italiana (from 1942), and headed Creditul Românesc.

Named interior minister in the second Constantin Sănătescu cabinet, he fought against the imposition of communism and the transformation of Romania into a Soviet satellite, earning him sharp attacks from the Romanian Communist Party. His subordinates at the ministry included Teohari Georgescu, undersecretary for administration, and General Virgil Stănescu who, with Dimitrie Nistor, was in charge of the Siguranța secret police. The day after the cabinet took office, dissent began to surface among the participating parties, against a backdrop of Soviet occupation and the Romanian Army fighting in World War II to the west. The parties disagreed on what the government should do, and particularly on how to solve domestic political problems. Thus, although the cabinet meeting of 20 November had agreed "in full solidarity" to replace incumbent prefects and had decided to let the county-level chapters of the respective parties select replacements, Penescu did not adhere to the agreement. Several communist prefects took office by force and without interior ministry approval, which added to the tensions created by the war.

Meanwhile, communists staged demonstrations against the new minister, instructing protesters to chant "Down with Penescu". The party also began a virulent press campaign directed against him. Penescu also decided to hold commune-level elections, thought to be impossible as long as disagreement over the prefects continued. The government's repressive measures in response to popular demands hampered its ability to act, so that prefects and mayors were soon installed without ministry authorization in Arad, Brăila, Brașov, Târgoviște, Hunedoara, Ploiești, Timișoara and Lugoj, with nearly all office holders replaced by the end of November. An attempt to use force backfired, leading to the cabinet's fall on 2 December and its resignation four days later. Nicolae Rădescu was the next prime minister as well as interim interior minister.

During Penescu's time at the ministry, the first groups of exiled Iron Guard members were being parachuted in from Nazi Germany, with several hundred landings by the following February. Domestically, the security situation was uncertain, with agents working for the ministry informing on those being watched when they joined political parties, as well as on the disorder caused by the Soviet occupiers. The first stirrings of the Romanian anti-communist resistance movement began to appear. In December 1944, Penescu was elected secretary general of the PNȚ, replacing Ghiță Popp. In August 1946, he was seriously wounded in an assassination attempt at the Pitești tribunal that left two dead and sixteen injured, and Soviet pressures for the PNȚ and other historic parties to be dissolved were growing.

=== Persecution and emigration ===
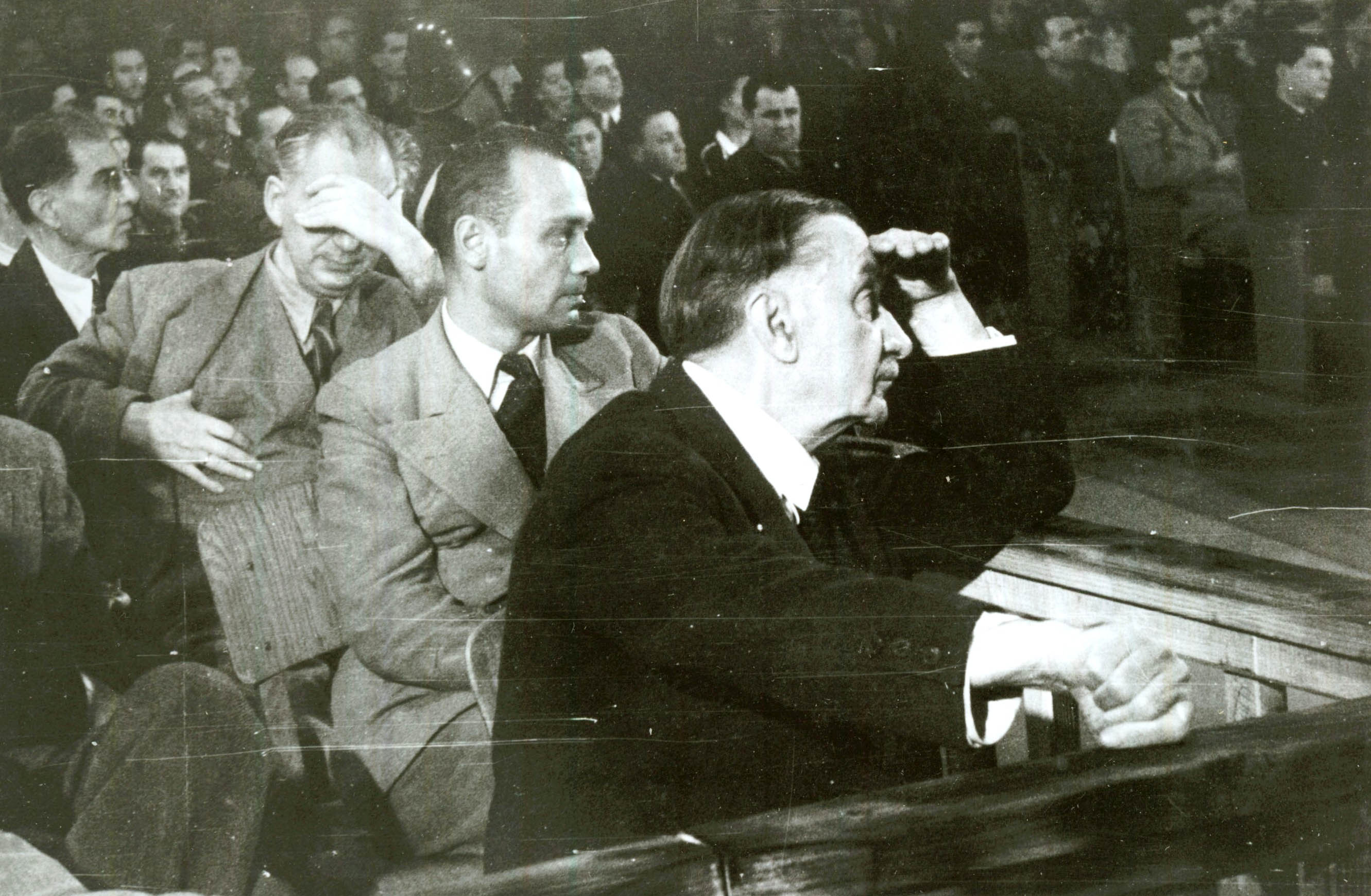
Penescu, shielding his face, at trial. Maniu is in the foreground, in dark suit.

With difficulty, Iuliu Maniu persuaded him to leave the country and continue the PNȚ's political struggle from abroad. He was arrested together with other PNȚ leaders as well as his wife on 14 July 1947, while boarding an airplane, as part of the Tămădău Affair. Put on trial, he was accused of intending to set up a rival government abroad; of plotting with Maniu and Ion Mihalache to bring about the violent overthrow of the government, aided by American and British "imperialist circles"; and of writing "calumnious" and misleading memoirs that were sent to the ambassadors of those two countries. Under pressure, he made statements partly disassociating himself from Maniu, calling him a "gloved dictator", and this collaboration allowed his wife, Fulvia, to be freed sooner, after three months of detention. He was sentenced to five years' imprisonment and two years' deprivation of civic rights.

Sent to prison in Craiova with other detainees who had issued denunciations, he was subsequently held at the notorious Sighet Prison. He was brought back to Bucharest during the investigation of Lucrețiu Pătrășcanu and used as a prosecution witness against him. During the investigation, he and Nicolae Carandino were re-sentenced, with Penescu receiving an 8-year term. Released from prison in 1955 but forced to reside in the Bărăgan, he was provided for by his son. In 1959, following an order calling for detainees who were freed or sent into forced residence to be rearrested, he was given a show trial and a 15-year sentence. His son and a driver were also jailed for bringing him winter supplies. This time he was sent to Jilava Prison where, in 1962, he received news of his wife's death. In 1963, his "re-education" began when he was taken to Bucharest and Ploiești to witness the regime's "achievements". The following year he began, under orders, to write a self-critical memoir but was convinced by fellow inmates to drop the effort. He was freed in late July 1964.

In 1968, when the French president, Charles de Gaulle, visited Romania, one of the delegation members was the country's prime minister, Maurice Couve de Murville, whose doctoral colleague Penescu had been in Paris. The prime minister intervened on his behalf and Penescu received approval to visit France for six months. During his stay, he asked for asylum and did not return to Romania.

=== Exile activities and death ===
Once in France, he denounced those Romanians and Soviets he deemed responsible for his country's predicament. He founded a Romanian National Council in 1978, although his activities were undermined by rivals within the exile community. The Securitate secret police pressured his son Vladimir to visit him accompanied by one of their colonels, and the French authorities advised him to accept the visit and inform them of the Securitate's wishes. The agent asked Penescu to launch a campaign underlining the historic basis for Romania's claim to Transylvania and the purported risk of Hungary retaking the province. He refused, saying this would have abetted Ceaușescu's regime. Under continued surveillance from Romania, he kept up his campaigns, for instance going to Madrid for the 1980 CSCE conference and handing delegates a document detailing his country's internal situation. He also worked to rebuild the PNȚ in exile.

On 3 February 1981, he opened a package labeled as containing the memoirs of Nikita Khrushchev. The explosive inside seriously wounded him when he opened it, and he died of complications from his injuries in a Paris hospital at the end of that month. Nicolae Pleșiță, a general in the Securitate, was linked to the bomb; another one was sent the same day to the dissident writer Paul Goma, who called the police instead of opening it. Penescu was buried at Père Lachaise Cemetery.

== Bibliography ==
- Nicolae Penescu (1932), Marxism și țărănism (in Romanian)
- Nicolae Penescu; Ion Rațiu (1974–1976), A.C.A.R.D.A.: Inițiativa Penescu (in Romanian), London, OCLC 1016473992
- Nicolae Penescu (1980), Testamentul lui Maniu (in Romanian), OCLC 495350573
- Nicolae Penescu (1981). La Roumanie: de la démocratie au totalitarisme 1938–1948 (in French). Paris: Contrepoint. OCLC 417557049.
