= Second Battle of Târgu Frumos =

Military engagement in 1944

Battle of Târgu Frumos
- Part of Soviet-German War, World War II
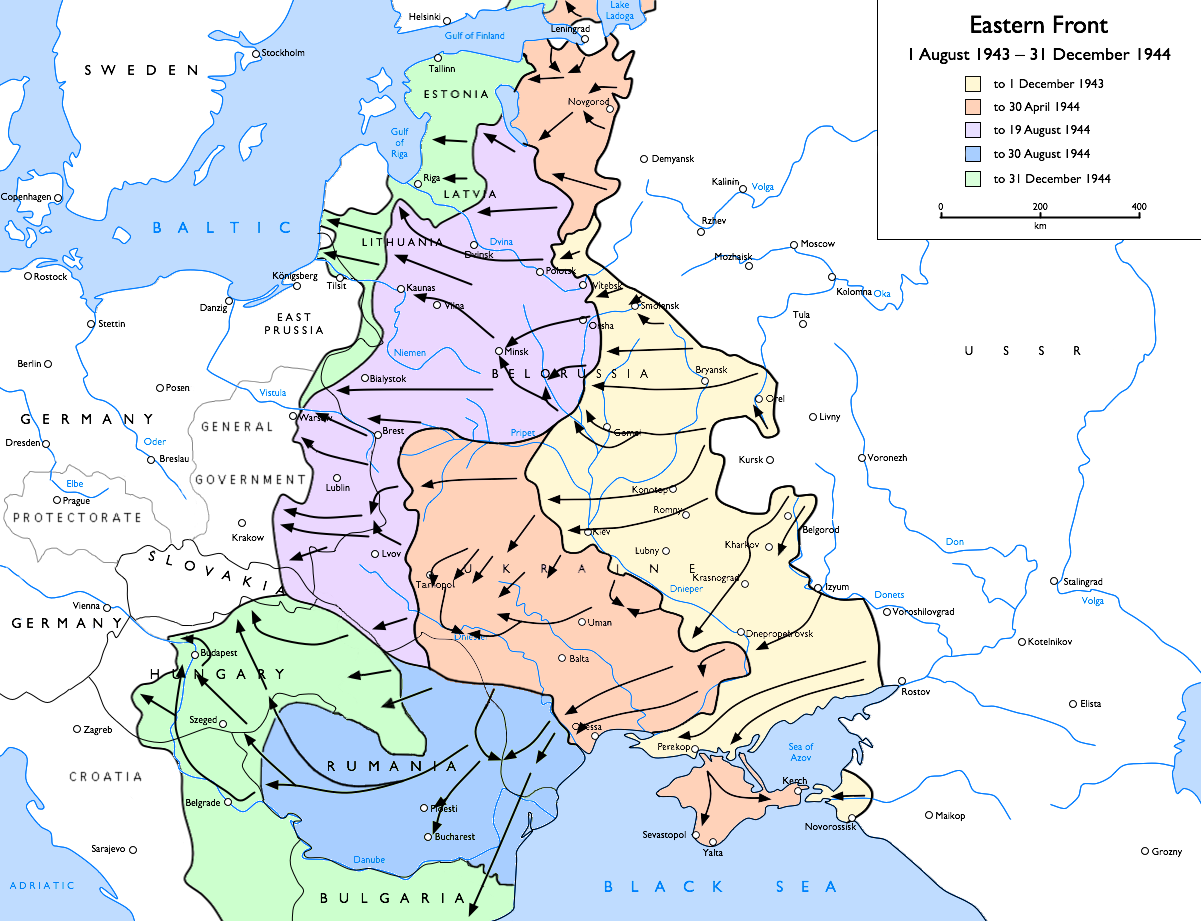
- Advance of the Red Army 1943 - 1944
| Date | 2–8 May 1944 |
| Location | Eastern Romania |
| Result | Axis victory |

Belligerents
| Germany; Romania | Soviet Union |

Commanders and leaders
| (Nazi Germany) Ferdinand Schoerner (Kingdom of Romania) Mihai Racoviță | (Soviet Union) Ivan Konev |

Units involved
| (Nazi Germany) 8th Army (Kingdom of Romania) 4th Army | Main Shock Group: (Soviet Union) 2nd Tank Army; (Soviet Union) 27th Army; (Soviet Union) 40th Army; Northern Shock Group: (Soviet Union) 6th Tank Army; (Soviet Union) 52nd Army |

Casualties and losses
| Unknown | Unknown |

The Second Battle of Târgu Frumos was a military engagement primarily between the Wehrmacht and Red Army forces in May 1944, near Iași, Romania. The battle was the main engagement of the Târgu Frumos Operation, and is often referred simply as the Battle of Târgu Frumos.

Military historian David Glantz claims the battle was part of the First Jassy-Kishinev Offensive, which resulted from a Stavka order to the forces of the 2nd & 3rd Ukrainian Fronts to commence a coordinated invasion of Romania. The offensive was directed towards Iași, with a secondary objective of establishing bridgeheads across the Prut River.

The battle of Târgu-Frumos was only briefly described by Soviet historians. Recently, Russian historians have begun describing this as a distinct battle. For example, the four volume Great Patriotic War (1998) prepared for the Russian Federation states:

Thus, during the Târgu-Frumos operation, the 2nd Ukrainian Front's forces tried unsuccessfully to complete a deep penetration of the enemy's defense and reach the territory between the Prut & Siret Rivers. By order of the Stavka, they themselves went over to the defensive along existing lines on 6 May.... The several attempts by the 3rd Ukrainian Front's armies to conduct attacks from their Dnestr bridgeheads & seize new bridgeheads also led to nothing.

According to accounts by Hasso von Manteuffel, one of the two German division commanders, and Ferdinand Maria von Senger und Etterlin, the German forces defeated a Soviet offensive by the 2nd Ukrainian Front that was expected to be a precursor of a much larger offensive in Northern Ukraine. The battle of Târgu Frumos has been used as a case study in officer tactical education in the United States Army and other armies, teaching how a mobile defense can defeat an armoured spearhead. There are however questions about the accounts by the two German officers, relating to the failure to include Romanian forces into their account.

== Prelude ==
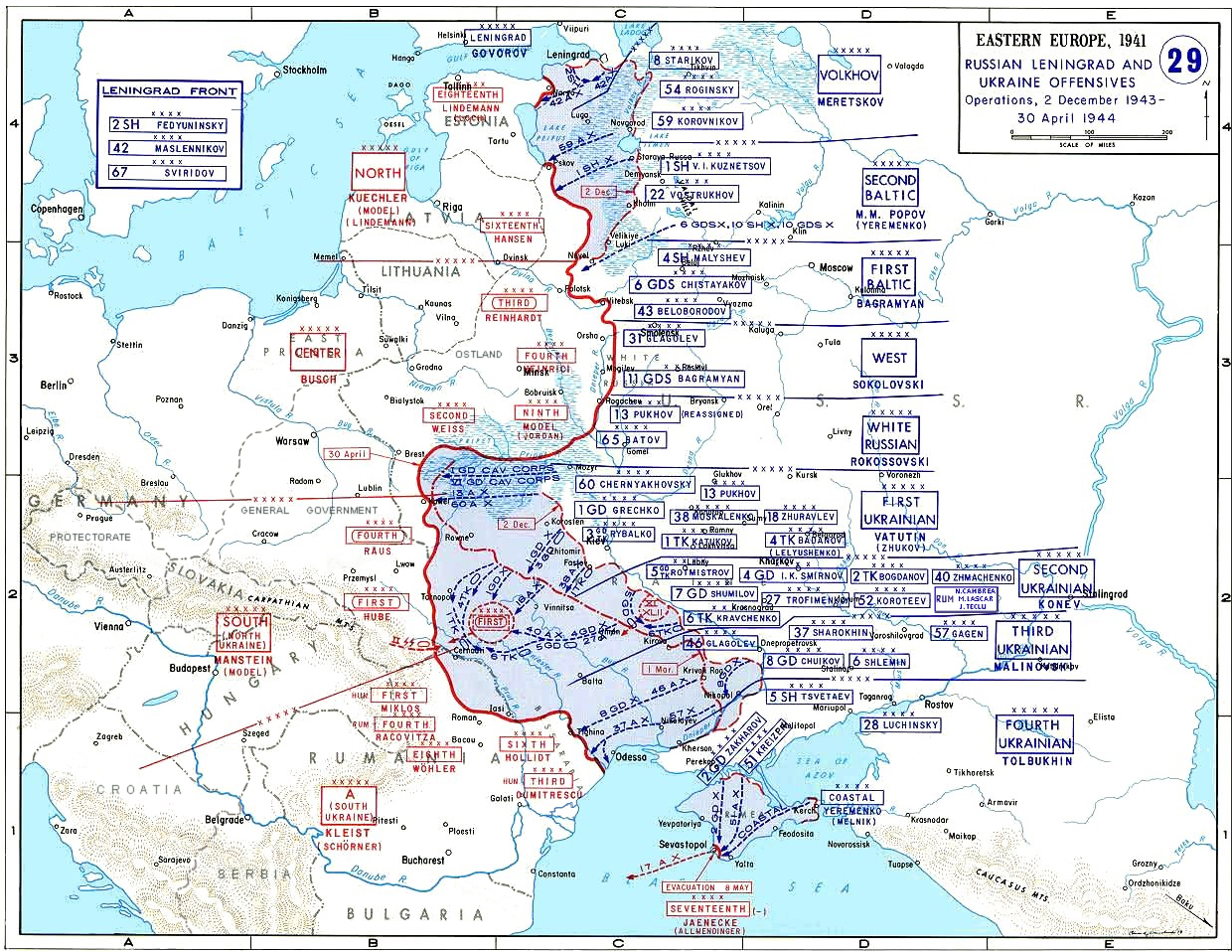
Eastern front in April 1944

During April 1944 a series of offensives by the Red Army, including in the Iași sector, was intended to deceive OKH as to the real time and place of the major offensive planned in Belorussia. The German-Romanian forces successfully defended against the local limited objective attacks throughout the month of April. The attack aiming at Târgu Frumos was the initial attempt by the Red Army to achieve its goal of deceiving the OKH, and testing the Axis defenses in Romania while preventing movement of reserves to the Belorussian sector of the Eastern Front.

It had been thought that May Day, the traditional workers' day of celebration, would see the opening of a new assault by the Soviet forces. But the offensive re-opened on 2 May heralding three shattering and unceasing days and nights of combat. Behind a sixty-minute drum fire at dawn, two Soviet armies moved into an attack.

== The battle ==
The battle of Târgu Frumos was a series of engagements and smaller combats over several days during which armoured forces of the Wehrmacht LVII Panzer Corps, in particular of the Grossdeutschland Division and 24th Panzer Division, engaged the Red Army's 16th Tank Corps of the 2nd Tank Army, which was also attacking from the north.

One unit's experience in the opening hours of the battle was described as such:

(1st Battalion), P(an)z(er)Gr(enadier) R(e)g(imen)t G(ross)D(eutschland) and its Romanian allies occupied a well wired-in and T-Mine-strewn line running to the right of 3. SS-Pz.Div. "Totenkopf's" positions. The Soviets advanced in great waves, their tanks and infantry mixed together. Moving much faster than the Germans had anticipated, they overwhelmed...(the 1st Company), wiping it out to the last man. While (the) temporary battalion commander...attempted to halt and repulse the Soviets with what was left of his battalion, the Romanians to the left of (the 2nd Company) cowered in their trenches like "herrings", as (the) company commander...later recounted. Indeed, the Romanians seemed to have reached an unofficial cease fire with the enemy. That night the Luftwaffe succeeded in mounting an air strike in the enemy rear area, to no avail. The next morning the Soviets resumed their attack, preceding it with a bombardment of phosphorus shells. Over 100 enemy tanks and assault guns advanced against (the 3rd Platoon). With his Romanian artillery remaining inactive, (the 3rd Platoon of the 2nd Company) could count only on the support of three...(assault guns) and the four 15cm Nebelwerfer multiple rocket launchers of (the 10th Company, Panzer Artillery Regiment Grossdeutschland). (The 2nd Company) was soon back to the Nebelwerfer's position where it formed a 'hedgehog' defense...and a handful of...men then managed to gain the temporary safety of the railway embankment in their rear. His battalion scattered, (the 1st Battalion commander) sent (the 2nd Company commander) with four SPWs to cover the wide open left flank, completely vulnerable when the Romanians abandoned their positions. Although the enemy had not made any deep penetrations, the tension of the past two days had exhausted the Panzergrenadiers. "Suddenly...four T-34s were in among the SPWs when, as if by magic, tanks and assault guns of the SS-Division "Totenkopf" appeared. Before a single T-34 could train its gun, all had received direct hits." Immediately thereafter Oberst Hans-Ulrich Rudel's Ju 87 Stukas led off a counter thrust by "Totenkopf's" Panzerregiment, accompanied by...four SPWs. The Panzergrenadiers took a measure of revenge for what they had endured over the past 48 hours...before being pulled out of the line to regroup and refit.

Despite initial successes of the Soviet attack, a series of counter-attacks managed to halt the Soviet offensive. The battle reduced Soviet tank strength to a point where a continued attack into Romania was not possible. In the three days of fighting, the Wehrmacht LVII Panzer Corps (mainly Grossdeutschland and 24th Panzer Division) and LII Army Corps defeated the Soviet force and claimed the destruction of over 350 Soviet tanks, ca. 100 of these claimed by 24th Panzer Division. During the battle, Hasso von Manteuffel, commander of the Grossdeutschland division, first encountered the new Soviet Stalin tank, "It was at Târgu Frumos that I first met the Stalin tanks. It was a shock to find that, although my Tigers began to hit them at a range of 3,000 metres, our shells bounced off, and did not penetrate them until we had closed to half that distance. But I was able to counter the Russians' superiority by manoeuvre and mobility, in making the best use of ground cover." Manteuffel also noted that the Stalin tanks had several "disadvantages: slow, not manoeuvrable enough; as well, in my opinion their crews were not sufficiently familiar with the tank."

== Historiography ==
Soviet sources make few references to the battle. Historian David Glantz has found some mention of operations in Romania in April and May 1944 in divisional histories. The main source for him is the Soviet 2d Tank Army's history, where a direct reference to the battle is found. It states that in late March 1944, the tank army was shifted into the sector of 27th Army with the mission of "attacking in the direction of Focuri and Podu Iloaiei. Subsequently, the army was to strike a blow toward the city of Iași and secure it."

In the narrative on follow-on operations by the Tank Army it is stated that it attacked together with 27th Army’s 35th Rifle Corps. It also claims that the 3rd Tank Corps reached Târgu Frumos, but was repulsed by the German counterattacks. The 16th Tank Corps identified by the German officers appears not to be mentioned in the account.

Despite German claims that the Soviet attack was a full-fledged offensive, it appears now that the battle of Târgu Frumos was a relatively small-scale operation in the context of 1944's fighting on the Eastern Front, even though a Soviet success would have put the Red Army into a much stronger position for its eventual attack into Romania. (Note: Historians are thus left with the question of whether the Soviet offensive was a major effort to penetrate into Romania or simply a local assault to improve the Soviet operational posture and opportunities for a renewed offensive in the future. The Germans maintain it was the former. This author has argued that it was the latter and was also associated with deception planning for future operations in Belorussia (to fix the future presence of 2nd Tank Army in Romania, while it was shortly moved elsewhere). Only further release of Soviet archival materials will settle this long-standing debate.)

== Aftermath ==
At the end of the Battle of Târgu Frumos the frontline stabilised. It was from these positions that the Soviets launched the successful Jassy–Kishinev Offensive in late August 1944.

On a political level, the battle accelerated the activities of anti-German forces in Romania, leading to negotiations between the traditional political parties and the Romanian Communist Party, represented by Lucrețiu Pătrășcanu.

== Formations involved ==
=== Soviet ===
- 2nd Ukrainian Front (Ivan Konev)
  - Main Shock Group (Târgu Frumos Axis)
  - 27th Army (Sergei Trofimenko)
    - 35th Guards Rifle Corps
      - 3rd Guards Airborne Division
      - 93rd Guards Rifle Division
      - 202nd Rifle Division
      - 206th Rifle Division
    - 33rd Rifle Corps
      - 78th Rifle Division
      - 180th Rifle Division
      - 337th Rifle Division
  - 40th Army (Filipp Zhmachenko)
    - 50th Rifle Corps
      - 4th Guards Rifle Division
      - 133rd Rifle Division
      - 163rd Rifle Division
    - 51st Rifle Corps
      - 42nd Guards Rifle Division
      - 74th Rifle Division
      - 232nd Rifle Division
    - 104th Rifle Corps
      - 38th Rifle Division
      - 240th Rifle Division
  - 2nd Tank Army (Semyon Bogdanov)
    - 3rd Tank Corps (50 Tanks)
      - 50th Tank Brigade
      - 51st Tank Brigade
      - 103rd Tank Brigade
      - 57th Motorized Rifle Brigade
    - 16th Tank Corps (55 Tanks)
      - 107th Tank Brigade
      - 109th Tank Brigade
      - 164th Tank Brigade
      - 154th Motorized Rifle Brigade
    - 11th Guards Tank Brigade (16 Tanks)
    - 8th Guards Separate Tank Regiment
    - 13th Guards Separate Tank Regiment
  - Northern Shock Group (N of Iasi) Secondary Operations
  - 52nd Army (Konstantin Koroteyev)
    - 78th Rifle Corps
      - 252nd Rifle Division
      - 303rd Rifle Division
      - 373rd Rifle Division
    - 73rd Rifle Corps
      - 31st Rifle Division
      - 254th Rifle Division
      - 294th Rifle Division
    - 116th Rifle Division (Army Reserve)
  - 6th Tank Army (Andrei Kravchenko)
    - 5th Mechanised Corps (20-30 Tanks)
    - 5th Guards Tank Corps

=== German ===
- Army Group South Ukraine (Ferdinand Schörner)
  - 8th Army (Otto Wöhler)
    - LVII Panzer Corps (Friedrich Kirchner)
      - Grossdeutschland Division
      - 23rd Panzer Division
      - Battle group of 3rd SS Panzer Division Totenkopf
    - IV Armeecorps (Group Mieth) (Friedrich Mieth)
      - 46th Infantry Division (Wehrmacht)
      - 24th Panzer Division (Army Reserve)

=== Romanian ===
- 4th Romanian Army (Ioan Mihail Racoviță)
  - I Romanian Army Corps
    - 8th Infantry Division
    - 6th Infantry Division
  - IV Romanian Army Corps
    - 7th Infantry Division
    - 1st Guards Division
    - 18th Mountain Division
    - 3rd Infantry Division
- 1st Air Corps (Emanoil Ionescu)
  - 5th Bomber Group
  - 8th Assault Group (flying German Hs 129 ground attack planes)
  - 9th Fighter Group
