= First Battle of Târgu Frumos =

1944 World War II battle

- Part of First Jassy-Kishinev Offensive (according to David Glantz); World War II
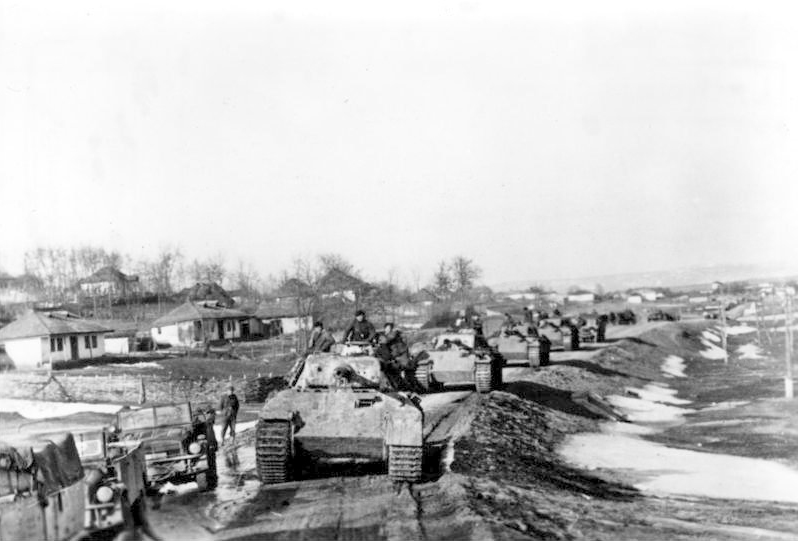
- Vehicles and Panther tanks of the Großdeutschland division operating in Romania – April 1944.
Date	9–12 April 1944
Location	Eastern Romania 47°13′52″N 27°00′02″E
Result	Axis victory

Belligerents
Germany; Romania	Soviet Union

Commanders and leaders
Otto Wöhler; Hasso von Manteuffel; Ioan Mihail Racoviță	Ivan Konev; Semyon Bogdanov; Filipp Zhmachenko; Sergei Trofimenko

Strength
1 Panzergrenadier Division; 2 Armoured Divisions; 3 Infantry Divisions; 4 Divisions	14 Rifle Divisions; 1 Airborne Division; elements of a Tank army

Casualties and losses
Unknown (Note: Soviet estimates of German Eighth Army casualties for the period between 8–23 April were 60,000 losses, with 20,000 captured. Glantz, p. 102)	Unknown

The First Battle of Târgu Frumos was fought during World War II between Axis powers commanded by Otto Wöhler and Soviet forces led by Ivan Konev. Historian David Glantz has described it as part of a failed Soviet invasion of Romania, while Russian and German sources have described it as part of the Târgu Frumos Operation.

David Glantz claims that by early April 1944, Stavka (the Main Command of the Soviet Armed Forces) ordered its two major units involved in operations in south-western Ukraine to mount a strategic offensive in north-eastern Romania. General Konev's 2nd Ukrainian Front approached Târgu Frumos and Botoșani regions by 5 April and commenced its offensive towards Târgu Frumos on 8 April. The Romanian 4th Army, under the command of Lieutenant-General Ioan Mihail Racoviță, was charged with the defense of the region. It was being reinforced by German panzer elements of the 24th Panzer Division, and was preparing to hold an initial Soviet advance. However, these defenses proved to be no match for the Soviet assault on the town and by the next day Târgu Frumos had been secured by two 27th Army rifle divisions. Meanwhile, the German Eighth Army command responded rapidly by ordering Hasso von Manteuffel's Großdeutschland Panzergrenadier division to move towards Târgu Frumos and recapture the town. By the evening of 10 April, 48 hours after receiving the initial order, Großdeutschland succeeded in retaking the town and establishing new defensive positions there. Sporadic battles with Soviet elements remaining in the region continued until 12 April, as they were facing the danger of encirclement.

Following the end of the battle, the Germans formed a new defensive line northwest and northeast of the town and maintained a tank regiment as reserve near Târgu Frumos proper. Meanwhile, irked by the defeat suffered at Târgu Frumos, Konev ordered the 2nd Tank Army to commence on 12 April an offensive towards the village of Podu Iloaiei.

== Background ==
On 5 March 1944, Colonel General Ivan Konev, commander of the 2nd Ukrainian Front, commenced the Uman–Botoșani Offensive operation in Ukraine. This operation succeeded in separating the 1st Panzer Army (Army Group North Ukraine) from the 8th Army (Otto Wöhler) in Army Group South Ukraine by 17 March; by early April Soviet units approached the Romanian border.

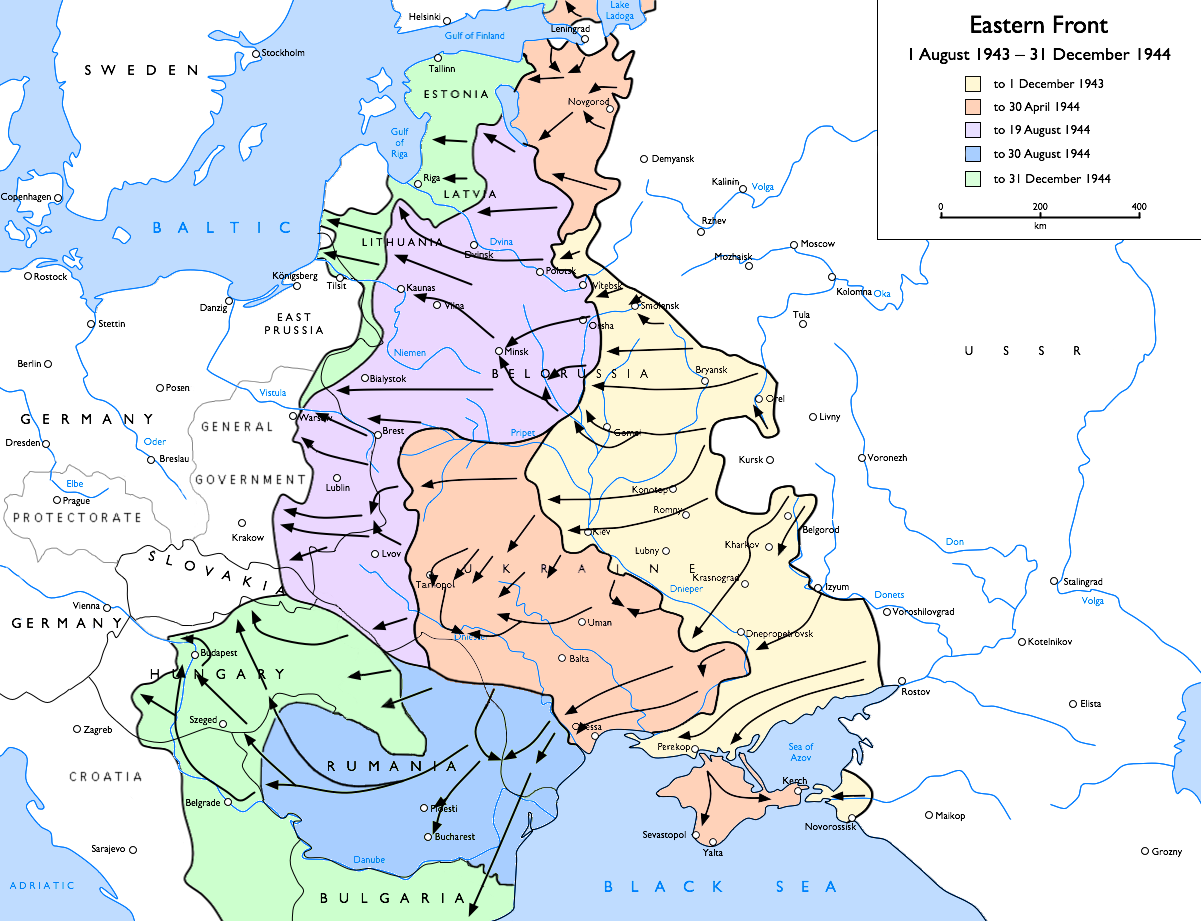
Advance of the Red Army 1943–1944.

Glantz claims that starting with early April 1944, Stavka ordered the 2nd and 3rd Ukrainian Fronts to mount a major offensive with strategic implications in eastern Romania. In Glantz's view, Stavka's strategic intentions were to break German and Romanian strategic defenses in northeastern Romania, capture the key cities of Iași and Chișinău, and afterwards project forces deep into Romanian territory, if possible as deep as Ploiești and Bucharest. By 5 April, Konev's front had crossed the upper reaches of Dniester and Prut Rivers, captured Hotin and Dorohoi, and approached Târgu Frumos and Botoșani regions—30 miles (48 km)–60 miles (97 km) northwest of Iași—facing only light Romanian resistance. On 8 April 1944, Konev ordered the 27th and 40th Armies to conduct a coordinated offensive southward along the Târgu Frumos axis, in close cooperation with Semyon Bogdanov's 2nd Tank Army. While Konev's shock group was advancing towards Târgu Frumos, Konstantin Koroteev's 52nd Army and elements of Andrei Kravchenko's 6th Tank Army, which were operating north of Iași, were conducting operations alongside the Iași axis in order to support Konev's main effort.

As Konev's armies prepared to launch their offensive toward Târgu Frumos, the Eighth Army was involved in the fighting taking place in and around the village of Popricani, 9 miles (14 km) north of Iași, where two Soviet corps were fighting with armored Kampfgruppen, distracting German attention and forces away from the critical Târgu Frumos sector. Exploiting the 52nd Army diversionary operations in the Iași region, the three armies of Konev's shock group began advancing southwards early in the morning of 8 April. The advance was quite slow due to mud-clogged roads during the rasputitsa, as well as crossing to the west bank of the Prut River northwest of Iași.

=== Planning ===
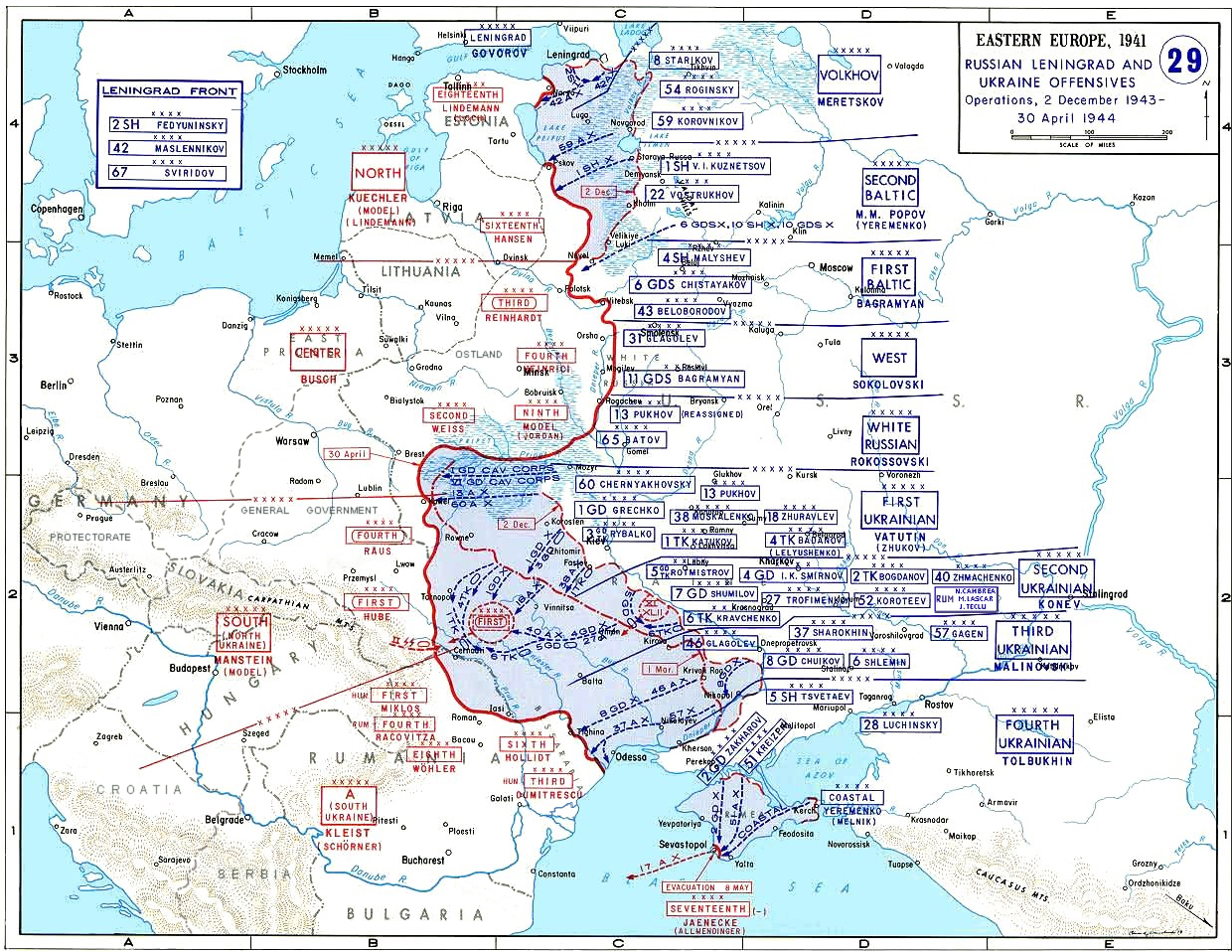
Eastern Front by 30 April 1944

Glantz claims Konev's armies' initial mission was to reach Târgu Frumos, Pașcani, and Târgu Neamț regions 30 miles (48 km)–60 miles (97 km) west of Iași and capture the three towns from their Romanian defenders by surprise. While three divisions of 51st Rifle Corps were ordered to press southward toward Pașcani, another two rifle divisions were protecting their advance in the region north and northwest of Târgu Neamț. Further to the east, seven rifle divisions assigned to 35th Guards and 33rd Rifle Corps of 27th Army would advance southeastward along the Prut starting on 7 April, forcing the Romanian 8th Infantry Division to retreat towards Hârlău, 17 miles (27 km) north of Târgu Frumos. Two divisions of 33rd Rifle Corps joined by two corps of the 2nd Tank Army would press the Romanian 7th Infantry Division back toward Târgu Frumos.

The Romanian IV Army Corps, 4th Army, which was responsible for defending the Târgu Frumos sector, was preparing to assemble sufficient forces to man the forward defensive positions in the Ruginoasa–Strunga–Oțeleni defense line, which extended from Târgu Neamț eastward south of Pașcani and through Târgu Frumos and Podu Iloaiei just south of Iași. The 6th and 8th Infantry Divisions would be manning defenses stretching from Târgu Neamț eastward to Pașcani, while the 1st Guards Division and the 7th Infantry Division would defend the sector from Pașcani eastward past Târgu Frumos to Podu Iloaiei. The latter units would be reinforced by the end of 8 April 9 miles (14 km) northeast of Podu Iloaiei by a small kampfgruppe of the 24th Panzer Division (Maximilian von Edelsheim).

== Battle ==
In the vanguard of Trofimenko's 27th Army, Lieutenant-General S. G. Goriachev's 35th Guards Rifle Corps resumed its advance southward from the Hârlău region towards Târgu Frumos during the morning on 9 April, with two rifle divisions deployed from left to right in his first echelon. Soviet riflemen quickly defeated the Romanian troops defending the town and most of the surrounding region, being reinforced by the Corps' second echelon consisting of one airborne and one rifle divisions before any enemy reaction. Meanwhile, the 42nd Guards Rifle Division captured the town of Pașcani, situated 14 miles (23 km) west of Târgu Frumos and defended by the Romanian 6th Infantry Division. At the same time, forward detachments of Bogdanov's 2nd Tank Army advancing east of the town attempted to reinforce Trofimenko's infantry fighting in the Târgu Frumos region, but were unable to do so due to German defenders. The German Eighth Army reacted promptly realizing the danger to its main defenses west of Iași, by moving Hasso von Manteuffel's Panzergrenadier Division Großdeutschland towards Târgu Frumos. Elements of the division were ordered to launch a counterattack from the south of the town as soon as possible. Attacking during the rest of the day, that small German force managed to seize and hold only a foothold in the southern part of the town. However, by this time two divisions of Goriachev's 35th Guards Rifle Corps reached the region and added their weight to Trofimenko's southward thrust. By nightfall, three divisions leading 35th Corps advance passed Târgu Frumos and established a salient 3 miles (4.8 km) to 7 miles (11 km) deep within the Romanian defense line south and southeast of the town.

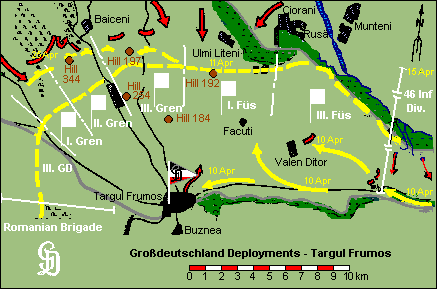
Großdeutschlands Division disposition during the First Battle of Târgu Frumos.

Early on 10 April, the Großdeutschland Division, consisting of approximately 160 tanks, including 40 Panthers and 40 Tigers, attacked westward along the road from Podu Iloaiei to Târgu Frumos in two columns deployed north and south of the road. Following a heavy bombardment, the Germans broke into the town and engaged the Soviet troops which had taken cover in houses and other buildings. The German thrust cut off a number of Soviet units from their main force and reached the high ground west of the town by launching a concerted counterattack just as the 206th Rifle, 3rd Guards Airborne and 93rd Guards Rifle Divisions were preparing to resume their assault southwards, at a time when only their rear guards and logistical subunits remained behind to defend the Târgu Frumos region. Meanwhile, the Romanian 1st Guard and 7th Infantry Division advanced from the south, pressing the Soviets back to the north. Trapped between the German armour racing into Târgu Frumos from the east and the Romanian infantry counterattacking from the south, the three divisions of 35th Guards Rifle Corps had no choice but to retreat. At about 2200 hours, 48 hours after getting their original order, the German grenadiers had secured Târgu Frumos and the regions west and north of the town.

After a desperate two-day struggle by three divisions of 35th Corps to avoid encirclement, the fighting in the Târgu Frumos region quieted down by midday on 12 April.

== Aftermath ==
After the end of the battle, the Großdeutschland Division erected a new defensive line to protect Târgu Frumos, which extended in a wide arc from 5 miles (8.0 km) northwest, 6 miles (9.7 km) northeast, and 9 miles (14 km) east of the town. Manteuffel ultimately placed the Großdeutschland Panzergrenadier Regiment on the divisional left wing northwest of the town and the Fusilier Regiment on its right wing northeast and east of the town, but he retained his Panzer Regiment in reserve assembly areas close to Târgu Frumos proper. Throughout 12 April, units from the Panzer Grenadier Regiment cleared Soviet remnants from the 206th Rifle and 3rd Guards Airborne Divisions from a small pocket west of the town and extended the regiment's defensive positions several miles forward southwestward of Heleșteni, 7 miles (11 km) west of Târgu Frumos, where the Großdeutschland defenses connected with those of the Romanian 1st Guards Division to form a continuous defensive front west of the town. On the right flank of the Großdeutschland' Division, a battlegroup from the 24th Panzer Division continued defending the sector located from north of Podu Iloaiei to the village of Lețcani, 10 miles (16 km) west of Iași, where its right flank joined with the defenses of the 7th Romanian Infantry Division, which was defending the northwestern flank of Iași.

After withdrawing the three part-encircled divisions of 35th Corps, Trofimenko reorganized the 27th Army's defenses along a line extending from north of Târgu Frumos eastward to north of Podu Iloaiei. By the end of 12 April, Goriachev deployed the 206th, 3rd Guards and 93rd Divisions from left to right in defensive positions stretching from the eastern bank of Siret River near Pașcani, 15 miles (24 km) west of Târgu Frumos, eastward to the village of Munteni, 10 miles (16 km) northeast of Târgu Frumos, while further to the east, three rifle divisions from 33rd Rifle Corps were placed 9 miles (14 km) northwest of Iași. Irritated by the defeat his troops faced at Târgu Frumos, on 12 April Konev ordered Bogdanov, whose 2nd Tank Army concentrated its two corps south of Focuri, 10 miles (16 km) north of Podu Iloaiei, to assault the Romanian and German defenders at Podu Iloaiei.
