= First Sănătescu cabinet =

First Anti-extremist cabinet in Romania

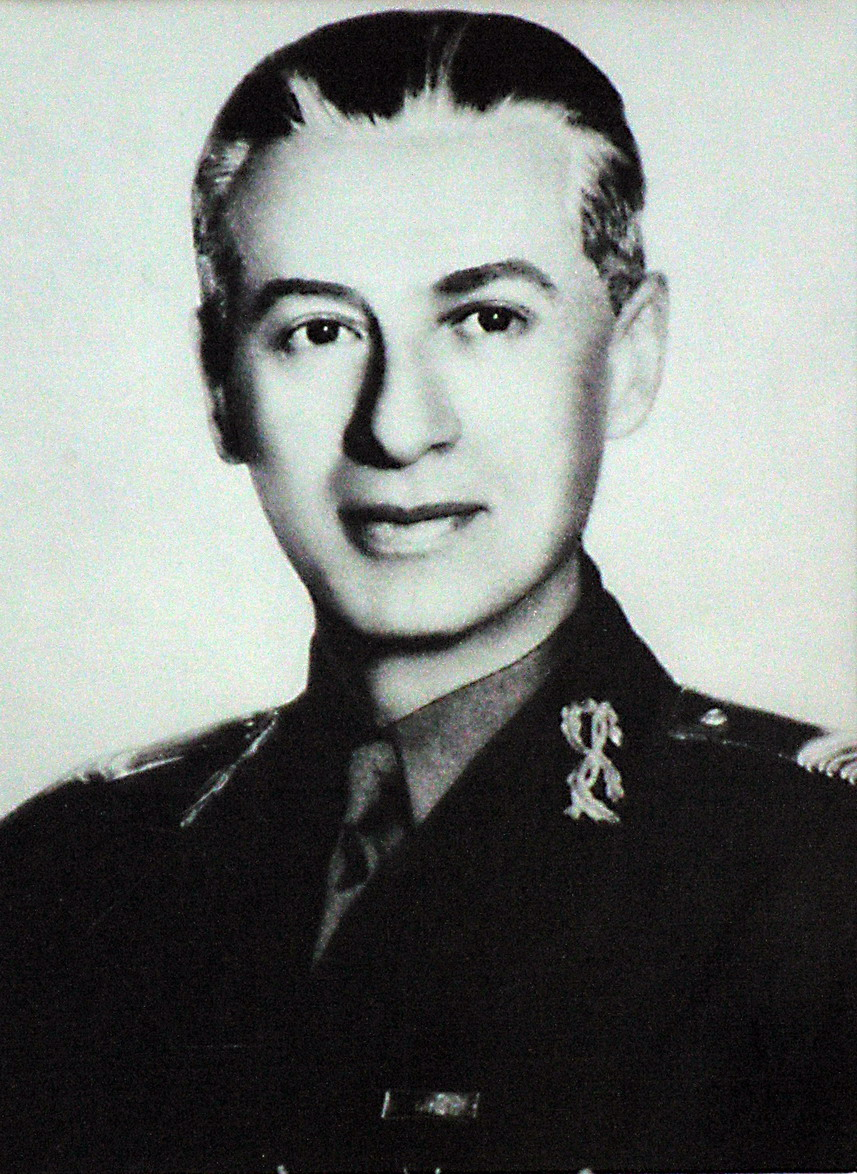
Constantin Sănătescu

The first Sănătescu cabinet was the government of Romania from 23 August to 3 November 1944. During this period, Romania left the Axis powers and joined the Allies of World War II.

== Composition ==
The ministers of the cabinet were as follows:

- President of the Council of Ministers:

- Gen. Constantin Sănătescu (23 August – 3 November 1944)

- Minister Secretary of State:

- Iuliu Maniu (23 August – 3 November 1944)

- Minister Secretary of State:

- Dinu Brătianu (23 August – 3 November 1944)

- Minister Secretary of State:

- Lucrețiu Pătrășcanu (23 August – 3 November 1944)

- Minister Secretary of State:

- Constantin Titel Petrescu (23 August – 3 November 1944)

- Minister of State Secretary for the Department of War:

- Gen. Ioan Mihail Racoviță (23 August – 3 November 1944)

- Minister of State Secretary for the Department of Foreign Affairs:

- Grigore Niculescu-Buzești (23 August – 3 November 1944)

- Minister of State Secretary for the Department of Internal Affairs:

- Gen. Aurel Aldea (23 August – 3 November 1944)

- Minister of State Secretary for the Department of National Economy and Finance:

- Gen. Gheorghe Potopeanu (23 August – 13 October 1944)
- (interim) Gen. Constantin Sănătescu (13 October – 3 November 1944)

- Minister of State Secretary for the Department of Labour, Health and Social Security:

- Gen. Nicolae Marinescu (23 August – 3 November 1944)

- Minister of State Secretary for the Department of Agriculture and Property

- Dimitrie Negel (23 August – 3 November 1944)

- Minister of State Secretary for the Department of National Culture and Religious Affairs:

- Gen. Ion Boițeanu (23 August – 3 November 1944)

- Minister of State Secretary for the Department of Public Works and Communications:

- Gen. Constantin Eftimiu (23 August – 3 November 1944)

- Minister of State Secretary for the Department of Justice:

- (interim) Lucrețiu Pătrășcanu (23 August – 7 September 1944)
- Aureliu Căpățână (7 September – 4 October 1944)
- (interim) Dimitrie Negel (4 October – 3 November 1944)

Preceded by Third Antonescu cabinet	Cabinet of Romania; 23 August 1944 – 3 November 1944	Succeeded by Second Sănătescu cabinet
