= Ioan Hudiță =

Romanian historian and politician

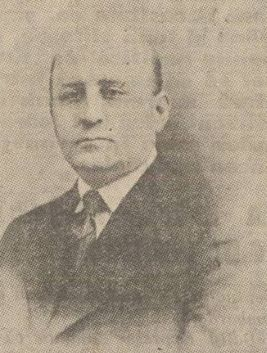

Ioan Hudiță (August 1, 1896 – March 21, 1982) was a Romanian historian and politician.

Born in Bogdănești, Baia County, he attended gymnasium at Fălticeni (1907–1911) and high school in Iași (1911–1914). He then entered Iași University, studying history and geography within the letters faculty, and in the law faculty. He earned two degrees: in law (1918) and in geography, letters and philosophy (1919). From 1919 to 1921, he taught at Bogdan Petriceicu Hasdeu High School in Chișinău. In 1927, he obtained a doctorate from the University of Paris, with a thesis about 17th-century relations between France and the Principality of Transylvania. He was associate professor of diplomatic history at Iași University from 1928 to 1935, as well as teaching at the Military High School. From 1935 to 1938, he was associate professor at the Academy of Higher-level Commercial and Industrial Studies in Bucharest. Teaching diplomatic history, he held a similar rank in the University of Bucharest’s history faculty from 1941 to 1944, rising to full professor from 1944 to 1947.

A member of the National Peasants' Party, of which he was adjunct general secretary from 1940, he was first elected to the Assembly of Deputies in 1932. From 1944 to 1945, he was Agriculture Minister under Constantin Sănătescu and Nicolae Rădescu. In October 1947, he was arrested by the Romanian Communist Party-dominated government. Held at Văcărești, Craiova and Sighet prisons, he was released in December 1955. From 1956 to 1959, he was principal researcher at Bucharest's Nicolae Iorga History Institute. He was again under arrest from December 1961 to July 1962. He collected archival documents about Romania in Paris, London, Brussels and Berlin, which he did not have a chance to publish. He wrote studies about Franco-Romanian diplomatic relations, and about the modern history of Romania. He left unpublished studies of the May 1864 coup, the 1862-1863 Constantinople conference resulting in the definitive Union of the Principalities, and the issue of capitulations and the great powers during the time of Alexandru Ioan Cuza. He died in Bucharest.

His daughter, Ioana (1922–2008), was married to historian Dan Berindei. The two had a son, noted historian Mihnea Berindei (1948–2016). Their daughter, Ruxandra, was born in 1951 at Văcărești Prison, while her mother was incarcerated there; Dan Berindei only saw his daughter after 11 months, while Ioana was still detained at Mislea Prison.
