= First Jassy–Kishinev offensive =

Soviet 1944 offensive into Romania

- Part of Eastern Front, World War II
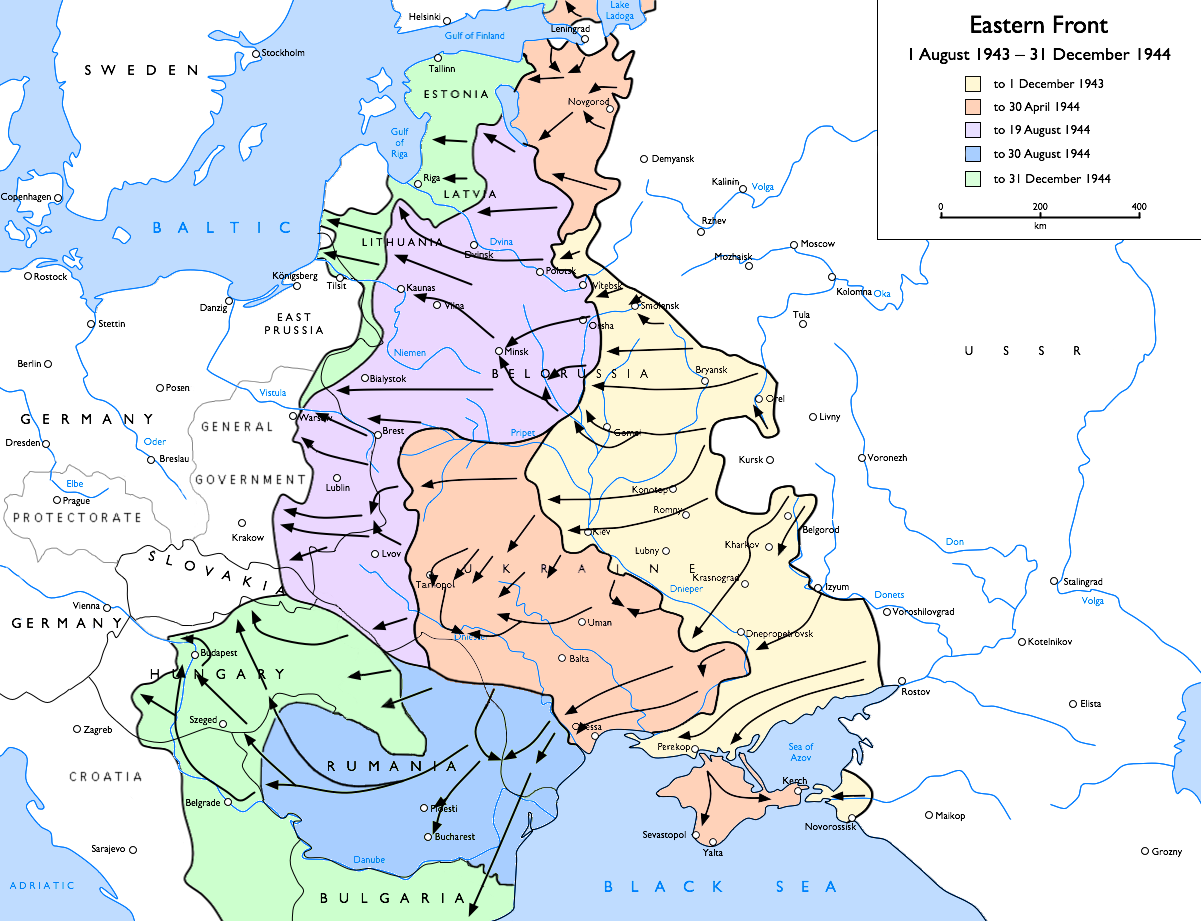
- Advance of the Red Army, 1943–1944
| Date | 8 April – 6 June 1944 |
| Location | Eastern Romania |
| Result | Axis victory |

Belligerents
| Romania; Germany | Soviet Union |

Commanders and leaders
| (Kingdom of Romania) Petre Dumitrescu (Nazi Germany) Otto Wöhler | (Soviet Union) Ivan Konev (Soviet Union) Rodion Malinovsky |

Strength
| 300,000 | 830,000 |

Casualties and losses
| 45,000 casualties | 150,000 casualties |

The first Jassy–Kishinev offensive, named after the two major cities in the area, Jassy and Kishinev, was a series of military engagements between 8 April and 6 June 1944 (according to David Glantz) by the Soviet Union and Axis powers. Richard C. Hall also refers to a first Jassy–Kishinev operation which began on 5 April, without providing an exact date for its end. According to Glantz, the purported offensive was a coordinated invasion of Romania conducted by Red Army's 2nd and 3rd Ukrainian Fronts, in accordance with Joseph Stalin's strategy of projecting Soviet military power and political influence into the Balkans. However, according to the German Military History Research Office, a threatened Soviet offensive in northern Moldavia "failed to materialize" in the first part of April, and the military engagements during the rest of the month were used by the Axis forces to straighten the frontline; furthermore, on 6 May, the main command of the Soviet military (Stavka) issued orders to take no further offensive actions in this sector of the front.

Glantz claims that the plans of the Stavka envisioned the two Soviet fronts would cut off vital Axis defensive lines in northern Romania, facilitating a subsequent advance by the Red Army into the entire Balkan region. Glantz considers the Soviet attack commenced with the First Battle of Târgu Frumos and the Battle of Podu Iloaiei, and culminated with the Second Battle of Târgu Frumos. Soviet forces failed to overcome German defenses in the region and the offensive operation ultimately failed, mainly due to the poor combat performance of Soviet troops and the effectiveness of German defensive preparations. Conversely, according to the German Military History Research Office, the battles at Târgu Frumos were part of the Soviet offensive that had begun in March, and the Germans and Romanians profited from the bad weather conditions to obtain a defensive success.

Glantz claims this operation is part of a series of battles almost completely ignored by Soviet archival records and historiography: "During the almost 60 years since the end of World War II, Soviet and Russian military historians and theorists have carefully erased from the historical record any mention of the 2nd and 3rd Ukrainian Fronts' first Iasi–Kishinev offensive, during which the Red Army's two fronts attempted to invade Romania in April and May 1944. As is the case with so many other military operations the Red Army conducted during the war, they have done this deliberately, in the process relegating this offensive to a lengthy list of "forgotten battles" of the Soviet–German War."

== Planning ==
On 5 March 1944, Marshal Ivan Konev—commander of the 2nd Ukrainian Front—commenced the Uman–Botoșani offensive operation in Ukraine. This operation succeeded in separating Army Group South's 1st Panzer-Armee from 8th Army by 17 March. By early April Soviet units approached the Romanian border.

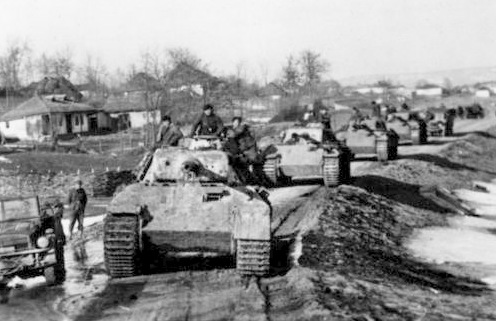
Vehicles and Panther tanks of the Grossdeutschland division in Romania – April 1944

Glantz claims that starting with early April 1944, Stavka ordered the 2nd and 3rd Ukrainian Fronts to mount a major offensive with strategic implications in Romania. In Glantz's view, Stavka's strategic intentions were to break German and Romanian strategic defenses in northern Romania, capture the key cities of Iași and Chișinău, and afterward project forces deep into Romanian territory, if possible as deep as Ploiești and Bucharest. By 5 April, Konev's front had crossed the upper reaches of Dniester and Prut rivers, captured Hotin and Dorohoi, and approached the Târgu Frumos and Botoșani regions—30–60 mi (48–97 km) northwest of Iași—facing only light Romanian resistance. On 8 April, Konev ordered the 27th and 40th Armies to conduct a coordinated offensive southward along the Târgu Frumos axis, in close cooperation with Semyon Bogdanov's 2nd Tank Army. While Konev's shock group was advancing toward Târgu Frumos, Konstantin Koroteev's 52nd Army and elements of Andrei Gravchenko's 6th Tank Army— which were operating north of Iași—were conducting operations alongside the Iași axis in order to support Konev's main effort.

As Konev's armies prepared to launch their offensive toward Târgu Frumos, Otto Wöhler's German 8th Army was involved in the heavy fighting taking place in and around the village of Popricani, 9 mi (14 km) north of Iași, where two Soviet corps were fighting with armored Kampfgruppen, distracting the Germans' attentions and forces away from the critical Târgu Frumos sector. Exploiting the 52nd Army diversionary operations in the Iași region, the three armies of Konev's shock group began advancing southward early in the morning of 8 April. The advance was quite slow due to mud-clogged roads during the rasputitsa (the twice yearly period of water-logged ground), as well as crossing to the west bank of the Prut River northwest of Iași.

According to Glantz, Konev's armies' initial mission was to reach the Târgu Frumos, Pașcani, and Târgu Neamț regions —30–60 mi (48–97 km) west of Iași—and capture the three towns from their Romanian defenders by surprise. While three divisions of 51st Rifle Corps were supposedly ordered to press southward toward Pașcani, another two rifle divisions were protecting their advance in the region north and northwest of Târgu Neamț. Further to the east, seven rifle divisions assigned to 35th Guards and 33rd Rifle Corps of 27th Army would advance southeastward along the Prut starting on 7 April, forcing the Romanian 8th Infantry Division to retreat toward Hârlău, 17 mi (27 km) north of Târgu Frumos. Meanwhile, another two divisions of 33rd Rifle Corps joined by two corps of the 2nd Tank Army would press the Romanian 7th Infantry Division back toward Târgu Frumos.

== See also ==
- Second Jassy–Kishinev offensive
