= Nicolae Rădescu =

Romanian army officer and political figure (1874–1953)

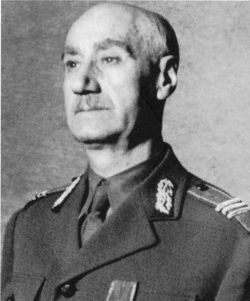

45th Prime Minister of Romania
- In office 7 December 1944 – 1 March 1945
- Monarch: Michael I
- Deputy: Petru Groza
- Preceded by: Constantin Sănătescu
- Succeeded by: Petru Groza

Chief of the Romanian General Staff
- In office 15 October 1944 – 6 December 1944
- Monarch: Michael I
- Preceded by: Gheorghe Mihail
- Succeeded by: Constantin Sănătescu

Minister of Internal Affairs
- In office 14 December 1944 – 28 February 1945
- Prime Minister: Himself
- Preceded by: Constantin Sănătescu
- Succeeded by: Teohari Georgescu

Personal details
- Born: 30 March 1874 Călimănești, Romania
- Died: 16 May 1953 (aged 79) Manhattan, New York, U.S.
- Resting place: Bellu Cemetery, Bucharest
- Party: People's Party; Crusade of Romanianism
- Spouse: Gizela Ettinger
- Children: Nicu Rădescu
- Education: Higher War School
- Profession: Military
- Awards: Order of Michael the Brave

Military service
- Allegiance: Kingdom of Romania
- Branch/service: Romanian Land Forces
- Rank: General de Corp de Armată (Lieutenant General)
- Battles/wars: Second Balkan War; World War I World War II

Nicolae Rădescu (Romanian pronunciation: [nikoˈla.e rəˈdesku]; 30 March 1874 – 16 May 1953) was a Romanian army officer and political figure. He was the last pre-communist rule Prime Minister of Romania, serving from 7 December 1944 to 1 March 1945.

== Biography ==
=== Early life and education ===
The son of small landowners (Radu and Zamfira), Rădescu was born on 30 March 1874 in Călimănești, Vâlcea County. He attended the Military School for Officers, graduating on 1 July 1898 with the rank of second lieutenant. He pursued his military studies at the Cavalry School, graduating in June 1900 and being promoted to lieutenant in 1903, and then at the Higher War School in Bucharest (1904–1905), being promoted to captain on 4 October 1909.

=== Second Balkan War and World War I ===
In the summer of 1913 he saw action with the 1st Cavalry Division in the military campaign in Bulgaria during the Second Balkan War. He was promoted to major on 1 April 1916, and served in World War I during the Romanian Campaign of 1916 with the 5th Regiment Călărași, fighting against the German forces at the Carpathian mountain passes. For his bravery and skill at the Battle of Sălătrucu, in the Topolog Valley, he was awarded on 10 January 1917 the Order of Michael the Brave, 3rd Class. In April 1917 he was promoted to lieutenant colonel; he served as Chief of Staff for the 2nd Cavalry Division until 1 September 1918, and was promoted to colonel in April 1919.

=== The Interwar period ===
On 27 May 1920 Rădescu was appointed adjutant of King Ferdinand, after which he served as military attaché in London (1926–1928). Upon his return, he was promoted in March 1928 to brigadier general. He served as commanding officer of the 4th Brigade Roșiori, after which he was attached to the Inspectorate-General of Cavalry, and then commanded the 1st Cavalry Division (1931–1933). He resigned from the Army on 5 February 1933 and transferred to the retired reserves. Upon presenting his resignation, he accused "profiteering politicians" and King Carol II's camarilla of commercializing military life.

That same month Rădescu joined the People's Party of Marshal Alexandru Averescu. In the mid-1930s, he became involved in nationalist politics; he supported a far right movement called Cruciada Românismului ("The Crusade of Romanianism"), aimed at the cultural "Romanization" of Germans and Hungarians in Transylvania. This short-lived movement was a splinter group of the Iron Guard, created by Mihai Stelescu. After Stelescu was assassinated in July 1936 by an Iron Guard death squad, Rădescu became a leader of the movement, which quickly faded afterwards. Because of his political stances and his opinions regarding the royal camarilla, he started being monitored by the secret police (Siguranța Statului).

=== World War II and the rise of Communism ===
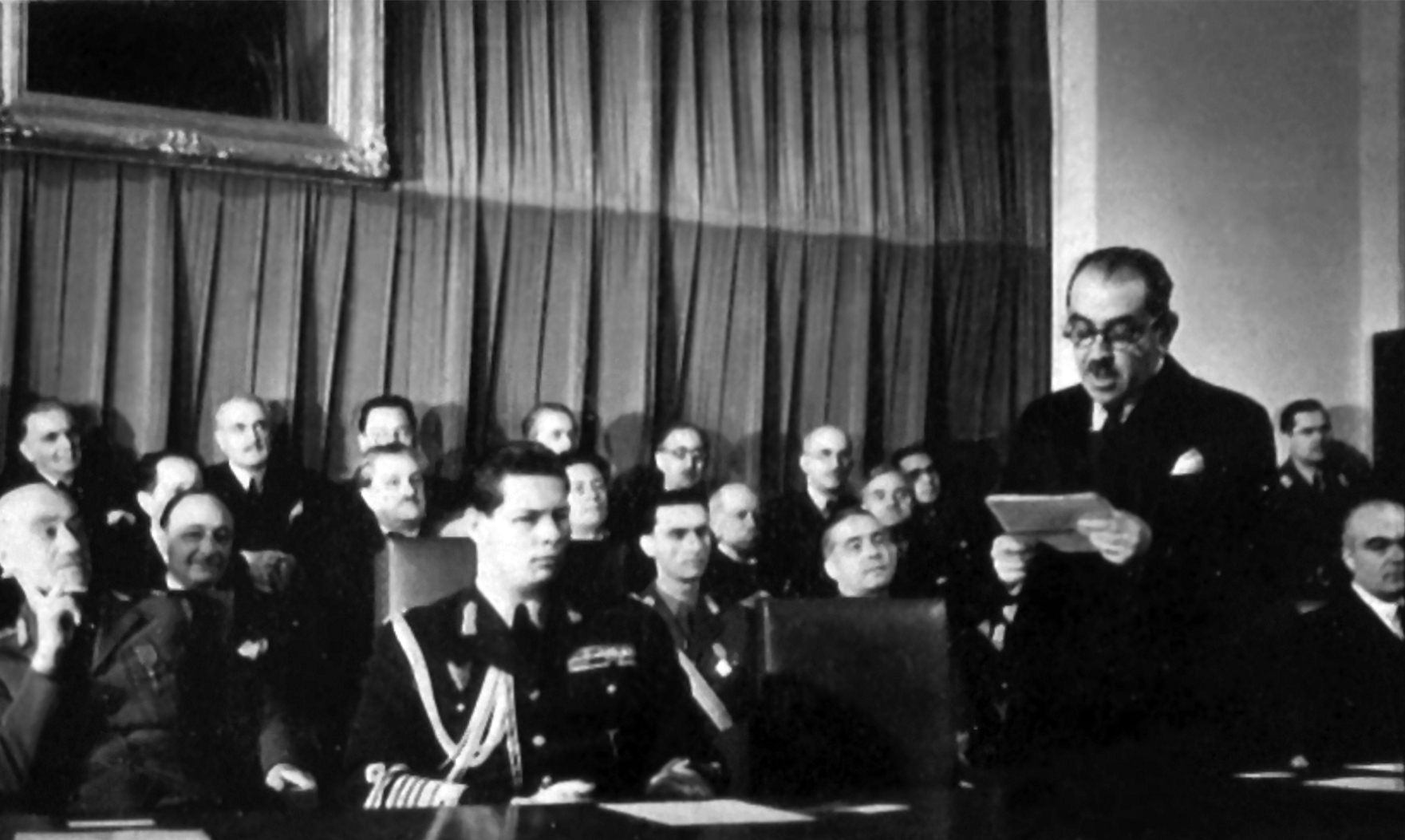
Rădescu and King Michael I listening to Simion Stoilow, Rector of the University of Bucharest, at the opening celebration for the 1945–1946 academic year

After King Carol II abdicated in September 1940, Rădescu charged dictator Ion Antonescu with collaborating with the Nazis. As noted by ex-President Emil Constantinescu at a memorial ceremony, Rădescu opposed the advance of Romanian troops beyond the Dniester River after Bessarabia and Northern Bukovina had been recaptured in 1941 from the Soviet Union. In 1942, Rădescu wrote an article critical of the German ambassador Manfred Freiherr von Killinger and his constant intrusion in the internal affairs of Romania. He was interned as a political prisoner in the Târgu Jiu camp. On 23 August 1944, immediately after Antonescu's downfall in King Michael's Coup, Rădescu was released from prison. On 15 October he was appointed Chief of the Romanian General Staff at the insistence of the Soviet government, which favored him for his independence and his reputation as an ardent anti-fascist who was respected by the people.

He became prime minister on 7 December 1944. The Soviet government initially supported him; on a visit to Bucharest, the Deputy Foreign Minister, Andrey Vyshinsky, publicly expressed Soviet confidence in the Rădescu government. Soon after the situation changed, as conflicts over the armistice agreement emerged, especially over Moscow's demand for $300 million in reparations; Rădescu also resisted the Soviet order to deport Germans from Romania to the Soviet Union. To assist with the imposition of a communist government, the Soviet NKGB and the Romanian communists supported the Patriotic Defense Guards; these paramilitary organizations, which appeared after August 1944, were placed under the command of Emil Bodnăraș. On 15 January 1945, Rădescu ordered the dissolution of the Guards, but Teohari Georgescu and Bodnăraș ignored the instructions. At the same time, Deputy Prime Minister Petru Groza, anticipating the imminent agrarian reform, encouraged the peasants to forcibly take the land of the big landlords.

On 24 February 1945, the Communist Party of Romania and its allies organized a mass rally in front of the Royal Palace to call for his resignation. As the protest carried on, communist agents opened fire from the Interior Ministry building situated across the street, killing several people. In a radio address later that day, Rădescu blamed the attack on Ana Pauker and Vasile Luca, calling them "hyenas" and "strangers without kin or God". The next day, the Communist Party orchestrated an unprecedented propaganda campaign against Rădescu. His son, Nicu, who had participated at the rally (he had been recruited into the Party in 1940), wrote an open letter to his father; the letter, published in Scînteia and România Liberă on 28 February, accused Rădescu of issuing the order to shoot peaceful demonstrators. Radio Moscow called Rădescu the "Butcher of Palace Square". Concomitantly, Vyshinsky arrived in Bucharest and demanded from King Michael the resignation of Rădescu; at the direction of Joseph Stalin, he warned that the Soviet Union would not allow Northern Transylvania to be returned to Romania if Rădescu were to remain prime minister. As a result of all these pressures, Rădescu resigned his position on 1 March.

On 6 March 1945, the first Communist-dominated government of Romania took office under the direction of Petru Groza. Over the next few years, the Communists completely consolidated their power.

=== Exile in the West ===
One of the first decrees of the Groza government (issued on 7 March 1945) was to impose mandatory domicile for General Rădescu. Pursued by the Communist authorities, Rădescu sought refuge in the British legation, stayed there for about two months, and was then handed over to Romanian authorities, who had guaranteed his safety but placed him under house arrest. His personal secretary, Adriana Georgescu-Cosmovici, was arrested and was subjected to rape and torture at Malmaison Prison in Bucharest. On 17 June 1946, he managed to flee on board a plane to the British Crown colony of Cyprus, where he was detained in a refugee camp by the authorities until the Paris Peace Treaties were signed in 1947. Via Lisbon and Paris he ended up in the United States. Once in America, he and other exiled Romanian political figures, including Augustin Popa, Mihail Fărcășanu, Grigore Gafencu, and Constantin Vișoianu, came together to form a united anti-communist opposition in exile called the Romanian National Committee. In 1950, after disagreements within the committee, he was one of the founders of the Liga Românilor Liberi ("The League of Free Romanians"), together with Grigore Gafencu, Nicolae Caranfil, Mihail Fărcășanu, Carol "Citta" Davila, Viorel Tilea, general Ion Gheorghe, and Vintilă Brătianu.

Rădescu died of tuberculosis on 16 May 1953 in New York City; he was buried in the city's Calvary Cemetery. At the initiative of Prime Minister Mugur Isărescu, the remains of General Rădescu were brought back to Romania in 2000. Following the wishes expressed in his testament, he was reburied at the Orthodox Bellu Cemetery in Bucharest on 23 November 2000.

Military offices
Preceded by Gheorghe Mihail	Chief of the Romanian General Staff; 15 October 1944 – 6 December 1944	Succeeded by Constantin Sănătescu
Political offices
Preceded by Constantin Sănătescu	Prime Minister of Romania; 6 December 1944 – 28 February 1945	Succeeded by Petru Groza
