= 1944 Romanian coup d'état =

Coup d'état led by Romanian king Michael I

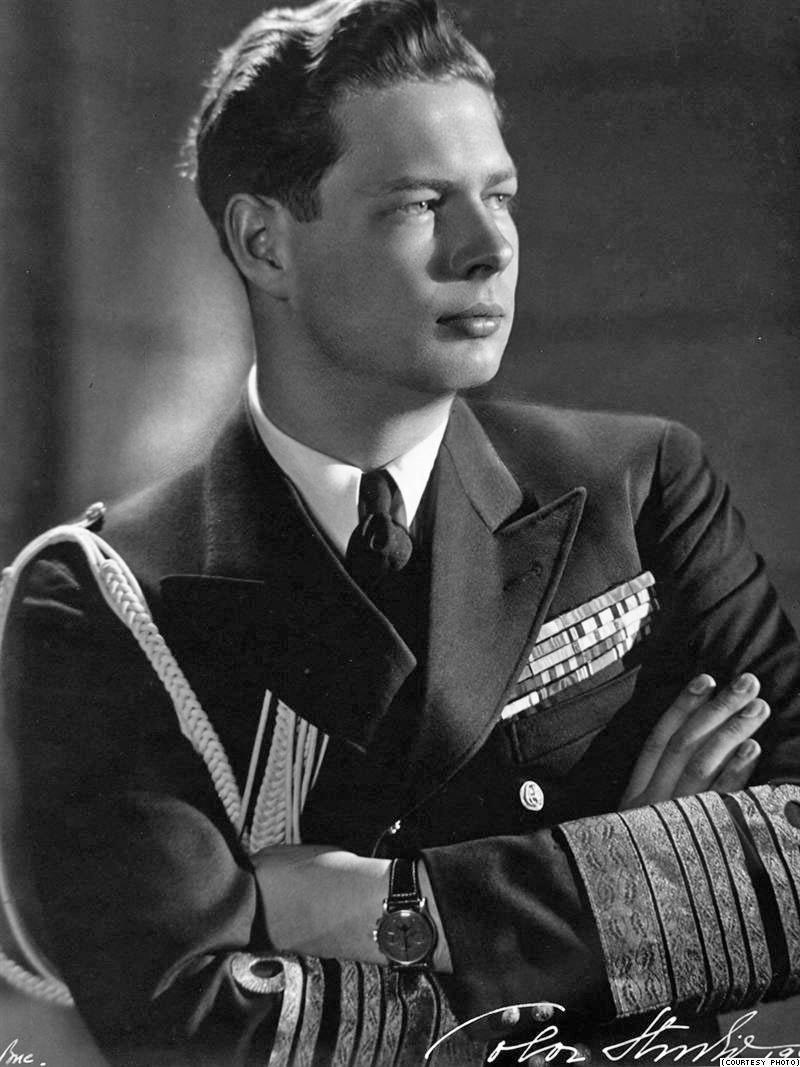
- King Michael I of Romania
- Date: 23 August 1944
- Location: Bucharest, Kingdom of Romania
- Participants: King Michael I; National Liberal Party; National Peasants' Party; Communist Party; Social Democratic Party; Ion Antonescu; Nazi Germany
- Outcome: Coup successful: Removal and arrest of Ion Antonescu and his government; Installation of a pro-Allied government under Constantin Sănătescu; Romania switches sides in World War II from the Axis to the Allies

The 1944 Romanian coup d'état, better known in Romanian historiography as the Act of 23 August (Romanian: Actul de la 23 august), was a coup d'état led by King Michael I of Romania during World War II on 23 August 1944. With the support of several political parties, the king removed the government of Ion Antonescu, which had aligned Romania with Nazi Germany, after the Axis front in northeastern Romania collapsed in the face of a successful Soviet offensive. The Romanian Army declared a unilateral ceasefire with the Soviet Red Army on the Moldavian front, an event viewed as decisive in the Allied advances against the Axis powers in the European theatre of World War II. The coup was supported by the Romanian Communist Party, the Social Democratic Party, the National Liberal Party, and the National Peasants' Party who had coalesced into the National Democratic Bloc in June 1944.

== Preparations ==
According to Silviu Brucan, the two main conspirators from the Communist Party's side were Emil Bodnăraș and Lucrețiu Pătrășcanu, who contacted King Michael to prepare a coup d'état against Ion Antonescu. The first meeting between King Michael's representatives with the Communists was during the night of 13–14 June 1944 in a secret house of the communists, at 103 Calea Moșilor. Apart from the two communist conspirators, participants in the meeting were Gen. Gheorghe Mihail, Gen. Constantin Sănătescu and Col. Dumitru Dămăceanu, while King Michael was represented by Baron Ioan Mocsony-Stârcea (marshal of the palace), Mircea Ionnițiu (private secretary) and Grigore Niculescu-Buzești (diplomatic adviser).

The King's representatives presented the Gigurtu plan, through which the King would meet Baron Manfred Freiherr von Killinger, the German ambassador in Bucharest, to discuss the replacement of Antonescu with a cabinet led by Ion Gigurtu. The Communist Party thought that this plan was "naïve and dangerous", as it would have alerted the Gestapo and that it would have meant even more German espionage.

The Communist Party presented an alternative plan, through which King Michael, who was the commander-in-chief, would order the weapons to be turned against Nazi Germany and Antonescu would be summoned to the palace, ordered to sign an armistice with the Allies and, if he refused, be arrested on the spot. After this, a coalition government of the National Democratic Bloc (the National Peasants' Party, the National Liberal Party, the Social Democratic Party and the Romanian Communist Party) would take power.

This proposal was accepted by both the military representatives and the King's advisers, who then convinced King Michael that it was the best solution.

== The coup ==
On 23 August 1944, the king joined with pro-Allied opposition politicians and led a successful coup with support from the army. The king, who was initially considered to be not much more than a "figurehead", was able to successfully depose Antonescu. The king offered a non-confrontational retreat to Killinger, but the Germans considered the coup "reversible" and tried to turn the situation around by military attacks.

On 23 August 1944, the King met with Prime Minister Ion Antonescu, Foreign Affairs Minister Mihai Antonescu (no relation) and General Constantin Sănătescu. During discussions that lasted an hour, Ion Antonescu informed the King of the situation at the frontlines. King Michael asked Antonescu to get out of the war and sign an armistice with the Allies and the Soviets. Antonescu retorted that the armistice would be nullified by Germany and refused to commit to an armistice, especially with the Soviet Union. The King said "If things are so, then there's nothing we can do."

This triggered the coup. A colonel and four soldiers came in and arrested the Prime Minister. Later that night, at 10 pm, the King announced over the radio that Antonescu had been deposed and an armistice with the Allied Powers and the Soviet Union would be accepted.

The Romanian forces — namely the First Army, the Second Army (under formation), the remnants of the Third Army and the Fourth Army (one corps) — were under orders from the king to defend Romania against any German attacks. The king then offered to put Romania's battered armies on the side of the Allies.

== Aftermath ==
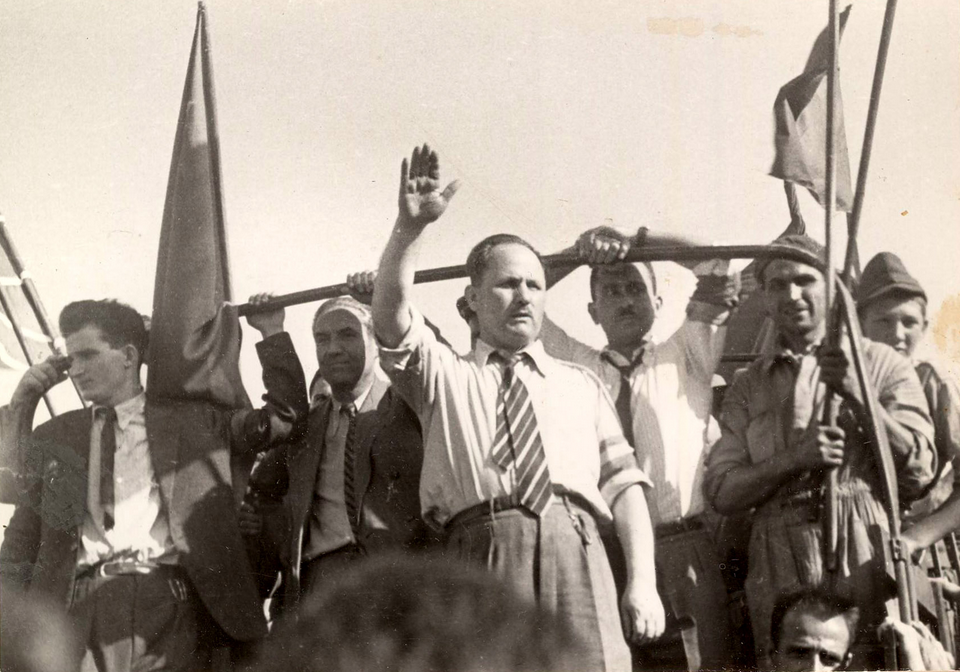
Nicolae Ceausescu, Constantin Agiu and others meet at the entrance of the Red Army in Bucharest (Colentina) on 30 August 1944

Hungarian-American historian John Lukacs praised the coup, writing: "In August 1944, the Rumanians executed the most successful coup d'etat during World War II. With an entire German Army in their midst, they turned around within twenty-four hours and proclaimed their alliance with the Soviet Union, Britain and the United States." Comparing the coup to the Italian Civil War, Lukacs wrote, "Again the comparison with Italy is instructive: compared to this acrobatic feat, the descendants of Machiavelli were mere bunglers."

Due to Romania's successful defection, most of the country's economy had survived virtually intact. The ensuing reconstruction of the oil industry showed that Romania had less power of refusal under Stalin than under Hitler. Unlike Italy's earlier capitulation, Romania's initiative began to unravel the Axis. Within one month, Bulgaria and Finland also changed sides, the Slovak National Uprising began, and a failed coup was attempted in Croatia on 18 September. Economically, Albert Speer regarded Romania's defection as decisive, because it not only deprived the Axis of Romanian oil but also definitively cut off access to vital supplies of Turkish chromium. The loss of Romania's oil resulted in Hitler's first admission that the war was lost. All of these were accomplished with minimal damage to Romanian infrastructure, as the country's core never became a battlefield. The coup also marked the last instance when Romania's actions significantly influenced the wider course of the war.

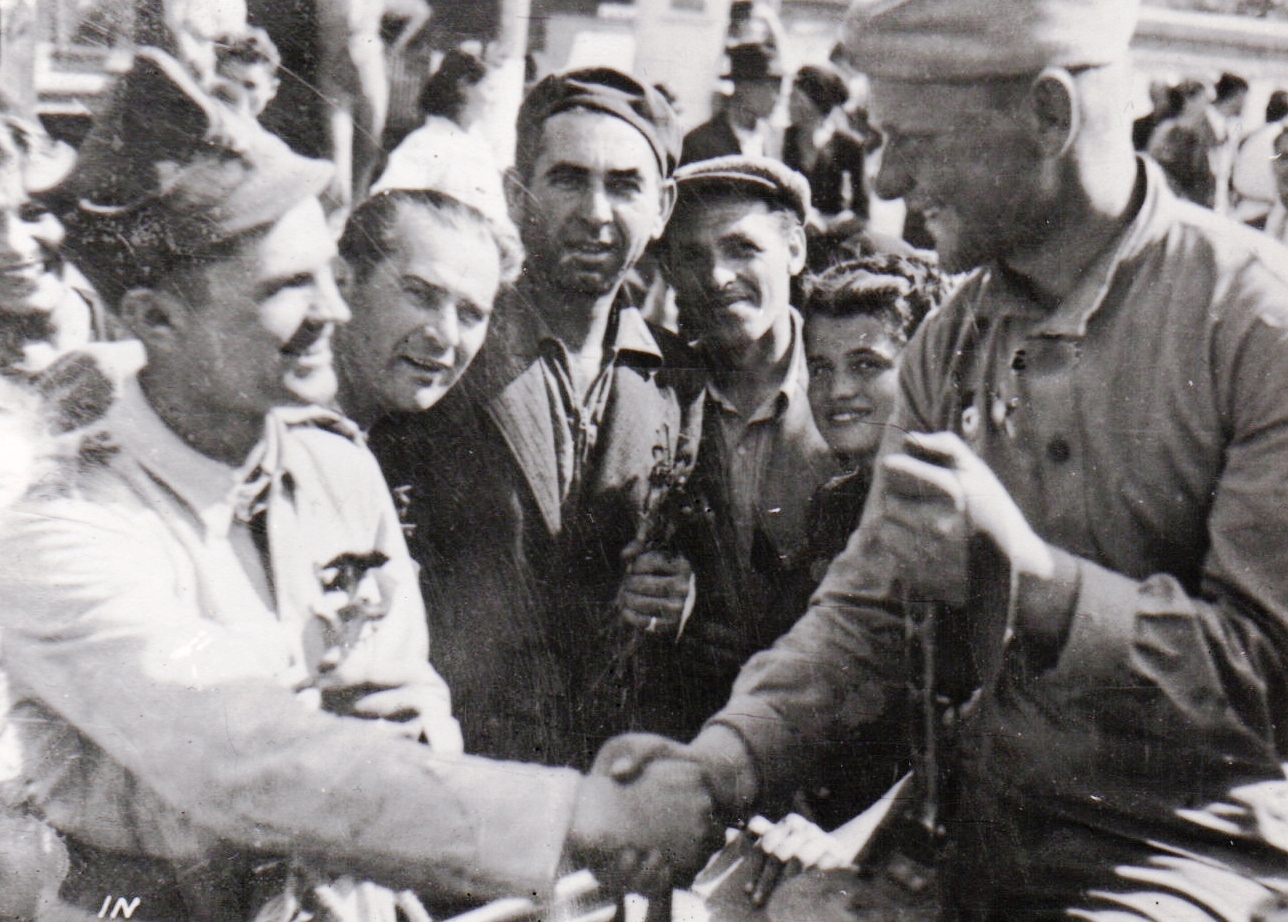
Romanian and Soviet soldiers shaking hands in Bucharest after the coup, 30 August 1944

The coup sped the Red Army's advance into Romania. Romanian historians claimed that the coup shortened the war by as much as "six months."

Formal Allied recognition of the de facto change of orientation of Romania in the war came on 12 September 1944. Until this date, Soviet troops started moving into Romania, taking approximately 140,000 Romanian prisoners of war. About 130,000 Romanian POWs were transported to the Soviet Union, where many perished in prison camps.

The armistice was signed on the same date, 12 September 1944, on Allied terms. Article 18 of the Armistice Agreement with Rumania stipulated that "An Allied Control Commission will be established which will undertake until the conclusion of peace the regulation of and control over the execution of the present terms under the general direction and orders of the Allied (Soviet) High Command, acting on behalf of the Allied Powers." The Annex to Article 18, specified that "The Romanian Government and their organs shall fulfill all instructions of the Allied Control Commission arising out of the Armistice Agreement." It also made clear that the Allied Control Commission would have its seat in Bucharest. In line with Article 14 of the Armistice Agreement, two Romanian People's Tribunals were set up to try suspected war criminals.

Article 19 stipulated the return to Romania of "Transylvania or the greater part of it". This phrasing conveyed the possibility of a revision of the Treaty of Trianon border, and it was meant to tempt Hungary to also cease fighting alongside Germany. At the same time the article also declared Vienna Award "null and void". On 15 October 1944, regent of Hungary Miklós Horthy indeed tried to follow Romania's example and negotiate a surrender, but his attempt was thwarted. Northern Transylvania was under Soviet military administration from November 1944 to March 1945. On 9 March 1945, three days after the formation of the Petru Groza cabinet, Stalin approved the return of all of Northern Transylvania to Romanian administration. Subsequent Hungarian efforts to recover part of Northern Transylvania were in vain.

In October 1944, Winston Churchill, Prime Minister of the United Kingdom, as part of a proposed agreement with Soviet leader Joseph Stalin on how to divide Eastern Europe into spheres of influence after the war. It was reportedly agreed that Soviet Union would have a "90% share of influence" in Romania.

The Romanian Army, from the armistice until the end of the war, were fighting alongside the Soviets against Germany and its remaining allies. They fought in Transylvania, Hungary and Czechoslovakia. In May 1945 the Romanian First and Fourth Armies took part in the Prague Offensive. The Romanians suffered a total of 169,822 casualties (in all causes) fighting on the Allied side.

Ion Antonescu was placed under arrest; the new prime minister, Lt. Gen. Constantin Sănătescu, gave custody of Antonescu to Romanian communists who would turn the former dictator over to the Soviets on 1 September. He was later returned to Romania, where he was tried and executed in 1946.

For his actions, King Michael was awarded the Soviet Order of Victory by Joseph Stalin in 1945. He was also awarded the highest degree (Chief Commander) of the Legion of Merit by President Harry S. Truman a year later. Nevertheless, he functioned as little more than a figurehead under the new régime. He was finally forced to abdicate and leave the country in 1947. This allowed the Communists to set up a communist government. Michael remained in exile until after the 1989 Romanian revolution and was only allowed to return to the country in 1992.

== See also ==
- Fall of the Fascist regime in Italy
- Armistice of Cassibile
- Operation Valkyrie
- 1944 Bulgarian coup d'état
- Moscow Armistice and Lapland War
- Romania during World War II
- German Military Mission in Romania
