= Constantin Sănătescu =

44th Prime Minister of Romania (1885–1947)

General Constantin Sănătescu
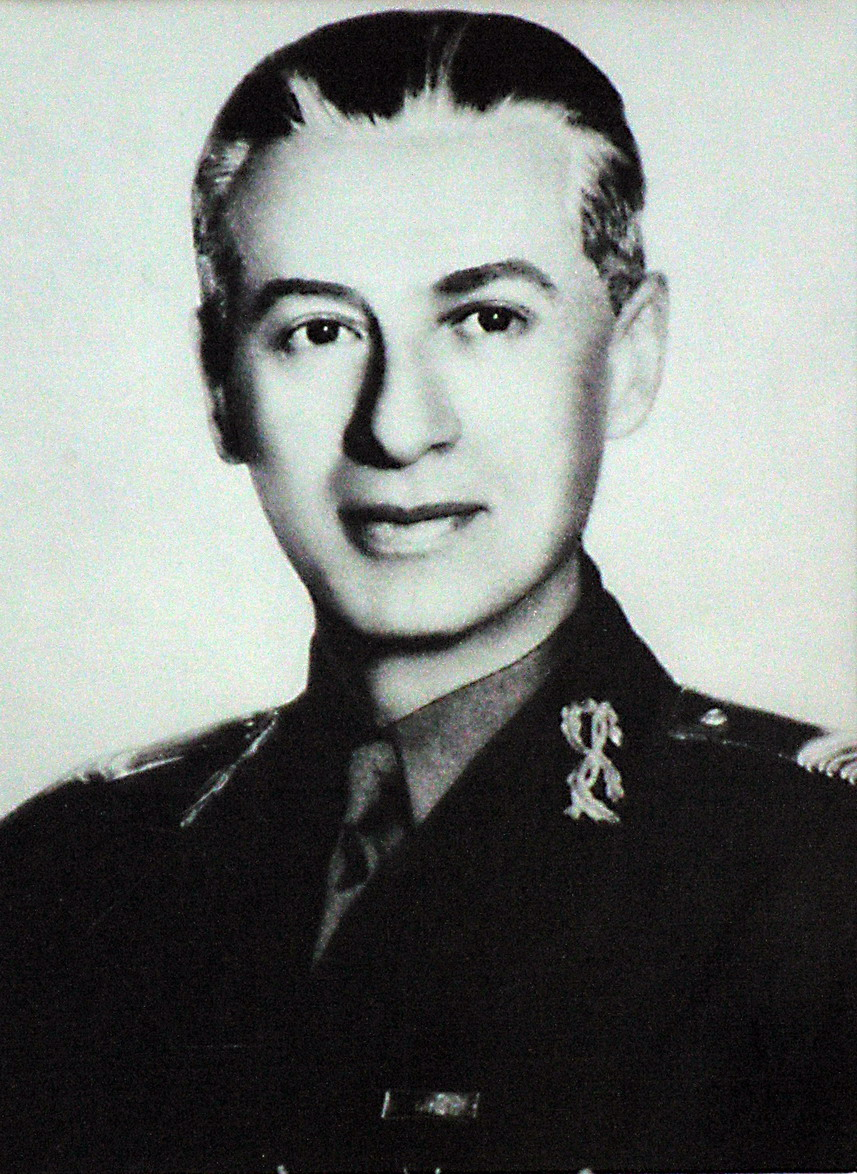

44th Prime Minister of Romania
- In office 23 August 1944 – 5 December 1944
- Monarch: Michael I
- Deputy: Petru Groza
- Preceded by: Ion Antonescu
- Succeeded by: Nicolae Rădescu

Minister of Finance
- In office 12 October 1944 – 4 November 1944
- Prime Minister: Himself
- Preceded by: Gheorghe Potopeanu
- Succeeded by: Mihail Romniceanu

45th Chief of the General Staff
- In office 11 December 1944 – 20 June 1945
- Monarch: Michael I
- Preceded by: Nicolae Rădescu
- Succeeded by: Costin Ionașcu

Minister of Internal Affairs
- In office 6 December 1944 – 14 December 1944
- Prime Minister: Nicolae Rădescu
- Preceded by: Nicolae Penescu
- Succeeded by: Nicolae Rădescu

Personal details
- Born: January 14, 1885 Craiova, Kingdom of Romania
- Died: November 8, 1947 (aged 62) Bucharest, Kingdom of Romania
- Resting place: Bellu Cemetery, Bucharest
- Cabinet: Sănătescu I Sănătescu II
- Awards: Order of the Crown; Order of the Star of Romania; Order of Michael the Brave, 3rd Class; Order of Saint Sava

Military service
- Branch/service: Army
- Years of service: 1907–1947
- Rank: General
- Commands: 4th Corps (1941–1943); 4th Army (1943–1944)
- Battles/wars: Second Balkan War; World War I; World War II; Battle of Odessa; Battle of Stalingrad

Constantin Sănătescu (14 January 1885 – 8 November 1947) was a Romanian general and statesman who served as the 44th Prime Minister of Romania after the 23 August 1944 coup after which Romania left the Axis powers and joined the Allies.

== Early life and military career ==
Sănătescu was born on January 14, 1885, in Craiova. He was the son of the infantry lieutenant Gheorghe Sănătescu (1858–1942), a future general. He graduated from the School of Sons of Soldiers in Iași (1905), then attended the Military School of Infantry and Cavalry in Bucharest (September 1, 1905 – July 1, 1907). He attended military school in the same class with future Generals Gheorghe Mihail and Nicolae Macici, being promoted after graduation to the rank of second lieutenant (July 1, 1907) and assigned to the 5th Roșiori Regiment. Sănătescu was promoted to lieutenant on July 1, 1910, and transferred on October 16 as an instructing officer to the Military School of Active Cavalry Officers. He obtained the rank of captain on April 1, 1915, and was appointed first as the commander of the squadron of the 10th Călărași Regiment and then in the 7th Roșiori Regiment. He fought against Bulgaria during the Second Balkan War (1913).

== First World War ==
Captain Sănătescu took part in the battles of the First World War and was promoted to the rank of major on September 1, 1917. From February 15, 1918, he served in the staff of the 16th Infantry Division, then was transferred to the General Staff, and later became an instructor at the Military School of Active Cavalry Officers.

== Interwar period ==
He then attended the Higher War School (April 1, 1919 – November 1, 1920), being assigned to the General Staff after graduation. He was promoted to the rank of lieutenant colonel on April 1, 1921. On November 2, 1926, he was transferred to the General Secretariat of the Ministry of War and on July 1, 1927, he was promoted to colonel.

Colonel Sănătescu was appointed on May 5, 1928, as a military attaché in the Romanian Legation in London, where he remained for two years until June 30, 1930. After returning to Romania, he was entrusted with the command of the Mounted Guards Regiment. He was appointed the Chief of Staff of the General Inspectorate of the Cavalry on October 1, 1933. After a year, he returned to the General Staff, and on June 15, 1935, he became the commander of the 3rd Cavalry Brigade. He was promoted to the rank of brigadier general on October 16, 1935.

After two years in command, he was appointed on November 1, 1937, as Deputy Chief of the General Staff and fulfilled the position during the term of Major General Ștefan Ionescu. From May to December 1939, he served as director of the National Military Circle. On February 27, 1939, shortly after the replacement on February 1 of General Ionescu with General Țenescu as Chief of the General Staff, Sănătescu passed to the command of the 3rd Cavalry Division and was promoted on October 25 to the rank of major general. He then held the positions of commander of the 8th Army Corps, commander of the Cavalry Corps, commander of the Military Command of the Capital during the Legionnaires' rebellion and commander of the 4th Army Corps (1941–1943). As commander of the 8th Army Corps, it was General Sănătescu who stopped the Pogrom from Dorohoi against the Jews that was launched in 1940.

== Second World War ==
When Romania joined the Second World War on June 22, 1941, Sănătescu was the commanding officer of the 4th Army Corps. He participated for two years in the battles on the Eastern Front, standing out in the Battle of Odessa and the Battle of Stalingrad. He was decorated on November 7, 1941, with the Order of the Star of Romania with swords in the rank of Grand Officer with the ribbon of Military Virtue "for the dexterity with which he led the troops of the Army Corps in the battle of Odessa. Acting with all his might, he definitively defeated the enemy resistance in the South Tătarca region, entering Odessa." He was promoted to the rank of Army Corps General on January 24, 1942.

In March 1943, he was called from the front and appointed head of the Royal Military House (March 20, 1943 – January 24, 1944) and then Marshal of the Palace (April 1, 1944 – August 23, 1944). He participated in several meetings with civilians and soldiers close to the Royal House who planned the overthrow of the Antonescu regime, Romania's exit from the anti-Soviet war and turning around the weapons against Nazi Germany.

On August 23, 1944, King Michael I dismissed and arrested Marshal Ion Antonescu. Sănătescu was one of the organizers of the 1944 coup d'état and was a close friend of the king. That evening, Sănătescu was appointed President of the Council of Ministers and formed a military cabinet in which the leaders of the four parties that had supported King Michael had one representative without a portfolio. The Communist Lucrețiu Pătrășcanu also held the position of interim minister of justice.

The Sănătescu government was entrusted with the important mission of consolidating the coup by repelling the attack of the German contingents in the country. In the battles between August 24 and August 31, a large part of Romania was liberated, but the Soviet Union de facto occupied the country. The appointment of Sănătescu to head the government was made official by a royal decree, which was issued only on September 1, 1944.

The Sănătescu government sent a delegation consisting of Prince Barbu A. Știrbey, General Dumitru Dămăceanu, Lucrețiu Pătrășcanu, and Ghiță Popp to negotiate and sign the Armistice Convention in Moscow with the United Nations. The Russians delayed receiving the delegation until their army had fully occupied the Romanian territory. The deed was signed on September 12. On September 15, a working meeting took place between members of the Sănătescu government and participants in the signing of the armistice during which Iuliu Maniu observed that Romania's negotiators had to "accept points that represent a real capitulation, not a free Armistice contract." Also, on September 12, 1944, at the energetic intervention of Sănătescu, Anton Buga, who had been sentenced to death, was released.

On November 4, 1944, the Second Sănătescu cabinet was formed, led by General Sănătescu. The cabinet faced the challenges of the Romanian Communist Party, supported by the Soviet Union, which requested that it be granted two strategic ministries, the Ministry of Interior and the Ministry of War. Losing the trust of the leaders of the liberal and peasant parties, which perceived him as too moderate towards the communists, Sănătescu submitted his resignation on December 2, 1944.

Sănătescu was promoted to the rank of general on December 6, 1944. He then served as Chief of the Romanian General Staff (December 11, 1944 – June 20, 1945), developing the battle plans of the Romanian Army and leading the military operations until the final defeat of Germany.

After the end of the war, General Sănătescu served for a period as inspector general of the army.

== Death ==
Sănătescu died of cancer in 1947 in Bucharest, and was buried at Bellu Cemetery. He was the last general of the Romanian Army buried with full honours according to his rank.

== Medals ==
Sănătescu was decorated with numerous Romanian and foreign decorations and medals, including:

- Order of the Crown, in the rank of Grand Officer with military insignia (May 9, 1941)
- Order of the Star of Romania with swords in the rank of Grand Officer with ribbon of "Military Virtue" (November 7, 1941)
- Order of Michael the Brave with swords, cl. III
- Order of Saint Sava

and a number of other decorations.

== Notes ==
Political offices
Preceded by Ion Antonescu	Prime Minister of Romania; August 23, 1944 – December 2, 1944	Succeeded by Nicolae Rădescu
