= Socialist Peasants' Party =

Socialist Peasants' Party Partidul Socialist Țărănesc
- Leader: Mihai Ralea
- Founded: 1938; 1943 (reestablishment)
- Dissolved: November 30, 1944
- Split from: National Peasants' Party
- Merged into: National Renaissance Front (1938); Ploughmen's Front (1944)
- Headquarters: 8 Sfântul Constantin Street, Bucharest, Kingdom of Romania
- Newspaper: Dezrobirea
- Ideology: Socialism (Marxism); Agrarianism; Corporatism; Antifascism
- Political position: Far-left
- National affiliation: National-Democratic Coalition; Patriotic Antihitlerite Front; National Democratic Front

The Socialist Peasants' Party (Romanian: Partidul Socialist Țărănesc, or Partidul Socialist Țărănist, PSȚ) was a short-lived political party in Romania, presided over by the academic Mihai Ralea. Created nominally in 1938 but dissolved soon after, it reemerged during World War II. A clandestine group, it opposed the fascist regime of Ion Antonescu, although its own roots were planted in authoritarian politics. Looking to the Soviet Union for inspiration, the PSȚ was cultivated by the Romanian Communist Party (PCdR), and comprised a faction of radicalized social democrats, under Lothar Rădăceanu.

Perceived as a communist tool, the PSȚ was prevented by other parties from participating in the August 23 Coup against Antonescu. It entered its legal phase in the late months of 1944, but was soon absorbed into the more powerful Ploughmen's Front.

== Roots ==
Ralea entered politics as one of the National Peasants' Party (PNȚ) intellectuals in Iași, before his 1938 move to Bucharest. In this context, he was a prominent figure in the centrist faction of the party, with Armand Călinescu as his ally. A political and social theorist, he endorsed the PNȚ's agrarian-and-corporatist notion of a "peasant state", against the social-democratic wing of the party. As scholar Angela Harre notes, Ralea and other PNȚ leaders "tried to use the vague picture of a peasant state to counterbalance the growing fascist impact on society with an alternative democratic state model." During that time, Ralea had established contacts with the outlawed Communist Party, and already supported its antifascist agenda. PCdR contacts viewed him as one of the "bourgeois personalities with antifascist views."

By the 1937 election, which saw pro-democratic parties unable to maintain a clear majority, the "peasant state" doctrine looked set to crumble. Harre argues: "A corporatist democracy became obsolete from the middle of the 1930s on, when the strongly polarized Romanian society did not resist the split between urban modernity and a rural traditional way of life any longer." In 1938, Ralea was editor of the National Peasantist organ, Dreptatea, but at odds with PNȚ leader Iuliu Maniu. He broke away from the party to establish the PSȚ, in name only. According to Corneliu Coposu, at the time a leader of the PNȚ youth, Ralea's party was "stillborn". After King Carol II banned the PNȚ and all other mainstream parties, Ralea transformed himself into a pillar of Carol's authoritarian-corporatist regime. He was highly decorated by the king, and appointed Minister of Labor in March 1938. In this capacity, he worked to fuse all professional bodies into a general union, which was to serve as a pillar for the corporative reorganization of Romania. He also organized the Muncă și Voe Bună leisure service, directly modeled on fascist precedents such as Dopolavoro, and converted the staples of socialist propaganda in support of the FRN.

In late 1938, Carol created a single-party state around the National Renaissance Front (FRN), with Ralea as one of its prominent figures. In 1940, however, the FRN regime was unable to secure Romania against Nazi Germany and the Soviet Union: the country ceded Bessarabia and Northern Transylvania, after which the regime crumbled. It was replaced by the Nazi-aligned National Legionary State, an uneasy partnership between Antonescu and the Iron Guard. The latter made efforts to prosecute figures associated with the FRN, and Ralea was consequently stripped of his academic postings. He was reinstated in 1941, after the clash between the Guard and Antonescu. However, owing to Ralea's communist sympathies, Antonescu ordered his constant surveillance by Siguranța, the country's secret police.

== Reestablishment ==
Ralea's contacts with the PCdR became a nuisance once Romania joined Nazi Germany's war against the Soviet Union. From December 1942 to March 1943, he was interned alongside other dissenters in Târgu Jiu camp. Upon his release, he resumed his contacts with other dissenting academics of Iași—Iorgu Iordan, Constantin Ion Parhon, Gheorghe Vlădescu-Răcoasa—with whom, the Siguranța noted, he intended to start a "political action". It did not materialize into a political movement. During summer 1943, Ralea resumed his contacts with the PNȚ, and was received by Maniu. This interview surprised the mainstream National Peasantists, for whom Ralea was a pariah (Maniu himself had implied that Ralea had "not a trace of character"). According to Coposu, Maniu reminded Ralea of his 1938 defection, and rejected his offer to rejoin the "democratic opposition" to Antonescu. Maniu suggested instead that Ralea and other "former supporters of Carol II" create their own "antihitlerite combat front, independent from the consistently democratic elements". He appreciated Ralea's rejection of Antonescu's "catastrophic orientation" and commitment to "the country's salvation", but noted that they could only buy him a measure of leniency "for that hour when we shall be evaluating the past mistakes that have thrown this country into dejection." Poet and political commentator Tudor Arghezi recounted the incident as follows:

Mihail [sic] Ralea, a lover of velvet pajamas and elegant communism, on top of his FRN uniform, asked to join Maniu as a far-leftist factor, [but] "The Chief" said no.

During late 1943, Ralea and other dissident National Peasantists were in Brașov, where they began referring to themselves as a distinct Socialist Peasants' Party, and worked closely with an antifascist economist and doctrinaire, Victor Jinga. With a mandate from the PCdR, Ralea also approached Petru Groza of the Ploughmen's Front (FP) and Gheorghe Tătărescu, the former premier and leader of the National Liberal Party (PNL), who had already publicized their opposition to Antonescu's foreign policy. The newly (re)established PSȚ, also known as "Socialist Union of Workers and Peasants", was soon joined by Rădăceanu. The latter, formerly a figure of importance in the Social Democratic Party (PSDR), had earlier established his own clandestine Marxist faction. By the time of his recruitment, Rădăceanu was suspected of running errands for German businessmen, and as such criticized as a collaborator. Another figure of relative importance was Stanciu Stoian, himself a PNȚ defector, who was doubly affiliated with another underground force, the Union of Patriots.

According to historian Adrian Cioroianu, the Socialist Peasants' Party, "entirely minor", had a "ghostly" existence under Antonescu's rule. It soon approached the PCdR and, represented by Ralea and Stoian, accepted inclusion into the "Patriotic Antihitlerite Front". Journalist Victor Frunză claimed the latter was also a shady organization, also deeming the very existence (beyond the adoption of a name) doubtful. However, according to the same author, Rădăceanu and Ralea were among the PCdR's more credible outside sympathizers: "they moved to the left of the left for reasons of a personal predisposition toward totalitarianism."

== Antihitlerite Front ==
Alongside the PNȚ, PSDR, and National Liberals, the Communists were called in to organize the August 23 Coup against Antonescu. An understanding was reached in March 1944, when the four groups set up a National Democratic Bloc (BND). The PCdR, marginally relevant in this alliance, tried to extend his influence by obtaining seats for the "Antihitlerite" parties: Ralea's PSȚ, Groza's FP, and the Union of Patriots (UP). The move was vetoed by the mainstream parties. During a new meeting with Ralea, Maniu also rejected the PSȚ offer to reunite or align itself with the PNȚ. On May 24, 1944, the PSȚ also entered a "National-Democratic Coalition", formed around the National Liberal Party–Tătărescu, which had a platform of loyalism toward King Michael I and "active political collaboration with the Soviets." It also comprised Groza's Front, the UP, the PSDR, MADOSZ, and remnants of the Democratic Nationalist Party, under Petre Topa.

Ralea and his group continued to campaign on their own. A Siguranța report of June 27 mentions that the PSȚ had received pledges and support from leftists such as Demostene Botez, Scarlat Callimachi, N. D. Cocea, and D. I. Suchianu. In July 1944, Jinga produced a manifesto for the post-Antonescu era, prophesying a socialized economy and liberal democracy. According to the PNȚ's historian Gabriel Țepelea, this text was mostly authored as a National Peasantist manifesto by Alexandru Herlea, and almost fully plagiarized by Ralea. The latter had by then lost the support of Rădăceanu and his followers, who returned to the PSDR as a distinctly pro-communist inner-party faction. A PSȚ man, Grigore Geamănu, still had a significant part to play in the preparation of the coup, helping PCdR's Gheorghe Gheorghiu-Dej to break out of Târgu Jiu camp.

The BND then put an end to Antonescu's regime, aligning Romania with the Allied Powers, but also led the way for the Soviet occupation of Romania. The PSȚ emerged into legality on September 2, one of the seven parties mentioned by Premier Constantin Sănătescu in his decree on the transition to democracy. The central offices and Studies Circle were located at 8 Sfântul Constantin Street, downtown Bucharest. At a national level, the PSȚ began putting out a daily newspaper, Dezrobirea ("Liberation"), publicized Jinga's July manifesto as a PSȚ party program. Dezrobirea also praised Ralea's own antifascism, and claimed for the PSȚ a pedigree of "more than six years" of ideological combat. As noted by historian Lucian Boia, such statements may imply that Ralea wished to present his FRN activity and his pro-communism as a coherent whole.

By September 5, the PSȚ had formed a distinct chapter in Ilfov County, with Stoian elected as its chairman. On September 10, Jinga met Ralea in Bucharest. According to Ralea, he agreed to merge his Brașov-based movement, the Socialist Circle Group (GCS), into the larger party; this also meant that Jinga's newspaper, Țara de Mâine ("Land of Tomorrow") was a PSȚ regional mouthpiece. This account was refuted by Jinga, who argued that the GCS, although similar in purpose to the PSȚ, would maintain full independence. In tandem, the PSȚ grew to include other figures formerly associated with the FRN including Mihail Ghelmegeanu, Octav Livezeanu, and Tudor Vianu (chairman of the National Theater Bucharest). A press release of September 10 also credited as "party eminences" Colonel Petre Petrescu, doctor Radu Olteanu, and lawyer Gheorghe Tomoșoiu. The party also received into its ranks Ralea's student, poet Teohar Mihadaș, who was hiding his earlier involvement with the Iron Guard.

Almost immediately, Ralea's party was co-opted on other PCdR-controlled alliances. The "Antihitlerite Front" was formalized on September 6, when it denounced the alliance with the PNȚ and the PNL, and published its appeal to the populace on September 17. The following day, Geamănu represented his group at the UP-organized rally "for the destruction of internal Hitlerism", where he expressed the PSȚ's support for the agenda. The Front then transformed itself into a broader "National Democratic Front", in stated opposition to Sănătescu's government. As members of this coalition, the FP and the Socialist Peasantists had a particularly close relationship. Ralea's activity, and especially his self-presentation as an anti-Hitlerite, were followed with disdain by the National Peasantists. On September 22, Dreptatea noted that Sănătescu had just repealed one of Ralea's labor laws from the FRN period, under provisions which nullified "fascist" legislation: "Here is Mr Ralea the democrat, who had produced a fascist law".

== Disestablishment and aftermath ==
On November 30, 1944, the PSȚ was absorbed into the FP. Addressing his followers on that occasion, Ralea noted that the day had come for the establishment of a single "political organism of the peasantry", which would maintain its "alliance with the proletarian forces in this country". The FP leader, Groza, became Prime Minister of a communist-aligned cabinet in which Ralea was Arts Minister; he would later serve as Ambassador to the United States, while Stoian became Minister of Religious Affairs. Already by 1945, former PSȚ politicians were manifesting their opposition to communization. Soviet advisers noted with concern that Ghelmegeanu was influencing Groza to unseal his agreements with the PCdR. During his time as a diplomat, Ralea pressed the Americans to intervene in Romania and balance out Soviet influence, as a guarantee against the collectivization of peasant property. Serving as Romanian ambassador to Socialist Yugoslavia, Vianu engaged in a debate with the PSDR defectors Ștefan Baciu and Șerban Voinea, reportedly informing them that Romania's future was "not that bleak". Vianu argued that Groza would still maintain government positions for "[Ralea's] faction and other non-communist elements."

Returning to Romania after the full imposition of a communist regime, Ralea was awarded a seat in the Great National Assembly with the formal elections of 1948. By 1949, the Securitate secret police was clamping down on some less loyal PSȚ members. Mihadaș had established contacts with the anticommunist maquis and Western countries. He was arrested and tortured, being forced to invent a conspiracy that dragged into it various members of the political and literary underworld. Ralea himself was placed under Securitate surveillance, once he began expressing his mistrust of the Communist Party. His Securitate file lists him as an "opportunistic element, a danger to our regime." Ghelmegeanu and Vianu were also marginalized, while Suchianu was arrested and imprisoned. Throughout the late 1950s and early '60s, Ralea maintained cordial relations with the communist leader, Gheorghiu-Dej, and backed the regime's gradual adoption of nationalist principles. He died in 1964, a member of the Romanian Council of State.
