= Muncă și Voe Bună =

Romanian state-run workers' leisure organization (1938-1940)

Work and Good Cheer
- Muncă și Voe Bună
- MVB Logo
- Founder: Mihai Ralea
- Dates active: 1938-1940
- Country: Romania
- Allegiance: Carol II of Romania
- Headquarters: Bucharest
- Newspaper: Muncă și Voe Bună Magazine
- Ideology: Monarchism; Carol II of Romania's cult of personality
- Status: Dissolved
- Part of: National Renaissance Front

Muncă și Voe Bună (English: Work and Good Cheer – MVB) was a Romanian state-run workers' socio-cultural leisure and service and organization active between 1938 and 1940, elaborated by social scientist Mihai Ralea under King Carol II's royal dictatorship. It was modeled after Nazi Germany’s Gemeinschaft Kraft durch Freude (English: Strength Through Joy – KdF) and Fascist Italy’s Opera Nazionale Dopolavoro (English: National Afterwork Club – OND).

== Context ==
Carol’s dictatorship began with the adoption of the 1938 Constitution, a largely authoritarian constitution that granted the king extended prerogatives, and it intensified with the creation of the National Renaissance Front, established with the purpose of creating a one-party corporatist system. A series of reforms in the field of labor followed.

Syndicates were abolished and replaced, according to the corporatist model, with guilds of workers, private employees, and craftsmen by the decree-law of 12 October 1938, granting them the right to "vertical" representation in the Parliament. At the same time, a decree-law was enacted to establish a minimum wage for private enterprises.

=== Creation and scope of the service ===
Interest in workers' leisure time in Romania at the end of the 1930s arose in response to the broader European trend of organizing vacations for the working class. The program of Muncă și Voie Bună aligned with this European and international trend. The issue of workers' free time had already been raised in the early interwar years, with the adoption of a draft convention on the eight-hour workday at the first session of the International Labor Conference held in Washington in 1919.

MVB flag, in use between 1938 and 1940.

The service originated in the summer of 1938, when the Council of Ministers authorized the creation of a leisure organization for workers under the name Muncă și Voe Bună. Its legal framework and organizational structure were later formalized through Royal Decree no. 520 of 20 February 1940, signed by King Carol II, Minister of Labor Mihail Ralea and the President of the Council of Ministers, Gheorghe Tătărescu.

Its scope was the instruction and cultivation of workers, as well as the efficient organization of their leisure time. It was part of a broader cultural program under Carol's dictatorship and played an important role in the political indoctrination of workers and in securing their loyalty—the segment of society most exposed to Bolshevik influence, which the Romanian government had been trying to counter since the 1920s.

In a similar manner, Carol organized the youth into the paramilitary organization Straja Țării (English: The Sentinel of the Motherland), which had been active since 1935 and featured extensive sports and scouting programs, as well as military training, intended to shape their political beliefs and promote his cult of personality. Straja Țării was reorganized after 3 December 1938 precisely for this purpose.

== Structure, subordinated institutions and activity ==
The Muncă și Voie Bună service was placed under the jurisdiction of the General Directorate of Labor (subordinated to the Ministry of Labor), with responsibilities for organizing and coordinating workers' theater, workers' libraries and publications, and the creation of workers' universities where lectures could be held. It was also tasked with overseeing and organizing activities related to cinematography and radio broadcasting, music, sports and physical education, tourism, and excursions.

Workers' leisure activities after work were organized through "summer colonies" during the summer months, subsidized by the Ministry of Labor. In an article by Stavri Cunescu (father of Sergiu Cunescu), Secretary of State in the Ministry of Labor under Mihail Ralea, it was noted that: "These colonies are regularly organized during the summer months for apprentices from workshops and factories who need rest and recuperation. […] There, they find not only fresh air and adequate nutrition, but also games, songs, and a form of sentinel-like education."

"The organization Muncă și Voie Bună is the Romanian reflex, adapted to our needs and customs, common to our era, created to offer those who have limited access the benefits of material goods and spiritual values.", stated Mihail Ralea in an article published in the Cele Trei Crișuri magazine.

=== Muncă și Voe Bună Magazine ===
Muncă și Voe Bună was a biweekly cultural magazine published by the Ministry of Labor, with Mihail Sadoveanu as director and Octav Livezeanu as editor. It was a publication of the Carol II Press Trust. The magazine was published in Bucharest, with its editorial office and administration located at 8 Calomfirescu Street, 5th floor.

The priest Ioan Marina (the future Patriarch Justinian) collaborated with Mihail Sadoveanu and Octav Livezeanu in founding the Muncă și Voe Bună magazine, contributing the section dedicated to the Church titled "Pentru suflet" (English: For the soul).

From 1941 onwards, it was replaced by Muncitorul Național Român (English: The Romanian National Worker).

=== Muncă și Voe Bună Workers' Libraries ===
The creation of workers' libraries was one of the first projects launched by the MVB in 1938. For this purpose, an inventory of suitable books was made, and over time no fewer than 25,870 volumes were bought.

=== Muncă și Voe Bună Radio Station ===
In October 1938, MVB launched its own radio program, Ora Muncă și Voe Bună (English: The Work and Good Cheer Hour). Coordinated by Alexandru Marcu and broadcast on Radio Bucharest, the program had a propagandistic role, aiming to strengthen public cohesion around Carol II's regime and to appeal to different groups of workers.

=== Muncă și Voe Bună Workers' University ===
The Workers' University opened its courses on 6 November 1938 in Bucharest, under the direction of Tudor Vianu. Classes were held at several locations, including the Apprentices' Dormitory "Obor" (where it was inaugurated), the C.F.R. Highschool "Aurel Vlaicu", the Apprentices' Dormitory "Principesa Maria", and the Workers' Canteen on Splaiul Independenței. Branches were also planned in Sibiu County and Chișinău County.

The first academic year (1938-39) offered courses in Romanian literature, new methods and techniques in industry, labor history, labor legislation, scientific organization of work, accident prevention, industrial and social hygiene, as well as Romanian civilization, social economy, social history, public law, political and economic geography, publishing and bookselling, and historical trades and commerce.

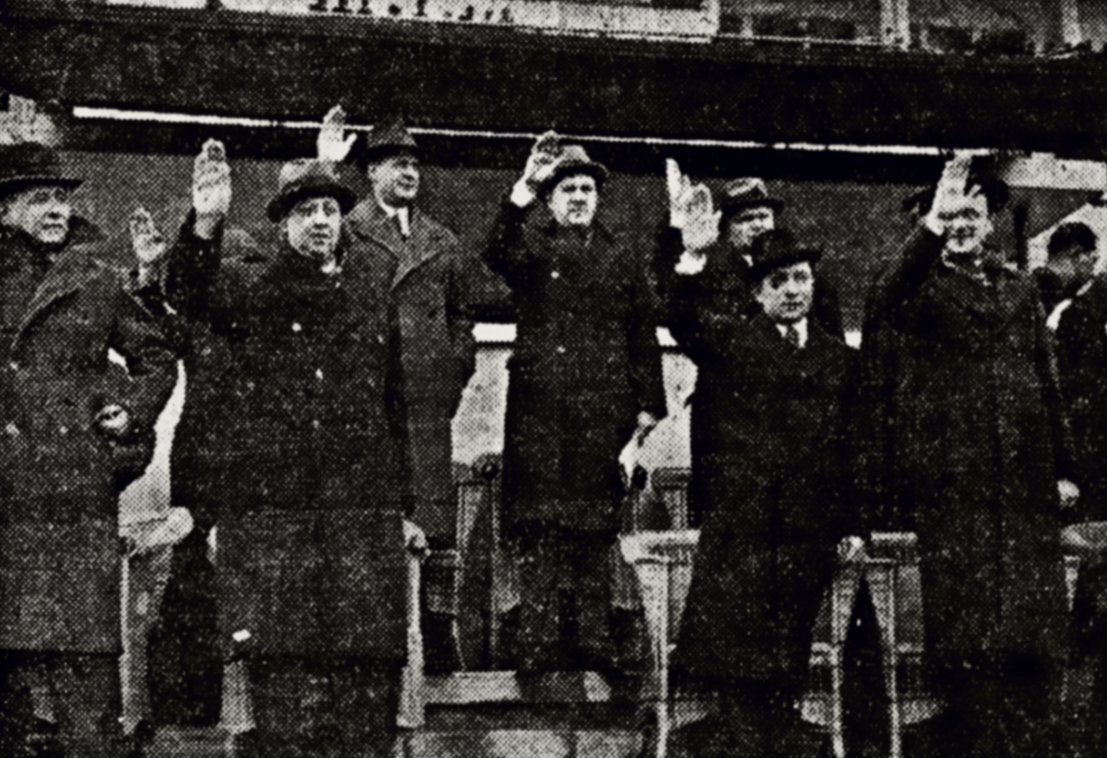
Romanian Labor Minister Mihai Ralea (back row, center) with the staff of Muncă și Voe Bună, giving the Roman salute at ANEF Stadium in Bucharest; D. I. Suchianu is visible, front row, second from the right.

=== Muncă și Voe Bună Workers' Theater ===
The Muncă și Voie Bună Theatre opened on 14 December 1938 in Bucharest. Mihail Ralea noted that its main purpose was to promote social and cultural values (in reference to Carol's ideological views and Romanian state policies) rather than purely artistic goals.

Directed by Victor Ion Popa from 1938 to 1944, the theatre became one of four state-supported theatres in the capital. It aimed to stage daily performances in Bucharest and take monthly tours to the country's most important industrial centers. In its first ten months, it held 726 shows, including matinées for children. The theatre also supported amateur groups by providing guidance, materials, and actors, as well as a library of translated plays.

=== Muncă și Voe Bună International Exposition ===
Inspired by the German model, the International Exposition Muncă și Voie Bună was opened on 20 June 1939 in Bucharest, in Carol II Park by Lake Herăstrău, with each country having its own pavilion. The event was organized with the support of the Ministry of Labor and brought together participants from France, Italy, Germany, Greece, and Bulgaria. Several invited countries—including England, Poland, Belgium, Sweden, Portugal, Yugoslavia, and Turkey—did not take part, although they announced that they would send delegates, and in some cases documentary material on the management of workers' leisure time.

The Romanian pavilion reflected one year of activity of the Muncă și Voie Bună service, and was created with the collaboration of the Straja Țării and the Social Service.

== Rebranding ==
Carol II's royal dictatorship ended with his forced abdication in favor of his son, Michael I, imposed by Marshal Ion Antonescu in the autumn of 1940. It was succeeded by Antonescu's military dictatorship, which initially collaborated briefly with the Iron Guard but later suppressed it following the Legionary Rebellion, establishing Antonescu as the sole leader.

During the existence of the short-lived National Legionary State under the dual rule of the Iron Guard and Antonescu, the organization changed its name from Muncă și Voie Bună to Luptă și Lumină (English: Fight and Light) and, particularly under wartime conditions, no longer displayed the pageantry of 1938-40, although it continued its activities until 1944. Its subordinate institutions adopted similar names.

== Impact ==
Adelina Ștefan, a researcher at the National Council for the Study of the Securitate Archives, argues that the MVB had little impact on interwar Romanian workers and may have later served as an inspiration for the Romanian communist authorities after 1948. On the other hand, journalist and political analyst Ion Cristoiu dismisses the entire MVB as merely a "propaganda fuss" of Carol II, evoking the Muncă și Voie Bună International Exposition as an example.
