= National psychology =

Psychological perception of a nation

National psychology refers to the (real or alleged) distinctive psychological make-up of particular nations, ethnic groups or peoples, and to the comparative study of those characteristics in social psychology, sociology, political science and anthropology.

The assumption of national psychology is that different ethnic groups, or the people living in a national territory, are characterized by a distinctive "mix" of human attitudes, values, emotions, motivation and abilities which is culturally reinforced by language, the family, schooling, the state and the media.

== As a scientific discipline ==
According to the German pioneer psychologist Wilhelm Wundt, the attempt to theorize scientifically about national psychology dates from the mid-19th century. In post-1871 Germany, but especially during the Third Reich, some German professors of linguistics and literature tried to influence English studies with a politically motivated "cultural science", which Ernst Leisi called the "Nationalpsychologische Methode." This paradigm presented a new view of contemporary and past English, on the basis of analogies drawn between specific linguistic traits, practices and constituents of the English (and German) national character. But in reality it amounted to little more than a repetition of preconceived notions of otherness. Around 1900, national psychology had become an accepted topic of study in the social sciences, at universities in Europe and North America.

== Use ==
National psychology plays a role in politics via the ideology of nationalism. Politicians will appeal e.g. to "the French people", "the American people", the "Russian people", the idea being that members of a nation have a common national identity, are part of a national community, and share common interests (the "national interest"). Politicians must try to unify and integrate people to work together for common goals, and appealing to their common national characteristics is often part of that.

Closely related is the idea of the national character which refers to the values, norms and customs which people of a nation typically hold, their typical emotional responses, and what they regard as virtue and vice – all factors which determine how they will habitually respond to situations.

Nationalism aims to unite people as members of a nation, and for that purpose, the belief that they really have common national characteristics is obviously useful, even if those common characteristics cannot be proved beyond a shared language and a similar physical appearance. Friendly rivalry between national sports teams is often used to symbolize national identity, or to express patriotism. For example, in South Africa sport is "the national religion. Transcending race, politics or language group, sport unites the country – and not just the male half of it."

National psychology has sometimes been used to explain why economic development occurred in a different way in different countries, or why a particular turn of political events happened as it did.

Reference is sometimes made to the "national psyche" or the "soul" of a nation, to explain why some public events can trigger a commotion or uproar in a country, or why a particular nation gets particularly enthusiastic or obsessed with a sport or cultural practice.

The idea is that a nation shares a specific cultural mentality, morality or mindset, embedded in its language and institutions, which causes it to react much more strongly, or much less strongly, to particular situations than people of other nations would, and that people from different nations have different problem-solving strategies.

== Criticism of the concept ==
However, the validity of the idea of a "national psychology" has been strongly criticized, for political, moral and scientific reasons.

Part of the problem is also that researchers usually interpret another culture from the point of view of the culture they are used to (regarded as "normal"). Even if many people in a country share a common psychological or biological characteristic, other people in that country may not share that characteristic at all. The important ways in which people differ may outweigh the common characteristics which they can all be proved to share.

Psychologists have found in research that when subjects are asked to identify the ethnicity or nationality of individuals by observing a line-up of different people, they cannot accurately recognize what their ethnicity or nationality is. Marketing and Media experts have found that at most people can identify a representative stereotype, archetype or caricature which symbolises a particular ethnic group, or characteristic ways of relating which a nation has.

Some additional complications are, that:

- the mentality of a nation may change over time, through shared experiences, and therefore that the characteristics which are thought to be "typical" of a nation may change over time. In modern society, often the young generation no longer identifies with the ways of the old generation, including their ideas of national identity and norms.
- large-scale international migration of peoples from different nations means that immigrants take on part of the habits and culture of the country to which they move, while also retaining part of their original culture. In this way, different national cultures are merged or mixed, and a new culture may be formed which has no clear "national" identification. This, together with the growth of international tourism, also means that people in one country increasingly adopt customs and habits from other countries, so that a nationally distinctive culture declines.
- When there are fights about identity, when people feel insecure about their identity, or when they try to get their identity accepted by others, a lot of people may claim they have important characteristics in common, or that they differ greatly from others, even although there is in truth little objective evidence for it. A fairly large "national movement" may appear of people sharing a national belief, even although in reality they do not have all that much in common. That is, people's desire to feel that they have something in common, makes them act "as though" it already exists, even though this is not really true.

Because of all these difficulties in defining national psychology, often the most insightful portrayals of it are not really "scientific", but are found rather in the metaphors of fiction, for example in novels and films. These can gives insight into the "typical" emotional and intellectual world of a people, without pretending to apply to all its members.

== Globalization and postmodernity ==
Some writers argue that in the era of globalisation, national or ethnic differences can less and less explain why people behave as they do. Increasingly, it seems that many people do not identify with being part of a nation, and just want to be recognized as a human being with human rights. They might cherish the place where they were born, without however being particularly patriotic. Other writers note that appeals to a national identity can be revived and used as a xenophobic response to perceptions that a country or region is being "taken over" by foreign corporations, or "overrun" by foreign immigrants.

Especially in Europe but also in many other parts of the world, adherence to a religion has strongly declined, and therefore the shared view of morality and human nature which religious authorities previously provided is no longer accepted. Religion has had a very strong influence on the shaping of national identity, and as this influence has declined, it can no longer define a national psychology as it used to. However, in other parts of the world, religions have increased their influence, and then national identity and religious identity may influence each other quite significantly.

In some strands of postmodernism, nations are no longer viewed as legally enforced territories but as imagined communities in which national identification becomes increasingly vaguer. Thus, for example, Michel Foucault claimed that in the West, "the project of the science of the subject has gravitated, in ever-narrowing circles, around the question of sex" (Foucault, The history of sexuality, Vol. 1, Vintage, p. 70). This could be understood to mean that people really identify more with sexuality than nationality nowadays.

Nevertheless, despite controversy, the concept of a "national psychology" still persists, insofar as people can observe practically e.g. through tourism and television that there are definitely differences in the way people live life, and how they think about it, in different countries, quite apart from differences in physical appearance or language. There are nowadays books on the national character of practically every people on earth.

== Modern studies ==
Modern scientific studies of national psychology try to avoid the traps of prejudice and discrimination, mainly focusing fairly strictly on what can actually be measured, tested and proved objectively, but also by taking a positive (or at least neutral) view of national culture. The modern emphasis is on whether systematic patterns of national differences can be genuinely proved to exist, what they are, and how they can be explained. To an important extent, this approach is more successful than the old psychology, because much more attempt is made to verify hypotheses with comprehensive evidence, instead of making speculative guesses, or basing theories on anecdotal evidence. Yet researchers often cannot avoid altogether being drawn into disputes about national sentiments, sometimes making it difficult to stay neutral, detached and objective.

== See also ==
- Acculturation
- Anthony D. Smith
- Ethology
- Ethnology
- Racism
- Meta-ethnicity
- National character studies
