= Opera Nazionale Dopolavoro =

Italian fascist leisure organization

- Formation: 1925
- Dissolved: 1943
- Type: Leisure organization
- Legal status: Defunct, illegal
- Region served: Kingdom of Italy
- Parent organization: National Fascist Party

The National Afterwork Club (Opera Nazionale Dopolavoro, or OND) was the Italian fascist leisure and recreational organization for adults.

== History ==
In April 1925, Italian dictator Benito Mussolini agreed to the fascist unions' demands to set up the OND, with Mario Giani, a former director of Italian Westinghouse, at its head. The trade unions initially saw the provision of leisure facilities for workers as a way to compete with the socialists, who already had a network of cultural organizations. The OND originally had an apolitical and productivist image, helping it gain the support of employers. There was nothing "inherently fascist" about the OND and it had been modelled on institutions like the YMCA. In April 1927, Augusto Turati, the National Fascist Party secretary, dismissed Giani and became OND leader, turning the OND into an auxiliary of the party.

In the 1930s under the direction of Achille Starace the OND became primarily recreational, concentrating on sports and other outings. It is estimated that by 1936 the OND had organized 80% of salaried workers. Nearly 40% of the industrial workforce had been recruited into the Dopolavoro by 1939 and the sports activities proved popular with large numbers of workers. The OND had the largest membership of any of the mass Fascist organizations in Italy.

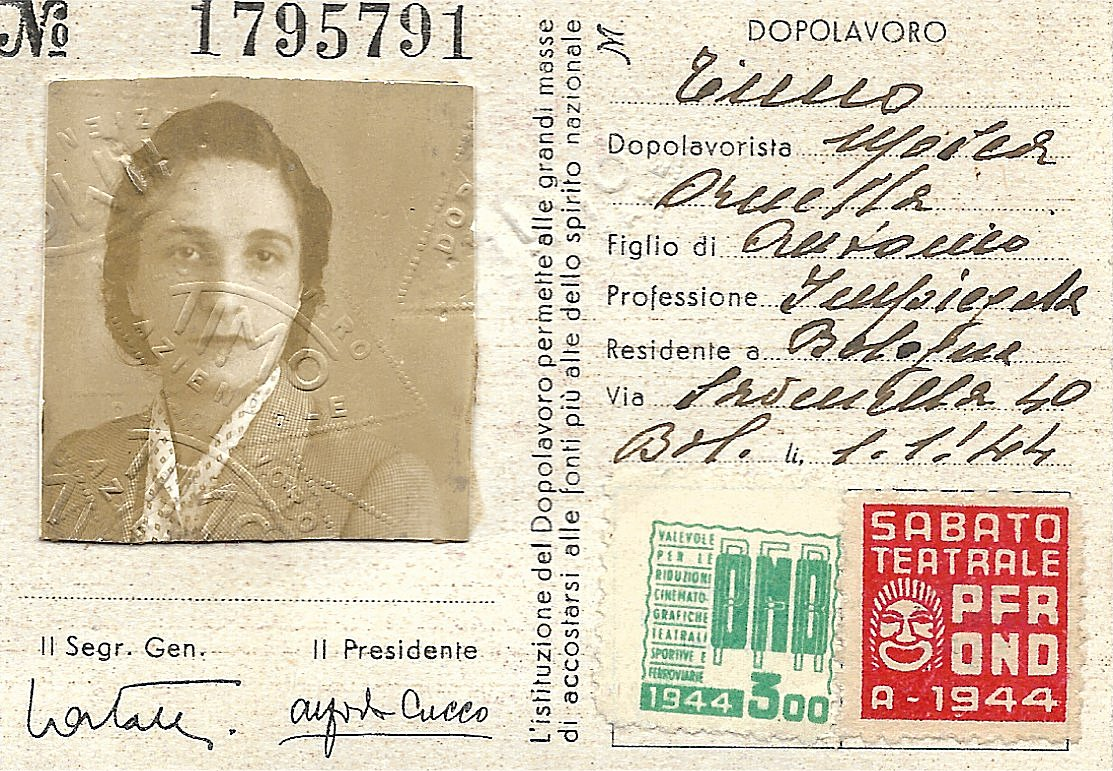
A membership card for the Opera Nazionale Dopolavoro (OND)

== Societal effects ==
The Dopolavoro had little trouble attracting members; according to historian Tobias Asbe, while the activities sponsored by the OND were popular with the working class, these activities "did not turn workers into ideologically convinced supporters of the Fascist regime."

As Adrian Lyttelton wrote, "attempts to use the Dopolavoro as a medium for direct political indoctrination or cultural uplift were usually defeated by the failure of these cadres to use a language which their audience could understand." The organization never achieved the scope or scale of Nazi movements, like the "Strength Through Joy" organization.

=== ONB ===
Another organisation, the Opera Nazionale Balilla (ONB), was widely popular and provided young people with access to clubs, dances, sports facilities, radios, concerts, plays, circuses and outdoor hikes at little or no cost. It sponsored tournaments and sports festivals.

== Leaders ==
- Prince Emanuele Filiberto, Duke of Aosta (1925–27)
- Augusto Turati (1927–30)
- Achille Starace (1930–39)
- Pietro Capoferri (1939–40)

Special Commissioner for the OND:

- Vincenzo Baldazzi (1944–45)

The OND was then changed into the ENAL (Ente nazionale assistenza lavoratori) which was ultimately abolished in 1978.
