= Nicolae Bagdasar =

Romanian philosopher (1896–1971)

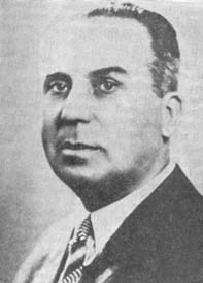
- Born: February 5, 1896; Roșiești, Vaslui County, Kingdom of Romania
- Died: 21 April 1971 (aged 75); Bucharest, Socialist Republic of Romania
- Education: University of Bucharest; University of Berlin
- Occupation: philosopher
- Employers: University of Bucharest; University of Iași
- Relatives: Dumitru Bagdasar (brother)

Nicolae Bagdasar (5 February 1896–21 April 1971) was a Romanian philosopher. Born to a peasant family north of Bârlad, he fought in World War I before attending the University of Bucharest and going on to earn a doctorate in Germany. He entered university teaching at Bucharest in 1928, but did not become a full professor until 1942, when he began teaching the history of philosophy and epistemology at Iași. Rising to Romanian Academy member the following year, he lost this distinction in 1948, under the nascent communist regime, and was removed from teaching in 1949. He spent the remainder of his career in a lower profile, undertaking research in various fields. A well-read scholar, Bagdasar authored the first history of Romanian philosophy, among several noted texts. Both in the interwar period and during World War II, he was involved in running publishing houses, with the latter stint incurring disfavor from the communist authorities.

== Biography ==
=== Early life and education ===
Born into a family of Armenian origin in Roșiești, a village in the former Fălciu County, his parents were Iancu Bagdasar and his wife Smaranda (née Aftenie). Another six siblings were born after him, and his mother died giving birth to her twelfth child, in 1911. His parents were affluent peasants at the top of village society; his father served five consecutive terms as mayor, amounting to twenty years. His mother was illiterate, but valued education and urged all her children to study. As he thought the teacher in Roșiești to be incompetent, his father sent Nicolae to attend primary school in nearby Idrici village, together with his older brother Dumitru, to whom he was very attached. He then entered the prestigious Gheorghe Roșca Codreanu High School in Bârlad, graduating in 1916. He began publishing in Neamul Românesc magazine in 1915, while still a student, signing as Bărdescu. While in Bârlad, he supported himself through tutoring.

In October 1916, shortly after Romania entered World War I, he began studying at the reserve officers' school in Botoșani. From spring 1917 to March 1918, he fought on the front as a student master sergeant. He later recalled his wartime experiences in Amintiri. Notații autobiografice, pointing out the absurdity and uselessness of many of the army's actions. He found that officers, rather than judging based on circumstances, hid behind regulations, and that the troops' activities were subject to little real oversight. In October 1918, near the war's end, he enrolled in the literature and philosophy faculty of the University of Bucharest, graduating in 1922. Initially intending to study sociology, he changed his mind when he found that his professor Ion A. Rădulescu-Pogoneanu did not know the material. Bagdasar then opted for the history of philosophy, taught by a youthful Mircea Florian, whom he found erudite. While a student, he was an editor for Gazeta Transilvaniei, a newspaper based in Brașov, in the newly acquired Transylvania region. Following graduation and with the help of Mihai Popovici, he earned a scholarship at the University of Berlin, where he studied from 1922 to 1926. At Berlin, he took courses with Carl Stumpf, Heinrich Maier and Max Dessoir, and was active in the Kant-Gesellschaft society. He also acquired a solid grounding in Kantianism. He took his doctorate in 1926; it was titled Der Begriff des theoretischen Wertes bei Rickert ("The Notion of Theoretical Value in Rickert").

=== Early career in education ===
Upon his return from Germany in September 1926, he was unable to find a university post, but was asked by the Public Instruction Ministry to teach German at the Romanian commercial school in Thessaloniki. He immediately accepted a job as substitute professor, teaching in the Greek city from that November until the following April. After his return home and until 1930, Bagdasar taught at the Nicolae Krețulescu Commercial School in Bucharest; he also worked for ten years at the private Prince Carol high school. From autumn 1928 to spring 1930, he was a librarian at Dimitrie Gusti's Romanian Social Institute.

Bagdasar was able to enter university teaching in 1928: thanks to the insistence of department chairman Constantin Rădulescu-Motru, he was named assistant psychotechnician in the experimental psychology laboratory of the University of Bucharest. A year later, he agreed to teach a course on logic at a reduced salary. His acceptance was reluctant, as he did not wish to upset course professor Nae Ionescu, who could attack him in Cuvântul newspaper. In 1929, he thus became assistant lecturer of logic and epistemology, and remained in the post until 1941. He taught logic to preparatory-year students and epistemology to students in the other years. In 1938, when the department was restructured, he stopped teaching for two years and entered a competition for a history of philosophy post at Cernăuți University, but was not hired. In early 1940, he was drawn into a plagiarism scandal involving Alexandru Posescu, who a year earlier had published an introduction to philosophy at Bagdasar's printing press. In late 1939, Nicolae Tatu accused Posescu of plagiarizing P. P. Negulescu; Posescu sued Tatu in January 1940, and also named Bagdasar as the moral author of the allegations against him. Bagdasar was ultimately cleared in 1945.

=== Maturity and later years ===
After Rădulescu-Motru was forced to retire in October 1940, during the National Legionary State, Bagdasar became assistant to Ion Petrovici, who had recently transferred to Bucharest from the University of Iași. In December 1941, he was named administrator of Casa Școalelor, the Culture Ministry's publishing house. In the summer of 1942, he became a professor at Iași, in the history of modern and contemporary philosophy, epistemology and metaphysics department, within the literature and philosophy faculty. The move was facilitated by Petrovici, by then Education Minister. He retained this post until March 1949, when, following the education reform enacted by the early communist regime the previous year, he was assigned to be a scientific adviser at the Bucharest-based Institute of History and Philosophy. Politically uninvolved and left-leaning, his relations with Rădulescu-Motru and Petrovici, as well as his work at Casa Școalelor, probably contributed to his removal. Meanwhile, in May 1943, upon the motion of Rădulescu-Motru, he was elected a corresponding member of the Romanian Academy. When the communist authorities revamped the academy in 1948, he was stripped of membership. In 1970, he was elected to the Academy of Social and Political Sciences.

From 1949 to 1950, Bagdasar's work focused on the history of Romanian philosophy; he was then transferred to the history section of the academy's Iași chapter, where he researched the history of Romanian literature. While there, he co-directed Ethos magazine with Ștefan Bârsănescu. Moving back to Bucharest in 1956, he delivered a eulogy the following March at Bellu Cemetery for Rădulescu-Motru. He was somewhat marginalized during the 1950s and experienced a certain degree of poverty. He received a salary raise when he came to the national capital to work on Dicționarul explicativ al limbii române, but continued riding the tramway second class for a year, and bought black bread rather than baguettes. Bagdasar died in 1971. Streets in Bârlad and Focșani now bear his name.

== Work ==
Bagdasar's most important works are: Filosofia contemporană a istoriei (vol. I, 1930), Din problemele culturii europene (1931), Istoria filosofiei românești (published as a standalone volume in 1940 and as part of Filosofia românească de la origini până astăzi, itself volume V of Istoria filosofiei moderne, 1941), Teoria cunoștinței (vol. I, 1941; vol. II, 1942) and Teoreticieni ai civilizației (1969). He was one of three co-authors of the 1943 Antologie filosofică. Filosofi străini. Together with Petrovici, he wrote Manualul de psihologie, a high school textbook that appeared annually between 1934 and 1945. He wrote nine studies in Societatea de mâine review, and others in Revista de filosofie, Minerva, Convorbiri Literare, Arhiva pentru reforma și știința socială and Ethos. Between 1930 and 1940, he edited special editions of Revista de filosofie dedicated to Baruch Spinoza, Georg Wilhelm Friedrich Hegel, Rădulescu-Motru, Negulescu, Ștefan Zeletin, René Descartes, Petrovici and Titu Maiorescu.In 1969, he published a translation of the Critique of Pure Reason; Critique of Practical Reason and The Metaphysics of Morals appeared posthumously in 1973. His first work in Romania was a study of Edmund Husserl that appeared in Revista de filosofie in 1928; there followed articles on Paul Natorp, Wilhelm Windelband, and Rickert, all previously unknown in Romania.

In terms of philosophical outlook, Bagdasar combined Kantianism, neo-Kantianism, and Husserl's phenomenology. Well-informed, constantly studying developments in the field, he sought to shed light on rationalist tendencies in philosophy, while taking account of his era's rapid scientific progress to question the limits of Auguste Comte's positivism. In Teoria cunoștinței, he critically analyzed epistemological theories such as relativism, agnosticism and positivism, while systematically presenting philosophical doctrines of knowing. Filosofia contemporană a istoriei, of which one out of a planned three volumes were completed, deals with foreign philosophers' approach to history, but also discusses the thinking of Alexandru Dimitrie Xenopol and Nicolae Iorga about this topic. His Istoria filosofiei românești was the first work to analyze the evolution of philosophical concepts in Romania.

Rădulescu-Motru selected Bagdasar as editing secretary of Revista de filosofie, which he proceeded to turn into the country's most important philosophy periodical, beginning with its appearance in a new format in March 1928. After relaunching the magazine, he obtained Rădulescu-Motru's assent to invigorate the Romanian Philosophical Society, which at that point was holding small, sporadic meetings. Under his guidance as secretary, the society held public conferences in the amphitheater of the Carol I University Foundation. Open to those paying admission, these events took place every autumn between 1928 and 1938. The conferences were highly successful, with members of the public filling the auditorium; moreover, by early 1929, the society was on a firm financial footing thanks to ticket sales, memberships, subsidies and subscriptions and sales of Revista de filosofie, which managed to cover its printing costs. He established the country's first publishing house dedicated to philosophy; its first book was Spinoza's Ethics. This was followed by works on Rădulescu-Motru and Negulescu; George Berkeley's Treatise Concerning the Principles of Human Knowledge and David Hume's Enquiry Concerning Human Understanding, both introduced by Bagdasar; Lucretius' De rerum natura and Marsilio Ficino's Commentary on Plato's Symposium on Love. He founded Tiparul Universitar printing press in 1935; all the society's books were printed there during the next decade. The most important of these was Istoria filosofiei moderne, which appeared in five volumes between 1937 and 1941 and brought together contributions from all the country's academic centers, under the leadership of Rădulescu-Motru and Bagdasar's coordination. In 1930, he edited a celebratory volume marking 35 years of university teaching by Rădulescu-Motru; the book brought together contributions from leading academics, including Gheorghe Vlădescu-Răcoasa, Eugeniu Speranția, Mihai Ralea, Tudor Vianu, Mircea Djuvara, Petrovici, and Gusti, as well as Bagdasar.

His tenure at Casa Școalelor began in December 1941, when Petrovici, the new minister, urged him to accept a government post. His first action was to try and enlarge the budget, an idea Petrovici met with skepticism, given that the country had recently entered World War II. Mircea Vulcănescu of the Finance Ministry rejected the proposal, stating that all the ministry's objectives were geared toward the war effort. Bagdasar went directly to the minister, pleading that at the postwar peace conference, the Romanian government would be able to argue that cultural figures continued to work even during the war. Although minister Nicolae Stoenescu was a professional soldier, he agreed, setting a budget of 70 million lei. This allowed Casa Școalelor to become the country's largest publishing house, putting out more titles over the next three years than during its entire previous existence. Bagdasar resigned as director in October 1944, following the coup against Romania's pro-Axis dictator. Under communism in the 1950s, he was taken to task for having accepted this position, but justified his decision on several grounds. He noted that he detested the Ion Antonescu regime, as well as Adolf Hitler, but wished to do a favor for Petrovici, who knew of his anti-fascist leanings but imposed no conditions. He said he wished to avoid frequent drills and letter-censorship duty. Probably under duress, he apologized for allowing Iron Guard figure Traian Brăileanu to publish classic philosophers in translation, while noting that several Jewish writers (Ion Aurel Candrea, Nina Façon, and S. Katz) had been published with his support. Finally, he noted that he had never published an article in Revista de filosofie by Guardist ideologue Nae Ionescu or his followers, but this was untrue, as Vulcănescu and Constantin Noica, both disciples of Ionescu's, made their appearance.
