= Roșiești =

- Commune
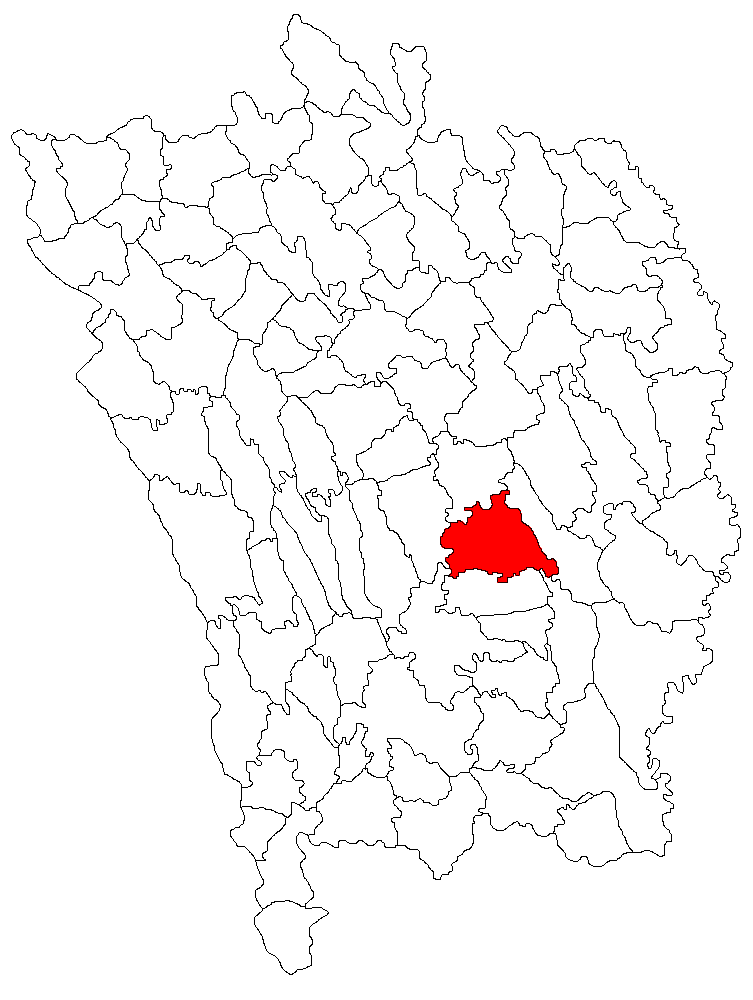
- Location in Vaslui County

- Location in Romania
- Coordinates: 46°26′N 27°53′E
- Country: Romania
- County: Vaslui

Government
  - Mayor (2020–2024): Florin Anea (PSD)
- Population (2021-12-01): 2,726
- Time zone: EET/EEST (UTC+2/+3)
- Vehicle reg.: VS

Roșiești is a commune in Vaslui County, Western Moldavia, Romania. It is composed of seven villages: Codreni, Gara Roșiești, Gura Idrici, Idrici, Rediu, Roșiești and Valea lui Darie.

== Natives ==
- Dumitru Bagdasar
- Nicolae Bagdasar
