= Union of Patriots =

Union of Patriots may refer to:

- Union of Polish Patriots, left-group of Polish exiles
- Union of Patriots, Georgian political party established after the Mkhedrioni was banned
- Union of Patriots, Romanian anti-fascist organization that became the National Popular Party
