= National Popular Party (Romania) =

National Popular Party (Union of Patriots) Partidul Național Popular (Uniunea Patrioților)
- President: Gheorghe Vlădescu-Răcoasa (ca. 1943; 1946–1949); Dumitru Bagdasar (1943–1946); Mitiță Constantinescu (1946); Petre Constantinescu-Iași (1949)
- Founded: 1942
- Dissolved: 1949
- Headquarters: Crângului Street 15, Bucharest (to 1944); Spătarului Street, Bucharest (after 1944)
- Newspaper: România Liberă (1943–1944); Tribuna Poporului (1944–1946); Națiunea (1946–1949)
- Military wing: Patriotic Combat Formations (FLP)
- Religious wing: Union of Democratic Priests (UPD)
- Ideology: Big tent Antifascism; Left-wing populism Left-wing nationalism (Romanian)
- Political position: Centre-left to far-left
- National affiliation: Patriotic Antihitlerite Front (1943); National-Democratic Coalition (1944); National Democratic Front (1944); Bloc of Democratic Parties (1946); People's Democratic Front (1948)

The National Popular Party (Romanian: Partidul Național Popular, PNP) was an anti-fascist political party in Romania, founded during World War II as the underground Union of Patriots (Uniunea Patrioților, UP). The latter had defined itself as a spontaneous movement of resistance to the dictatorial regime of Ion Antonescu, but was largely known as a front for the illegal Romanian Communist Party (PCdR, later PCR). Its founders—Dumitru Bagdasar, Gheorghe Vlădescu-Răcoasa, Simion Stoilow—were closely cooperating with PCdR men, but also with liberal opposition forces. Repressed by the authorities, the UP made a comeback after the pro-Allied August 23 Coup of 1944, when it endured as a small ally of the communists—mostly controlled directly by them, but sometimes rebellious.

Defining itself as a party for the middle classes, the PNP sought to attract into its ranks both nationalists and ethnic minorities, and was used by the Communist Party as a means of weakening the traditional parties. From 1945, it registered its most significant successes among the repenting fascists, absorbing into its ranks former members of the Iron Guard. The UP and PNP were instrumental in helping the PCR reach some of its main objectives, including the overthrow of Nicolae Rădescu and the hastening of land reform.

The PNP was nominally loyal to King Michael I, but had no longer a part to play in decision-making when Michael was overthrown on the closing days of 1947. The party itself survived the 1948 election, but was dissolved by its leaders in early 1949, reportedly under pressure from the new government. Its former activists were either integrated into the structures of the communist state or repressed and, in some cases, imprisoned by the latter.

== History ==
=== Wartime opposition ===
The UP's roots were planted in a semi-clandestine intellectual movement that opposed Antonescu's regime in general and, in particular, its support for Nazi Germany and the other Axis powers, and its commitment to war against the Soviet Union. According to its own records, the UP emerged clandestinely in early 1942, centered on the activities of three left-leaning intellectuals: the brain surgeon Bagdasar, the sociologist Vlădescu-Răcoasa, and the mathematician Stoilow. As listed by historian Corneliu Crăciun, the group's explicit goals were: "sabotaging the war industry, resisting the dispatch of men on the anti-Soviet front, organizing partisans into detachments, annulling the Vienna Diktat, peace with the USA, England and the USSR." Vlădescu-Răcoasa had a background in politics, initially as an affiliate of the Democratic Nationalists, then as an internationalist and antifascist with strong Marxist leanings. He had also been registered as a member of the Social Democratic Party (PSDR). Bagdasar was educated abroad, where he became inspired by American progressivism, while Stoilow had frequented meetings of pro-Allied intellectuals, some of whom supported the mainstream National Peasants' Party (PNȚ).

One of the first notable actions of the UP was publishing, starting with January 1943, the illegal newspaper România Liberă, later joined by another antifascist organ, Lupta Patriotică. The former was reportedly designed to appear in September–November 1942, but was discovered by the Siguranța police and could reemerge only in January of the next year. According to various accounts, România Liberă was managed from Bucharest by George Ivașcu, on his spare time from editing the pro-Antonescu gazette Vremea and with only marginal interventions from the PCdR. Party historians claimed that the newspaper "kept the popular masses informed" on the growth of resistance, whereas Crăciun notes that its circulation was exceedingly small. However, historian Radu Păiușan claims that the UP's history can be traced back to a propaganda operation carried out later by Romanian communists exiled on Soviet territory: in January 1943, Leonte Răutu supposedly created the newspaper România Liberă, and a radio station of the same name, with which the Soviets intended to give the impression of a rising antifascist movement in Romania.

=== PCdR contacts ===
Several authors trace the original meeting between the UP and the PCdR to mid-1943. They refer to either the turn of tides on the front, after Stalingrad, or to involvement, in 1943, of PCdR men Constantin Agiu and Petre Constantinescu-Iași, who took it upon themselves to reorganize the Union from November 1943. The two were subsequently joined by other communists or communist sympathizers, including Mihai Levente, Mihai Magheru, and Stanciu Stoian. Vlădescu-Răcoasa was the first person identified as leader of the UP, while Agiu was designated Caretaker; Constantinescu-Iași and Bagdasar were tasked with co-opting intellectuals, while Levente served as the administrator and Magheru directed work in the provinces. Nicu Rădescu, the estranged and ill-reputed son of General Nicolae Rădescu, was also closely cooperating with both the PCdR and the UP.

Under this guidance, the UP contacted a group of high-ranking soldiers who were seeking to depose Antonescu, the most active of whom was Gheorghe Avramescu—who was at once an antifascist and anticommunist. The UP also left a historical record as a member of the PCdR's Patriotic Antihitlerite Front, which also included the revived Ploughmen's Front and two other small political groups: the Socialist Peasants' Party, the Hungarian People's Union (MADOSZ). The association pact was sealed in August 1943, after a secretive meeting in which the UP was represented by Bagdasar and an N. Dinulescu. Outside of the Front, the UP still maintained links with other opposition groups, and was especially close to left-wing Social Democrats (Ion Pas, Ștefan Voitec, Theodor Iordăchescu, Leon Ghelerter). Throughout 1943, Magheru, as UP representative, held talks with the PNȚ, aiming to "create a broad coalition of the democratic and patriotic forces toward bring down the Antonescu regime".

Subsequently, the UP's Central Committee took residence in the same building as the PCdR archive, at the Wexler residence on Crângului Street 15, Bucharest. It soon reported having some thousands of members of all ethnic backgrounds, and representation in all the main cities, with most active cells in university towns and among schoolteachers' unions. It also touted its presence among the workers, especially those at the Romanian Railway Company, whom it encouraged on sabotage missions. According to official records, the first registered members also included Iorgu Iordan and Ștefan Vencov, with outside sympathizers such as Zevedei Barbu, Constantin Balmuș, Eduard and Florica Mezincescu, Mircea Florian, David Prodan, Teodor Bugnariu, Alexandru Graur, Constantin Daicoviciu, Constantin I. Parhon, Bazil Munteanu, and Mihai Ralea. Another version suggests that Zevedei Barbu, who was also a PCdR man, was helped by Alexandru Roșca with establishing a UP nucleus at Cluj University (which had relocated to Sibiu). All these records obscure the participation of the PNȚ which, through Ioan Hudiță, also claimed to have established this intellectual opposition movement.

=== 1943–1944: repression and resurgence ===
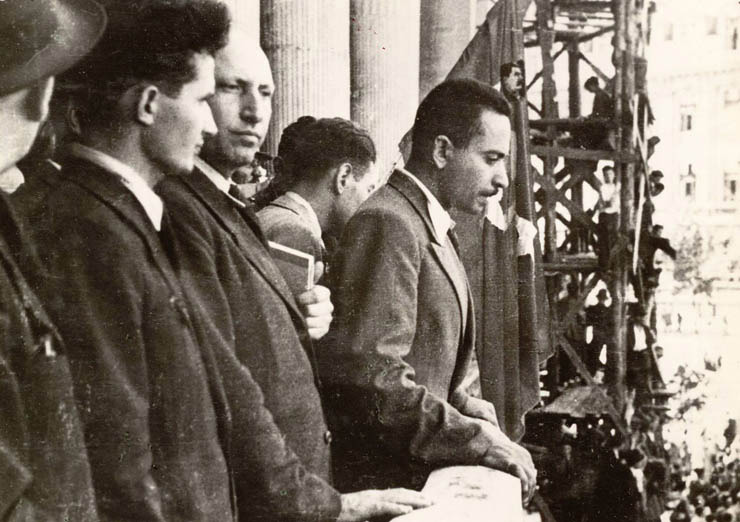
Gheorghe Vlădescu-Răcoasa (center) with the PCdR's Nicolae Ceaușescu and Andrei Pătrașcu, at a meeting of solidarity with the Red Army. Bucharest, August 30, 1944

In May 1943, Siguranța had captured an UP man, the statistician Mircea Biji, who was interrogated and agreed to cooperate, leading the authorities into UP safe houses. Later that year, the authorities issued an arrest warrant for psychologist Mihai Beniuc, identifying him as another UP liaison—in fact, Beniuc had yet to join the group, and was largely unaware of its activities. On December 15, the secret police organized its sting operation. At Crângului, it chanced upon a trove of PCdR documents, filed by Remus Koffler, with incriminating evidence about the UP. Several were arrested, including Vlădescu-Răcoasa and Magheru. The landowner Petru Groza, founder of the Ploughmen's Front, was also picked up, the documents having revealed that he was sponsoring the UP.

In all, fifty men and women suspected of UP membership or sympathies were subjected to a mass trial in first two months of 1944. While Groza's release was ordered by Antonescu himself, Vlădescu-Răcoasa found himself sentenced to 15 years of hard labor. The court found him guilty of "endangering State order and security". Similar sentences were handed to Zevedei Barbu, to Magheru, and to Magheru's wife Anca. Bagdasar, by then also a member of the PCdR, took charge of the UP, with Agiu taking a Central Committee seat. Before April 1944, the movement was involved in negotiations with the PNȚ and the PCdR-backed left-leaning circles of Iași. Together, they wrote an open letter of protest to Antonescu, asking for Romania's immediate withdrawal from the Eastern Front. On May 24, 1944, the Union also entered a "National-Democratic Coalition", alongside the National Liberal Party–Tătărescu, Groza's Front, the PSDR, the PSȚ, MADOSZ, and Petre Topa's Democratic Nationalists.

In March 1944, the PCdR had joined a pan-resistance National Democratic Bloc (BND), which also included the PNȚ, PSDR, and the National Liberal Party (PNL). Together with King Michael I and his court, the group carried out the August 23 Coup, resulting in Antonescu's arrest and the unilateral cession of war with the Allies. Just one day after the coup, Vlădescu-Răcoasa was freed and resumed political activities in the open, introduced by the party press as "the combatant for Romanian freedom." On August 31, UP members were on hand at the rally held to greet the Red Army upon its entrance into Bucharest, the effective start of Soviet occupation.

By October 1944, when it had established chapters in all of sectors of Bucharest, the UP had moved its headquarters on Spătarului Street. This was a former hospice of the Wehrmacht, evacuated during the street fighting, and reportedly vandalized "beyond belief" by the UP's own members. While assuming a public face, the Union had to abandon its political newspaper: România Liberă was seized by the PCdR, and its first issue of this new series, presumed lost, was falsified by the PCR after 1972. In its stead, on September 15, the UP inaugurated Tribuna Poporului, which was entrusted to George Călinescu, the literary historian and novelist. The UP also sponsored Călinescu's foreign-policy review, Lumea.

Following negotiations at the beginning of September, the Union absorbed the rump Socialist Party led by Vasile Anagnoste. On September 27, the UP and its former Patriotic Antihitlerite colleagues formed a political alliance called National Democratic Front (FND), which also comprised the PSDR. As UP envoys, Vlădescu-Răcoasa, Bagdasar and Stoilow held a seat each on the FND National Council. The new pact, comprising forces that were vastly unequal to each other, was sealed only after the communists had resumed their pressures on the PNL and PNȚ, both of which refused to join a long-term alliance. According to anticommunist diplomat Emil Ciurea, it pitted one of the PCdR's alliances (Antihitlerites, "enriched by the arrival of [the PSDR] socialists") against the other (BND).

Throughout October, the UP was a participant in the PCdR-organized public rallies against the independent Premier, General Constantin Sănătescu, and his PNȚ and PNL ministers, accusing the cabinet of playing protector to war criminals. Vlădescu-Răcoasa was active in the intrigue, and, at a public rally held in Călărași, discussed the imperative of creating "the new Romania at all costs". On November 4, following a Soviet intervention, Sănătescu reshuffled his cabinet, with a third of the ministerial mandates, and sizable portions of provincial administrative offices, going to FND politicians. In newly liberated Northern Transylvania, this meant the UP's integration at the highest level of local government. The FND, cooperating with MADOSZ, contemplated making the region into an autonomous entity, and organized an executive Northern Transylvanian Committee that included two UP activists. This body was in conflict with the PNȚ and PNL, its rallies allegedly broken up by the Maniu Guards. Finally joining the UP, Beniuc was sent into the region, organizing new chapters for both the Union and the Ploughmen's Front.

=== FND alliance and 1945 turmoil ===
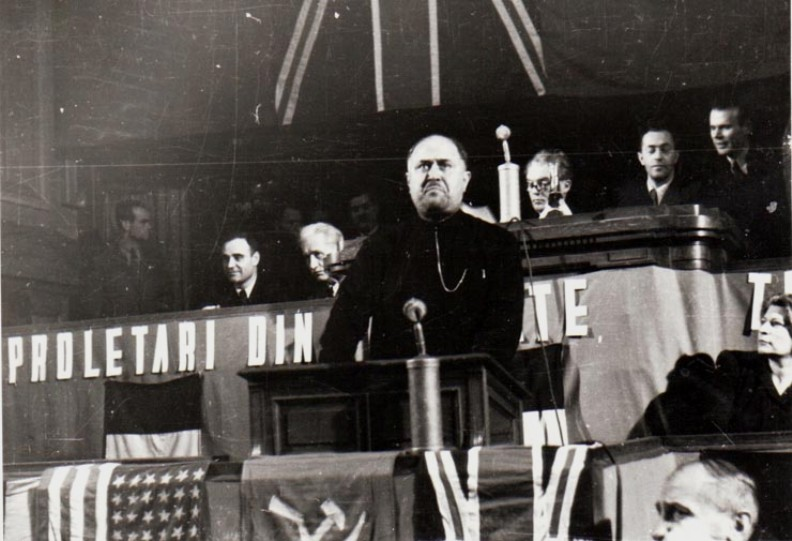
Constantin Burducea addressing the Congress of Unified Labor Unions, Bucharest, on January 30, 1945. The photograph also shows the PCR's Gheorghe Gheorghiu-Dej, Ana Pauker, Alexandru Sencovici, and Chivu Stoica, with Social Democrats Gheorghe Nicolau and Victor Brătfăleanu

Vlădescu-Răcoasa was briefly appointed Minister for Minority Affairs (renamed by him "for Nationalities"), serving until February 1945, after which he was demoted to Undersecretary. During December 1944, the FND was co-opted into the new cabinet formed by General Rădescu, but continued to air its tensions with the two liberal parties with which it shared power. The UP followed suit. Involved with Groza in Northern Transylvanian affairs, statistician Sabin Manuilă, a former PNȚ supporter and participant in the August 1944 Coup, was also welcomed into the UP, then appointed Undersecretary of State for Stately Organization. The party's reservoir of cadres expanded to include many intellectuals associated with Constantinescu-Iași, for instance Balmuș and Zevedei Barbu. The latter served as UP recruiter in Sibiu County. With Constantinescu-Iași, Balmuș served as a UP representative to assemblies commemorating Antonescu's antisemitic crimes. Also joining the UP was physicist Ilie G. Murgulescu, who edited the daily a UP regional mouthpiece in Banat.

During that period, the UP involved itself in the campaign against Rădescu, headlined by the Communist Party (which was now known as PCR, rather than PCdR). They agitated for land reform and organized the campaign against price gouging. In Jiu Valley and Hunedoara County at large, the UP carried out "democratic work" in favor of miners' welfare, distributing food and setting up price control committees. Throughout the country, its activists joined hands with the Ploughmen's Front, redistributing to the peasants most of the plots that were over 50 hectares. At the time, the UP also organized its religious wing for "highly conscious" Orthodox priests, called Union of Democratic Priests (Uniunea Preoților Democrați, UPD) and led by the UP's Minister of Religious Affairs, Constantin Burducea.

As a witness to the political crisis, King Michael probably contemplated replacing Rădescu with the old UP associate, General Avramescu. The latter had earned distinction in the Siege of Budapest, and was respected by the Red Army, but evidently resented Soviet interference. Vlădescu-Răcoasa noted Avramescu's acceptance of the FND program, but the PCdR refused to take him into consideration. By then, Nicu Rădescu and Levente were directly involved in the effort to create and illegally arm a communist-controlled paramilitary force, the Patriotic Combat Formations (Formațiunile de Luptă Patriotică, FLP). Literary critic Niculae Gheran, who was involved with the UP paramilitary as a teenager, recalls that the atmosphere was still largely apolitical, and that the formations were set out to eradicate criminality. The "game of cops and robbers" ended when Eugen Alimănescu of the Bucharest Police took control of the situation, with crude but effective methods.

Meanwhile, the demonstrations turned violent on February 24, 1945, when communists staged an assault on the Internal Affairs Ministry. The seminal event of this confrontation was a public rally, with Bagdasar and the UPD's Dumitru Popescu-Moșoia as guest speakers. During the push-back, several protesters were killed by gunshot; later investigation uncovered that the bullets were not of the standard caliber used in the Ministry. Nicu Rădescu, who was hiding out at the UP's headquarters, participated in the propaganda effort, publicly accusing his father of murder. On March 6, 1945, Groza eventually managed to topple Premier Rădescu, who escaped to British Cyprus, and set up a communist-dominated cabinet, with Constantinescu-Iași as the new Information Minister. Also joining the cabinet as the UP's appointee was Grigore Vasiliu Rășcanu, the Minister of War. Bagdasar became the Minister of Health, and, as a technocrat tasked with managing the nationwide health crisis, earned the respect of his political adversaries. General Avramescu, meanwhile, was killed in an air raid on the Slovak front, reportedly shortly after being arrested by the Soviets. The UP resumed its orthodox political stance. Rădescu's son, by then a card-carrying communist, was tasked with purging the Union of political undesirables, then assigned over to the Siguranța, which he helped transform into the Securitate.

On November 8, 1945, Groza's military and paramilitary forces repressed a popular demonstration marking the anniversary of Michael I, who was still the reigning monarch. As noted by historian Ioan Lăcustă, these events ended in "a bloodbath", ordered by Groza's Interior Minister, Teohari Georgescu. According to PNȚ investigators such as Corneliu Coposu, the UP was directly involved, asking its activists to stage a counter-manifestation in Palace Square, and to prevent the monarchists from reaching the Square. The UP's press made ample reference to the events, reinterpreting them according to communist guidelines, whereas the independent newspapers were barred from even reporting on them.

=== PNP creation ===
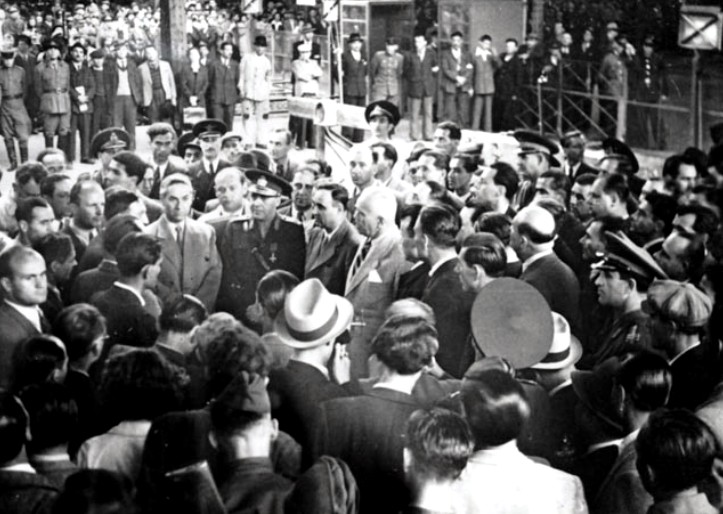
Gheorghiu-Dej with Petru Groza, Grigore Vasiliu Rășcanu, and Petre Constantinescu-Iași, meeting workers at Bucharest North railway station. May 2, 1946

On January 12–13, 1946, the UP held a national congress at Trianon Cinema, Bucharest, after which it reemerged as the National Popular Party. Also at that meeting, it elected itself a new president, the economist Mitiță Constantinescu. He was seconded by Vlădescu-Răcoasa, Bagdasar, and Oțetea. On March 19 or 20, the National Populars inaugurated their own official news outlet, Națiunea. Editorship was assigned to Călinescu, who was in the process of adapting his work to Marxist doctrines, and was by then a member of the PNP Executive Committee. It heralded radical attacks against the political opposition, from the disgraced far-right to the PNȚ. For a while, the newspaper still preserved a nominal independence in the selection of its literary staff, publishing the essays of Adrian Marino and Alexandru Piru, which were still untouched by the communist style.

With assistance from its communist backers, the PNP soon began a large recruitment campaign. Among those who signed up were several famous literary and scientific figures, including poet Alexandru A. Philippide, historian Andrei Oțetea, and biologist Traian Săvulescu; literary critic Mihai Gafița, a former PNL man, was its students' wing representative. In Murgulescu's Banat sections, new recruits included General Teodor Șerb (President of the PNP Chapter in Timiș-Torontal County), physicist Valeriu Novacu (who went on to serve as County Prefect), poet Alexandru Jebeleanu, and industrialists Jacques Hellmann and Anton Hollander.

Like the Alexandrescu Peasantists, the PNP was specifically dedicated to undermining the PNȚ, that is to say the PCdR's most powerful opponent. Constantinescu-Iași recalled that, even in 1943, the UP was working to "set up opposition groups within the PNȚ", but "in such a manner that no group would be torn away from the party". As noted by political scientist Ioan Stanomir, the party was later a tool used by the PCdR "to gnaw at the PNȚ before they ultimately dissolved it". This campaign was sparked in 1944 by a broadcast on Radio Moscow. By 1946, the PNP had only managed to absorb remnants of the interwar Radical Peasants' Party, who had refused to rejoin the PNȚ.

The recruitment drive was punctuated by episodes of dissent. Jebeleanu was almost removed from the party after he was found to be an insubordinate propagandist. More embarrassingly, the PNP failed to enlist Lucian Blaga, the celebrated poet-philosopher. Blaga admitted feeling terrorized by direct threats to his artistic independence, and, at the risk of marginalization, opted not to join (or, according to another version, joined, was immediately made a member of the PNP Central Committee, and just as immediately resigned). Burducea, perceived by Groza as a political liability, was also sacked from his ministerial position, and the UPD chairmanship was assigned to an Ion Vască.

On March 22–24, 1946, the PNP held its annual reunion in Bucharest, culminating in a popular assembly presided upon by Oțetea. On May 16, the PNP was co-opted by a communist-led electoral alliance, the Bloc of Democratic Parties (BPD). In early November, its representative in the Assembly of Deputies and PNP General Secretary, a Mihail Dragomirescu, played a central part in the sessions which condemned and pushed aside a minor PCR ally, the National Liberal Party–Tătărescu. However, there were notable setbacks for the PNP, including the sudden disappearance of Călinescu's Lumea. Also in May, Bagdasar resigned as Health Minister and took a diplomatic posting, but died of cancer before he could take office. In September of that year, his widow Florica Bagdasar made history by becoming the first ever Romanian woman minister, after being assigned the Health portfolio. Mitiță Constantinescu also died at that time, prompting the PNP executive to elect Vlădescu-Răcoasa in his place.

=== 1946 election and 1947 takeover ===
In the general election of November 1946, which was rigged through fraud and voter intimidation, the Bloc claimed a decisive victory. However, the PNP only had a minor role to play in the campaign, with a reported 7% of the BPD candidates. The BPD and MADOSZ had counted 79.86% of the vote in its favor, obtaining 378 of the 414 total Assembly of Deputies seats, of which the PNP held 26. Constantinescu-Iași ran and won as head of the electoral list in Tutova County, returning to serve as Information Minister; Florica Bagdasar was elected in Tulcea County, and continued to serve as the Health Minister until August 1948. She sat in the Assembly next to Călinescu, who had been elected in Botoșani County. Other PNP deputies included Vlădescu-Răcoasa, Oțetea, historian Dumitru Almaș, and General Secretary Dragomirescu, who represented Timiș-Torontal.

The PNP withdrew from the Groza cabinet on November 29, 1946, in protest at what it felt was its under-representation. It found itself in an unusual situation as the loyal opposition to the BPD, stating its refusal to attack any of the Bloc's politicians. Both Bagdasar and Săvulescu continued to serve in the cabinet, the latter as Agriculture Minister. The PNP's withdrawal from power, and its general subservience to the BPD, were noted factors of stress at a local level. However, it was able to attract more followers with the dissolution of Constantin Argetoianu's National Union of Labor and Rebirth (UNMR). Two of the latter's pro-communist wings were absorbed at the time: the UNMR tradesmen wing, under Petre Misale, and the formerly independent National Agrarian Action, directed by Paul Iliescu and Max Schapira.

In July 1947, after the Tămădău Affair and news of an anti-communist partisan movement, PNP representatives supported the communist motion to outlaw the PNȚ. Moreover, Națiunea and Călinescu himself joined in the denunciation campaign, publishing propaganda pieces that maligned the imprisoned PNȚ-ists. Other party members used their last opportunity to escape the country: Manuilă settled in the United States, Zevedei Barbu defected in Scotland. During the following months, the PNP was in favor of a bill that politicized and de-professionalized the justice system, introducing juries selected from among the "workers and toiling peasants" by their respective trade unions and corporate bodies.

In November, Vlădescu-Răcoasa became Ambassador to Moscow, which was perceived as a "posting of overwhelming importance" in that context. Still the PNP president, he was abroad when the communists imposed abdication on King Michael and proclaimed the People's Republic. On February 1, 1948, the PNP resumed its activities in the new republic: the Bucharest branch of the PNP elected Balmuș as its chairman. While still serving abroad, Vlădescu-Răcoasa was appointed by the Assembly of Deputies, reformed into the rubber-stamp Great National Assembly, to a committee drafting a socialist constitution.

=== Dissolution and aftermath ===
The PNP remained closely aligned with the Romanian Workers' Party (PMR), as the PCR styled itself after absorbing the Social Democrats. From February 1948, it was part of the People's Democratic Front (FPD), an electoral alliance formed with the PMR, the Ploughmen's Front, and MADOSZ. Constantinescu-Iași, Dragomirescu, and Alexandru Șteflea were its delegates on the FPD National Council. The subsequent elections were advertised by PMR leader Gheorghe Gheorghiu-Dej as a consolidation of "democratic conquests against imperialism", destined to "nip in the bud all attempts by the reaction to rear its head". Two decorative opposition forces were allowed to survive outside the FPD: the (reorganized) Tătărescu Liberals and the Democratic Peasants' Party–Lupu. The Front won 405 of the 414 seats, of which the PNP had 43. Vlădescu-Răcoasa, Almaș, Balmuș, Călinescu, Constantinescu-Iași, Oțetea and Săvulescu were among those returned to parliament.

Elected as the last PNP president, Constantinescu-Iași was also designated a Vice President of the Great National Assembly. However, the PNP survived until voting itself out of existence on February 6, 1949. The official notice informed its voters that, "under the watch of the Workers' Party", the PNP had "carried out the better part of its task", and that "to carry on as a separate organization would be an act of seclusion." As Călinescu explained, in Națiunea, the party and its newspaper's "historical mission" had been exhausted. Literary historian George Neagoe argues that this was a "public lie", as the PNP, a party of "fellow travelers", had not truly opted to dissolve itself; it was rather "discarded by its ally".

Until March 21, 1949, all regional chapters had been dissolved, and PNP deputies resumed their seats as independents. His influence greatly reduced, Constantinescu-Iași continued to serve in the Groza governments, and was Minister of Religious Affairs in 1953; Călinescu was likewise sidelined, maintaining some of his political functions but prevented from popularizing his unorthodox interpretations of Marxist dogma and world affairs. In 1959, he was almost arrested for "enemy-like behavior". Vlădescu-Răcoasa was also recalled from Moscow, and, assigned to minor positions, had to watch on as the regime suppressed, then confiscated, Romanian sociology. Florica Bagdasar was eliminated from political life by 1953, when she was also attacked in the press as a "cosmopolitan". Instead, Oțetea accumulated accolades and, as an official historian, signaled the 1964 break with the Soviets, revealing to the public the anti-Russian pronunciations of Marxist classics.

Several suppliant members of the Communist Party's Central Committee, down to the Romanian Revolution of 1989, and including Levente and Gheorghe Mihoc, had been activists in the original UP. România Liberă's Ivașcu rose through the ranks of the PMR until, owing to a case of mistaken identity, was prosecuted for war crimes, imprisoned, then rehabilitated and again assigned party work. Contrarily, Nicu Rădescu was tempted by a career in the repressive apparatus. He was sacked from the Securitate in 1956 for his disregard of decorum, and began a second career as a Centrocoop functionary, dying in anonymity in 1993.

== Doctrines ==
=== Functions ===
The UP and PNP functioned mainly as a testing ground for the PCdR, filtering its future members and making its ideology palatable to the general public. Many scholars see the UP/PNP as mainly a front for the exceedingly minor PCdR, variously describing it as "rather decorative", an "electioneering vent", an "organization designed to fulfill the communists' objectives", a "diversion", "instrument" or "windscreen", and a "quasi-party". Literary historian and former communist politician Pavel Țugui disagrees: with an "antifascist and antiracist program", standing for "various democratic orientations", the UP "did not form any alliances with any party whatsoever between 1942 and spring 1944." He notes that the collaboration with the communists should be seen as one between "two distinct political and organizational entities", with the UP on the center-left.

Initially, the UP itself acknowledged that it had a short-term role, presenting itself not as a party, but as a big tent movement of antifascists and PCdR members, irrespective of ethnicity, social class, or creed. Members called each other prieten ("friend"), mirroring the communist tovarăș ("comrade"). In a December 1944 address to the people, Novacu presented the August 23 Coup as top-down seizure of power, rather than as a popular revolution, noting that the action of a few would "impel and enrich the populace". At around the same time, Vlădescu-Răcoasa was claiming that, in the "new world", it would matter not whether "one is a bourgeois or a proletarian, but if one is a democrat". The one "true democracy", he indicated, was a people's democracy. He also stated that the UP was not about distributing "posts and ministries."

The UP also sought to profit from the introduction of women's suffrage, putting out a manifesto specifically aimed at women voters. Critical of "vain feminism", it proposed equal responsibilities for women in the effort to reconstruct Romania. A female activist, Cornelia Sterian, also explained that "woman must become equal in rights, she must play an active part in the political struggle for a free and fulfilling life." A Bucharest female section had been formed by 1946, animated by Margareta Vlădescu-Răcoasa and by Mihail Sadoveanu's wife Valeria.

In its later electoral manifestos, the UP called itself "a political organization in support of the people", consolidating "an independent, democratic and merry Romania", emerging naturally from "the movement of resistance against the Hitlerites and the Antonescu dictatorship". By then, the movement advertised a more specific corporate goal, namely "the democratization of the middle classes". These were taken to include all categories between the proletariat (represented by the PCdR) and the "rich bankers, great landlords, dealers and speculators" it claimed were represented by the PNȚ and PNL; more specifically, the PNP was supposed to stand for professional workers, artisans, traders, industrialists, functionaries, pensioners, and freelancers. Writing about the accomplished "historical mission" of 1949, George Călinescu explained that it consisted of "educating non-proletarian working strata to understand and receive the coming social order."

Reviewing such claims, Păiușan argues that the PNP's objectives interfered with those of other FND members: the Ploughmen's Front and the Alexandrescu Peasantists existed specifically to draw in "the urban middle class." As noted by Lucian Blaga, its putative member, the PNP manifestly failed at becoming "an independent autonomous party of the petty bourgeoisie", and was simply "a maneuverable mass". Physician Epifanie Cozărescu of Săveni recalled in 2008 that he and his colleagues joined the PNP because it seemed like a protective cover against the "oppression of intellectuals by the Communist Party". Overall, "[we] were no longer given much attention".

=== Populism and nationalism ===
As noted by historian Carol Terteci, the UP shared a BPD platform of "populist promises". Party notables took pride in asserting that the BPD's program was largely inspired by its own charter, and thus "closest to the soul of the masses." A 1945 manifesto in Bârlad called on UP members to "erect a country where there would be no more poor people on this rich a land." With its involvement in the PCdR's war on price gauging, the PNP was soon identified as an anti-capitalist force by the middle class and the industrialists, who were reticent about joining its ranks. The UP tried to dissuade their fears, assuring them that the measures were only temporary. The PNȚ had some success in identifying the PNP as a front of the PCdR: PNP territorial offices complained that Nationalist Peasantist propaganda on this topic was driving away potential recruits.

Păiușan describes the UP as an organization which "betrayed the country" by "turning Romanians against the anti-Bolshevik war and sealing a pact with the Soviet enemy." When addressing a Romanian public, the National Populars took on the promotion of left-wing nationalism. Party speakers argued that "the criminal fascist war" offered "an occasion for verifying one's patriotism", and held that fascists "exploited patriotic sentiment", "poisoning the soul of the people". Writing in Lupta Patriotică, Novacu theorized that: "Motherland and patriotism stand for combat and sacrifice for mankind's permanent ideals. For liberty and independence, for one's language, art, for one's credo, one's bread, for our factories and our fields." Despite the UP's involvement in Northern Transylvanian regionalism, its leadership in Banat alleged that the PNȚ was only superficially and opportunistically patriotic. Party documents also identified the PNP with a struggle against Hungarian "revisionism", or against "venomous chauvinism" in general. The Northern Transylvanian issue was solved in Romania's favor, according to PNP sources, only because of "the unconditioned help of our great Eastern friend, the USSR, and our old friend, France."

The UP and later the PNP were formally dedicated to purging the country of fascists, in particular former members of the Iron Guard. The UP was the first organization to propose arresting Maria Antonescu, Veturia Goga, and Alexandru Hodoș. In practice, it proved immediately attractive for a category of former wartime fascists, and especially for Guardist sympathizers within the Orthodox Church. Notorious examples include the Religious Affairs Minister, Constantin Burducea and Religious Affairs Undersecretary Ion Vască, whose fascist past was a tool for extortion. Burducea had it that the Church was compatible with socialism, and that the FND was not "godless": "How could one hold suspicions of anti-Christian or anti-religious sentiment the FND's sincerely democratic parties, when the Front works for the brotherhood of all men, for bringing the Gospel to life within this nation, and for toppling hatred, injustice, obscurantism and social inequality?"

As Burducea's patron, Constantinescu-Iași extended his protection to one other PNP sympathizer and former Guardist, the bishop Antim Nica, who in turn sought to protect his colleagues by directing them into the party. Constantinescu-Iași also negotiated with Guard representatives such as Petre Țuțea to have its members join the PCdR and the UP en masse. Other efforts involved a former high-ranking figure in the Guard, historian P. P. Panaitescu, who similarly urged his former subordinates to make their way into the UP. In Putna County, that is to say Vlădescu-Răcoasa's own fief, the PNP chapter was weakened by disputes over the fascist past of its leaders, including its local secretary, the Orthodox priest Streche. Other PNP members of the far-right clergy, exposed by the Workers' Party only after 1949, included a head of the clergy syndicate in Baia County. In 1945, a circular letter presented to Teohari Georgescu of Internal Affairs estimated that there were 110 Guardists co-opted by the UP.

=== Minority issues ===
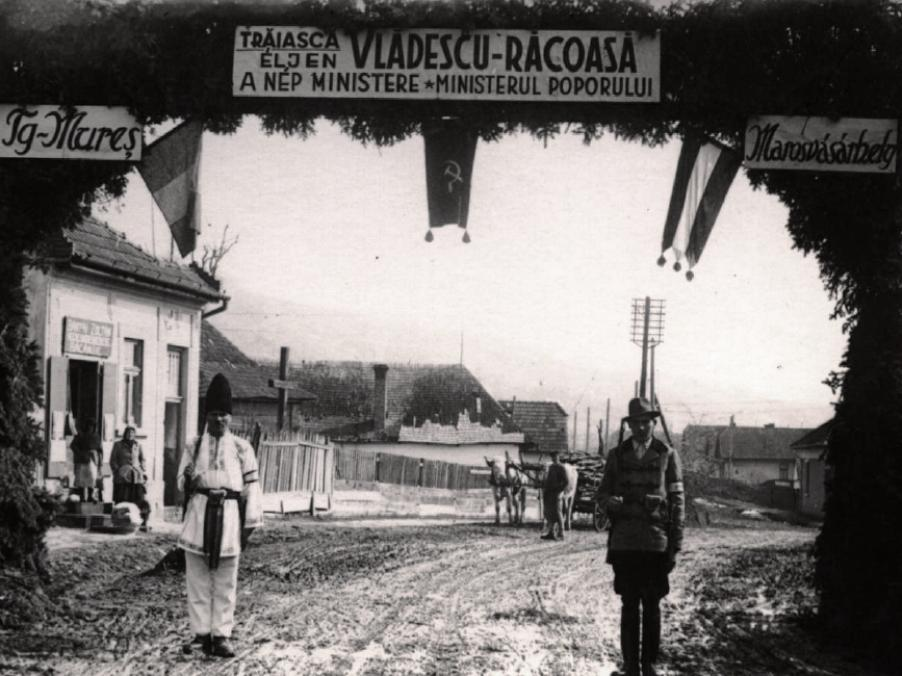
Triumphal arch with Hungarian and Romanian inscriptions and symbols, erected in Târgu Mureș in honor of Vlădescu-Răcoasa. August 4, 1945

While appealing to the Orthodox clergy, the PNP also enlisted members of the Eastern Catholic Church, including priest Gheorghe Zagrai. The UP had been especially active among the ethnic minorities, which were the focus of Vlădescu-Răcoasa's time in office. The PNP heralded denazification among the Banat Swabians, protecting some Swabians who, it claimed, were wrongly prosecuted by the People's Tribunals, while targeting others who supported the anti-communist opposition. Its relationship with the ethnic Hungarians was more tense, despite official rhetoric encouraging cooperation: the UP's Bihor County cell divided itself into competing cells, representing the region's ethnic groups, and was sabotaged by its MADOSZ allies. In February 1945, it voted to bar Hungarians from joining its ranks.

The communists also experimented by creating a parallel, UP-modeled, organization of Armenian Romanians. Called Union of Armenian Patriots (or Armenian Front), it drew Armenians away from the anti-Soviet Dashnaktsutyun. A similar body existed for exiled Spanish Republicans, who voted Vlădescu-Răcoasa as their honorary president.

The PNP had a more ambiguous stance concerning the Jewish and Romani communities, which had been the victims of deportation and murder during the Holocaust. During the Antonescu years, UP founder Manuilă had in fact come up with the project to deport Jews and Romanies into occupied Transnistria, singling them out as "stateless" communities. When this had been enforced, however, he had protected some 5,000 Jews, keeping them in Bucharest. Engineer Cornel Năstăsescu, who was at once a member of the PNP Committee and a leader of its branch in Năsăud County, made efforts to hide his wartime involvement with building projects that used Jewish labor.

In 1943, the UP participants in Patriotic Antihitlerite meetings argued that: "The Jewish group must have its own commission to allow the Jews to take care of purely Jewish issues." Speaking in February 1946, the communist politico Vasile Luca set his PNP partners the goal of attracting as many as possible from the 150,000 Jewish voters still living in Romania. There were Jewish members of the PNP, including one who, in 1947, also had a leadership position in the Jewish Democratic Committee of Fălciu County. Nevertheless, at official commemorations, PNP activists downplayed the historical impact of episodes such as the Iași pogrom of 1941, noting that, "other than the minor misunderstandings that are inherent to life in common, one can say that [Jews] have been fully embraced by their friends, the Romanian people." Călinescu's reference to the pogrom as "German-and-Iron Guard excesses" received negative coverage in the Zionist press, who saw evidence of whitewashing. Vlădescu-Răcoasa also clashed with the Zionists when, in November 1944, he announced that Jews would not be recognized as a distinct minority, but instead assimilated into their group of choice.

=== Factionalism and divergence ===
Even in its late years, PNP officials expressed a "belief in the eternal life of the Romanian Monarchy." This resolution passed into its statues, where "the recognition of the Monarchy" was one of the core ideas. Although it adopted a pro-Soviet policy that Păiușan sees as "treasonous", the UP included, at its original core, supporters of the Western Allies such as Bagdasar and Ivașcu. The Bagdasars worked closely with American officials in the Allied Commission, and were upset that Romania was prevented from joining the Marshall Plan.

Beyond its national representation and its trans-ethnic agenda, the PNP remained a minor and recessive force. As noted by Corneliu Crăciun, it was always less powerful than the Patriotic Defense, a workers' aid organization also gravitating around the PCdR, and also organized as a paramilitary wing. The UP's 1944 recruitment drive in Bihor, which was still nominally held by a rump Hungarian state, only managed some 200 enlistments, of which 150 were inactive members. Only 40 card-carrying members still existed in 1945, after Hungarians and Jews were expelled from the party. Likewise, in Cluj County, the UP was preferred by Romanian communist sympathizers, with the PCdR section dominated by Hungarians. In Putna, the UP only mustered some 1,700 members in all (compared to the 6,000 enlisted with the Alexandrescu Peasantists, but well ahead of the PCdR's 400). The Timiș-Torontal section, presided over by General Teodor Șerb, had some 2,000 to 2,500 members, the majority of whom were male peasants, with no representation for women and youth. Năstăsescu's branch in Năsăud went from 150 affiliates to a claimed 6,012 in the summer of 1946. The latter number is suspect, since 5,861 were peasants, and as such probably enlisted against their will.

As a corollary of its dependence on the PCdR, the party was heavily infiltrated by communist cells—the PCdR's own circulars commended the Putna cell as highly "dynamic". In Bihor, the UP was directly managed by a communist envoy, Imre Tóth. A similar situation reputedly occurred in Alba County, where the UP's temporary representative in 1945 was Dumitru Ciumbrudean, who had been stripped of his PCdR membership. These interventions divided the party. Some in the PNP struggled to maintain independence "with equal rights within the Bloc of Democratic Parties". In 1946, the Severin County chapter unanimously passed a resolution ruling the communists' transgressions as "inadmissible and impolite". The PNP also reported on abuses committed by paramilitary "citizens' guards", which, it implied, were terrorizing the populace, while activists such as Bagdasar expressed bafflement over the anti-Peasantist rhetorical violence. In early 1946, Călinescu and Națiunea demanded a "purge of the purgers", that is to say a toning down of repression against political undesirables.

Contrarily, other party branches were more readily enforcing persecution of the opposition. This was the case in Năsăud, where the Ploughmen's Front complained that overzealous PNP men were unwittingly alerting the PNȚ and PNL as to what lay in store for them. Father Burducea's unwavering support for the purge of anti-communists alienated the clergy, many of whom resented and mocked him; this matter contributed to his sacking. Seeing the BPD as an authoritarian instrument, members deserted in significant numbers during 1947, and some even became involved with a group of anti-communist partisans, formed by Gheorghe Arsenescu in Muscel County.

== Election results ==
=== Parliamentary elections ===
Election	Votes	%	Seats	+/–	Position
1946	Part of the BDP		26 / 414	–	6th
1948	Part of the FDP		43 / 414	▲17	▲3rd
