= Dumitru Bagdasar =

Romanian neurosurgeon (1893–1946)

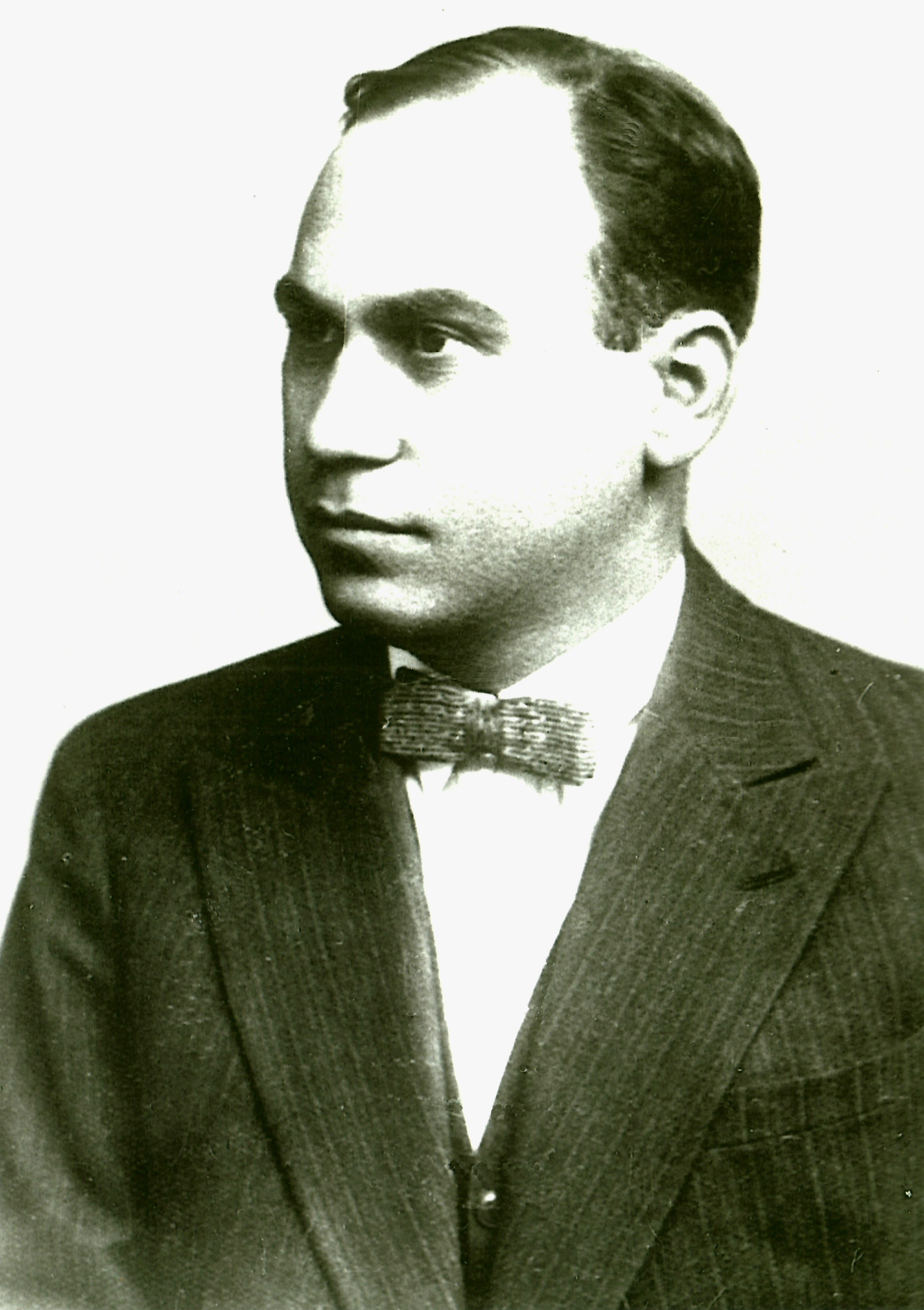
- Born: November 17, 1893; Roșiești Commune, Kingdom of Romania
- Died: July 16, 1946 (aged 52); Bucharest, Kingdom of Romania
- Citizenship: Romanian
- Occupations: Neurosurgeon, university professor, politician
- Known for: Founding of the Romanian School of Neurosurgery
- Relatives: Alexandra Bellow (daughter)
- Medical career
- Field: Neurology
- Institutions: Carol Davila University of Medicine and Pharmacy

Minister of Health
- In office 6 March 1945 – 24 April 1946
- Prime Minister: Petru Groza

President of the Union of Patriots
- In office 1943–1946
- Preceded by: Gheorghe Vlădescu-Răcoasa
- Succeeded by: Mitiță Constantinescu

Personal details
- Party: National Popular Party

Dumitru Bagdasar (17 December 1893 – 16 July 1946) was a Romanian-Armenian neurosurgeon, university professor and political activist. He was the founder of the Romanian school of neurosurgery and is known as the father of Romanian neurosurgery.

== Biography ==
=== Early life ===
Bagdasar was the fourth in a family of Armenian origin, with 12 children. Adamant to receive education, he walked over 2 kilometres to reach his school every day. After finishing primary education he entered Faculty of Medicine of Bucharest in 1913. In 1916 he joined the Military Medical institute in order to help himself financially. In the same year Romania entered the First World War and Bagdasar was mobilized to the front as a military doctor. He was demobilized in 1918 and continued his medical studies until 1922 when he obtained the title of Doctor of Medicine with the thesis "Contributions to the study of postencephalitic parkinsonian syndrome". After graduation, he became a secondary physician at the Military Hospital from 1922 to 1926. He became interested in neurology at the clinic of the Dr. Gheorghe Marinescu.

=== Provisional career ===
In 1927, he resigned from the army and married Dr. Florica Ciumetti. With modest resources, they moved to the USA to pursue their specialisations in Boston. While Florica studied Public Health at Harvard University under a Rockefeller Scholarship, Dumitru specialized in neurosurgery at the Peter Bent Brigham Hospital, where he studied and trained under Harvey Cushing and published several scientific research papers.

Upon their return to Romania in 1929, the couple encountered difficulties from state authorities and were thus assigned positions in the periphery of the country. Here, Dumitru Bagdasar performed his first neurosurgical interventions, in improvised, precarious conditions. Until he was able to create his own neurosurgery team, it was his wife, Florica Bagdasar, a child neuropsychiatrist, who was the only one assisting him in the operating room. Finally, in 1935, he managed to establish a small neurosurgery service, with ten beds and a single operating room, in the Central Hospital for Nervous and Mental Diseases in Bucharest. This became the nucleus of the future Neurosurgery Clinic of the Faculty of Medicine, where the Romanian school of neurosurgery would develop. Patients from Hungary, Bulgaria, Palestine were admitted to this clinic. Between 1931 and 1941, he performed 1800 operations on the nervous system. In 1939, he participated in the National Congress of Surgery in Bucharest.

=== Political activity ===
Throughout his life, Bagdasar was dedicated to several social issues. In his childhood and adolescence, he became acutely aware of the impoverished condition of Moldovan peasants, which included malnutrition, high infant mortality, illiteracy, lack of hygiene and medical care. This led to collaborate with left-wing groups. Indeed, he later collaborated with the Romanian Red Aid, helping anti-fascists in illegality and by testifying for them in various trials. During the Second World War, he was an active part of the leadership of the "Union of Patriots" in 1942, then of the "National Popular Party". In April 1944 he was one of the initiators of the intellectuals' manifesto addressed to Marshal Antonescu, which demanded Romania's exit from the war. He was also one of the initiators of ARLUS (Romanian Association for Strengthening Ties with the Soviet Union).

=== Later life ===
On March 6, 1945, he was appointed Minister of Health in the first government of Petru Groza. In this capacity, he created 60 new rural constituencies, sanatoriums, 100 maternity homes in the countryside, he led campaigns against typhus, typhoid fever, and recurrent fever.

Bagdasar died on July 16, 1946 due to a brain metastases. He was succeeded by his wife Florica (a child neuropsychiatrist) and his daughter Alexandra (a mathematician). In 1951 was posthumously elected a member of the Romanian Academy of Sciences.
