= Florica Bagdasar =

Romanian physician

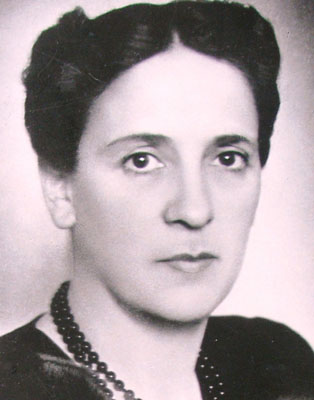
- Born: Florica Ciumetti; January 24, 1901; Monastir, Ottoman Empire
- Died: December 19, 1978 (aged 77); Bucharest, Socialist Republic of Romania
- Citizenship: Romanian
- Education: Medical Doctor
- Occupations: Physician, politician
- Known for: First woman minister in Romania (Minister of Health); Vice President of the Romanian Red Cross, 1957–1961
- Spouse: Dumitru Bagdasar
- Relatives: Alexandra Bellow (daughter)
- Medical career
- Profession: Physician
- Field: Mental Health
- Institutions: Carol Davila University of Medicine and Pharmacy
- Research: Child psychiatry and mental health
- Notable works: Center of Mental Hygiene; Extirpation of malaria epidemics in Romania
- Awards: Order of the Star of the Romanian People's Republic

Minister of Health
- In office 1 December 1946 – 21 January 1951
- Prime Minister: Petru Groza
- Preceded by: Dumitru Bagdasar; Petre Constantinescu-Iași (acting)
- Succeeded by: Vasile Mârza

Florica Bagdasar (née Ciumetti) (January 24, 1901 – December 19, 1978) was a Romanian neuropsychiatrist, who was the first woman minister in Romania at the Ministry of Health between 1946 and 1948.

== Biographical data and education ==
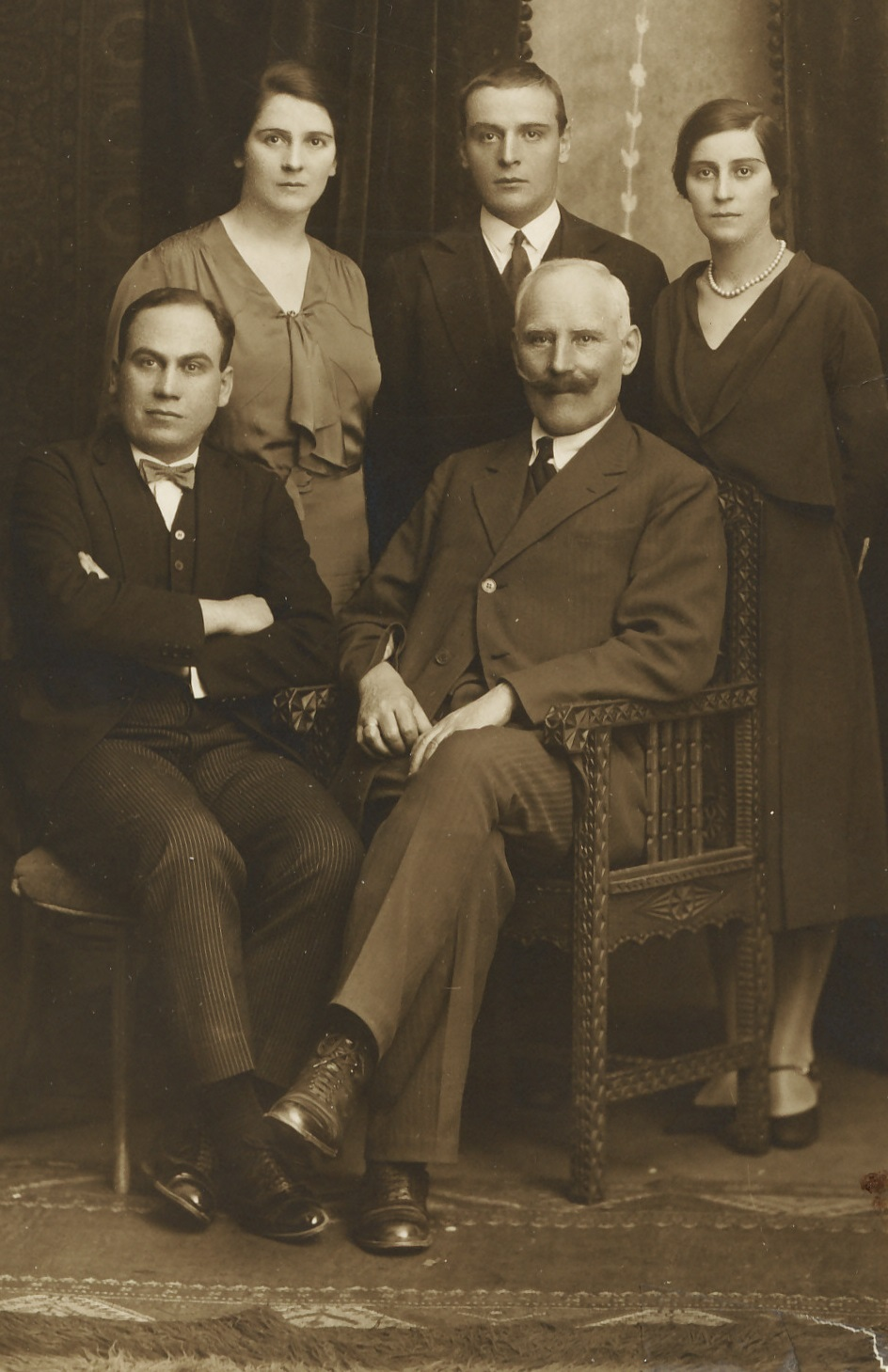
Sterie Ciumetti with Florica and Dumitru Bagdasar in 1934

Florica Ciumetti came from an Aromanian family. Her father was Sterie Ciumetti, a bridge and road engineer, as well as a high school mathematics teacher. Her mother was Anastasia Ciumetti (née Papahagi); her brother, Pericle Papahagi, was an acknowledged authority on the life and languages of the Romance-speaking peoples from south of the Danube, the Aromanians. She was also related to the Aromanian historian and philologist Nicolae Șerban Tanașoca, more precisely being the second cousin of his mother. Florica started high school at the Pompilian private boarding school (Pensionul Pompilian), but because of World War I, she had to continue high school in Moldavia, in the town of Roman, where the family had taken refuge.

She graduated from Roman Vodă High School (modern section) in 1920. She was admitted to the School of Medicine in Bucharest, from which she graduated in 1925. After years of internships and externships at the Bucharest hospital "Așezămintele Brâncovenești", she obtained a doctoral degree in medicine and surgery and the right to practice medicine. In 1927 she married Dr. Dumitru Bagdasar. The newly-weds Bagdasars went to Boston, Massachusetts to pursue professional training; Florica to attend Public Health courses at Harvard University, and Dumitru to acquire knowledge about the new neurosurgery techniques from the pioneer of modern brain surgery, Dr. Harvey Cushing, at his clinic, Peter Bent Brigham. While in Boston, Florica Bagdasar received a Rockefeller Scholarship.

Upon their return to their country in 1929, the couple spent a few years in Jimbolia and Cernăuți (Hospital for Nervous Diseases), after which they arrived in Bucharest, where they settled and where remained until the end of their lives. In 1935, Dumitru Bagdasar obtained, through a competition exam, the right to open the first neurosurgery clinic in Bucharest. All that time, from his return from Boston in 1929 until 1935, modern surgery technology did not exist in Romania and he was operating on the brain under primitive, improvised conditions. Until he was able to create his own neurosurgery team, it was his wife, Florica Bagdasar, who was the only one constantly at his side in the operating room, assisting and encouraging him.

== Professional activity ==
After passing through the whole sequence of necessary exams and competitions, Florica Bagdasar obtained the title of “Primary Psychiatrist”, with the specialty of mental hygiene. She dedicated herself to the field of neuropsychiatric and educational pediatric care. Bagdasar and her collaborator, Florica Nicolescu (Stafiescu), have successfully developed and experienced in numerous primary schools their own alphabet textbook ("The Book for All Children") and their own arithmetic manual, both based on the global grouping idea and simplified vertical writing. These teaching materials were meant to attract children's interest and make them learn with pleasure, in a rather play-like education process. In 1946 Bagdasar created the Center for Mental Hygiene in Bucharest, at 14, Vasile Lascăr Street, whose mission was to treat children with mental deficiencies and behavioral disorders. This center was designed by Florica Bagdasar following the most modern scientific methods used in the United States. As director of this institution, Florica Bagdasar recruited and organized an exemplary team of experts to deal with children's problems, psychologists, pedagogues, speech therapists, and kinesiotherapists. Florica Bagdasar served as director of the Center for Mental Hygiene until January 1953.

In 1946, after the death of her husband, who had been the Minister of Health in the Petru Groza government, Florica Bagdasar was asked to become the Minister of Health, as her husband's successor. She occupied this position from 1 December 1946 to 21 January 1951.

Dr. Florica Bagdasar became the first woman to lead a ministerial cabinet in Romania's government. In the years immediately following World War II, both Bagdasar ministers of health, her husband first, then she, faced serious crises that urgently needed to be resolved: sanitary networks decimated by the war, poverty, terrible famine – especially in the region of Moldavia where drought and fierce winter had ravaged — and which in turn contributed to the devastating epidemics of endemic typhus in Moldavia and malaria in Dobruja. Paul Cortez, the well-known Romanian psychiatrist, and epidemiologist Mihai Ciucă worked directly with the Minister of Health - Florica Bagdasar - in campaigns to combat these epidemics.

In 1949, Bagdasar was appointed associate professor at the Medical-Pharmaceutical Institute (IMF) in Bucharest, where she introduced the specialty of pediatric neuropsychiatry (Normal and Pathological Child Psychology). She became a promoter of infantile neuropsychiatry, both theoretical and practical, creating valuable specialists.

In October 1957 she was appointed vice-president of the Romanian Red Cross. She held this position for several years.

== Political activity ==
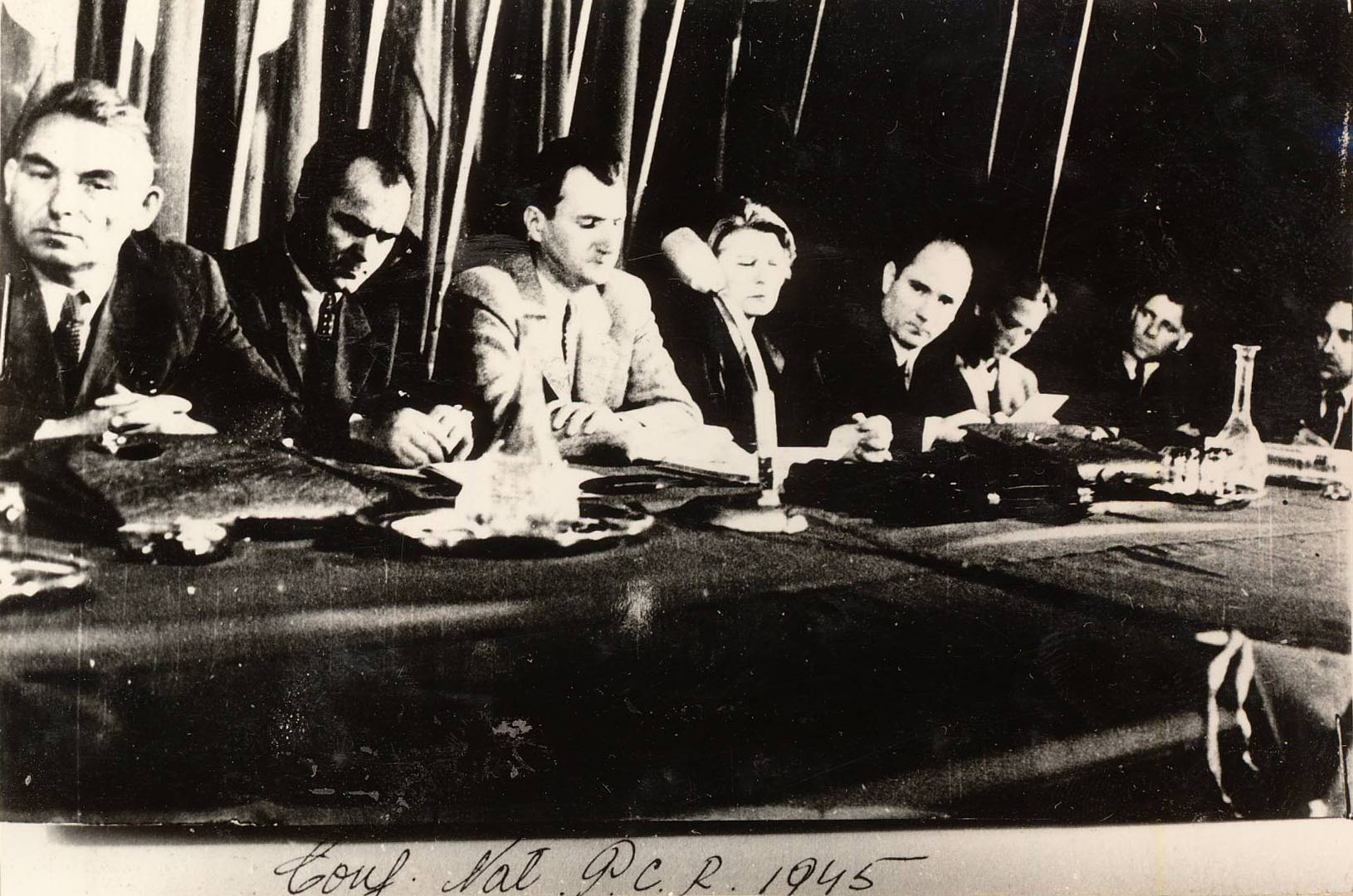
Vasile Luca, Constantin Pîrvulescu, Lucrețiu Pătrășcanu, Ana Pauker, Teohari Georgescu, Bagdasar, and Gheorghe Vasilichi at a Romanian Communist Party meeting in October 1945

Florica Bagdasar walked in the footsteps of her husband, Dumitru Bagdasar, who had a left political position since his youth. Thus, after coup d'état of August 23, 1944, Florica Bagdasar became a member of the Romanian Communist Party. From 1944 to 1948 she worked in various mass organizations, such as the Patriotic Defense, the Union of Patriots, and in the Union of Democratic Women in Romania (UFDR). Between 1946 and 1951, she was a member of the Great National Assembly as Tulcea County Deputy. In August–September 1946, she was the only woman in the official delegation of Romania to the Paris Peace Conference. From Paris, she went on an official mission to Stockholm to seek help from Sweden (food, and medicine) for war-torn Romania. After returning to her country on September 26, 1946, she was appointed Minister of Health on December 1, 1946, and held this position until January 21, 1951. In 1948 she was decorated with the Order of the Star of the Romanian People's Republic.

== Dismissal and rehabilitation ==
In 1949, she was appointed as associate professor at the Bucharest Medical and Pharmaceutical Institute, and in October 1957, the vice-president of the Red Cross organization in Romania, suggesting that Florica Bagdasar had a career of uninterrupted ascension. However, between 1953 and 1956 she fell in disgrace, only a step away from being executed.

The campaign against Bagdasar began in August 1948. She was on an inspection task in Dobruja during the antimalarial campaign when it was announced that she was released from office as Health Minister. The decision was made without any prior explanation. Years of contradictory rumors, intimidation, emergence of provocative agents, followed. In 1951, her closest collaborator at the Center for Mental Hygiene, Florica Nicolescu, was arrested, without a warrant of arrest; she was released after two years of imprisonment, without trial, without knowing what the allegations were. The campaign against Bagdasar culminated on January 18, 1953, with an article in the Scînteia newspaper entitled "To Clean Pedagogy of Anti-Science Deformations". Immediately after the article appeared, an official delegation descended at the Mental Hygiene Center and Bagdasar was removed from the position of director and forced to hand over the files and keys of the institute on the spot. All this in spite of the eloquent appreciation she received for the work of the center from Prof. Vlad Voiculescu. Bagdascar was subsequently hospitalized at Filaret, where she underwent lung surgery. Meanwhile, as the Party had decreed, the article about her in Scînteia was "discussed" in special long sessions at all schools and hospitals in the country. The complete article in Scînteia was accusing Bagdasar of "cosmopolitanism", of sluggish plunder in front of the rotten bourgeois ideology, of perversion of infantile psychiatry by introducing Freud-like obscurantist approaches, etc. She had been repeatedly investigated. She was left with no income, because her husband's pension from the academy was stopped, and the Housing Department (Spațiul Locativ) forced her to share with another family with two children the apartment where she lived with her daughter. Ostracization was complete: it was a period of fierce political disgrace, persecution, material shortages, illness. The irony of fate made that her serious illness most probably saved her from a more terrible fate, that of a "dimisal trail" based on the so-called deviations she was accused of.

At the end of 1956, Bagdasar began "rehabilitation" (along with the de-Stalinization program initiated by Nikita Khrushchev in the Soviet Union). She was asked to rejoin the party, which she refused. In October 1957 she was appointed vice-president of the Red Cross in Romania, a position in which she worked for several years. She was also given permission to travel abroad, and had the opportunity to visit her daughter in the United States several times. She continued to live in Romania until her death in 1978, being treated by the government in a "quasi-particular" way. As Valeriu Negru's stated: "she was tolerated politically, but not liked."

Florica Bagdasar’s death was described by American writer Saul Bellow in his novel The Dean's December. Saul Bellow accompanied his wife, Alexandra Bellow (formerly Alexandra Ionescu Tulcea), to Romania when her mother, Florica Bagdasar, was seriously ill and dying. Bagdasar is one of the main characters in that novel.

== In Memoriam ==
A memorial plaque was placed on the building of Speranței Street no. 13, Bucharest, Sector 2, reminding the passerby that there lived Dr. Dumitru Bagdasar and Dr. Florica Bagdasar.
