= Gheorghe Vlădescu-Răcoasa =

Romanian sociologist (1895–1989)

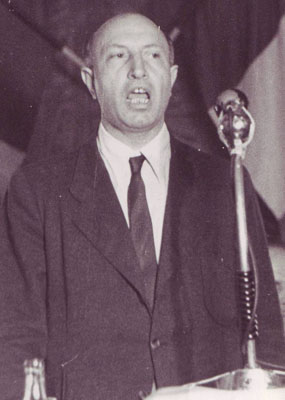
Gheorghe Vlădescu-Răcoasa

Gheorghe Vlădescu-Răcoasa (October 22, 1895 – December 17, 1989) was a Romanian sociologist, journalist, left-wing politician, and diplomat.

== Biography ==
=== Origins and work with Gusti ===
Born in Răcoasa, Vrancea County, his parents were Constantin (1862–1946), the village notary, and his wife Maria (née Lefter; 1865–1965), a schoolteacher. He attended primary school in his native village and in Focșani between 1902 and 1906. From 1906 to 1914, he studied at Bârlad's Gheorghe Roșca Codreanu High School. He then entered the law faculty of the University of Iași; from 1914 to 1915, he contributed to the weekly Cuvântul studențimii. He interrupted his studies in 1916, when Romania joined World War I and he was mobilized. An infantry lieutenant, he was taken prisoner by the Germans in 1917, interned at Breesen and released late in 1918. Upon his return to civilian life, he resumed his studies, this time at the literature and philosophy faculty of the University of Bucharest.

In September 1920, he became editing secretary for Curierul Artelor weekly, and would remain as such until the end of the following year. Later in 1920, he became Dimitrie Gusti's first teaching assistant in his sociology seminar, and continued helping with the course until 1929. In early 1921, Gusti's Social Institute took shape; within this organization, Vlădescu-Răcoasa would serve as administrative director and represent the organization on the international level. In May, he married Margareta Popescu; the couple's son Iustinian was born in 1922, and their daughter Mioara in 1923.

In 1922, he was editor-in-chief at Nicolae Iorga's Neamul românesc, and became editing secretary in autumn. In 1923, he obtained a university degree at Bucharest, became director of Gazeta Copiilor and was officially named Gusti's teaching assistant. In 1924, he founded a university organization in support of the League of Nations, serving as president until 1928. The same year, he became a frequent contributor to Societatea de mâine. In 1925, the Institute held a series of public speeches at the Carol I University Foundation; these were covered by Vlădescu-Răcoasa in Adevărul, where he was editor, and he would later write about similar events in Dimineața. That spring, Gusti initiated the first of his monographic research campaigns, in Dolj County's Goicea village; Vlădescu-Răcoasa was among the participants. The following year, he joined the team studying Rușețu, Brăila County. In 1926, he published Institutul Social Român. 1919–1926. From 1926 to 1928, he undertook studies at the University of Geneva and the Graduate Institute of International Studies, obtaining a doctorate in social sciences.

=== Clandestine activity and rise to prominence ===
In 1929, Vlădescu-Răcoasa became the International Labour Organization's representative in Romania, and remained in this position until 1940. In this capacity, he took part in numerous international conferences through 1937. Together with Gusti, he contributed to Bucharest's selection as the host city for the 14th International Sociological Congress, but this was cancelled due to the outbreak of World War II. In 1942, during the Ion Antonescu dictatorship, he founded the Patriotic Union, an anti-fascist organization led by communist and leftist intellectuals. He was arrested in March 1943 and the following February received a 15-year prison term for banned political activity. In August 1944, one day after the Antonescu regime was overthrown, he was freed from Văcărești Prison. By September–October, he was publicly allying with the Romanian Communist Party.

Following a cabinet reshuffle in November 1944, he was named Minorities Minister in the Constantin Sănătescu government, but quickly changed the department's name to the Minority Nationalities Ministry, considering the term "minority" to be pejorative. The cabinet resigned one month after Vlădescu-Răcoasa joined. A new cabinet was formed under Nicolae Rădescu, and the former retained his post. A national minorities statute was approved in February 1945; this document reportedly benefited Romania during the Paris Peace Conference. Later that month, a rally in Giurgiu attended by over 8,000 demanded a communist-led National Democratic Front (FND) government; Vlădescu-Răcoasa was the most prominent speaker. On March 6, when Petru Groza became the leader of such a government, Vlădescu-Răcoasa was assigned as state secretary for nationalities, remaining as such until his resignation in November 1946. In August, King Michael I named him a grand officer in the Order of the Star of Romania.

In early 1946, what was by then the Union of Patriots became the National Popular Party, with Vlădescu-Răcoasa as vice president. The party soon decided to take part in the upcoming election as part of the FND. In September, he replaced the deceased Mitiță Constantinescu as party president, and in the November election, won a seat as deputy for his home county. The following day, he was named full professor of economic sociology and social policy at the Bucharest Academy of Economic Studies (ASE).

=== Diplomatic posting and later years ===
In November 1947, Vlădescu-Răcoasa was named ambassador to the Soviet Union, and was also accredited to Finland. He arrived in Moscow in December, and in February 1948, was present for the signing of a friendship treaty between the Soviet Union and what was now the Romanian People's Republic. In April, while on a visit to Bucharest, he was named to the Great National Assembly committee preparing the 1948 Constitution of Romania, delivering a noted speech in favor of the initiative to the full assembly. In May, he was awarded the Order of the Star of the Romanian People's Republic, second class. In February 1949, while Vlădescu-Răcoasa was in Moscow, his party voted to dissolve itself. In August, he left Moscow, and his appointment formally ended in October. The termination of his ambassadorial mission was linked to the gradual decline in Foreign Minister Ana Pauker's influence.

By 1951, Vlădescu-Răcoasa was rector of ASE, professor in its faculty of cooperation, and principal researcher at the Romanian Academy's juridical section. In December 1952, he was named director of the Central University Library of Bucharest, serving until September 1956. From 1957 to 1963, he worked as scientific director at the Academy's library. His complete marginalization from politics during the 1950s coincided with a ban on sociological teaching. Although this was partly relaxed in the 1960s, Vlădescu-Răcoasa had already reached retirement age, and spent the rest of his years in seclusion. His wife died in September 1975, following a long illness. Vlădescu-Răcoasa died at his Bucharest home in December 1989, aged 94. Four days later, he was incinerated at Cenușa crematorium; his ashes were buried in Răcoasa. His son, who worked as an architect, died in 2002. His daughter died in Geneva in 2010.
