= Mitiță Constantinescu =

Romanian economist and politician

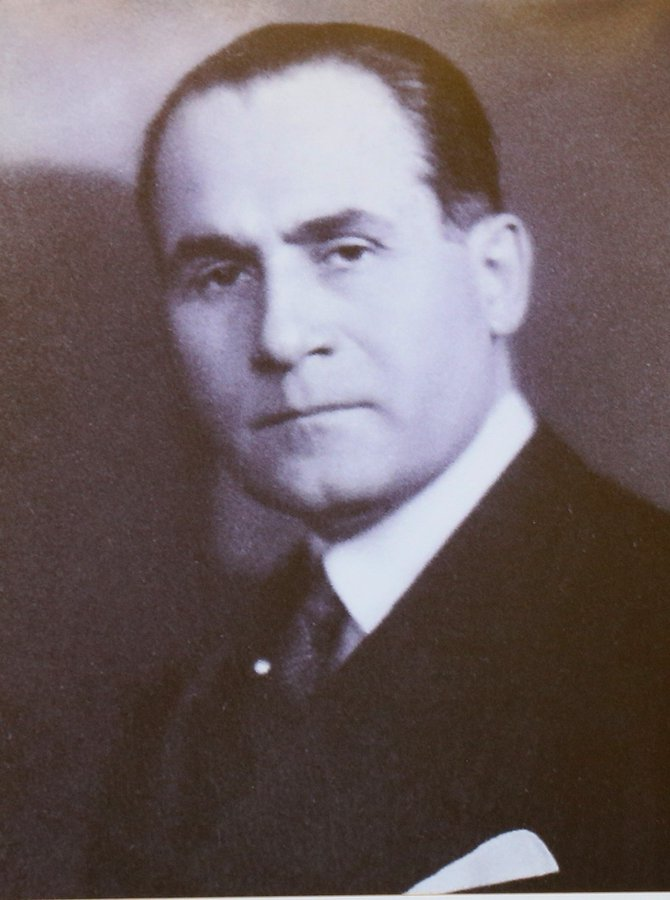

Mitiţă Constantinescu (October 20, 1890—1946) was a Romanian economist and liberal politician. He was an advocate of industrialization and a degree of dirigisme.

== Biography ==
Born in Bucharest, he graduated from the Gheorghe Lazăr High School and from the University of Bucharest's Faculty of Law. Applying for a doctorate in Paris, Constantinescu was forced to postpone it after Romania entered World War I, being drafted into the Romanian Army.

In 1918, he was awarded his first high-ranking administrative position, as chief of staff in the Ministry of Industry and Commerce in the National Liberal Party (PNL) cabinet of Ion I. C. Brătianu; Constantinescu held the office of General Secretary in of the Ministry of Agriculture and Royal Domains in a new Brătianu administration (1922–1926), was a PNL deputy for Hunedoara County in 1927-1933, and, between 1935 and 1940, Governor of the National Bank of Romania. In 1939, under the authoritarian regime established by King Carol II and his National Renaissance Front, he was Romania's Minister of Finance.

Retreating from public life during World War II, in protest against Ion Antonescu's fascist dictatorship (see Romania during World War II), Constantinescu was a member of Romania's Gheorghe Tătărescu-led delegation to the Paris Peace Conference (1946). During his later years, he became close to the Romanian Communist Party, created a minor political party named Liga Patrioţilor (League of Patriots) which described itself as "progressive" (and was ultimately led by the communist Petre Constantinescu-Iaşi), and authored a volume supportive of Stalinism and the Soviet Union (Continentul URSS, "The USSR Continent").

A hall at the National Bank is named after him.
