= Petre Constantinescu-Iași =

Romanian communist politician and historian

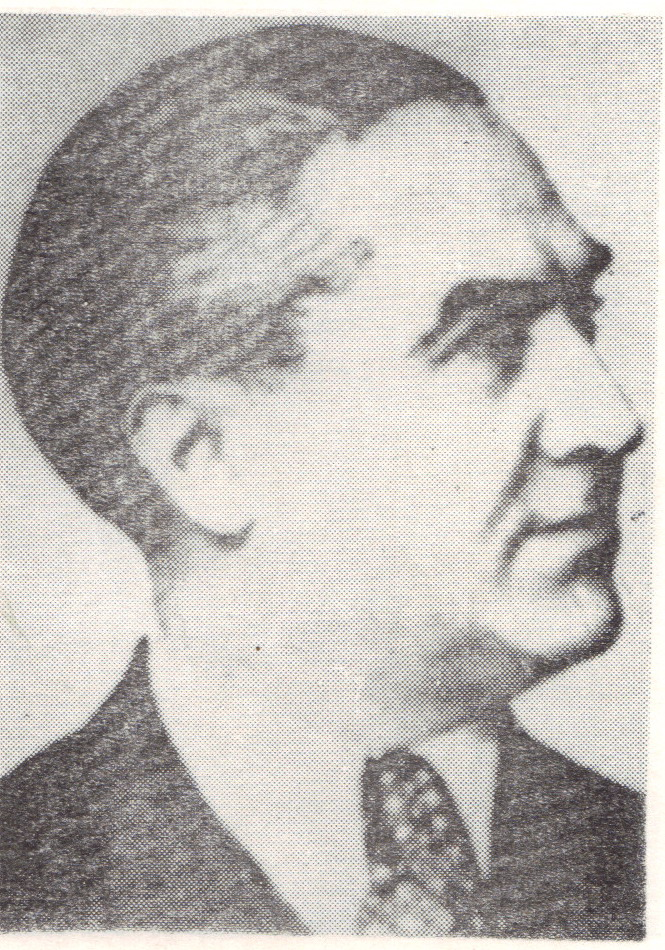

Minister of Information
- In office 6 March 1945 – 30 November 1946
- Prime Minister: Petru Groza

Minister of Cults
- In office 28 January 1952 – 19 March 1957
- Prime Minister: Gheorghe Gheorghiu-Dej

Personal details
- Born: 25 November 1892 Iași, Kingdom of Romania
- Died: 1 December 1977 (aged 85) Bucharest, Romania
- Party: Romanian Communist Party
- Other political affiliations: Social Democratic Party of Romania; National Popular Party
- Occupation: Historian

Petre Constantinescu-Iași (25 November 1892 – 1 December 1977) was a Romanian historian, academic and communist politician.

== Biography ==
=== Early life and education ===
Petre Constantinescu was born in the city of Iași, in a modest family of teachers. He completed his elementary studies in his hometown, where he also attended the National High School, from which he graduated in 1911. He then studied at the Faculty of Letters and Philosophy of the University of Iași.

Initiated in socialist ideas from high school, Constantinescu-Iași joined the Social Democratic Party, the local organization in Iași, in 1910. Between the years 1914–1916, he actively participated in the actions of PSD and trade unions in Romania. In 1921, he became a founding member of the Romanian Communist Party (PCR). During the interwar period he was part of the leadership of some legal mass organizations, created and led by the PCR.

After graduating from university, he worked as a secondary teacher at high schools in Iași, Huși, and Bârlad and as a professor at the University of Iași.

=== Interwar activism ===
Constantinescu-Iași took part in the establishment of the National Anti-Fascist Committee in 1933 and other legal organizations to fight against the growing fascist movement. Because of his anti-fascist activity, starting in 1936 he was arrested and tried several times, being imprisoned for several years in the prisons of Doftana, Miercurea Ciuc, and Târgu Jiu.

He was a founding member of the Friends of the USSR association. He also carried out an intense publicity activity in the service of the PCR policy, campaigning for the takeover of power by the communists. During the Antonescu regime, Constantinescu-Iași was involved in the achievement of the unity of the anti-fascist forces, actively participating in the preparation of the coup d'état of 23 August 1944.

=== Government official ===
After the takeover of power by the Romanian Communist Party, he held positions of great importance for the establishment and consolidation of the communist regime in Romania. First, he was Minister of Propaganda (from 5 March 1946, Minister of Information) in the Government of first government of Petru Groza from 6 March 1945 to 30 November 1946.

In 1948 he was elected as vice-president of the first Presidium of the Great National Assembly. As a deputy, he was president of the Romanian Group of the Interparliamentary Union; member of the World Interparliamentary Council; member of the National Antifascist Committee and vice-president of the same committee in Romania.

In 1948 he was also elected a member of the Romanian Academy. He was also elected a member of the Academy of Social and Political Sciences of the RSR, as well as a corresponding member of the Bulgarian Academy of Sciences.

Between January 28, 1953, and March 19, 1957, Constantinescu-Iași held the position of Minister of Religions in the governments of Gheorghe Gheorghiu-Dej and Chivu Stoica.

For his political and cultural activity, he was awarded the titles of "Hero of the Socialist Republic of Romania", "Hero of Socialist Labor" and other distinctions.

== Works ==
As a specialist in the modern and contemporary history of Romania, he made numerous contributions in the history of Romanian art and the Balkan peoples, in the study of the cultural and political relations of the Romanian people with neighboring peoples, as well as in the history of the labor movement and the history of the PCR, especially in the period 1933–1937. His studies ushered in research on the mass organizations led by the PCR, creating the basis for works on the history of the labor and socialist movements.

Petre Constantinescu-Iași is the author of over 100 scientific works published in the field of Romanian history, among which we mention the following:

- Rolul României în epoca de regenerare a Bulgariei (1919)
- Unde duce colaborarea. Pagini de istorie contemporană (1921)
- Istoria artei bizantine (1927)
- Evoluția stilului moldovenesc (1927)
- Istoria artei creștine din apus (1929)
- Tipărituri vechi românești necunoscute (1931)
- Românii și bulgarii (1945)
- Intelectualii și revoluția de la 1848 în Principatele Române (1948)
- Organizații de masă legale conduse de Partidul Comunist în anii 1932 - 1938 (1952)
- Relații culturale româno-ruse din trecut (1954)
- Studii istorice româno-bulgare (1956)
- Unirea țărilor române în artele plastice (1959)
- Lucrări și publicații din România despre Revoluția Socialistă din Octombrie (1967)
- Lupta pentru formarea Frontului Popular în România (1968)
- Pagini de luptă din trecut. 1914-1936 (1972)
- De la eliberare la socialism. 1944-1955 (1973)
- În anii socialismului victorios (1976)
